= Black–brown unity =

Ideology calling for unity among racialized people

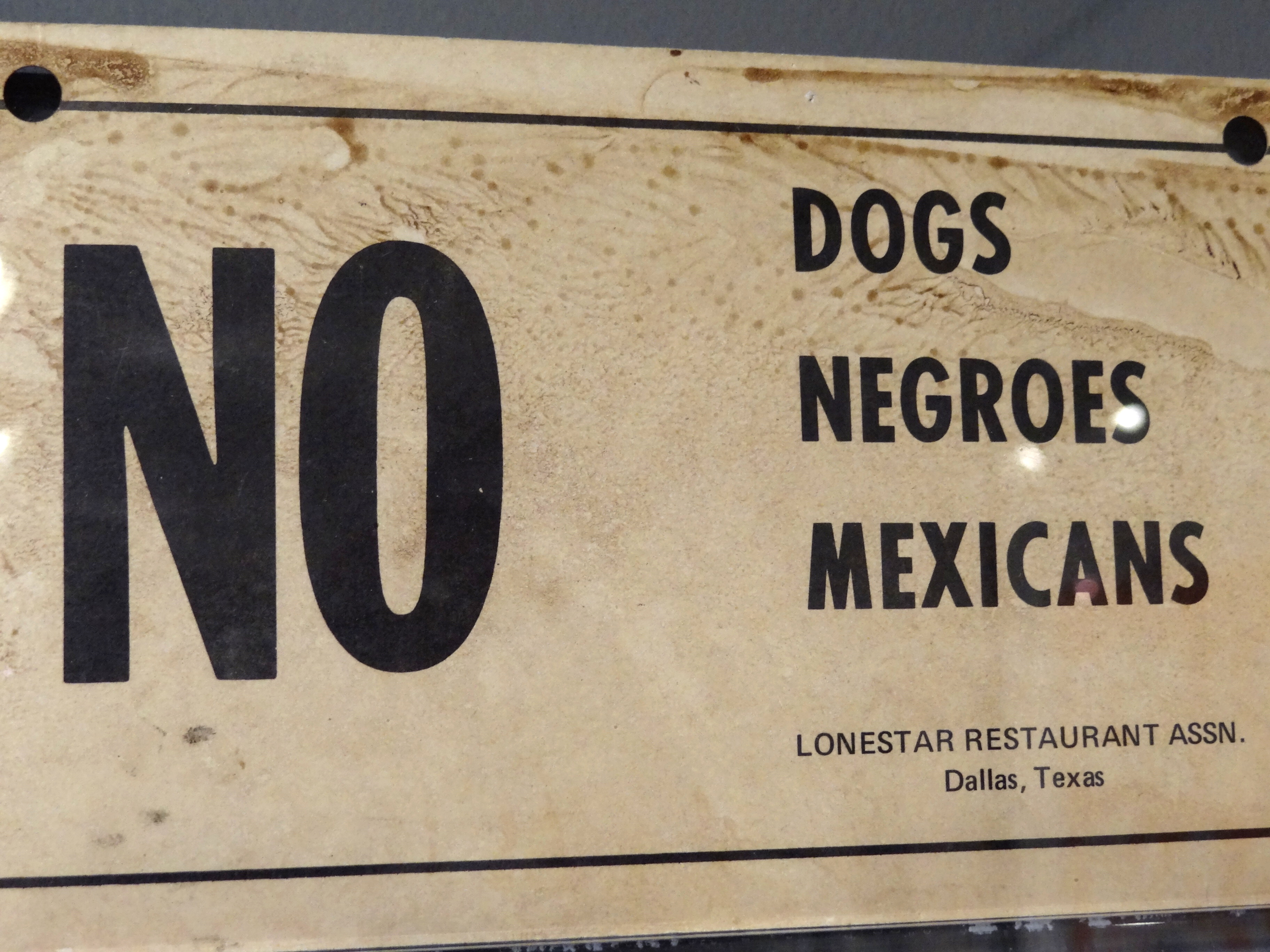
"No Dogs, Negroes, Mexicans" was a policy enforced by the Lonestar Restaurant Association throughout Texas. It not only excluded Black and Mexican patrons from white-owned businesses, but also equated them with a subhuman status. ca. 1940s. Similar signs could be found posted at Texas restaurants into the 1960s.

Black–brown unity, variations include black-brown-unity and black-brown-red unity, is a racial-political ideology which initially developed among black scholars, writers, and activists who pushed for global activist associations between black people and brown people (including Chicanos and Latinos), and Indigenous peoples of the Americas (historically referred to as "red") to unify against white supremacy, colonialism, capitalism, and, in some cases, European conceptualizations of masculinity, which were recognized as interrelated in maintaining white racial privilege and power over people of color globally.

The formation of unity struggles among people of color widely emerged in the 20th century and have been identified as an attempt to forge a united struggle by emphasizing the similar forms of oppression black and brown people confront under white supremacy, including shared experiences of subjugation under colonial capitalism, Jim Crow laws, de jure and de facto school and community segregation, voter disenfranchisement, economic oppression, exclusion from white-owned establishments, and the false perception by white people that black and brown people are biologically and racially predisposed to be inferior, criminal, disorderly, and degenerate.

According to scholars, unity becomes possible when the person of color who is oppressed in a white supremacist society first recognizes their status as a subject of racism and then moves to identifying with a community of other similarly oppressed peoples who are already working towards change. In some instances, such as in the case of forging an understanding of yellow power, scholars have noted that the need to create a pan-Asian identity and dismantle existing stereotypes (e.g. "model minority") are also necessary steps which precede the formation of cross-racial unity, as Asian-American activists, writers, and scholars such as Amy Uyematsu, Franklin Odo, Larry Kubota, Keith Osajima, and Daniel Okimoto have addressed since the late 1960s.

Black–brown unity became highly visible in 2020, fueled by activists, journalists, and people who increasingly recognized the shared struggles of black and brown people in the United States amidst the COVID-19 pandemic. Adam Serwer for The Atlantic stated that "the lives of disproportionately black and brown workers are being sacrificed to fuel the engine of a faltering economy, by a president who disdains them." A study found that black people and Latinos were three times as likely to know someone who had died of COVID-19. The George Floyd protests have increased recognition of police brutality affecting black and brown communities and open calls for unity among black and brown people. After being hit by rubber bullets at a Los Angeles protest, actor Kendrick Sampson stated that the police were "only here to terrorize black and brown communities and indigenous folk," who are the most vulnerable. Sampson previously supported Black-Brown-Indigenous unity in 2019. The Brown Berets, a Chicano/a organization, and Black Lives Matter organized a protest in San Antonio. Protests in Milwaukee were described as unifying black and brown communities within the city. In the aftermath of a conflict, activists in Little Village, Chicago, held a rally for black and brown unity to fight white supremacy.

== Ideology ==
The racial-political ideology of Black-Brown unity is based on acknowledging the similarities of oppression endured by Black and Brown people. Scholars examining this racial-political ideology demonstrate how the social and economic oppression of Black and Brown people is not isolated from one another, but rather shares many similarities, which may serve "as a major potential resource for greater Black-Brown unity," as described by scholars Tatcho Mindiola Jr., Yolanda Flores Niemann, and Nestor Rodriguez. The range of scholarship regarding Black-Brown(-Yellow-Red) unity is broad, yet works toward emphasizing the common goal of unity in the face of oppression.

Zillah Eisenstein and other scholars recognize how the need for unity among people of color emerged from the global nature of oppression and its relationship with capitalism, colonialism, masculinity, and white supremacy. As a result of this force, unity among people of color therefore operates as a means of resistance against this structure.

The language of otherness and difference became naturalized as the empire's continents become dark, and races become savage. There is a colonialist history to this becoming. Capitalism is the story of colonial conquest, of the Americas, then of Asia and Africa. And this conquest is part and parcel of an imperial masculinity which fantasizes the protection of white femininity. Dominance and domination are white and male. Colonialism simply presents itself as civilization and attempts to naturalize theft, rape, and dehumanization.

Similarly, Gary Okihiro recognizes how European colonialism was built on an ideology which justified "their expansion and appropriation of land, labor, and resources in Africa, Asia, and the Americas." This ideology of white superiority was justified "in the name of religion and science" which was wielded by the Europeans to assert their own purported superiority and "civilized" status in comparison to the "anti-Christian, uncivilized non-Europeans." According to Okihiro, when enacted through colonialism, this ideology led to a plundering of the world by Europeans and the global slave trade, which dehumanized enslaved peoples as units of production – a system of European development constructed on the underdevelopment of the Third World.

== First wave: 1960s-70s ==
The first wave of movements asserting the objective of forming unity or coalitions between people of color and economically disadvantaged whites, began in the late 1960s in the United States and declined by the 1970s. Chicano activists such as Cesar Chavez in 1965-1966 and Reies López Tijerina in 1967-1969 collaborated with civil rights and Black Power organizations to forge Black-Brown collaborative activist work. Organizations such as the Poor People's Campaign, organized by Martin Luther King Jr. in 1968 and Fred Hampton's Rainbow Coalition in 1969 attempted to construct multiracial coalitions based on the common interest of dismantling the structures which created poverty. However, as a result of police brutality, government surveillance and harassment, sabotage campaigns by government agencies and local police departments which targeted activist organizations with the intention of producing distrust and disunity among activists and organizations, and the assassination of leaders such as King and Hampton, this wave of multiracial coalition building declined by the 1970s.

=== Black-Brown unity ===
An unprecedented meeting of African American and Mexican American activists occurred in Albuquerque, New Mexico, at the Alianza Federal de Pueblos Libres 1967 conference hosted by Reies Tijerina to explore Black and Brown unity, cooperation, and forge a cross-racial alliance. Representatives from nearly every major Black Power organization were present, including Anthony Akku Babu of the Black Panther Party, Ron Karenga of the Us organization, James Dennis of the Congress of Racial Equality, Ralph Featherstone of the Student Nonviolent Coordinating Committee, and Walter Bremond of the Black Congress. Representatives of Chicano groups were also present, including José Angel Gutiérrez of the Mexican American Youth Organization, Bert Corona of the Mexican American Political Association, Dávid Sanchez of the Brown Berets, and Rodolfo "Corky" Gonzales of the Crusade for Justice. Activist Maria Varela was also invited to the conference and to join the Alianza by Tijerina.

The meeting ultimately produced the Treaty of Peace, Harmony, and Mutual Assistance, a seven-part pact which acknowledged mutual respect and cooperative alliance. Along with the other representatives, Hopi spiritual leader Thomas Banyacya, who was present at the conference along with many northern New Mexican villagers, also signed the treaty, which began with the following five articles:

Article I: "Both peoples do promise not to permit the members of either of said peoples to make false propaganda of any kind whatsoever against each other, either by SPEECH or WRITING."

Article II: "Both peoples (races) do promise, never to permit violence or hate, to break this SOLEMN TREATY between said peoples."

Article III: Both peoples, make a SOLEMN promise, to cure and remedy the historical errors and differences that exist between said peoples.

Article IV: Let it be known, that there will be a RECIPROCAL right to send an EMISSARY or DELEGATE to the conventions, Congresses, and National reunions of each of said peoples.

Article V: Let it be known that both peoples will have a political delegate to represent his interests and relations with the other.

The treaty concluded with the following statement: "this TREATY, will be valid between the two said peoples, as long as the Sun and Moon shall shine." While this agreement recognized that disagreements and conflicts between Black and Brown people had been present in a society which actively oppressed both groups, it signified an attempt to forge a coalitive liberation movement, and has been noted by scholars in comparative civil rights scholarship to represent the inception of an attempt to forge Black-Brown unity.

Attempts at coalition work between Black and Brown people largely occurred in the southwestern United States and had notable regional differences. In California, Black and Brown unity was exemplified through groups such as the Student Nonviolent Coordinating Committee and the National Farm Workers Association to combat racial segregation and fight for economic rights for farm workers. In Arizona and New Mexico, many Black Americans united with Mexican American groups in order to strengthen their civil rights struggle. In Texas, both Black and Brown Americans had their own widespread civil rights movements and unification was often not accentuated. Scholar Brian D. Behnken noted that "when African American and Mexican American activists moderated the divisive power of race by focusing on economics, they recognized the shared oppression of each group" and collectively fought for improved wages, hours, and working conditions.

Influenced by the Black Power movement, some Chicanos accentuated the similarities between Black and Brown political struggles. In 1968, the La Raza newspaper claimed the following on the relationship and shared struggle of Black Americans and Chicano communities: "Our oppressions are one. Our dreams are one. Our demands are one. We suffer as one, we react as one, we struggle as one!" This new position was a considerable shift from previous generations of Mexican Americans, especially among community leaders, many of whom were openly assimilationist and sought to assert Mexican identity as white. One East Los Angeles study found that twice as many Mexican Americans favored cooperation with Black Americans in 1972 than in 1965, and concluded that "when one takes into account traditional animosities marring Black-Mexican American relations," this was an "impressive finding." However, while animosity from Mexican Americans notably lessened as a result of new expressions of solidarity among Chicanos, the total number of Mexican Americans who favored cooperation was still in the minority at 39%.

In Los Angeles, school segregation became a focal point of Black-Brown unity throughout the 1960s and 1970s. In the mid-1960s, 80% of Black students attended schools which were predominately Black. Similarly, 50% of Mexican students attended schools which were predominately Mexican. These schools were often overcrowded and poorly funded whereas white schools were newly built and not filled to capacity. The Chicano Blowouts of 1968, in which tens of thousands of students protested unequal conditions in Los Angeles schools, were accompanied by walkouts of thousands of Black students in South Los Angeles, who also participated. As noted by academic Daniel Martinez HoSang, Black and Mexican American parents and students were often "plaintiffs in litigation related to educational adequacy and reform" in court cases into the early 1970s.

In 1983, Black-Brown unity in Chicago led to the election of mayor Harold Washington. After Washington's death in 1987, "when the black base split over which alderman should succeed Washington, Latino supporters were set adrift, and the remnants of the city’s infamous Democratic Machine exploited that uncertainty," as written by journalist Salim Muwakkil for In These Times. Richard M. Daley defeated Washington's successor by "pitting the gains of one group against the other—replacing black officials with Latinos, for instance—in order to forestall the unity."

=== Black-Yellow unity ===
Scholars have emphasized how Black-Yellow unity may be found in the shared experience of being subjected to slavery and servitude by European capitalism. Okihiro documents the "coolie" slave trade, in which approximately one-third of Asian enslaved peoples perished en route to the Americas under the forced authority of European and American ship captains, to assert that "the African and Asian coolie were kinsmen and kinswomen in that world created by European masters. For example, over 124,000 Chinese "coolies" were shipped to Cuba to service Cuba's plantation system. Historian Franklin W. Knight writes that the Chinese became "coinheritors with the Negroes of the lowliness of caste, the abuse, the ruthless exploitation.... Chinese labor in Cuba in the nineteenth century was slavery in every social aspect except the name." African and Asian forced laborers "were related insofar as they were both essential for the maintenance of white supremacy, they were both members of an oppressed class of 'colored laborers, and they both were tied historically to the global network of labor migration as slaves and coolies." African American community and political leaders, such as Frederick Douglass and Blanche K. Bruce, recognized this shared oppression openly.

Racism against African and Asian Americans was expressed via American law and proposed legislation. In California case The People v. George W. Hall (1854), Justice Charles J. Murray reversed the conviction of Hall, who had been convicted of murder based on the testimony of Chinese witnesses, based on legal precedents which had determined that "no black or mulatto person, or Indian, shall be allowed to give evidence in favor of, or against a white man" applied to Asian persons, since, in the American legal perception, "black meant nonwhite and white excluded all persons of color." The court upheld this decision on the grounds that white men should be shielded from the testimony "of the degraded and demoralized caste" of racially inferior peoples. In 1860, California legally banned African, Asian, and Amerindian children from attending schools designated for whites. In 1880, California enacted an anti-miscegenation law which prohibited marriages between white and nonwhite persons, whether "negro, mulatto, or Mongolian." In 1927, challenged by Gong Lum regarding segregation in Jim Crow schools, the United States Supreme Court upheld segregation and concluded that Chinese were "colored."

The American capitalist system was instituted along racial lines with the intention of creating divisions and preventing racial solidarity through pitting "African against Asian workers, whereby Asian workers were used to discipline African workers and to depress their wages." Ethnocentrism and prejudice between African and Asian American workers often directly developed from "ideas and practices of the master class." However, as Okihiro notes, while some African Americans were opposed to acts of cooperation and solidarity with Asian workers, the majority recognized that "the enemy was white supremacy and that anti-Asianism was anti-Africanism in another guise." In 1925, following the establishment of A. Phillip Randolph's Brotherhood of Sleeping Car Porters, the Pullman Company hired Filipinos, which the Brotherhood initially referred to as "scab laborers." However, by the 1930s, unlike the American Federation of Labor which excluded both Africans and Asians, the Brotherhood recognized the common struggle between Asian and African workers:

We wish it understood, that the Brotherhood has nothing against Filipinos. They have been used against the unionization of Pullman porters just as Negroes have been used against the unionization of white workers... We will take in Filipinos as members... We want our Filipino brothers to understand that it is necessary for them to join the Brotherhood in order to help secure conditions and wages which they too will benefit from.

== Challenges ==
=== Anti-Blackness ===
Anti-Blackness is a global obstacle to forming Black-Brown and multiracial unity. Scholars have identified U.S. media as a major exporter of anti-Blackness throughout the world, by shaping views through "racist stereotyping around the world, including negative images of Black Americans." Hsiao-Chuan Hsia conducted a study of fifteen rural Taiwanese who had never been to the United States, yet perceived Black Americans as "self-destructive, dirty, lazy, unintelligent, criminal, violent, and ugly." The researcher found that "these negative images were generally gleaned from U.S. television shows, movies, and music videos that the respondents had seen in Taiwan." Similarly, researcher Nestor Rodriguez found that U.S. media was disseminating anti-Black perspectives in Central America. In a study comparing foreign-born and U.S.-born Latinas in Houston, it was determined that foreign-born Latinas held "even more negative attitudes toward Black Americans" than U.S.-born Latinas, which has been identified as suggesting that "the foreign-born bring negative views of Black Americans from their countries of origin."

U.S. media reinforces anti-Black communities within racialized communities by providing biased and selective coverage of Black Americans. The Kerner Commission, which was assembled to address the causes of the 1967 Detroit race riots, found that American media was a major agent of the violence "through coverage and editorial writing that sometimes was blatantly hostile and antiblack," as summarized by academic Amy Alexander. The eleven-member commission wrote: "The media report and write from the standpoint of a white man's world. The ills of the ghetto, the difficulties of life there, the Negro's burning sense of grievance, are seldom conveyed." Television news media in particular has been found through scientific surveys to increase "the extent of anti-Black racism in public." The images of Black people the news media portrays have been found to perpetuate anti-Black stereotypes. The study, which controlled for education and other demographic traits, found that "heavy television viewers were more likely than light viewers to stereotype" Black people as being "unskilled and lazy."

In regard to non-Black Latino Americans and Chicanos, although they share a history of "colonial violence, slavery, genocide and exploitation of natural resources" with Black people, many harbor anti-Black sentiments which have existed since colonialism. Throughout Latin American countries, such as Brazil, the idea of racial whitening was made pervasive through colonialism, while mestizaje promoted a color-blind ideology. Because anti-Blackness is upheld by colonial states, such as the United States, many Latinos "buy-in to U.S.-based white dominant racial frames" while many Latino immigrants "bring anti-Black notions from their home countries or adopt anti-Black perspectives" as they learn from the dominant white supremacist culture to disparage and separate themselves Black Americans. American mass media has been identified as a major exporter of anti-Blackness to Latin America. Peter Ogom Nwosu identifies that racial slurs against Black people are common in Latino communities and that "racial skirmishes" in U.S. public schools between Black and Latino youth reflect a distrust among these communities. Nwosu argues that "Black and Latino historical struggles for freedom and justice are so intertwined that separation and divorce cannot be the most genuine pathway for progress in America," and that anti-Blackness must be combated through mutual respect.

In the aftermath of the murder of George Floyd, many discussed the need to deconstruct anti-Blackness in Asian American communities. Hmong American police officer Tou Thao became a central figure representing Asian American anti-Blackness, which "has sparked a conversation among Asian Americans" on the need to combat anti-Blackness in their communities. Previous cases such as Peter Liang in the shooting of Akai Gurley and anti-Black violence among Asian Americans during the Rodney King riots in the murder of Latasha Harlins were identified as exemplifying a tradition of anti-Blackness. Cultural critic Rachel Ramirez remarks that deconstructing anti-Blackness in Asian American communities is "a continuous process that requires breaking cultural barriers." Scholar Ellen Wu noted that, even though events such as the Chinese Exclusion Act and anti-Japanese sentiments were pervasive, that "in the 1960s, white liberals wielded the model minority stereotype to stifle black social movements." As a result, these gains fueled complicity in white supremacy among Asian Americans, as stated by Wu: "These gains, however, have come at a cost: complicity with white supremacy." The killing of 19-year-old Fong Lee in 2006 and the beating of 57-year-old Sureshbhai Patel in 2015, have been cited as cases of police brutality against Asian Americans that should also be recognized, not to overshadow police brutality against Black Americans, but to form solidarity. Youa Vang, mother of Fong Lee, stated that this was a moment "to stand in solidarity with the black community to fight for justice for Floyd — and to encourage Asian Americans, who have been divided in support of movements like Black Lives Matter, to do the same."

During the George Floyd protests in Little Village, Chicago and Cicero, Illinois, there were reports that Latino men of the Latin Kings gang, founded in Chicago, had harassed and attacked Black people driving through the neighborhood, throwing bricks at their cars. They claimed that they were protecting businesses. A 49-year-old Black man was shot in the wrist during the attacks by a youth gang member. Some residents claimed the police had allowed the gang to roam, while the police denied this accusation. In response, eight Latino aldermen, released a joint statement denouncing “white supremacy, racism, economic exploitation, and anti-Blackness in all its forms.” A solidarity march at Cicero Town Hall was held shortly after, denouncing the conflict. On June 2, "a coalition of Latino organizers formed the Brown Squad For Black Lives and a Black and Brown Unity food pantry was planned." The following day, a rally under the 26th street arches in Little Village was held. Stephanie Cerda-Ocampo stated that she had joined the rally to emphasize a “need to stick together and fight against the real issue like white supremacy.” Michelle Zacarias, one of the founders of the Brown Squad For Black Lives stated, "the ultimate goal is to make sure that our Black community members are protected at all costs. And also understanding that Black liberation means liberation for all people. Our struggles are intersected." The Washington Post reported that a truce between the Latin Kings and the local Black P Stones was declared and the conflict was settled. Chicago Sun-Times characterized the conflict as a result of misplaced blame: "All too often in Chicago, Latinos and African Americans fight for scraps. We have to accept slumlords as landlords. We don’t know where to turn when our wages are stolen."

=== Asian Americans and the "model minority" ===
In 1956, social scientists William Caudill and George De Vos initially hypothesized on the commonalities between Japanese culture and "the value systems found in American middle class culture" and positioned Asian Americans as reflecting similarities with white culture or existing as a "model minority." Gary Okihiro notes that, although Caudill and De Vos had attempted to "distinguish between identity and compatibility, similarity and sharing, subsequent variations on the theme depicted Asians as 'just like whites'." Okihiro notes that because of the manner in which race is conceptualized in the United States, as a binary between white and black, Asian, Amerindian, and Latinos are positioned as "somewhere along the divide between black and white." While Okihiro acknowledges that Asian Americans have "served the master class," whether as an oppressed class on a similar status to Black Americans or as a model minority class who presently may be perceived as "near whites," he ultimately concludes that "yellow is emphatically neither white nor black; but insofar as Asians and Africans share a subordinate position to the master class, yellow is a shade of black, and black, a shade of yellow."

In his 1973 essay entitled "Yellow Power," Larry Kubota echoes the sentiments of Frantz Fanon's notion regarding the psychic violence of colonialism and refers to the model minority stereotype as a myth which had conditioned some Asians in the United States to believe that "there was no need for change because their own social and economic status was assured." As scholar Rychetta Watkins notes of Kubota's perceptions on the notion of the Asian model minority, "this myth not only flattened the image of the community to a small group of successful second- and third- generation Chinese Americans and Japanese Americans, it also isolated Asian Americans from other ethnic minorities, hindering the coalitions which would be necessary for creating a revolutionary coalition in America." Amy Uyematsu similarly reflects that "Asian Americans are perpetuating white racism [...] as they allow white America to hold up the successful Oriental image before other minority groups as the model to emulate." Keith Osajima addresses Asians in America who use the model minority myth to uphold white supremacy: "fully committed to a system that subordinates them on the basis of non-whiteness, Asian Americans still tried to gain complete acceptance by denying their yellowness. They have become white in every respect but color."

=== Mexican Americans and whiteness ===
Prior to the establishment of the Chicano Movement and the consolidation of Chicano identity in the late 1960s and 1970s, most Mexican American community leaders were fixated on attempting to appeal to the white establishment by claiming a white identity. Lisa Y. Ramos notes that, prior to the 1960s, many "Mexican American leaders were wedded to whiteness, meaning they possessed a strong identification with the white race and especially the idea of white racial supremacy over other racial groups." In the 1930s, legal scholar Ian Haney López records that "community leaders promoted the term Mexican American to convey an assimilationist ideology stressing white identity." Ramos notes that "this phenomenon demonstrates why no Black-Brown civil rights effort emerged prior to the 1960s."

Chicano identity was critical in shifting these perceptions among Mexican Americans towards opening the possibility of Black-Brown unity, as "Chicanos defined themselves as proud members of a brown race, thereby rejecting not only the previous generation's assimilationist orientation but their racial pretensions as well." Even prior to the 1960s, members of the Mexican community who were of darker complexion, recent immigrants, and/or working-class often identified based on their cultural or familial ties in Mexico and not by their race. In the 1940s and 1950s, as a precursor to the Chicano Movement, Mexican youth rejected the previous generation's racial aspirations and developed an "alienated Pachuco culture that fashioned itself neither as Mexican nor American." As a result, some scholars designate a difference between Chicanos and Mexican Americans. According to López, "Mexican Americans refers to the Mexican community who insisted that Mexicans are white, and Chicanos refers to those who argued instead that Mexicans constitute a non-white race."
