= William H. Ferris =

American minister and writer (1874–1941)

William Henry Ferris (July 20, 1874 – August 23, 1941) was an American author, minister, and scholar.

== Early life ==
He was born in New Haven, Connecticut, the son of David H. and Sarah Ann Jefferson Ferris. His grandparents were free at the time of his father's birth. His father joined the Union Army voluntarily at the age of 17. His mother's father escaped from captivity on plantation and later purchased the freedom of his wife and children.

== Education and career ==
A graduate of Yale University (1895) with a BA degree, Ferris subsequently took on the role of writer and lecturer. He was a Harvard Divinity School student from 1897 to 1899, graduating from Harvard with an MA in journalism in 1900. After teaching at Tallahassee State College, Florida Baptist College (1900–01), he worked for a number of newspapers from 1902 to 1903. He continued teaching during the years 1903–1905 at Henderson Normal School and Kittrell College in North Carolina. Ferris became pastor of Christ Congregational Church from 1904 to 1905. In 1908 he wrote a book entitled Typical Negro Traits. From 1910 to 1912, he was given charge of the "colored" missions of the A.M.E. Zion Church of Lowell and Salem, Massachusetts, as a lecturer at white churches. He went on to write The African Abroad; or his Evolution in Western Civilization: Tracing his development under Caucasian Milieus in 1913.

Ferris held positions as Assistant President General of the UNIA-ACL and Associate Editor of the Negro World.

== Activism ==
He was a participant in the March 5, 1897, meeting to celebrate the memory of Frederick Douglass which founded the American Negro Academy led by Alexander Crummell. Over the coming decades, Ferris remained active among the scholars, editors, and activists of this first major African American learned society, refuting racist scholarship, promoting black claims to individual, social, and political equality, and studying the history and sociology of African American life. Ferris worked with William Monroe Trotter and the Boston Guardian, W. E. B. Du Bois and the Niagara Movement, and John Edward Bruce and the Negro Society for Historical Research.

At the suggestion of Trotter, Ferris came to Washington in January 1903 and spoke in opposition to the more conservative approach to black rights of Booker T. Washington in front of the Bethel Literary and Historical Society on January 6, 1903. As a reply, Richard W. Thompson spoke in front of the Second Baptist Lyceum on January 25 in support of Washington. In 1999, Jacqueline M. Moore argued that Thompson's paper failed to hold his ground against Ferris, who was present at the talk.

The Second Baptist Lyceum met again on February 3 to hear a paper by Jesse Lawson in favor of Washington. In support of Washington were Robert H. Terrell, Bishop Alexander Walters, Dr. William Bruce Evans, J. H. Ewing, and Thompson, and those against were Ferris, Armond W. Scott, Lafayette M. Hershaw, T. M. Dent, Shelby James Davidson, and Mrs. Ida D. Bailey. Terrell, Evans, Lawson, and Thompson all owed positions or favors to Washington's influence. John C. Dancy, George H. White, Mrs. Anna Evans Murray wife of Daniel Murray, Reuben S. Smith, Kelly Miller, Prof. Lewis Baxter Moore, and John P. Green were neutral. This controversy continued into the summer where important meetings in Louisville and Boston saw heated argument which even led to blows and Trotter's and Granville Martin's imprisonment.

In 1922, he was working on a volume entitled The African in Western Lands.

The African Times and Orient Review published an article by Ferris in which he praised an article previously contained in the same journal by Marcus Garvey.
