= Racial classification of Indian Americans =

Racial classification of Americans with ancestry from India

The racial classification of Indian Americans has varied over the years and across institutions. Originally, neither the courts nor the United States Census Bureau classified Indian Americans as a race because there were only negligible numbers of Indian immigrants in the United States. Early Indian Americans were often denied their civil rights, leading to close affiliations with African Americans. For most of America's early history, the government only recognized two racial classifications, white or colored. Due to immigration laws of the time, those deemed colored were often stripped of their American citizenship or denied the ability to become citizens. For these reasons, various South Asians in America took the government to court to try to be considered white instead of colored. After advocacy from the Indian American community, the racial category of Asian Indian was finally introduced in the 1980 U.S. census.

== Initial perceptions ==
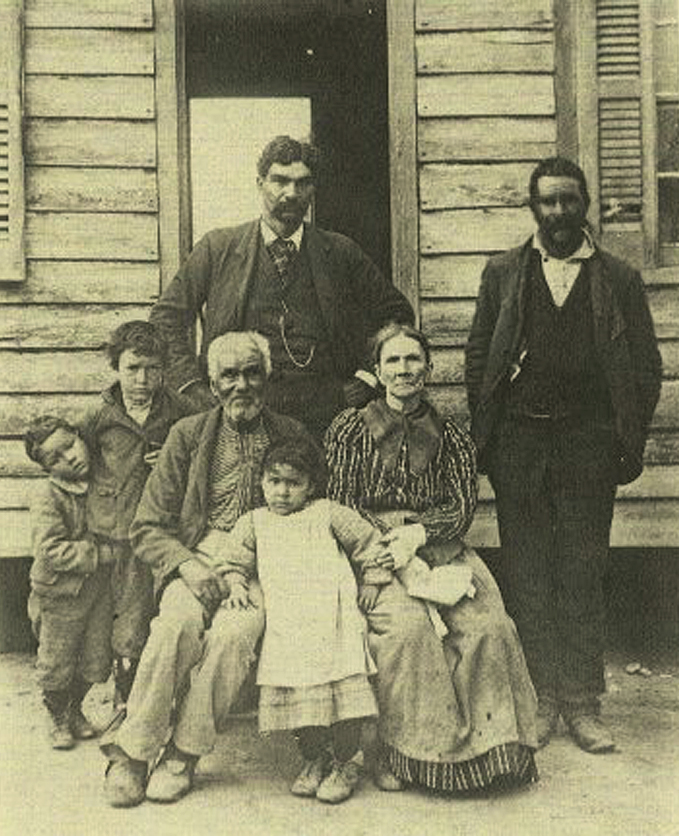
Members of the Nansemond tribe, descendant of Asian Indian, Native American, and African American people, c. 1900, Smithsonian Institution

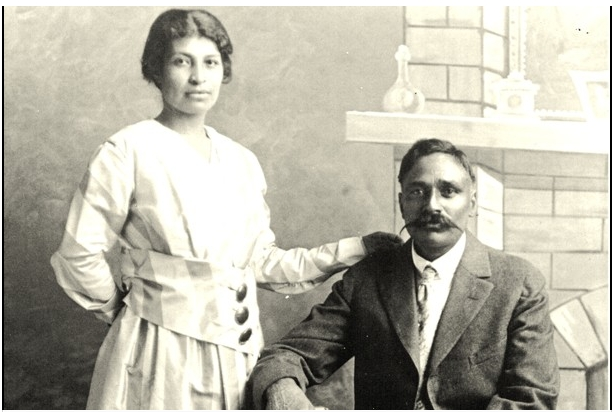
A Punjabi Mexican American couple, Valentina Alarez and Rullia Singh, posing for their wedding photo in 1917.

One of the first recorded Indians in America was a mixed-race girl born to an Indian father and an Irish American mother in 1680 in Maryland. Due to her Indian American father being classified as "Negro", she was classified as a mulatto and later sold into slavery. Court records from the 1700s indicate a number of "East Indians" were held as slaves in Maryland and Delaware. Upon freedom, they are said to have blended into the free African American population - considered mulattoes within the African American community. Three brothers from modern day "India or Pakistan" received their freedom in 1710 and married into a Native American tribe in Virginia. The present-day Nansemond people trace their lineage to this intermarriage.

The earliest Indian immigrants into the United States were called "Hindus" even though the majority of them were Sikhs. Court clerks classified these early immigrants from the Punjab region as being "black", "white", or "brown" based on their skin color for the purpose of marriage licenses. In addition to being racialized by their color, they were also racialized as being "foreigners".

The perception of Indian Americans as foreigners sometimes helped provide for better treatment, especially in states where de jure segregation was in place. As opposed to being seen as black, in some states Indians were seen as outside of the traditional American racial spectrum, and consequently freed from the encumbrances which that system entailed.

By the mid-1950s, those who remained settled in the then vibrant black neighborhoods of Tremé in New Orleans, Black Bottom in Detroit, West Baltimore, and Harlem in New York. Many started families with Creoles, Puerto Ricans, and African Americans. An example is Indian-born Hucheshwar Gurusidha Mudgal, who became a prominent journalist in Harlem's African American community. Punjabi Sikhs in California found a closer camaraderie with Mexicans, resulting in a unique mixed-race community in the Yuba City area - the Punjabi Mexican Americans.

== Identity ==
=== Self-identification ===
Indian independence movement fighter Kamaladevi Chattopadhyay wrote of the Indian racial identity in America as being "black". After spending years studying and living with African American families, Chattopadhyay wrote Indians in America should form ties with African Americans, believing they share a common ancestry and a common struggle for independence. Following the George Floyd protests of the 2020s, some segments of the American-born South Asian community have renewed calls for camaraderie with African Americans.

However, South Asians often try to distance themselves from African Americans and Hispanics. Even though South Asians "insist on being called 'brown', the plea of Indian immigrants not to be called black is what is most audible". This is due to considerable anti-blackness and anti-Hispanic prejudice in some segments of the South Asian population. This prejudice is often accompanied by a fear of being mistaken for black or Hispanic, described as "an almost paranoid response to even being thought of as black".

Some South Asian Americans have identified themselves as being "Brown Asians" or "Brown South Asians", while others, like Nikki Haley, a former governor of South Carolina and of Indian descent, identified as "white" on her voter registration card in 2001. Dick Harpootlian, chairman of the South Carolina Democrats, stated "Haley has been appearing on television interviews where she calls herself a minority—when it suits her... When she registers to vote she says she is white. She has developed a pattern of saying whatever is beneficial to her at the moment." While some Asian Americans (including South Asian descendants) may not identify with the "Asian American" label at all, due to the term's association with East Asian Americans. As such, the "Brown Asian" label sees some usage to further differentiate South and Southeast Asian Americans from those of East Asian descent.

The official classification of South Asian as part of the "Asian American" racial category represents an agreement of convenience for South Asians on where they fit on the black-white racial spectrum in the United States, as American society is largely dominated by only a "white" and "black" racial and skin color classification system. Depending on the social and legal context, some Indian Americans may identify as either "white" or "black". South Asian Americans and other types of Asian Americans mutually feel that there exists "profound racial difference" between themselves and the other Asian ethnic group. Furthermore, "Working-class or state school-educated second generation Indian Americans do not see a natural alliance or unity with other Asian American groups." Many South Asian Americans have noted that their perceived differences in cultural, religious, and racial/physical appearance with other Asian American ethnic groups has often lead them to being excluded in Asian American studies, narratives and media representations.

=== Identification by others ===
Early Indian travelers to America, including philosopher and author Swami Vivekananda, were identified as black by both African Americans and White Americans. The racial prejudice associated with this identification created strong anti-racist sentiments in authors such as Vivekananda, which in turn influenced the philosophies of W. E. B. Du Bois.

In 1989, the East–West Center published a research paper about Indian Americans that said that Americans find identifying South Asians by race and color to be difficult. The paper said that a 1978 survey of Americans asked the question, "Would you classify most people from India as being white, black, or something else?" The paper said that 38% of respondents classified most people from India as "other", 23% classified them as "brown", 15% classified them as "black", 13% did not know how to classify them, and 11% classified them as "white".

In 2000, a series of interviews of second-generation Asian American college student leaders found that most of the interviewees who did not include Indian Americans as Asian Americans did not express a clear reason that was more than perceived difference in physical appearance and culture.

Indian Americans have often been misidentified as being of Arabs or Middle Eastern origin, particularly after the September 11 attacks. Assaults against turban-wearing Sikhs have become common since 9/11, due to Sikh turbans resembling the turban that Osama Bin Laden often wore in pictures. After her win in 2013, Miss America winner Nina Davuluri was taunted online and called an "Arab" and a "terrorist" due to this misconception among the American public.

In 2015, Sureshbhai Patel was described by a suspicious caller as a "skinny black guy" before he was beaten and severely injured by Alabama police officers.

The 2017 book, Indians In America, stated that Indians and other South Asians are a part of Asian Americans, yet apart from Asian Americans. While they are admitted among Asian Americans, they are not acknowledged among Asian Americans. According to this book, other Asian Americans characterize Indians and other South Asians to be "ambiguously nonwhite."

Some have attributed the general exclusion of South Asian Americans from the Asian American label due to the term being synonymous with people of East Asian origin. In 2019, it was noted that there were several presidential candidates of Asian American or Pacific Islander origin, including Andrew Yang and Kamala Harris, who are of Taiwanese and Indian descent respectively. Frequently described by the media and campaigning himself as 'the' Asian American candidate, Yang stated that his "Asian-ness [is] kind of obvious in a way that might not be true of Kamala or even Tulsi... That's not a choice. It's just a fairly evident reality."

== U.S. courts ==
Throughout much of the early 20th century, it was necessary for immigrants to be considered white in order to receive U.S. citizenship. U.S. courts classified Indians as both white and non-white through a number of cases.

In 1909, Bhicaji Balsara became the first Indian to gain U.S. citizenship. As a Parsi, he was ruled to be "the purest of Aryan type" and "as distinct from Hindus as are the English who dwell in India". Thirty years later, the same Circuit Court to accept Balsara ruled that Rustom Dadabhoy Wadia, another Parsi from Bombay, was colored and therefore not eligible to receive U.S. citizenship.

=== Thind case and attempted revocations of citizenship ===
In 1923, the Supreme Court decided in United States v. Bhagat Singh Thind that while Indians were classified as Caucasians by anthropologists, people of Indian descent were not white by common American definition, and thus not eligible to citizenship. The court conceded that, while Thind was a high caste Hindu born in the northern Punjab region and classified by certain scientific authorities as of the Aryan race, he was not "white" since the word Aryan "has to do with linguistic and not necessarily with physical characteristics" and since "the average man knows perfectly well that there are unmistakable and profound differences" between Indians and White Americans. The court also clarified that the decision did not reflect or imply anything related to racial superiority or inferiority, but merely an observable difference.

At the time, this decision began the process of retroactively stripping Indians of citizenship and land rights. The ruling also placated the Asiatic Exclusion League demands, spurned by growing outrage at the Hindoo Invasion alongside the pre-existing outrage at the Yellow Peril. As they became classified as colored, Indian Americans were not only denied American citizenship, but also banned by anti-miscegenation laws from marrying White Americans in the states of Arizona, Virginia, South Carolina, and Georgia.

Following the Thind case, the Bureau of Naturalization began action to strip Thind and other Indian-Americans of their citizenship, arguing it had been "illegally procured". However, these efforts were forced to end by the government's loss in court in the case against Thind's own lawyer, a Californian named Sakharam Ganesh Pandit. By the time Pandit's case came to trial in 1926, forty-two of sixty-nine citizenships granted to Indians had been revoked. Pandit, a skilled lawyer, argued that under the doctrine of equitable estoppel, he would be irreversibly harmed by the revocation of his American citizenship, which he had reasonably relied upon - he would become stateless, lose his property and law license, and his wife would lose her citizenship as well.

Judge Paul McCormick, the initial trial judge, ruled in Pandit's favor, accepting his arguments wholeheartedly. In 1927, the Ninth Circuit upheld McCormick's ruling under the doctrine of res judicata. As a result of Pandit's case, the US government subsequently dropped its other denaturalization cases against Indian Americans.

In 1935, Thind relied on his status as a veteran of the United States military during World War I to petition for naturalization through the State of New York under the Nye-Lea Act, which made World War I veterans eligible for naturalization regardless of race. The government objected his latest petition, but Thind was finally granted American citizenship; yet the Government attempted to revoke it after nearly two decades from his first petition for naturalization.

=== After World War II ===
In 1946, Congress, beginning to recognize that India would soon be independent, passed a new law that allowed Indians to become citizens, while also establishing an immigration quota.

As David E. Bernstein explains in the book Classified, The Untold Story of Racial Classification in America, by the early 1970s most federal agencies identified Indian Americans as part of the white group, partly because they were deemed to be a "successful" immigrant group not in need of minority status. When the Office of Management and Budget announced proposed official racial classifications in 1976, Asian Indians were put into the white category. However, a small Indian American group based in New York City got wind of this, and successfully lobbied the government to put South Asians into the Asian American/Pacific Islander classification. Not all Indian Americans agreed with this change, but no other organized group found out about it until the classification was final and official.

In 1993, Dale Sandhu, an Asian Indian whose origin is from the Punjab, took his former employer, Lockheed, to court on grounds of wrongful dismissal due to racial grounds. Lockheed attempted to counter Sandhu's claims by stating he is Caucasian, so he cannot allege discrimination based on race. In 1993, the California Superior Court Judge overseeing the case initially accepted Lockheed's view. However, in 1994, the California Sixth District Court of Appeals reversed the 1993 decision for Dale Sandhu. Lockheed argued that the "common popular understanding that there are three major human races — Caucasoid, Mongoloid, and Negroid." The Court of Appeals denied this 19th century classification of race, stating that Indian people are a distinct ethnic group of their own. According to United States Census, "Asian Indian" is considered one of the distinct 15 races. The Court of Appeals affirmed that Sandhu was subject to discriminatory hostility, based on being a member of a distinct racial group. The Court of Appeals said that Sandhu could make a claim of racial discrimination under FEHA within the jurisdiction of the Court.

In 2015, in Dhar v. New York City Department of Transportation, Dhar, a former employee and a Christian Bangladeshi, alleged a violation of Title VII of the Civil Rights Act of 1964, based on his race, religion, and national origin. He alleged that his former supervisor, a Hindu Gujarati, illegally favored other Hindu Indian/Gujarati employees. The court dismissed the claim.

== U.S. census ==
=== Official classification ===
The U.S. Census Bureau has changed over the years its own classification of Indians. In the 1930 and 1940 censuses, "Hindu" was listed as a racial category. Following India's independence in 1947, the U.S. census categorized individuals with Indian heritage, including Sikhs, as belonging to the "Other Race" category in both the 1950 and 1960 censuses, designating them as either "Asiatic Indian" or "Hindu." In 1975, the Ad Hoc Committee on Racial and Ethnic Definitions of the Federal Interagency Committee on Education made a report. The report describes how, as it was deliberating on how to classify groups for the 1970 U.S. census, South Asians presented a problem for the Ad Hoc Committee. The report presented the classification problem as how to classify South Asians, as there had been little discussion surrounding their unique ethnic identity. While some anthropologists classified them as Caucasian, they were non-white, from Asia and could be subject to some discrimination in the United States. Unsure of their status, the Ad Hoc Committee failed to designate South Asians as a minority category, and any respondents were classified as White Americans in the 1970 U.S. census.

Upon learning of the Ad Hoc Committee's decision, the Association of Indians in America (AIA) mobilized to seek better representation. Indian American groups, through their own petitioning, successfully changed their racial classification to Asian in the 1970s to have themselves included in the state and federal Asian racial category. Specifically, starting in the mid-1970s, the AIA made the argument that since Indian Americans were minorities and thus entitled to the benefits of affirmative action, Indian Americans should have "minority" group status. Without their request to be designated as minorities, Indian Americans may not have been recognized as a unique ethnic group by the U.S. government.

In 1977, the Office of Management and Budget accepted the AIA's petition to have the "Asian Indian" category included in the census Due to the efforts of the AIA leaders, a new census category, "Asian Indian," was introduced for the 1980 U.S. census. In 1977, there were so few Indian Americans that the misplaced grouping of Asian Indians with European-descent Americans attracted little attention.

In 1989, the East–West Center published a research paper about Indian Americans that said that the term, "Asian Indian", one of the fourteen "races" in the 1980 U.S. census, is an "artificial census category and not a meaningful racial, ethnic, or ancestral designation" due the vast diversity of cultures, genotypes, and phenotypes found within India.

=== Self-identification ===
In the U.S. census, Indians display the highest likelihood of selecting the "African American or black" category, while Sri Lankans followed by Pakistanis are most likely to describe themselves as "white". The 1990 U.S. census classified write-in responses of "Aryan" as white even though write-in responses of "Indo-Aryan" were counted as Asian, and it also classified write-in responses of "Parsi" under Iranian American, who are classified as "White" along with Arab Americans and other Middle Eastern Americans. The Asian American Institute proposed that the 2000 U.S. census make a new Middle Easterner racial category and the Punjabi from Pakistan wanted Pakistani Americans to be included in it.

Some Indian Americans who were unfamiliar with the ethnonymic conventions used in the United States, mistakenly indicated that they were "American Indian" as their race in the 1990 U.S. census, understandably unaware that this term is used in the United States to refer to Native Americans (Amerindians).

== See also ==
- Asian immigration to the United States
- Becoming white thesis
- Political blackness
- Indian Americans
- A. K. Mozumdar
- Judicial aspects of race in the United States
