= Harlem History Club =

Study group based in Harlem, New York City

Harlem History Club was a study circle founded in Harlem in the 1930s and based at the Harlem YMCA.

Participants included:

- John Henrik Clarke
- Willis Nathaniel Huggins
- John G. Jackson
- Joel A. Rogers
- Charles Seifort
- Richard B. Moore
- William Leo Hansberry
- Nnamdi Azikiwe
- Kwame Nkrumah
