= Milai =

Milai is a given name and surname. Notable people with the name include:

- Milai Perott (born 2004), Bermudian footballer
- Sam Milai (1908–1970), American editorial and comic strip cartoonist
