= John G. Jackson (writer) =

American teacher, historian and author (1907–1993)

- Born: John Glover Jackson; April 1, 1907; Aiken, South Carolina, U.S.
- Died: October 13, 1993 (aged 86)
- Occupations: Pan-Africanist, historian, lecturer, teacher, writer, atheism activist

John Glover Jackson (April 1, 1907 – October 13, 1993) was an American historian, lecturer, teacher and writer. He promoted ideas of Afrocentrism, atheism, and Jesus Christ in comparative mythology. He held fringe views on Jesus and Christian origins.

== Early life and education ==
Jackson was born in Aiken, South Carolina, on April 1, 1907, and raised Methodist. At the age of 15 he moved to Harlem, New York, where he enrolled in Stuyvesant High School. During this time, he became interested in African-American history and culture and began writing essays on the subject. His work was noticed and in 1925, while still a high school student, Jackson was invited to write for Marcus Garvey's newspaper, Negro World.

== Career ==
From 1930 onwards, Jackson became associated with a number of Pan-African historians, activists and writers, including Hubert Harrison, Arturo Alfonso Schomburg, John Henrik Clarke, Willis Nathaniel Huggins, Joel Augustus Rogers, and Marcus Garvey. He also authored a number of books on African history, promoting a Pan-African and Afrocentrist view, such as Man, God, and Civilization (1972) and Introduction to African Civilizations (1974). He also became interested in the fringe view claiming Christianity's origins to be in the Egyptian religion. An unapologetic atheist, he authored a number of books such as The African Origin of Christianity (1981) and Christianity before Christ (1985), as well as writing the foreword to Gerald Massey's Lectures (1974). He also wrote the controversial text, Was Jesus Christ a Negro? (1984), which argued that Jesus may have been a black man. In 1987, Jackson wrote a biographical article about Hubert Harrison for American Atheists entitled "Hubert Henry Harrison: The Black Socrates". In it, he praised not only Harrison's agnostic atheism, but also his educational and civil rights achievements. It was later published as a seven-page pamphlet.

Jackson had previously lauded Harrison, and other Black atheists of Harlem, in a 1984 speech at the American Atheists national convention entitled 'The Black Atheists of the Harlem Renaissance'.

During the five decades that he lived in New York, Jackson lectured at the Robert G. Ingersoll Forum of the American Association for the Advancement of Atheism. In his senior years, he revealed that he'd disbelieved in God from the moment he was old enough to think.

Throughout his life, Jackson also served as associate director of the Blyden Society and lectured at many colleges and universities throughout the United States. He died on October 13, 1993.

== Selected bibliography ==
- Ethiopia and the Origin of Civilization (1939)
- Pagan Origins of the Christ Myth (1941)
- Man, God, and Civilization (1972)
- Introduction to African Civilizations (1974)
- Foreword to Gerald Massey's Lectures (1974)
- The Mysteries of Egypt (1980)
- The African Origin of Christianity (1981)
- "Egypt and Christianity" in, Ivan van Sertima, ed., Egypt Revisited, pap. 65–80 (New Brunswick: Journal of African Civilisations, Volume 4, Number 2, 1982)
- The African Origin of the Myths and Legends of the Garden of Eden (1984)
- Was Jesus Christ a Negro? (1984)
- Christianity Before Christ (1985)
- Black Reconstruction in South Carolina (1987)
- The Golden Ages of Africa (1987)
- Hubert H. Harrison: The Black Socrates (1987)
- Ages of Gold and Silver and Other Short Sketches of Human History (1990)
- Introduction to The Story of the Moors in Spain (1990)
- The Empire of the Moors (1992)
- Krishna and Buddha: Black Gods of Asia. African Presence Early Asia (1996)

== See also ==
- Pan-Africanism
- Afrocentrism
- Black Nationalism
- Willis Nathaniel Huggins
- Gerald Massey
- Kersey Graves
- Hubert Harrison
- Arturo Alfonso Schomburg
- John Henrik Clarke
- African diaspora
- Yosef Ben-Jochannan
- Chancellor Williams
- Cheikh Anta Diop
