= John Henrik Clarke =

African-American historian (1915–1998)

- Born: John Henry Clark; January 1, 1915; Union Springs, Alabama, U.S.
- Died: July 16, 1998 (aged 83); Manhattan, New York City, U.S.
- Education: New York University; Columbia University; Hunter College; New School of Social Research
- Occupations: Writer, historian, professor
- Known for: Founder of the African Heritage Studies Association and the Black Caucus of the African Studies Association

John Henrik Clarke (born John Henry Clark; January 1, 1915 – July 16, 1998) was an African-American historian, professor, prominent Afrocentrist, and pioneer of Pan-African and Africana studies and professional institutions in academia starting in the late 1960s.

== Early life and education ==
He was born John Henry Clark on January 1, 1915, in Union Springs, Alabama, the youngest child of John Clark, a sharecropper, and Willie Ella Clark, a washer woman, who died in 1922. With the hopes of earning enough money to buy land rather than sharecrop, his family moved to the closest mill town in Columbus, Georgia.

Counter to his mother's wishes for him to become a farmer, Clarke left Georgia in 1933 by freight train and went to Harlem, New York, as part of the Great Migration of rural blacks out of the South to northern cities. There he pursued scholarship and activism. He renamed himself as John Henrik (after rebel Norwegian playwright Henrik Ibsen) and added an "e" to his surname, spelling it as "Clarke". He also joined the U.S. Army during World War II.

Clarke was heavily influenced by Cheikh Anta Diop, who inspired his piece "The Historical Legacy of Cheikh Anta Diop: His Contributions to a New Concept of African History". Clarke believed that the credited Greek philosophers gained much of their theories and thoughts from contact with Africans, who influenced the early Western world.

== Positions in academia ==
From 1969 to 1986, Clarke was a professor of Black and Puerto Rican Studies at Hunter College of the City University of New York, where he served as founding chairman of the department. He was also the Carter G. Woodson Distinguished Visiting professor of African History at Cornell University's Africana Studies and Research Center. Additionally, in 1968 he founded the African Heritage Studies Association and the Black Caucus of the African Studies Association.

In its obituary of Clarke, The New York Times noted that the activist's ascension to professor emeritus at Hunter College was "unusual... without benefit of a high school diploma, let alone a Ph.D." It acknowledged that "nobody said Professor Clarke wasn't an academic original".

In 1994, Clarke earned a doctorate from the non-accredited Pacific Western University (now California Miramar University) in Los Angeles, having earned a bachelor's degree there in 1992.

== Career ==
By the 1920s, the Great Migration and demographic changes had led to a concentration of African Americans living in Harlem. A synergy developed among the artists, writers, and musicians and many figured in the Harlem Renaissance. They began to implement supporting structures of study groups and informal workshops to develop newcomers and young people.

Arriving in Harlem at the age of 18 in 1933, Clarke developed as a writer and lecturer during the Great Depression years. He joined study circles such as the Harlem History Club and the Harlem Writers' Workshop. He studied intermittently at New York University, Columbia University, Hunter College, the New School of Social Research and the League for Professional Writers. He was an autodidact whose mentors included the scholar Arturo Alfonso Schomburg. From 1941 to 1945, Clarke served as a non-commissioned officer in the United States Army Air Forces, ultimately attaining the rank of master sergeant.

In the post-World War II era, there was new artistic development, with small presses and magazines being founded and surviving for brief times. Writers and publishers continued to start new enterprises: Clarke was co-founder of the Harlem Quarterly (1949–51), book review editor of the Negro History Bulletin (1948–52), associate editor of the magazine Freedomways, and a feature writer for the black-owned Pittsburgh Courier.

Clarke taught at the New School for Social Research from 1956 to 1958. Traveling in West Africa in 1958–59, he met Kwame Nkrumah, whom he had mentored as a student in the U.S., and was offered a job working as a journalist for the Ghana Evening News. He also lectured at the University of Ghana and elsewhere in Africa, including in Nigeria at the University of Ibadan.

On the first anniversary of the Cuban Revolution a group of black civil rights activists, composed of Clarke, Harold Cruse, Amiri Baraka, and Julian Mayfield, travelled to Havana in a trip organised by the Fair Play for Cuba Committee.

Becoming prominent during the Black Power movement in the 1960s, which began to advocate a kind of black nationalism, Clarke advocated for studies of the African-American experience and the place of Africans in world history. He challenged the views of academic historians and helped shift the way African history was studied and taught. Clarke was "a scholar devoted to redressing what he saw as a systematic and racist suppression and distortion of African history by traditional scholars". He accused his detractors of having Eurocentric views.

His writing included six scholarly books and many scholarly articles. He also edited anthologies of writing by African-Americans, as well as collections of his own short stories. In addition, Clarke published general interest articles. In one especially heated controversy, he edited and contributed to an anthology of essays by African-Americans attacking the white writer William Styron, and his novel The Confessions of Nat Turner, for his fictional portrayal of the African-American slave known for leading a rebellion in Virginia.

Besides teaching at Hunter College and Cornell University, Clarke founded professional associations to support the study of black culture. He was a founder with Leonard Jeffries and first president of the African Heritage Studies Association, which supported scholars in areas of history, culture, literature, and the arts. He was a founding member of other organizations to support work in black culture: the Black Academy of Arts and Letters and the African-American Scholars' Council. Clarke also wrote the foreword to a book by Michael Bradley, Chosen People from the Caucasus.

== Personal life ==
Clarke's first marriage was to the mother of his daughter Lillie (who died before her father). They divorced.

In 1961, Clarke married Eugenia Evans in New York, and together they had a daughter and son: Nzingha Marie and Sonni Kojo. The marriage ended in divorce.

In 1997, John Henrik Clarke married his longtime companion, Sybil Williams. He died of a heart attack on July 16, 1998, at St. Luke's Hospital in New York City. He was buried in Green Acres Cemetery, Columbus, Georgia.

== Legacy and honors ==
- 1985 – Faculty of the Africana Studies and Research Center at Cornell University named the John Henrik Clarke Library after him.
- 1995 – Carter G. Woodson Medallion, Association for the Study of Afro-American Life and History.
- 1996 - St. Clair Bourne directs a documentary John Henrik Clarke: A Great and Mighty Walk, narrated and produced by Wesley Snipes.
- 2011 – Immortal Technique includes a short speech by Dr. Clarke on his album The Martyr. It is Track 13, which is entitled "The Conquerors".

== Selected bibliography ==
- Editor and contributor, William Styron's Nat Turner: Ten Black Writers Respond (1968). (Other contributors are Lerone Bennett Jr., Alvin F. Poussaint, Vincent Harding, John Oliver Killens, John A. Williams, Ernest Kaiser, Loyle Hairston, Charles V. Hamilton, and Mike Thelwell.)
- Editor and contributor, with the assistance of Amy Jacques Garvey, Marcus Garvey and the Vision of Africa (1974)
- The Boy Who Painted Jesus Black (1975)
- Editor, Malcolm X: Man and His Times (1991), an anthology of the activist's writing
- Anna Swanston (2003). Dr. John Henrik Clarke: his life, his words, his works. IAM Unlimited Pub. ISBN 978-1-929526-06-2.
- Africans at the Crossroads: Notes for an African World Revolution
- Rebellion in Rhyme: The Early Poetry of John Henrik Clarke
- New Dimensions in African World History: The London Lectures of Dr. Yosef ben-Jochannan and Dr. John Henrik Clarke
- Christopher Columbus and the Afrikan Holocaust: Slavery and the Rise of European Capitalism
- African People in World History
- My Life in Search of Africa
- Who Betrayed the African World Revolution? And other Speeches
- Critical Lessons in Slavery and the Slave Trade: Essential Studies and Commentaries on Slavery, in General, and the African Slave Trade, in Particular
- Ahmed Baba: A Scholar of Old Africa
- The Image of Africa in the Mind of the Afro-American: African Identity in the Literature of Struggle
- A New Approach to African History
- On the Other Side: A Story of the Color Line, Opportunity: A Journal of Negro Life, Vol. 17, No. 9 (September 1939): 269–270.

== Short stories by John Henrik Clarke ==
- "On the Other Side: A Story of the Color Line", Opportunity: A Journal of Negro Life, Vol. 17, No. 9 (September 1939): 269–270.
- "Leader of the Mob: A Story of the Color Line", Opportunity: A Journal of Negro Life, Vol. 17, No. 10 (October 1939), p. 301-303.
- "Santa Claus is a White Man: A Story of the Color Line", Opportunity: A Journal of Negro Life, Vol. 17, No. 12 (December 1939), pp. 365–367.
- "The Boy Who Painted Christ Black: A Short Story", Opportunity: A Journal of Negro Life, Vol. 18, No. 9 (September 1940), pp. 264–266.
- "Prelude to an Education: A Short Story", Opportunity: A Journal of Negro Life, Vol. 18, No. 11 (November 1940), pp. 335+
- "Return to the Inn", The Crisis, Vol. 48, No. 9 (September 1941), pp. 288+
- "The Bridge", Harlem Quarterly, Vol. 1, No. 1 (Winter 1949–1950), pp. 2–8.
- "Return of the Askia", Harlem Quarterly, Vol. 1, No. 2 (Spring 1950), pp. 45–49.
- "Journey to Sierra Maestra", Freedomways, Vol. 1, No. 2 (Spring 1961), pp. 32–35.
- "The Morning Train to Ibadan", Journal of Negro Education, Vol. 31, No. 4 (Autumn 1962), pp. 527–530.
- "Third Class on the Blue Train to Kumasi", Phylon, Vol. 23, 3rd Quarter (Fall 1962), pp. 294–301.
- "Revolt of the Angels - A Short Story", Freedomways, Vol. 3, No. 3 (Summer 1963): pp. 355–360.

== See also ==
- Ivan van Sertima
- Hubert Harrison
- Arturo Alfonso Schomburg-Schomburg personal books became Schomburg Library before it became a part of the New York Public Library system
- John G. Jackson
- Yosef Ben-Jochannan
- Chancellor Williams
- Jacob Carruthers
- Marcus Garvey
- Cheikh Anta Diop
- Amos N. Wilson
- List of people from Harlem
