= Willis Nathaniel Huggins =

Willis Nathaniel Huggins (February 7, 1886 – July 15?, 1941) was a historian and social activist. He was one of the earliest proponents of teaching African and African-American history in American schools.

== Early life ==
Huggins was born in Selma, Alabama, but moved to Washington D.C., with his family when he was still young. After university, he moved to Chicago, Illinois where he worked as a high school teacher. During the Chicago Race Riot of 1919, Huggins became involved in the New Negro Movement, writing for a number of pro African-American journals. He also became involved in the "Garvey movement" to popularise African-American history, along with Arthur Schomburg and John Edward Bruce.

In 1924, Huggins moved to New York City to continue his teaching. Black teachers were quite still unusual in the New York public school system, and Huggins' attempts to include African and African-American history within the curriculum were met with strong opposition. Instead, Huggins and other black teachers taught out-of-school classes on African-American history to students. In 1932 he became the first black student to receive a PhD from Fordham University.

== Work ==
Huggins's main goal was to promote the serious study of African and African-American history, which he did as associate director of the Blyden Society. In 1934 he co-wrote A Guide to the Study of African History with John G. Jackson as a prospective guide to teaching African history in schools. The two later wrote An Introduction to African Civilizations with Main Currents in Ethiopian History in 1937.

Huggins was also a passionate campaigner for Ethiopia during the Italo-Ethiopian War and its subsequent occupation by Italy. He became executive director of the International African Friends of Abyssinia and was sent by the American League Against War and Fascism as a special envoy to the League of Nations in Geneva on behalf of Ethiopia, where he argued against Italian fascism and criticised American neutrality.

== Death ==
Huggins went missing on December 23, 1940. The only clues to his whereabouts were an overcoat that had been found on the George Washington Bridge and a letter that Huggins sent to his wife stating that "Something is going to happen." At the time of his disappearance, Huggins was teaching history and economics at Bushwick High School in Brooklyn and serving as Assistant Principal at Harlem's Union High School in the evening. Seven months later, on July 15, 1941, his body was recovered from the Hudson River by police. His death was ruled a suicide by the police, his family, and his lawyer. Despite this, some of his students at the Blyden Society and Harlem community centre voiced concerns that he may have been murdered by gangsters over unpaid business loans.

== See also ==
- Arthur Schomburg
- John G. Jackson
- Marcus Garvey
- Black history month
