= Hucheshwar Gurusidha Mudgal =

Indian political activist

Hucheshwar Gurusidha Mudgal (2 September 1899, Hubli-19??) was an Indian political activist who became prominent in Marcus Garvey's Universal Negro Improvement Association working on the Daily Negro Times and Negro World. Born in India, he arrived in New York City in 1920, where he stayed for seventeen years.

He was educated at City College of New York and Columbia University where he gained an M.A.

He returned to India in 1937 where he became a member of parliament for the Congress Party, but was forced to resign in a corruption scandal in 1951. He published an article about Bal Gandharva in The Times of India in 1967.
