= Ida D. Bailey =

American teacher and civil rights activist (1866–1908)

- Ida D. Bailey at the 1906 Niagara Movement Conference at Harpers Ferry

Ida D. Bailey (1866–1908) was an American teacher and civil rights activist in Washington, D.C.. She was active in the Niagara Movement, an African-American civil rights organization.

== Biography ==
She was born on August 13, 1866, in Roxboro, North Carolina. When she was 11 years old she started at Scotia Seminary in Concord, North Carolina. She later studied at Shaw University. She taught in schools in Virginia and North Carolina. In 1891 she married physician Henry L. Bailey, and moved to Washington, D.C.

She was involved in the Niagara Movement's 1906 Niagara Movement Conference at Harpers Ferry, West Virginia; and was photographed at it with other participants which is now part of the 'F. H. M. Murray Papers' at Howard University. William Henry Ferris lauded her work for civil rights and educational opportunities for African Americans. She was one of the founders of the Colored Woman's League. In 1892 she was one of the founders of the National Colored Women's League, an organization in Washington, D.C. with the goals of improving racial and social progress. She was president of the Dunbar Circle of the Niagara Movement, which operated as a club in Washington D.C.

Bailey was a popular speaker who was described as an "earnest and convincing speaker", and spoke in venues such as the Bethel Literary and Historical Society. She felt blacks should be able to attend gatherings at the White House without embarrassment. She defended African Americans who attended events at the White House against critics who promoted segregation and white supremacy.

== See also ==
- Helen Appo Cook
