= Daily Negro Times =

African American newspaper

The Daily Negro Times was an African American newspaper published in New York City by Marcus Garvey in 1922. Garvey bought a second hand newspaper press on which to print the paper and equipped the editorial office with a United Press ticker tape, probably the first African American newspaper to have such a facility.

Garvey appointed himself executive editor and his team consisted of:

- Timothy Thomas Fortune, editor
- Ulysses S. Poston, managing editor
- William Alexander Stephenson, news editor
- Joel Augustus Rogers news sub-editor
- John Edward Bruce, journalist
- Hucheshwar Gurusidha Mudgal, journalist
- Robert Lincoln Poston, journalist
