= Judicial aspects of race in the United States =

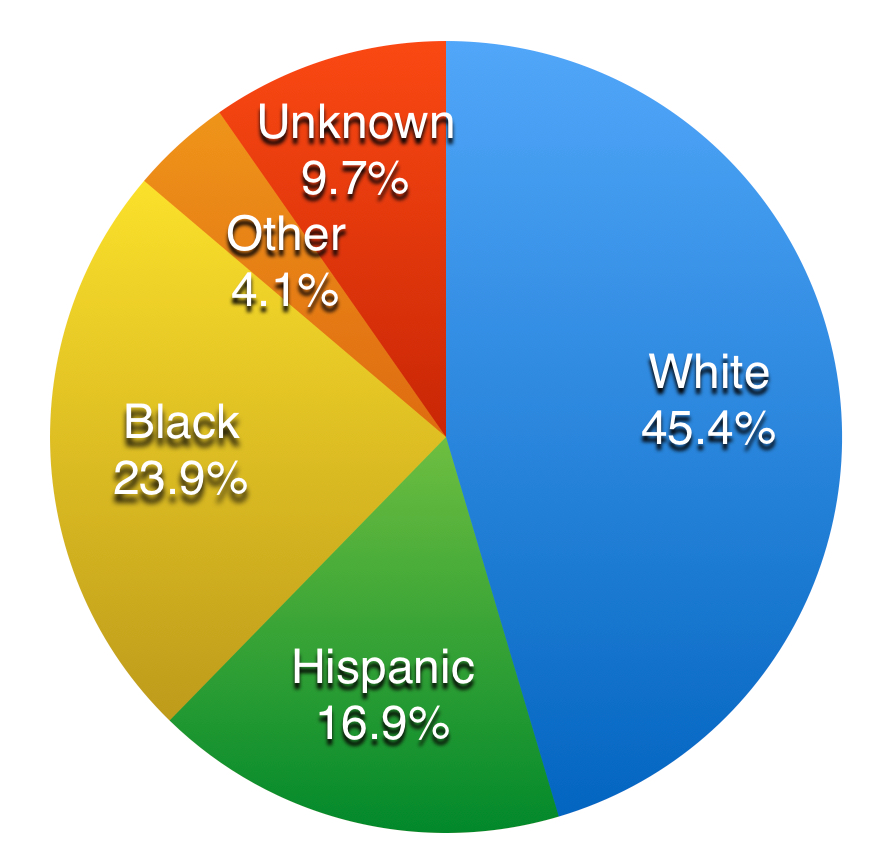
Distribution of US police killings by race category of the deceased (2015 through 2019)

Legislation seeking to direct relations between racial or ethnic groups in the United States has had several historical phases, developing from the European colonization of the Americas, the triangular slave trade, and the American Indian Wars. The 1776 Declaration of Independence included the statement that "all men are created equal", which has ultimately inspired actions and legislation against slavery and racial discrimination. Such actions have led to passage of the 13th, 14th, and 15th Amendments to the Constitution of the United States.

The first period extended until the American Civil War and the Reconstruction era, the second period spanned the nadir of American race relations period until the early 20th century, and the last period began with World War II and the civil rights movement, which led to the repeal of racial segregation laws. Racial legislation has been intertwined with immigration laws, which sometimes included specific provisions against particular nationalities or ethnicities, such as the Chinese Exclusion Act and the 1923 United States v. Bhagat Singh Thind case in the US Supreme Court. Race remains an active area of contention with police killings disproportionate to the racial distribution of the US population; whites are under-represented and blacks are over-represented.

== Until American Civil War and Reconstruction ==
Until the American Civil War, slavery was legal. After the American Revolutionary War, the US Congress passed the Naturalization Act of 1790 to provide a way for foreigners to become citizens of the new country. It limited naturalization to aliens who were "free white persons" and thus left out indentured servants, slaves, free African Americans, and later Asians. In addition, many states enforced anti-miscegenation laws (such as Indiana in 1845), which prohibited marriage between whites and non-whites: blacks; mulattoes; and, in some states, Native Americans. After an influx of Chinese immigrants to the West Coast, marriages between whites and Asians were banned in some Western states.

After the Revolutionary War, most northern states abolished slavery, even if a gradually. Congress enacted fugitive slave laws in 1793 and 1850 to provide for the return of slaves who had escaped from a slave state to a free state or territory. Black Codes were adopted by several states, generally to constrain the actions and rights of free people of color, as slaves were controlled by slave law. Although most northern states had abolished slavery, several tried to discourage freedmen from settling in the state. In some states, the Black Codes were incorporated into or required by state constitutions, many of which were rewritten in the 1840s. For instance, Article 13 of Indiana's 1851 constitution stated, "No Negro or Mulatto shall come into, or settle in, the State, after the adoption of this Constitution." Illinois's 1848 constitution led to one of the harshest Black Code systems in the nation before the Civil War. The Illinois Black Code of 1853 completely prohibited black immigration to the state.

=== Native Americans ===
The Indian Removal Act of 1830 legalized deportation of Native Americans to the West and was passed primarily to extinguish Native American tribal claims to territory in what became known as the Deep South. It effectively allowed the federal government to remove the Five Civilized Tribes to Indian Territory. The Indian Intercourse Act of 1837 created the Indian Territory, now in Kansas and Oklahoma, where the tribes would be resettled. While the tribes retained self-government and territory, their peoples were generally not considered US citizens.

The largest federal establishment of Indian reservations began with the Indian Appropriations Acts in the 1850s. The Dawes Act of 1887 registered members of the so-called Five Civilized Tribes and included the privatization of common holdings of Indians. Blood quantum laws determined membership in Native American groups. Some of the measures were repealed by the 1934 Indian Reorganization Act, which allowed a return to local self-government. Citizenship was not granted to Native Americans until the Indian Citizenship Act of 1924, but two thirds of Native Americans had already become citizens because of other laws.

=== Abolition of slavery and extension of citizenship ===
In 1857, Dred Scott v. Sandford, a "freedom suit" that was appealed to the US Supreme Court, was settled with the ruling that the US Constitution had not included people of African descent, enslaved or free, and so could not be US citizens and thus had no standing to file freedom suits or other legal cases.

The victory of the North during the Civil War led to the abolition of slavery by the passing of the Thirteenth Amendment and the expansion of the civil rights of African Americans by the adoption of the Fourteenth Amendment. The Fifteenth Amendment prohibited disfranchisement on the basis of race. The Naturalization Act of 1870 allowed people of African descent to become naturalized US citizens.

=== Census ===
The first census was conducted in 1790 and had three racial categories: free whites, blacks, and all other free peoples. Over time, the categorizations evolved to reflect a more complex understanding of race, but the development of new categories often served a political purpose. Issues such as the true whiteness of Southern European immigrants could not be addressed in the census, but anti-black and anti-Native American sentiment were supported by the racial categorization in the census.

Americans feared that mixed-race citizens would be able to reap the benefits of being white and so instituted laws to prevent that. Mixed-race citizens could legally categorize themselves as white because of their ability to self-report race to the census bureau, the requirement of choosing only one racial category, and the ability of those who were only marginally black to appear white. By 1890, people were required to report any degree of African or Native American ancestry. The idea that a single drop of African or Indian blood qualified someone as officially black or Native American was a generally obeyed legal principle although the so-called one-drop rule was never codified federally. That qualification prevented mixed-race individuals from ever obtaining the benefits of whiteness.

== Nadir of American race relations ==
After the end of the Reconstruction era, southern whites reasserted political and social supremacy with the violence and the discrimination that caused the nadir of American race relations. There were increasing racial violence, lynchings, and attacks to intimidate blacks and to repress their voting in the South. After regaining power in the state legislatures in the 1870s, white Democrats passed legislation to impose electoral requirements that effectively disfranchised black voters. From 1890 to 1910, Southern states ratified constitutional amendments or new constitutions that increased requirements for voter registration, which resulted in disfranchising most blacks and many poor whites (as in Alabama). With political control in what was effectively a one-party system, the South passed Jim Crow laws and instituted racial segregation in public facilities. In 1896, the Supreme Court ruled in favor of the defendants in the Plessy v. Ferguson case, which established the "separate but equal" interpretation for the provision of services. Without the vote, however, black residents in the South found their segregated facilities consistently underfunded and were without recourse in the legal system, as only voters could sit on juries or hold office. Blacks were closed out of the political process in most states. In 1899, Cumming v. Richmond County Board of Education legalized segregation in schools.

=== Anti-miscegenation laws ===
Anti-miscegenation laws prohibited marriages of European Americans with Americans of African descent, even those of mixed race. Some states also prohibited marriages across ethnic lines with Native Americans and later Asians. Such laws had been first passed during the Colonial era in several of the Thirteen Colonies, starting with Virginia in 1691. After the American Revolutionary War, several of the newly independent states repealed such laws. However, all slave states and many free states enforced such laws in the Antebellum era.

During Reconstruction, when biracial Republican coalitions controlled the legislatures, several Southern states repealed anti-miscegenation laws. As Democrats returned to power, between 1870 and 1884, legislatures passed anti-miscegenation laws in all the states of the Confederacy to re-establish white supremacy.

Western states that were newly admitted to the Union after the Civil War passed anti-miscegenation laws which were often directed against marriage between Europeans and the increasing Asian immigrant population in addition to prohibiting marriage with blacks and Native Americans. For instance, Utah's marriage law had an anti-miscegenation component passed in 1899. Until it was repealed in 1963, it prohibited marriage between a white and anyone considered a Negro (Black American), mulatto (half black), quadroon (one-quarter black), octoroon (one-eighth black), "Mongolian" (East Asian), or member of the "Malay race" (a historic racial classification that included Filipinos). No restriction was placed on interracial marriages between non-whites.

=== Sundown towns and housing discrimination ===
In the late 19th century, sundown towns began to post warnings against blacks who stayed overnight. Some passed laws against minorities; others erected signs, such as one posted in the 1930s in Hawthorne, California, which read, "Nigger, Don't Let The Sun Set On YOU In Hawthorne." Discrimination was also accomplished through restrictive covenants in residential areas that were agreed to by the community's real estate agents. In others, the policy was enforced by intimidation, including harassment by law enforcement officers.

In addition to the expulsion of African Americans from "sundown towns", Chinese Americans were driven out of some towns. For example, in 1870, ethnic Chinese made up one third of the population of Idaho, where they had worked on railroads and in mines. Following a wave of violence and an 1886 anti-Chinese convention in Boise, almost none remained by 1910. The town of Gardnerville, Nevada, blew a daily whistle at 6 p.m. to alert Native Americans to leave by sundown. Jewish Americans were excluded from living in some sundown towns.

HOLC's 1936 security map of Philadelphia showing redlining of minority neighborhoods. People who lived in the red zones could not get mortgages to buy or to improve their homes.

The National Housing Act of 1934 established the Federal Housing Administration (FHA) to try to encourage home ownership during the Great Depression, but another consequence was redlining. In 1935, the Federal Home Loan Bank Board (FHLBB) asked the Home Owners' Loan Corporation (HOLC) to assess 239 cities and develop "residential security maps" to indicate the level of security for real estate investments in each surveyed city. Because of older housing in minority neighborhoods and the undervaluation of minority readiness to work and protect their homes, the agency defined certain areas as high risk. That prevented many residents of minority neighborhoods from being able to get mortgages or loans to renovate their properties. Redlining had the unanticipated result of increased residential racial segregation and encouraging urban decay in the United States. Urban planning historians theorize that the maps were later used for years by public and private entities to deny loans to people in black communities.

=== Racial construction and immigration ===
In 1751, American Benjamin Franklin classified the world's population into four different colors: black, tawny, swarthy, and white. Franklin classified as the French, Germans, Russians, and Swedes as swarthy, as he only considered the English as white. During the first major waves of immigration to the United States, ethnicities now generally considered white were not thought of as such, including Southern and Eastern Europeans. The new populations came from Eastern and Southern Europe and were Catholic and Jewish, as opposed to the majority population in the United States of Northern and Western European and African American Protestants. The popularity of eugenics as well as the perception that the new groups were undermining American culture and values led to their classification as nonwhite. That gave the government the opportunity to attempt to curtail the immigration of specific groups by using the National Origins Formula.

Two factors contributed to the eventual acceptance of the new groups as white. They proved their racial distinction from and superiority to blacks by supporting slavery and engaging in violence toward free blacks. That behavior was especially noted among the Irish. Secondly, they participated in the Civil War, demonstrating their patriotism and commitment to the United States and their ability to be a part of American society.

Importantly, the era also saw the Yick Wo v. Hopkins case in 1886, the first case in which the US Supreme Court ruled that a law that was race-neutral on its face but administered discriminatorily to be an infringement of the Equal Protection Clause. Although the law that banned wood laundries did not specify a certain race, it resulted in specifically radicalized impacts, and Yick Wo's lawyers discovered that the Chinese were singled out within the recorded minutes of the meeting. The case established that a law with unequal impact is discriminatory and therefore unconstitutional, and it also strengthened the equal protection outlined in the 14th Amendment.

==== Counter-narratives ====
Although much of the scholarship on studies of whiteness argues that Southern and Eastern Europeans were treated as nonwhite by earlier immigrants, there is also a substantial body of scholarship countering that narrative, most notably White on Arrival: Italians, Race, Color, and Power in Chicago, 1890–1945 by the historian Thomas A. Guglielmo. He and others contend that Italians were in fact considered white and were able to reap the immediate benefits that status conferred, such as a right to citizenship, although they were somewhat discriminated against for their nationality. He specifically attempts to differentiate between color and race by claiming that although Italians were racially Italian, when they considered in a more binary manner, they were still white in color. That undeniable classification as phenotypically white allowed them, along with other Southern and European immigrants, to obtain all the benefits conferred by whiteness. The historian and anthropologist Patrick Wolfe makes a similar argument by saying that the experience of the European immigrant is simply incomparable to that of a black American, which makes the evidence of their whiteness indisputable.

=== National Origins Formula ===
The 1921 Emergency Quota Act and the Immigration Act of 1924 restricted immigration according to national origins. While the Emergency Quota Act used the 1910 census, xenophobic fears in the WASP community lead to the adoption of the 1890 census, which was more favorable to the WASP population, in the Immigration Act, which responded to the rising immigration from Southern and Eastern Europe as well as Asia.

The National Origins Formula was established in 1929 explicitly to keep the status quo's distribution of ethnicity by allocating quotas in proportion to the actual population. The idea was that immigration would not be allowed to change the "national character." The total annual immigration was capped at 150,000. Asians were excluded, but residents of nations in the Americas were not restricted, which made official the racial discrimination in immigration laws. The system was repealed with the Immigration and Nationality Act of 1965, but currently implemented immigration laws are still largely subject to national origin-based quotas.

=== "Yellow Peril" ===
The 1868 Burlingame Treaty encouraged Chinese immigration to meet labor needs, especially on Western railroads. However, only a few years later, the need for foreign labor declined as more Americans moved West. As gold mining became less fruitful, hostility toward Asian competition increased. Violence against Asians was prevalent, leading to the largest lynching in American history, the Los Angeles Chinese massacre of 1871. Consequently, a barrage of legislation was passed to restrict Asian immigration, a group that was now characterized as the "Yellow Peril". The enforcement of the legislation required a more concrete formation of what the Asian race entailed, and the courts were used to construct it.

==== Key legislation ====
Legislation	Description
Page Act of 1875	This had two primary provisions. One cracked down on coolie labor practices in which Asians would be transported to the United States against their will and forced to be indentured servants. The other had far-broader reaching implications by strictly prohibiting the immigration of prostitutes, especially from Asia. That led to the de facto barring of all Asian immigrant women, who were almost always accused of being prostitutes, a claim that was almost impossible to disprove. Although the law was unsuccessful in curtailing the immigration of Asian men, the flow of women stopped almost entirely.
Chinese Exclusion Act of 1882	This replaced the 1868 Burlingame Treaty, provided that Chinese living in the United States would be able to live there free of religious persecution, and greatly restricted future immigration from China.
Immigration Act of 1917	This created an "Asiatic Barred Zone" under nativist influence.
Cable Act of 1922	This guaranteed independent female citizenship only to women who were married to "alien[s] eligible to naturalization." Asian aliens were then not considered to be racially eligible for US citizenship. As such, the Cable Act only partially reversed previous policies by granting independent female citizenship only to women who married non-Asians. The Cable Act effectively revoked the US citizenship of any woman who married an Asian alien.
Immigration Act of 1924	This included a reference aimed against Japanese citizens, who were ineligible for naturalization and could not be accepted on US territory.

==== Asian immigration and "Whiteness" ====
Discriminatory laws were mostly enacted according to national origins, but also involved racial typologies developed by scientific racism theorists. While those who were racially Asian were excluded from obtaining US citizenship, immigration from Asian countries was not entirely barred. A small quota allowed for the emigration of white residents from these countries. These racial naturalization requirements necessitated the more concrete ideation of the category of “Asian” as distinct from white so immigrants could be rejected on the basis of race instead of national origin. This need was quickly supplied by a plethora of judicial rulings and pieces of legislation focused primarily on classifications based contradictorily on phenotypic features, scientific objectivism, and "common knowledge", depending on the case. The two most important cases are Ozawa v. United States (1922) and United States v. Bhagat Singh Thind (1923).

Japanese-born Takao Ozawa applied for citizenship after living in the United States for 20 years, but his application was denied because he was not considered white. Ozawa argued that he was physically whiter than many people considered "white" and thus should also be considered such. The courts rejected this, claiming that Japanese were not considered scientifically to be a part of the Caucasian race since they were not from the Caucasus region.

The following year, Indian Bhagat Singh Thind argued that since he was both technically Caucasian and Aryan he should be considered white. Indian Americans were not classified as members of any race until the end of the 19th century. Prior to this case, Indians were sometimes granted citizenship on this premise, but Thind's citizenship was in the process of being revoked for the second time when he sued the United States. The US Supreme Court altered its approach and said that while he may be technically Caucasian, common knowledge does not equate Caucasian with the general understanding of "white". Justice George Sutherland delivered the opinion on the unanimous ruling, stating that the "white" race must be interpreted "in accordance with the understanding of the common man from whose vocabulary they were taken". This ruling, which officially classified all Indians as non-white, retroactively stripped Indians of citizenship and land rights. The decision was intended to placate racist Asiatic Exclusion League (AEL) demands, which were growing in proportion to increasing outrage at the "Hindu Invasion" alongside the pre-existing outrage at the "Yellow Peril". While mid-20th-century legislation has removed much of the statutory discrimination against Asians, no case has overturned this 1923 classification. Hence, this classification remains, and is still relevant today because many laws and quotas are race-based.

== 1940s onward ==
=== World War II ===
President Franklin D. Roosevelt enacted discriminatory practices with Executive Order 9066 in February 1942, which paved the way for Japanese American internment. About 120,000 people of Japanese descent, including both American and Japanese citizens, were interned during the war. Americans of Italian and German descent, along with Italian and German nationals, were also interned but on a much smaller scale (see Italian American internment and German American internment), despite both Italy and Germany joining Japan in the war against the United States. In Korematsu v. United States (1944), the Supreme Court upheld the executive order in the first instance of its application of strict scrutiny to racial discrimination by the government; it was one of only a handful of cases in which the Supreme Court held that the government met that standard.

Other cases pertaining to Japanese American internment included Yasui v. United States (1943), Hirabayashi v. United States (1943), and Ex parte Endo (1944). In Yasui and Hirabayashi, the court upheld the constitutionality of curfews based on Japanese ancestry. In Endo, the court accepted a petition for a writ of habeas corpus and ruled that the War Relocation Authority (WRA, created by Executive Order 9102) had no authority to subject a citizen whose loyalty was acknowledged to its procedures.

Despite renewed xenophobic fears concerning the "Yellow Peril", the 1943 Magnuson Act repealed the Chinese Exclusion Act and permitted some Chinese immigrants already residing in the US to become naturalized citizens.

In 1983, the Commission on Wartime Relocation and Internment of Civilians (CWRIC) concluded that the incarceration of Japanese Americans had not been justified by military necessity. Rather, the report determined that the decision to detain Japanese Americans had been based on "race prejudice, war hysteria, and a failure of political leadership."

=== Aftermath of World War II ===
The United Nations Participation Act of 1945, passed after the victory of the Allies, included provisions that immigration policy should be conducted in a fair manner and nondiscriminatory fashion.

In 1946, Democratic President Harry S. Truman ended racial segregation in the Armed Forces by Executive Order 9981. Later that year, the US Congress passed the Luce–Celler Act of 1946, which effectively ended statutory discrimination against Filipino Americans and Indian Americans, who had been considered "unassimilable," along with most other Asian Americans.

In 1947, Mendez v. Westminster challenged racial segregation in California schools applied against Latinos. The Ninth Circuit Court of Appeal, in an en banc decision, held that the segregation of Mexican and Mexican American students into separate "Mexican schools" was unconstitutional. In 1954 Hernandez v. Texas, a federal court ruled that Mexican Americans and all other ethnic or "racial groups" in the United States had equal protection under the 14th Amendment.

The McCarran–Walter Act of 1952, or Immigration and Naturalization Act, "extended the privilege of naturalization to Japanese, Koreans, and other Asians." "The McCarran–Walter Act revised all previous laws and regulations regarding immigration, naturalization, and nationality, and brought them together into one comprehensive statute."

=== Civil rights movement and later ===
Legislation enacting racial segregation was finally overturned in the 1950s and the 1960s, after the nation had been morally challenged and educated by activists of the civil rights movement. In 1954, Brown v. Board of Education had the US Supreme Court rule that "separate but equal" was inherently discriminatory, and the integration of public schools was ordered. An executive order of 1961, by President John F. Kennedy, created the Equal Employment Opportunity Commission to oversee workplace affirmative action. In 1965, Executive Order 11246, signed by President Lyndon B. Johnson, enforced that policy. In the 1970s and the 1980s, the policy included court-supervised desegregation busing plans.

Over the next 20 years, a succession of court decisions and federal laws, including the Civil Rights Act of 1964, the Voting Rights Act of 1965, the 1972 Gates v. Collier Supreme Court ruling to end racial segregation in prisons, the Home Mortgage Disclosure Act (1975), and measures to end mortgage discrimination, prohibited de jure racial segregation and discrimination in the US.

The Immigration Act of 1965 discontinued some quotas based on national origin, with preference given to those who have US relatives. For the first time, Mexican and other Latin American immigration was restricted.

Residential segregation took various forms. Some state constitutions (such as that of California) had clauses giving local jurisdictions the right to regulate where members of certain "races" could live. Restrictive covenants in deeds had prevented minorities from purchasing properties from any subsequent owner. In the 1948 case of Shelley v. Kraemer, the US Supreme Court ruled that such covenants were unenforceable in a court of law. Residential segregation patterns had already become established in most American cities, but they have taken new forms in areas of increased immigration. New immigrant populations have typically moved into older areas to become established, and that pattern of population succession is seen in many areas. Many ethnic populations appear to prefer to live in areas of concentration, with their own foods, stores, religious institutions and other familiar services. People from a village or region often resettle close together in new areas, even as they move into suburban areas.

In 1978, American Indian Religious Freedom Act (AIRFA) was to preserve the rights of American Indians, Eskimos, Aleuts, and Native Hawaiians to traditional religious practices. Before the AIRFA was passed, certain US federal laws interfered with the traditional religious practices of many indigenous Americans.

Redistricting of voting districts has always been a political process and been manipulated by parties or power groups to try to gain advantage. In an effort to prevent African American populations from being divided to dilute their voting strength and representation, federal courts oversaw certain redistricting decisions in the South for decades to overturn the injustice of the previous century's disfranchisement.

Interpretations continue to change. In 1999, Hunt v. Cromartie had the US Supreme Court rule that the 12th electoral district of North Carolina to be unconstitutional as drawn. Determining that it was created to place African Americans in one district, which would have enabled them to elect a representative, the Court ruled that it constituted illegal racial gerrymander. The Court ordered the state to redraw the district's boundaries.

==== Hispanic immigration ====
Year	Legislation	Description
1848	Treaty of Guadalupe Hidalgo	This treaty signed at the end of the Mexican–American War established Mexicans as white and thus as eligible for US citizenship.
1924	Immigration Act of 1924	The first major restrictions on immigration are announced, and the term "illegal alien" is introduced to US vocabulary.
1942	Bracero Program	This program allowed Mexicans to work in the United States seasonally to fill the labor shortage in agriculture caused by World War II. From 1942 to 1964, it brought in approximately 200,000 braceros a year.
1965	Immigration and Nationality Act of 1965	This is the first instance of immigration from the Western Hemisphere being restricted. Despite the termination of the bracero program and the small number of visas available for unskilled Mexican workers, Mexican guestworkers were still sought, which led to an increase in illegal immigration. This is the first time that Mexican immigration could be classified as illegal.
1986	Immigration Reform and Control Act of 1986	As the Cold War reached Central America and the Mexican economy disintegrated, Latin American immigration increased. In response, amnesty was provided to all illegal immigrants already in the United States, but for the first time, severe penalties could be faced by anyone who employed or assisted an illegal immigrant in any way.
1996	Illegal Immigration Reform and Immigrant Responsibility Act of 1996	The primary purpose of this law was to increase penalties for illegal immigrants who commit crimes while in the United States, which was intended primarily to decrease alien smuggling and the use of false documents. Illegal immigrants could now be summarily deported for committing either a misdemeanor or a felony. Also, the border was now also increasingly militarized.

== See also ==
- Heart of Atlanta Motel v. United States
- Immigration to the United States
- List of United States immigration legislation
- NAACP v. Alabama
- National Origins Formula
- Racial classification of Indian Americans
- Racism in the United States
- Slavery in the United States
- Smith v. Allwright
- Yick Wo v. Hopkins
