= William Alexander Stephenson =

Jamaican journalist

William Alexander Stephenson (14 July 1873 – 1926) was a Jamaican journalist who emigrated to New York where he became involved in the Harlem Renaissance.

He attended Half Way Tree Middle Grade School, where the headmaster, H H Isaacs, suggested he become a journalist. After working for Gall’s News Letter, and The Telegraph he was taken on by the Daily Gleaner. His articles were generally attributed to W. A. Stephenson. He also wrote for the Jamaica Times. In 1913 he left journalism to become Chief Sanitary Officer.

Following the First World War, he and his wife emigrated to New York, where he returned to journalism. He published the West Indian Informer himself, went on to write for Negro World, and was managing editor of the Daily Negro Times.
