= Pittsburgh Courier =

Former newspaper in Pittsburgh, Pennsylvania, US

The Pittsburgh Courier
- Masthead of The Pittsburgh Courier
- Type: African American newspaper
- Format: Weekly newspaper
- Owner: John H. Sengstacke (1965–1966)
- Founder(s): Edwin Nathaniel Harleston, Edward Penman, Hepburn Carter, Scott Wood Jr., Harvey Tanner
- Editor: Robert Lee Vann (1910–1933, 1935–1940); P. L. Prattis (1956–1965)
- Founded: May 10, 1910; 115 years ago
- Ceased publication: October 22, 1966; 59 years ago
- Relaunched: New Pittsburgh Courier
- City: Pittsburgh, Pennsylvania
- Country: United States
- Circulation: 357,000 (as of 1947)

The Pittsburgh Courier was an African American weekly newspaper published in Pittsburgh from 1907 until October 22, 1966. By the 1930s, the Courier was one of the leading black newspapers in the United States.

It was acquired in 1965 by John H. Sengstacke, a major black publisher and owner of the Chicago Defender. He re-opened the paper in 1967 as the New Pittsburgh Courier, making it one of his four newspapers for the African American audience.

== Creation and incorporation ==
The paper was founded by Edwin Nathaniel Harleston, who worked as a guard at the H. J. Heinz Company food packing plant in Pittsburgh. Harleston, a self-published poet, began printing the paper at his own expense in 1907. Generally about two pages, it was primarily a vehicle for Harleston's work. He printed around ten copies, which he sold for five cents apiece.

In 1909, Edward Penman, Hepburn Carter, Scott Wood Jr., and Harvey Tanner joined Harleston to run the paper, although they did not contribute financially. They named the paper as Pittsburgh Courier, after the Post and Courier of Charleston, South Carolina, Harleston's hometown. Harleston prepared the copy of the first issue of the Courier at his home, and Penman and Carter ordered five hundred copies from a printer in Philadelphia. The five men sold most of the copies of this issue throughout the Hill District on January 5, 1910. During this period, Courier issues were four pages in length.

In early March 1910, Robert Lee Vann drew up incorporation papers for the Courier and began writing articles. Although the Courier was being printed by the Union News Company in Pittsburgh to save money, by March Harleston began to run out of money for the paper. Through Vann's connections, the paper was able to attract some wealthy investors, including Cumberland Willis Posey Sr. On May 10, 1910, the Pittsburgh Courier was formally incorporated, with Vann handling the legal means. During the summer, the paper was expanded from four to eight pages, but struggled with circulation and financial solvency due to a small market and lack of interested advertisers. In the fall of 1910, Harleston left the paper for financial and creative reasons. Vann became editor, a position he would hold until his death in 1940.

== Editorship of Robert L. Vann ==
The Courier under Vann prominently featured Vann's work as a lawyer and public figure. In the early 1910s, a staff of four (Vann, a secretary, a sports editor, and an errand boy who also proof-read and handled mail) operated from a spare room above a funeral parlor in the Hill District. But in 1914, the Courier moved to real offices on Fourth Avenue. As editor, Vann wrote editorials encouraging readers to only patronize business that paid for advertisements in the Courier and ran contests to attempt to increase circulation. In his Christmas editorial at the end of 1914, Vann wrote of the paper's intent to "abolish every vestige of Jim Crowism in Pittsburgh."

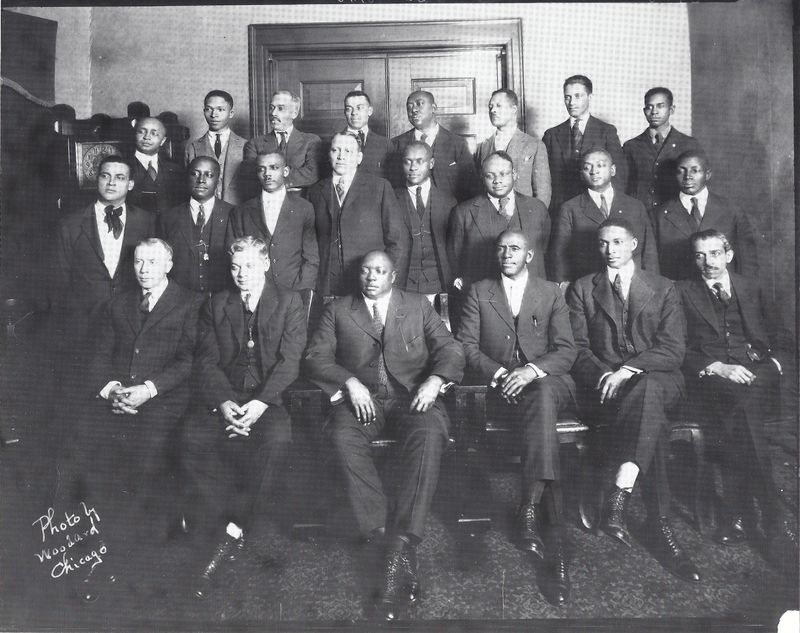
Ira Lewis, editor and later president of the Pittsburgh Courier, back row, far left, at the Negro National League annual meeting held in Chicago on January 28, 1922

In the 1920s, Vann made efforts to improve the quality of the news included in the growing paper. In November 1925, the Courier joined the Associated Negro Press, the news collective of African American publications. Under Vann, the "Local News" section of the Courier covered the social lives of the upper- and middle-class members of the Hill District. This included accounts of vacations, marriages, and parties of prominent families and the goings on of local groups, such as the Pittsburgh Frogs. Vann stirred up controversy—and 10,000 new readers—by hiring George Schuyler in 1925, whose editorials and opinions made him known as the "black H. L. Mencken" (who was a Courier subscriber). In addition to Schuyler's contributions, the paper also ran special features by writers such as Joel Augustus Rogers and serialized novels, such as Walter Francis White's Fire in the Flint. Sports was well covered by writers including Chester L. Washington, who began writing for the paper while still in high school in Pittsburgh, Wendell Smith, and Cumberland Posey, son of one of the first investors. The sports coverage focused on African American leagues, sometimes to the exclusion of white sporting events in Pittsburgh, including the 1927 World Series.

The Courier also worked as a tool for social progress. Most significantly, the paper extensively covered the injustices on African Americans perpetrated by the Pullman Company and supported the Brotherhood of Sleeping Car Porters. Vann wrote to gain support for causes such as improved housing conditions in the Hill District, better education for black students, and equal employment and union opportunities. However, Vann often used his Courier editorials to publicly fight with the National Association for the Advancement of Colored People (NAACP) and W. E. B. Du Bois over issues such as President Calvin Coolidge's grants of clemency to black soldiers involved in the Houston Riot and Vann's allegations that James Weldon Johnson embezzled money for personal use from the NAACP and the Garland Fund. This disharmony was resolved in 1929 by published apologies by Vann, Du Bois, and Johnson, and within the decade, Du Bois became a regular Courier contributor. But in 1938, Vann's Courier ended up at odds with the NAACP once again. Vann, through national campaigns and contact with President Franklin D. Roosevelt pursued inclusion of African American units in the United States Armed Forces. Vann saw this as an achievable step on the path to integration of the military, but the NAACP leadership, primarily Walter White, publicly disagreed with this half-measure, despite the protests of Thurgood Marshall. As a result of the Courier's influence and Vann's political clout, New York Congressman Hamilton Fish successfully added an amendment prohibiting racial discrimination in selection and training of men drafted to the Selective Training and Service Act of 1940.

In 1932, Vann officially put the Courier behind the party realignment of African Americans. He urged readers to vote for Democrats, writing, "My friends, go home and turn Lincoln's picture to the wall."

In 1927, the Courier's New York City branch manager, Floyd J. Calvin, began broadcasting the weekly "Pittsburgh Courier Hour" on New York radio. By 1928, the Courier's four editions (local, northern, eastern, and southern) were distributed in all 48 states and internationally, and by 1938, the paper was the largest American black weekly, with a circulation of 250,000. Vann legitimized the Courier with a professional staff, national advertisements, a dedicated printing plant, and wide circulation.

== Later years and legacy ==
Following Vann's death in late 1940, close associate Ira Lewis filled his role as president and executive editor. The Courier maintained its upward trajectory, reaching an all-time circulation high of 357,000 in 1947. When Lewis died in 1948, Vann's widow, Jessie Mathews Vann, assumed the role of president-treasurer.

Upon the entrance of the United States into World War Two, the editors of the Pittsburgh Courier nominated African American journalist Frank E. Bolden to be an accredited war correspondent. Bolden was one of only two African American war correspondents accepted, and became a nationally recognized journalist, in addition to being city editor of the Courier from 1956 until 1962.

In 1953, the Courier published sixteen regional editions, totaling 250,000 copies. This drop in circulation in just six years illustrates the Courier's decline. The Courier's decline can be attributed in large part to advances during the Civil Rights Movement, because as white publications included more African American news, circulation steadily fell. Also, the paper struggled without the financial expertise of the late Ira Lewis.

P.L. Prattis, a career journalist, rose from city editor in 1936, to managing editor in 1948, to executive editor of the Pittsburgh Courier in 1956. In 1947, Prattis was unanimously granted membership in the US Senate and House press galleries by the executive committee of the Periodical Correspondents Association. That year he was the first African American journalist permitted to enter the United States Congress via the Periodical Press Galleries of the United States Congress. He remained executive editor until 1965. In 1965, Prattis retired from the Courier after John H. Sengstacke purchased the ailing paper.

Some prominent contributors to the Courier were Joel Augustus Rogers, who worked as a journalist for the Courier in the 1920s, and Sam Milai, editorial cartoonist for the Courier for 33 years. The Courier was the first to spot the talent of a young William Gardner Smith, who was hired by the Courier while still in high school. This was in 1943, some years before he gained attention as an expatriate novelist and journalist living in France. Trezzvant Anderson covered the early years of the civil rights movement for the paper.

== Courier comic strips ==
The Pittsburgh Courier published comic strips, even syndicating some to other black newspapers. The first strip of note was Sunny Boy Sam, originally by Wilbert Holloway, which launched in 1928 and continued past the demise of the Courier. The Courier also published Your History, written by Joel Augustus Rogers and originally illustrated by George L. Lee. Patterned after the look of Robert Ripley's popular Believe It or Not cartoons, multiple vignettes in each cartoon episode recounted short items about African Americans from Rogers' research. Your History ran from November 10, 1934, to July 31, 1937. It returned in November 1940, illustrated by long-time Courier editorial cartoonist Sam Milai. In 1962 the strip was retitled Facts About The Negro, continuing for the rest of the Courier's run. Jackie Ormes' Torchy, which ran in the Courier from May 1, 1937, to April 30, 1938, was the first syndicated strip by a black woman.

Other notable strips published in the Courier included Jay Jackson's As Others See Us and Jackie Ormes' Patty-Jo 'n' Ginger (1945–1956).

From August 1950 to August 1954, the Courier partnered with the Smith-Mann Syndicate to publish a weekly color comics section called Carousel, featuring a line-up of strips aimed at an African American audience. These strips included:

- Chisholm Kid by Carl Pfeufer (August 19, 1950 – August 11, 1956) — also had a topper strip called Alan O'Dare from 1951 to 1954
- Don Powers by Sam Milai (August 19, 1950 – November 1, 1958)
- Funtime by Edo Anderson (1951–1954)
- Guy Fortune by Edd Ashe (August 19, 1950 – October 22, 1955)
- Kandy by A. C. Hollingsworth (1954–1955)
- Lohar by Bill Brady (1950–October 18, 1958)
- Mark Hunt by Michael Tam and/or Edd Ashe (c. 1950–October 22, 1955)
- Neil Knight of the Air by "Carl and Mac" (c. 1950–October 22, 1955)
- Sunny Boy Sam by Wilbert Holloway (c. 1950–c. 1958)
- Torchy in Heartbeats by Jackie Ormes (August 19, 1950 – September 18, 1954) — also had a paper doll topper strip called Torchy Togs
- Woody Woodenhead by Edo Anderson (August 19, 1950 – August 4, 1956)

Many of the strips continued on as daily, black-and-white strips after Carousel ceased.

== New Pittsburgh Courier ==
John H. Sengstacke, publisher of The Chicago Defender and a national figure for black newspapers, closed the Courier in 1966. He re-opened it in 1967 as the New Pittsburgh Courier.
