= Negro Society for Historical Research =

Society for Pan-African scholarly studies

The Negro Society for Historical Research (NSHR) is a Pan African scholarly organization founded by John Edward Bruce and Arthur Alfonso Schomburg in 1911. The purpose of the Negro Society for Historical Research was to collect a preserve African history on a global scale including African, African American, and Afro Latino. The Negro Society for Historical Research was founded to help descendants from Africa connect with their heritage.

== Background ==
The Negro Society for Historical Research was founded based the racial ideology that African American had no history and were no intellects. Bruce believed that their people's history did not begin on slave ships and there has to be more to the story. Bruce often was angered African Americans would succumb to white America and try to not confine their Negro Identity. Bruce wanted to eliminate that theory that all white people were the only ones to have achievements or contributions. Bruce believed that the Negro child often lack achievements was because there was a lack in intelligence which often created the lack of self-pride and resilience.

Schomburg also challenged this propaganda that Negros didn't have history not only to prove to himself but racial integration. Schomburg wanted a collection to help African descent restore parts of their history since most did not know or understand their history.This monument from Schomburg was to take back what slavery took, he used this as his lifelong philosophy to restore these items and shape his vision. Since they were both militant fighters, they believed that the Black community should have a voice for themselves but in order to have a voice you have to know your history.

To not be pushed under white supremacy and racism but to fight these oppositions with knowledge. Schomburg knew that knowledge was power because his knowledge opened doors for him to work with known voices in the community like W.E.B. DuBois, James Weldon Johnson, Carter G. Woodson, and more intellectual voices. Also, he was able to work in high offices for national organizational and he also became known as Sherlock Holmes of Negro History and/or the Black Bibliophile.

Schomburg worked hard to create this collection and with his hard work alongside Bruce they played a major role in preservation of African diaspora history which made scholars interested in learning history of African descent. Unlike the American Negro Academy (1897) that only collected history in the U.S. Bruce and Schomburg wanted to collect on a global scale because they knew that African history didn't start in America. Bruce and Schomburg originally met because of their Masonic involvement and began attending a Sunday Men's Club that met in Bruce's apartment.

Schomburg stated "We need a collection or list of books written by our own men and women.... We need the historian and philosopher to give us, with trenchant pen, the story of our forefathers and let our soul and body, with phosphorescent light, brighten the chasm that separates us." So, in 1911 in Bruce Yonkers home they formed the Negro Society for Historical Research.

Bruce and Schomburg each started collecting items such as books, pamphlets and newspapers to put into this organization. They collected items from Haiti, Jamaica, Latin America, and many more countries. They collected over 10,000 items from original newspapers from Frederick Douglass to poems by Phillis Wheatley.Bruce even managed to locate an 1859 copy of the Anglo African Magazine, an important Civil War Era New York City newspaper. Schomburg alone collected over 5,000 items including books, newspapers, and manuscripts all to build this society His research connected schools, colleges, and internationally with strengthened organizations around the world creating Black scholars globally. Schomburg and Bruce collection helped other historical activists and politicians understand their history as well and finish their historical landmark on society.

In 1926, the Negro Society of Historical Research was purchased for $10,000 by the Carnegie Corporation to a New York library and the collection later became the foundation for NYPL's Schomburg Collection of Negro Literature and Art which became the Schomburg Center for Research in Black Culture in Harlem.John Edward Bruce died in 1924 before the purchase happened, but he made a significant impact on the learning culture for African descent. Arthur A. Schomburg continued to build the collection after the purchase. Schomburg became a curator for Fisk's University Negro Collection in 1930. He was a curator for Fisk from 1931-1932 then later went back to being a curator for his own collection until his death in 1938.

== Affiliated members ==
For the Negro Society for Historical Research, they wanted black honorary and corresponding members for this society. Alain LeRoy Locke, W.E.B DuBois, King Lewanika, Majola Agbebi, and many others. Alain LeRoy Locke spoke at their first annual meeting and became a Corresponding Member for the society which partially sponsored his trip to Egypt in 1924. Although we have these members above a lot of members came from the founding organizations like the American Negro Academy and the National Afro American Council and many other Black founded organizations. The Negro Society for Historical Research was not for every Black person to join but the library was public for everyone, in NSHR there was no more than thirty members.

== Leadership organizations: John Edward Bruce ==
Loyal Order of the Sons of Africa- Bruce founded this organization in 1913, on the grounds of racial uplift and promoting unity. Bruce had a goal of freeing Africa from Colonialism and embracing the truth of darker skin. They unified to fight to have rights, opportunities, and justice.

Afro American Council (1898)/ Afro American League (1890)- These societies were created to advocate for civil rights. Bruce served as the speaker and writer in the Afro American League and as president in the Afro American Council. This followed Bruce ideology that Black people needed their own institutions which he later formed the Negro Society for Historical Research with Arthur A. Schomburg.

Hamitic League- Bruce joined this because of the founder George Wells who wrote The Children of the Sun that told that Africans were the first builders of civilization. Bruce contributed his own work the Crusader that told of his deep racial pride and told the concerns of the Pan African community.

== Leadership organizations: Arthur Alfonso Schomburg ==
Las Dos Antillas (The Two Islands)- Schomburg was a founding member and secretary of this political club. This club was founded to help Cuba and Puerto Rico get their independence from Spain. This organization sparked his interest in getting freedom for people of color globally.

El Sol de Cuba Lodge No.38 (Prince Hall Lodge)- This organization was founded by Cuban and Puerto Rican exiles, Schomburg was a member but later became master of the organization. This organization was to help exiled individuals with practicing their language, food and clothing, and homes.

American Negro Academy- Bruce and Schomburg were members of the ANA not the founder, Alexander Crummell was but they were best known for their militant writer that challenged racial ideology. The ANA sought to “foster black literature, scholarship, and the arts” to counter the materialism symbolized by industrial education- A. Crummell. Bruce and Crummell had pride in being Negros and sought to be the voice of the race.

Bruce and Schomburg also were writers, publishers, and editors for newspapers and articles that talk about racial pride, black struggles, and black history. They were not afraid to criticize others' work to defend their identity. They wanted others to defend their racial pride as well by spreading racial narratives and African history. These organizations and newspapers helped shaped Africans intellect, history, and civil rights activists and leaders to lead with cultural pride.

== See also ==
- Association for the Study of African American Life and History
