= Maria Varela =

American photographer and teacher

Maria Varela (born January 1940) is a Mexican-American civil rights photographer, community organizer, a writer, and a teacher. She has been actively involved in Civil Rights movements, advocating rights for indigenous communities and protects cultural heritage within African-American, Native-American, and Mexican-American in rural communities. She created and supported several non-profits organizations to help many minority groups, especially Native-American and Mexican-American. She won a MacArthur Fellowship in 1990 for her endeavor to help with the Native-American communities in northern New Mexico, southern Colorado, and northeastern Arizona to develop economic opportunities and preserve their human rights.

== Early life and education ==
Maria Varela was born in Pennsylvania and lived in many different places in her younger days, but spent most of her time in the upper Midwest. Raised Catholic by her Mexican father and Irish mother, she grew up in a rigorous Catholic environment. She went to the St. Louis Academy for Girls in Chicago, and then to Alverno College. In college, she joined the national Young Christian Students (YCS) program where she was given the position to travel the country to encourage young students to support Civil Rights Movements.

In 1963, Varela went deep in the south to support the Civil Rights Movements where she began working with the Student Nonviolent Coordinating Committee in Alabama and Mississippi. She later graduated from University of Massachusetts.

She married Lorenzo Zuniga Jr. She now lives in Albuquerque.

== Career ==
From a young age, Maria Varela has been actively involved in various civil rights movements and organizations, from the Young Christian Student (YCS) program to Latinx Student Nonviolent Coordinating Committee (SNCC), which sets a foundation for her later work in the Civil Rights movement and in helping Native-American and Mexican-American communities She helped organize rural development and find Tierra Wools co-op. She was also photographer for Black Star (photo agency) that works to include African-American representations for voters education, capturing critical moments in the Civil Rights Movement.

She was also a visiting professor at Colorado College, and was adjunct professor at University of New Mexico.

=== Civil rights movement ===
Since college, Maria Varela has been actively involved in the civil rights movement. She believed in what is called “the great leader” theory: in order to have a powerful social movement, the movement needs a powerful leader. She not only supported the people she believed to be great leaders in supporting the Civil rights movement, but she also functioned as a critical figure behind the camera to capture impactful moments in the Civil rights movement.

Varela recognized the urgent issue of how the images provided for voter education materials excluded African American community and lacked diversity in racial representation. Thus, her works focused on documenting the significant steps made by African American leaders and captured the progression and evolvement of the Civil Rights Movement.

=== Literacy works ===
Maria Varela's literacy work is one of the most under-recognized and under-studied literacies in the U.S. However, her multimodal works, collaboratively produced by Varela and the African American community, make the important argument about community activism, which is crucial and novel but seldom discussed. Her work plays a critical role in those communities developing a new ethos of place: an imagined and embodied relationship between local and national communities that offers a new identity and sense of participatory agency.

=== Rural communities ===
In 1968, Maria Varela was invited to start agricultural cooperatives and a community health clinic in northern New Mexico. New Mexico. Since then, she has been working with indigenous leaders to help them develop economic opportunities and protect cultural heritage within African-American, Native-American, and Mexican-American rural communities. Varela co-founded Ganados del Valle in 1981, a nonprofit, economic development corporation that primarily helps Latinos and Native-American communities in northern New Mexico, southern Colorado, and northeastern Arizona to preserve their pastoral cultures, lands, and water rights. She helped created a wool-growers cooperative that included a weaving and spinning enterprise, training in small business development, and cultural reaffirmation. She spent years trying to create and enable nonprofit organizations and viable enterprises to build upon and add to existing local resources, and was awarded with an MacArthur Award in 1990.

== More works ==
- Frederic O. Sargent; Paul Lusk; Jose Rivera; Maria Varela (October 1, 1991). Rural Environmental Planning for Sustainable Communities. Island Press. pp. 12–. ISBN 978-1-61091-319-5.
- Maria Varela (9 August 2019). “Time to Get Ready,” Hands on the Freedom Plow: Personal Accounts by Women in SNCC. Urbana: University of Illinois Press. pp. 552–572.
- Maria Varela (21 October 2021). Video of Photo Exhibit: RESISTANCE THROUGH MY LEN. Toward Common Causehttps.https://towardcommoncause.org/calendar/macarturos-platicas/
