= Joel Augustus Rogers =

Jamaican-American historian (1880–1966)

- Born: September 6, 1880; Negril, Jamaica
- Died: March 26, 1966 (aged 85); New York City, U.S.
- Occupations: Author, historian
- Spouse: Helga M. Rogers

Joel Augustus Rogers (September 6, 1880 – March 26, 1966) was a Jamaican-American author, journalist, and professional historian who focused on the history of Africa as well as the African diaspora. After settling in the United States in 1906, he lived in Chicago and then New York City. He became interested in the history of African Americans in the United States. His research spanned the academic fields of history, sociology and anthropology. He challenged prevailing ideas about scientific racism and the social construction of race, demonstrated the connections between civilizations and traced achievements of African people, including some with mixed European ancestry. He was one of the earliest popularizers of African and African-American history in the 20th century. His book World's Great Men of Color was recognized by John Henrik Clarke as being his greatest achievement.

== Biography ==
Joel Augustus Rogers was born September 6, 1880, in Negril, Jamaica. One of eleven children, he was the son of mixed-race parents who were a minister and schoolteacher. His parents could afford to give Rogers and his ten siblings only a rudimentary education, but stressed the importance of learning. Rogers claimed to have had a "good basic education".

Rogers emigrated from Jamaica to the United States in 1906, living in Chicago until 1921 and then settling in Harlem, New York. He became a naturalized citizen in 1916 and lived in New York most of his life. He was there during the Harlem Renaissance, a flowering of African-American artistic and intellectual life in numerous fields. He became a close personal friend of Hubert Harrison, an intellectual and activist based in Harlem.

While living in Chicago in the 1920s, Rogers worked as a Pullman porter and as a reporter for the Chicago Enterprise (a paper later renamed The Chicago World). His job of Pullman porter allowed him to travel and observe a wide range of people. Through this travel he was able to use various libraries in the cities which he visited. He self-published the results of his research in several books.

=== From "Superman" to Man ===
From Superman to Man (1917)

Rogers' first book From "Superman" to Man, self-published in 1917, attacked notions of African inferiority. From "Superman" to Man is a polemic against the ignorance that fuels racism. The central plot revolves around a debate between a Pullman porter and a white racist Southern politician. Rogers used this debate to air many of his personal philosophies and to debunk stereotypes about black people and white racial superiority. The porter's arguments and theories are pulled from classical and contemporary sources, from history and anthropology to biology. Rogers addresses issues such as the lack of scientific support for the idea of race, the lack of black history told from black people's perspectives and the fact of intermarriage and unions among peoples throughout history.

The book reveals Rogers' position on Christianity. When the second main character, the Senator, asks: "Then you do not advocate Christianity for the Negro?" The main character Dixon then answers, "The real Christianity, yes. The usual Christianity of the white Gentile with its egotism and self-interest, no." When questioned about "Mohammedism" by the Senator, Dixon responds positively about Islam.

=== Newspaper career ===
In the 1920s, Rogers worked as a journalist for the Pittsburgh Courier and the Chicago Enterprise. He was a sub-editor of Marcus Garvey's short-lived Daily Negro Times. As a newspaper correspondent, Rogers covered such events as the coronation of Emperor Haile Selassie I of Ethiopia for the New York Amsterdam News. He wrote for a variety of other black newspapers and journals: The Crisis, The American Mercury, The Messenger, the Negro World and Survey Graphic. One of his interviews was with Marcus Garvey in prison (New York Amsterdam News, November 17, 1926).

Rogers has been cited as the first black US war correspondent, reporting during World War II.

Rogers also contributed to a syndicated newspaper cartoon feature entitled Your History. Patterned after Robert Ripley's popular Believe It or Not cartoons, multiple vignettes in each cartoon episode recounted short items about African Americans from Rogers' research. The feature began in the Pittsburgh Courier in November 1934, with art by George L. Lee. In 1940, the art was handed over to Sam Milai, who stayed with the feature through the rest of its run. In 1962, the title was changed to Facts About The Negro. The feature outlived its author, and continued appearing regularly until 1971, presumably in reprints at the end of the run. Two collections were published, Your History (1940) and Facts About The Negro (c. 1960).

=== Other works ===
Rogers' work was concerned with "the Great Black Man" theory of history. This theory presented history, specifically black history, as a mural of achievements by prominent black people. He devoted a significant amount of his professional life to unearthing facts about people of African ancestry, intending these findings to be a refutation of contemporary racist beliefs about the inferiority of black people. Books such as 100 Amazing Facts about the Negro, Sex and Race and World's Great Men of Color describe remarkable black people throughout the ages and cite significant achievements of black people. He asserted that several historical figures previously classified or assumed to be white, including Aesop, Cleopatra and Hannibal, were black. This was decades before research by later Afrocentric historians (which was rejected by specialist consensus) tried to support some of his work.

Rogers commented on the partial black ancestry of some prominent Europeans, including Alexander Pushkin and Alexandre Dumas. Similarly, Rogers claimed that several portraits of Charlotte of Mecklenburg-Strelitz, a direct ancestor of the British royal family, depicting her with "broad nostrils and heavy lips" indicated a "Negroid strain." Although popular among the general public, these claims are largely denounced by most scholars.

Rogers' theories about race, sex and color can be found in his books Nature Knows No Color-Line and World's Great Men of Color. His pamphlet Five Negro Presidents provided what he called evidence that some 19th- and 20th-century presidents of the United States had partially black ancestry. His research in this book inspired Auset Bakhufu's book Six Black Presidents: Black Blood: White Masks USA (1993). Neither of these has gained consensus. Scholar Henry Louis Gates Jr. said that Rogers' pamphlet would "get the 'Black History Wishful Thinking Prize,'" if one existed.

Rogers surmised that ethnic differences arose from sociological factors. He believed that such differences between groups were often attributed primarily to "physical" differences such as race. He deals with the themes of race and sex in Sex and Race and also in Nature Knows No Color-Line. Rogers' research in these works examined migration and movement of populations, and evidence for intermarriage and interracial unions throughout human history. He contended that it resulted in a black "strain" in Europe and the Americas.

In Nature Knows No Color-Line, Rogers examined the origins of racial hierarchy and the color problem. He stated that the origins of the race problem had never been adequately examined or discussed. He believed that color prejudice generally evolved from issues of domination and power between two physiologically different groups. He thought that color prejudice was used as a rationale for domination, subjugation and warfare. Societies developed myths and prejudices in order to pursue their own interests at the expense of other groups. He was trying to show that there is nothing innate about color prejudice, that there is no natural distaste for darker skin by lighter-skinned people and that there is no natural aversion for lighter skin by darker-skinned people.

Sex and Race describes Rogers' theory regarding the origin of the races themselves, claiming that original humans were light-skinned, though similar to black Africans. One strain became the modern "white" race, the other in Africa becoming black Africans. All other races are their descendants to greater or lesser degrees. None is regarded as superior to any other.

Within these works, Rogers questioned the concept of race, the origins of racial differentiation and the root of the "color problem". Rogers felt that the "color problem" was that race was used as social, political and economic determining factors.

=== Death ===
Rogers died on March 26, 1966, in New York City. He was survived by his wife, Helga M. Rogers.

== Philosophy and viewpoint ==
Rogers was a meticulous researcher and traveled extensively. While traveling in Europe, he frequented libraries, museums and castles, finding sources that helped him document African ancestry and history. He challenged the biased viewpoint of Eurocentric historians and anthropologists.

Rogers gathered what he called "the bran of history". The bran of history was the uncollected, unexamined history of the world, and his interest was the history of black people. Rogers intended that the neglected parts of history would become part of the mainstream body of Western history. He saw African inclusion in world historical discourses as helping to bridge racial divides. His scholarship was meant to shed light on hitherto unexamined areas of African history, as well as combat the stereotypes of inferiority that were attributed to black people.

Rogers challenged that the color of skin did not determine intellectual genius, and that Africans had contributed more to the world than was previously acknowledged. He publicized the great black civilizations that had flourished in Africa during antiquity. He devoted his scholarship to vindicating a place for African people within Western history. According to Rogers, many ancient African civilizations had been primal molders of Western civilization and culture.

With these discoveries, Rogers was also highlighting the absurdity of racial divisions. His belief in one race – humanity – precluded the idea of several different ethnic races. In this, he was a humanist. He used history as a tool to bolster his ideas about humanism, and his scholarship to prove his underlying humanistic thesis: that people were one large family without racial boundaries.

Rogers was self-financed, self-educated, and self-published. Some critics have focused on his lack of a formal education as a hindrance to producing scholarly work; others suggested the fact that he was self-taught liberated him from many academic and methodological restrictions. As an autodidact, Rogers followed his research into various disciplines that more formally educated scholars may have been loath to attempt. His works are complete with detailed references. That he documented his work to encourage scrutiny of his facts was a testament to his due diligence, work ethic and commitment to the world's history and culture.

Rogers articulated ideas about race that were informed by anthropology and biology, rather than social convention. He used what he discovered in his research as a tool to express his humanist beliefs, and to illustrate the unity of humanity. He discarded the non-scientific definition of race and pursued his own ideas about humanity's inter-connectedness. While his work has often been classified as Afrocentric and outside mainstream history, his main contribution to academia was his nuanced analysis of the concept of race.

== Legacy and honors ==
Rogers was a member of professional associations including the Paris Society of Anthropology, the American Geographical Society, the American Association for the Advancement of Science and the Academy of Political Science.

== Works ==
- From "Superman" to Man. Chicago: J. A. Rogers, 1917.
- As Nature Leads: An Informal Discussion of the Reason Why Negro and Caucasian are Mixing in Spite of Opposition. Chicago: M. A. Donahue & Co, 1919.
- The Approaching Storm and How it May be Averted: An Open Letter to Congress. Chicago: National Equal Rights League, Chicago Branch: 1920.
- "Music and Poetry — The Noblest Arts," Music and Poetry, vol. 1, no. 1 (January 1921).
- "The Thrilling Story of The Maroons," serialized in The Negro World (March–April 1922).
- "The West Indies: Their Political, Social, and Economic Condition," serialized in The Messenger, vol. 4, no. 9 (September 1922).
- Blood Money, serialized in New York Amsterdam News (April 1923).
- "The Ku Klux Klan A Menace or A Promise," serialized in The Messenger, vol. 5, no. 3 (March 1923).
- "Jazz at Home", The Survey Graphic Harlem, vol. 6, no. 6 (March 1925).
- "What Are We, Negroes or Americans?" The Messenger, vol. 8, no. 8 (August 1926).
- "Book Review, 'Jazz', by Paul Whiteman." Opportunity: A Journal of Negro Life, vol. 4, no. 48 (December 1926).
- "The Negro's Experience of Christianity and Islam," Review of Nations (January–March 1928).
- "The American Occupation of Haiti: Its Moral and Economic Benefit," by Dantès Bellegarde (translator). Opportunity, vol. 8, no. 1 (January 1930).
- "The Negro in Europe," The American Mercury (May 1930).
- "The Negro in European History," Opportunity, vol. 8, no. 6 (June 1930).
- World's Greatest Men of African Descent. New York: J. A. Rogers Publications, 1931.
- "The Americans in Ethiopia," under the pseudonym Jerrold Robbins, in American Mercury (May 1933).
- "Enrique Diaz," in Opportunity, vol. 11, no. 6 (June 1933).
- 100 Amazing Facts about the Negro with Complete Proof. A Short Cut to the World History of the Negro. New York: J. A. Rogers Publications, 1934.
- World's Greatest Men and Women of African Descent. New York: J. A. Rogers Publications, 1935.
- "Italy Over Abyssinia," The Crisis, vol. 42, no. 2 (February 1935).
- The Real Facts About Ethiopia. New York: J. A Rogers, 1936.
- "When I Was In Europe," Interracial Review: A Journal for Christian Democracy (October 1938).
- "Hitler and the Negro," Interracial Review: A Journal for Christian Democracy (April 1940).
- "The Suppression of Negro History," The Crisis, vol. 47, no. 5 (May 1940).
- Your History: From the Beginning of Time to the Present. Pittsburgh Courier Publishing Co., 1940.
- An Appeal From Pioneer Negroes of the World, Inc: An Open Letter to His Holiness Pope Pius XII. New York: J. A. Rogers, 1940.
- Sex and Race: Negro-Caucasian Mixing in All Ages and All Lands, Volume I: The Old World. New York: J. A. Rogers, 1940.
- Sex and Race: A History of White, Negro, and Indian Miscegenation in the Two Americas, Volume II: The New World. New York: J. A. Rogers, 1942.
- Sex and Race, Volume III: Why White and Black Mix in Spite of Opposition. New York: J. A. Rogers, 1944.
- World's Great Men of Color, Volume I: Asia and Africa, and Historical Figures Before Christ, Including Aesop, Hannibal, Cleopatra, Zenobia, Askia the Great, and Many Others. New York: J. A. Rogers, 1946.
- World's Great Men of Color, Volume II: Europe, South and Central America, the West Indies, and the United States, Including Alessandro de' Medici, Alexandre Dumas, Dom Pedro II, Marcus Garvey, and Many Others. New York: J. A. Rogers, 1947.
- "Jim Crow Hunt," The Crisis (November 1951).
- Nature Knows No Color Line: Research into the Negro Ancestry in the White Race. New York: J. A. Rogers, 1952.
- Facts About the Negro (illustrations by Sam Milai). Pittsburgh: Lincoln Park Studios, 1960.
- Africa's Gift to America: The Afro-American in the Making and Saving of the United States. With New Supplement Africa and its Potentialities, New York: J. A. Rogers, 1961.
- She Walks in Beauty. Los Angeles: Western Publishers, 1963.
- "Civil War Centennial: Myth and Reality", Freedomways, vol. 3, no. 1 (Winter 1963).
- The Five Negro Presidents: According to What White People Said They Were. New York: J. A. Rogers, 1965.

== See also ==
- Arturo Alfonso Schomburg
- George Schuyler
- First Italo-Ethiopian War
