= Sam Milai =

American cartoonist

- Born: Ahmed Samuel Milai; March 23, 1908
- Died: April 30, 1970 (aged 62)
- Areas: Editorial cartoonist, comic strip cartoonist
- Notable works: Your History/ Facts About The Negro, Don Powers

Ahmed Samuel Milai (March 23, 1908 – April 30, 1970), better known as Sam Milai, was an African American editorial and comic strip cartoonist who drew for the Pittsburgh Courier.

From 1940–c. 1971, Milai illustrated Your History (later known as Facts About The Negro), written by Joel Augustus Rogers. Patterned after the look of Robert Ripley's popular Believe It or Not cartoons, multiple vignettes in each cartoon episode recounted short items about African Americans from Rogers' research. The feature began in the Pittsburgh Courier in November 1934, with art by George L. Lee. In 1940, the art chores were handed over to Milai, who stayed with the feature through the rest of its run. Two collections were published, Your History (1940) and Facts About The Negro (c. 1960).

Milai created Don Powers, an adventure strip distributed from August 19, 1950, to November 1, 1958, by the Smith-Mann Syndicate, about a superlative athlete. In addition, he created the strips Bucky (under his own name) and Society Sue (under the name Bobby Thomas).

Milai's 1960s political cartoons for the Pittsburgh Courier are curated at Ohio State University's Billy Ireland Cartoon Library & Museum.

Milai was the Courier's editorial cartoonist for 33 years.
