= Negro World =

Defunct American newspaper

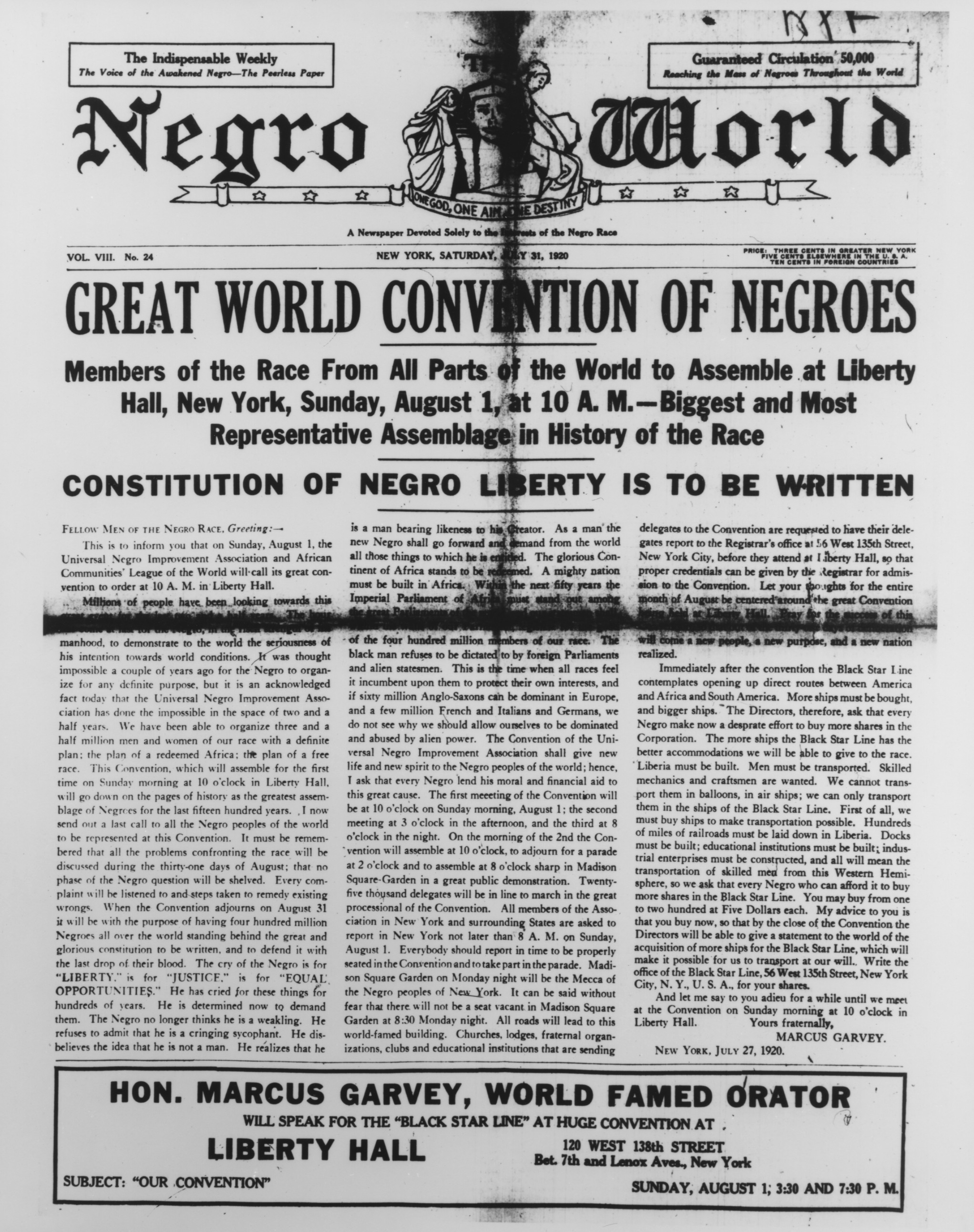
Cover of Negro World, July 31, 1920

Negro World was the newspaper of Marcus Garvey's Universal Negro Improvement Association and African Communities League (UNIA). Founded by Garvey and Amy Ashwood Garvey in July 1914 and operating until 1933, the newspaper was published weekly in Harlem, and distributed internationally to the UNIA's chapters in more than forty countries. Distributed weekly, at its peak, the Negro World reached a circulation of 200,000.

Notable editors included Marcus Garvey, T. Thomas Fortune, William H. Ferris, W.A. Domingo and Amy Jacques Garvey.

== Background ==
Garvey founded the UNIA in July 1914, and within the organization's first few years had started publishing Negro World.

Monthly, Negro World distributed more copies than The Messenger, The Crisis and Opportunity (other important African-American publications). Colonial rulers banned its sales and even possession in their territories, including both British Empire and French colonial empire possessions. Distribution in foreign countries was conducted through black seamen who would smuggle the paper into such areas.

Negro World ceased publication in 1933.

== Content ==
For a nickel, readers received a front-page editorial by Garvey, along with poetry and articles of international interest to people of African ancestry. Under the editorship of Amy Jacques Garvey the paper featured a full page called "Our Women and What They Think".

Negro World also played an important part in the Harlem Renaissance of the 1920s. The paper was a focal point for publication on the arts and African-American culture, including poetry, commentary on theatre and music, and regular book reviews. Romeo Lionel Dougherty, a prominent figure of the Jazz Age, began writing for Negro World in 1922.

== Contributors ==
Notable editors and contributors to Negro World included:

- Duse Mohamed Ali
- John Edward Bruce
- Wilfred Adolphus Domingo
- William Henry Ferris
- Timothy Thomas Fortune
- William Henderson Franklin
- Amy Ashwood Garvey
- Amy Jacques Garvey
- Hubert Henry Harrison
- Samuel Alfred Haynes
- Zora Neale Hurston
- John G. Jackson
- Robert Lincoln Poston
- Andy Razaf
- Joel Augustus Rogers
- Arthur Schomburg
- William Alexander Stephenson
- Eric Walrond
- Carter Godwin Woodson
