= Assault of Sureshbhai Patel =

2015 U.S. police officer assault of Indian national

- Date: February 6, 2015
- Time: 9 a.m.
- Location: Madison, Alabama, United States
- Filmed by: Two police car dashboard cameras
- Participants: Sureshbhai Patel (injured); Eric Parker (assailant); Unknown caller (who called 911)
- Injuries: 1
- Suspects: Eric Parker
- Charges: Third-degree assault Federal charge of civil rights abuse
- Convictions: Mistrial on civil rights violations
- Litigation: Federal lawsuit asking for unspecified amount

On February 6, 2015, three police officers assaulted, detained, and seriously injured Sureshbhai Patel, a 57-year-old Indian national, in a residential neighborhood in Madison, Alabama, U.S. A neighborhood resident called the police on Patel, who was visiting his son and spoke no English, for alleged suspicious behavior in the neighborhood. Video footage from two police car dashboard cameras shows the officer slamming Patel to the ground. He was hospitalized and is partially paralyzed from his injuries. The incident led many citizens to accuse Madison Police Department of police brutality and prompted a response from the Indian government.

Police officer Eric Parker, accused of injuring Patel, was fired from the Madison Police Department and charged with third-degree assault. In March 2015, the FBI charged Parker with felony civil rights abuse, but he was later acquitted of all charges. Parker was reinstated into the force in 2016.

== Backgrounds ==
=== Sureshbhai Patel ===
Sureshbhai Patel is from Gujarat, India. He arrived in Madison a week before the incident to visit his son Chirag, who works as an engineer there, and to help take care of his 17-month-old grandson with his daughter-in-law. Patel speaks Gujarati and Hindi but not English.

=== Eric Parker ===
Eric Sloan Parker was 26 years old at the time of the incident and worked for the Madison Police Department from 2013 to 2015. He speaks English but understands neither Gujarati nor Hindi.

== Incident ==
At 9 a.m., Patel was taking a stroll outside his son's house. A man in the neighborhood called 911 to report a suspicious man lurking about and peering into garages. He described Patel as a "skinny black man wearing a toboggan [sic]." A few minutes later, two police officers approached Patel on a sidewalk. Parker asked Patel for his identification. Patel said repeatedly that he did not know English and was from India. The video appears to show Parker throwing Patel to the ground face first ninety seconds into the encounter. His hands also appeared to be behind his back as he was pushed. Patel's family allege that Parker also twisted Patel's arm.

== Injuries ==
Patel was hospitalized at Huntsville Hospital and Madison Hospital for spinal swelling and underwent surgery for his vertebrae. He is partially paralyzed. He was treated at the Healthsouth Rehabilitation Center in Huntsville, where he had to relearn how to walk.

Donors raised over $209,000 for Patel from a GoFundMe fundraiser to help pay for his medical bills.

== Legal proceedings ==
One week after the incident, Parker was charged with third-degree assault, a misdemeanor punishable with a maximum of one year in jail and a $6,000 fine. He turned himself in to the Limestone County Jail on February 12 and posted $1,000 bond.

On March 26, he was indicted by a federal grand jury. Parker was charged by the Federal Bureau of Investigation (FBI) with deprivation of rights under the color of law, a felony that carries a maximum of ten years in prison. According to U.S. Attorney Joyce White Vance, the violation includes the constitutional right to be free from "unreasonable force."

In April, Parker pleaded not guilty to the federal charge at the federal courthouse in Huntsville, and was released on $5,000 bond. His trial for the federal charge was set for June 1, 2015, while the state charge trial was set for May 13, 2015. On September 11, 2015, a jury failed to reach a verdict for the federal civil rights violations charge. Federal prosecutors planned to retry Parker.

On January 13, 2016, U.S. District Judge Madeline Haikala granted an acquittal motion by the Alabama cops' attorneys, ending the federal civil trial for Parker permanently. The prosecution filed a counter motion to not acquit Parker, but the judge dismissed the prosecution's motion, siding with the defense instead, and said that the victim committed a misdemeanor by leaving the house without identification.

The first federal case for civil rights violations against Parker ended in a mistrial when ten non-Black male jurors voted to acquit him while two Black female jurors voted to convict. The second and last federal case against Parker also ended in a mistrial, and a federal judge from Alabama dismissed the charges against Parker to prevent a third federal trial. The misdemeanor assault charge against Parker was dismissed in July 2016.

== Lawsuit ==
On February 12, Patel and his lawyer, Hank Sherrod, filed a federal lawsuit against Madison police for use of excessive force and racial profiling.

On May 27, 2020 the U.S. Court of Appeals 11th Circuit ruled that a civil rights lawsuit filed against Parker and the city of Madison can move forward.

In April 2021, Patel settled the lawsuit for $1.75 million.

== Reactions ==
=== U.S. reactions ===
Ami Bera, an Indian American congressman and co-chairman of the Congressional Caucus on India, described the incident as "horrible and tragic." Members of the Asian Pacific American Caucus, including Michael Honda and Judy Chu, have condemned the treatment of Patel and claimed that it was excessive force and an example of "contempt of cop".

=== Response from Indian government ===
Syed Akbaruddin, a former spokesman for the Ministry of External Affairs of India, said that the Indian government was disturbed by the treatment of Mr. Patel and was taking the incident "very seriously." He stated that India's officials planned to contact the U.S. mission in New Delhi and officials in Washington, D.C. and Alabama.

== Return to work ==
Parker was subsequently allowed to return to work at the Madison Police Department and cleared of any policy violation of the department. He was required to undergo re-certification. As of 2025, he resides in Alabaster, Alabama and is now a sergeant at the Vestavia Hills Police Department.
