= John Edward Bruce =

American journalist (1856–1924)

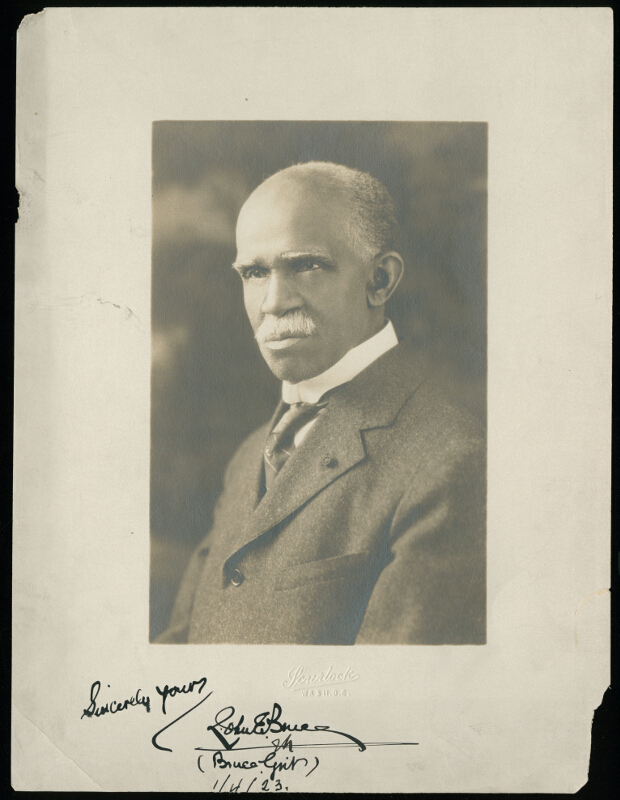
- Born: February 22, 1856; Piscataway, Maryland, US
- Died: August 7, 1924 (aged 68); New York City, US
- Resting place: Oakland Cemetery in Yonkers
- Education: Howard University
- Occupations: Journalist, historian, writer, orator, civil rights activist
- Spouse: Florence A. Bishop
- Writing career
- Pen name: Bruce Grit

John Edward Bruce, also known as Bruce Grit or J. E. Bruce-Grit (February 22, 1856 – August 7, 1924), was an American journalist, historian, writer, orator, civil rights activist and Pan-African nationalist. He was born a slave in Maryland; as an adult, he founded numerous newspapers along the East Coast, as well as co-founding (with Arthur Alfonso Schomburg) the Negro Society for Historical Research in New York.

== Early life and education ==
Bruce was born in 1856 in Piscataway, Maryland, to enslaved parents Robert and Martha Allen (Clark) Bruce. When he was three years old, his father was sold to a slaveholder in Georgia and Bruce never saw or heard from him again. He and his mother fled to Washington, D.C. and later to Connecticut, where Bruce enrolled in an integrated school and received his first formal education. Traveling back to Washington later, he received a private education and attended Howard University for a three-month course. After that, he never pursued formal education again, and was mostly self-taught.

In 1874, at the age of 18, Bruce earned a job as a messenger for the associate editor of the New York Times' Washington office. His duties included getting information for the next day's paper from Senator Charles Sumner, a Republican who supported civil rights for African-Americans.

== Career ==
In Washington, DC, in 1879, Bruce and Charles N. Otley founded the Argus Weekly newspaper. They decided that the paper would "be a fearless advocate of the true principles of the Republican Party, and the moral and intellectual advancement of the Negro American." It was a time of flourishing projects in the black community.

Next, Bruce founded the Sunday Item in 1880, and the Republican in 1882, both in Norfolk, Virginia. He served as the associate editor and business manager of the Baltimore, Maryland, Commonwealth in 1884.

Later that year, he returned to Washington, D.C. to establish the Grit. He earned income as a paid contributor to The Boston Transcript, The Albany Argus, Buffalo Express, Sunday Gazette, and Sunday Republic of Washington under his pen name of "Bruce Grit".

Bruce also became prominent on the lecture circuit, giving speeches that addressed lynching, the condition of southern blacks, and the weak American political system that failed to protect the rights of its black citizens. In 1890, he joined activist T. Thomas Fortune's Afro-American League, the first organized black civil rights group in the nation. He became the organization's new president in 1898 when it reformed as the Afro-American Council.

Bruce was a member of the literary bureau of the Republican National Committee in 1900.

By 1908, he had followed the Great Migration to New York. There, in 1908, he established the Yonkers, New York, Weekly Standard. Beginning in 1910, he served as American Correspondent for the African Times and Orient Review of London, England, edited by Dusé Mohamed Ali. In Yonkers, he also worked as a probation officer in 1910.

== Position on armed self-defense ==
During the American Reconstruction era and after, many black leaders espoused non-violent strategies for social change. Appalled at the rise of lynchings and imposition of legal segregation, Bruce supported armed self-defense against racist attacks. He is quoted as saying: "The Man who will not fight for the protection of his wife and children...is a coward and deserves to be ill treated. The man who takes his life in his hand and stands up for what he knows to be right will always command the respect of his enemy." He supported "organized resistance to organized resistance."

== Later career ==
In Harlem and Yonkers, Bruce became involved with the emerging community of intellectuals, including newly arrived immigrants from the Caribbean. In 1911, with Arthur Schomburg from Puerto Rico, he founded the Negro Society for Historical Research, first based in Yonkers, to create an institute to support scholarly efforts. For the first time it brought together African, West Indian and Afro-American scholars. This later became the foundation for the Schomburg Center for Research in Black Culture, New York Public Library, on Lenox Avenue in Harlem.

Bruce also was a mentor to Hubert Henry Harrison, the young migrant from St. Croix who became influential in black socialism and black nationalism.

Bruce's belief in an independent national destiny for blacks in the United States led him in the period around 1919 to embrace Jamaican Marcus Garvey's Pan-African nationalism. As a member of Garvey's Universal Negro Improvement Association (UNIA), Bruce wrote for the movement's Negro World and the Daily Negro Times.

Despite his productivity, Bruce found that to sustain himself he had for most of his adult life to work for the Port of New York Authority. After he retired in 1922, he received a small pension until his death in New York City's Bellevue Hospital two years later.

Bruce was given an impressive state funeral at the UNIA Liberty Hall in New York City on August 10, 1924, and was buried in Oakland Cemetery in Yonkers. More than 5,000 people attended three services conducted that day honoring him.

Bruce was a Prince Hall Mason, member of the Humane Order of African Redemption and the African Society of London, now the Royal African Society.

== Marriage and family ==
Bruce married Florence A. Bishop of Cleveland, Ohio, on September 10, 1885, in Washington, DC.

== Partial bibliography ==
- The Blot of the Scutcheon
- Bruce Grit: The Black Nationalist Writings of John Edward Bruce, Seraile, William (2002) ISBN 1-57233-210-7
- The Nation, the Law, the Citizen: Their Relation Each to the Other;
- The Awakening of Hezekiah Jones: A Story Dealing With Some Of The Problems Affecting The Political Rewards Due The Negro, 1916. ISBN 0-548-59036-2; ISBN 978-0-548-59036-2. Full Text.
- No Heaven for the Black Man
- The Black Sleuth, 2002 (first published in serial form in 1907–09)
- Prince Hall, the Pioneer of Negro Masonry. Proofs of the Legitimacy of Prince Hall Masonry. New York: Hunt Printing Company, 1921.
- The Selected Writings of John Edward Bruce: Militant Black Journalist, Gilbert, Peter (ed.), 1971.
- Prince Hall, the Pioneer of Negro Masonry. Proofs of the Legitimacy of Prince Hall Masonry. New York: Hunt Printing Company, 1921.
- A Tribute for the Negro Soldier. 1918.
- The Making of a Race. 1922.
- Was Othello a Negro? 1920.
