= Chancellor Williams =

American historian (1893–1992)

- Born: Chancellor James Williams; December 22, 1893; Bennettsville, South Carolina, U.S.
- Died: December 7, 1992 (aged 98); Providence Hospital in Washington, D.C., U.S.
- Occupations: Writer, historian, sociologist
- Writing career
- Pen name: James Williams
- Subject: Egyptology
- Notable work: The Destruction of Black Civilization

Chancellor Williams (December 22, 1893 – December 7, 1992) was an American sociologist, historian and writer. He is known for his work on African civilizations prior to encounters with Europeans; his most notable work is The Destruction of Black Civilization (1971/1974), which is popular in Afrocentric circles.

== Early life, migration, and education ==
Williams was born on December 22, 1893, in Bennettsville, South Carolina, United States, as the last of five children. His father had been born into slavery and had grown up to gain freedom and voting rights after the American Civil War. His mother, Dorothy Ann Williams, worked as a cook, nurse, and evangelist. The family suffered after Democrats regained power in the state legislature in the late 19th century and passed bills disfranchising black citizens, as well as imposing racial segregation and white supremacy under Jim Crow. Williams' curiosity about racial inequality and cultural struggles, particularly those of African Americans, began as early as his fifth-grade year. Encouraged by a sixth-grade teacher, he sold The Crisis, published by the National Association for the Advancement of Colored People (NAACP); and The Norfolk Journal and Guide, as well as reading them and using their recommended books to direct his studies.

Years later, he was quoted in an interview as saying:

I was very sensitive about the position of black people in the town... I wanted to know how you explain this great difference. How is it that we were in such low circumstances as compared to the whites? And when they answered 'slavery' as the explanation, then I wanted to know where we came from.

As part of the Great Migration out of the rural South, the Williams family moved to Washington, DC, in 1910. His father hoped for more opportunity there, especially in education, and Williams graduated from Armstrong Technical High School. Williams' mother died in 1925, leaving his father a widower. All their children were grown by then.

After working for a while, Williams entered college at Howard University, a historically black college. He earned an undergraduate degree in education in 1930, followed by a master's degree in history in 1935. After completing a doctoral dissertation on the socioeconomic significance of the storefront church movement in the United States since 1920, he was awarded a Ph.D. in sociology by American University in 1949.

== Career ==
In 1935, Williams started as Administrative Principal for the Cheltenham School for Boys in Maryland. Four years later, he became a teacher in the Washington, DC, public schools. With World War II imminent, he entered the civil service system in the Federal government in 1941, serving as section chief of the Census Bureau, a statistician for War Relocation Board, and an economist in Office of Price Administration.

== The Destruction of Black Civilization ==
In 1971/1974, Williams published his major work, The Destruction of Black Civilization: Great Issues of a Race Between 4500 B.C. and 2000 A.D.. The following year, the book received an award from the Black Academy of Arts and Letters (BAAL), founded in New York in 1969. Williams asserted the validity of the Black Egyptian hypothesis and that Ancient Egypt was predominantly a black civilization. Williams' central thesis is that Egypt, particularly Upper Egypt constituted the Northern boundary of a larger Ethiopian empire rooted in Napata and Kerma. Further, Williams asserts the king Narmer unifies Upper and Lower Egypt by compelling political unity among 'Asiatics' then resident in the Nile Delta. He further asserts in Chapter III, Egypt: The Rise and Fall of Black Civilization, that the name "Egyptian" becomes a referent to the children of Africans and Asians who reside throughout the country, rather than to either Africans or Asiatics residing at the respective ends of the Nile Valley and beyond (p. 103). (Note: Scholars have criticized the notion that traditional, racial categories can be applied to Ancient Egypt, maintaining that, despite the phenotypic diversity of Ancient and present-day Egyptians, applying modern notions of black or white races to ancient Egypt is anachronistic. In addition, scholars reject the notion, implicit in the notion of a black or white Egypt hypothesis, that Ancient Egypt was racially homogeneous; instead, skin color varied between the peoples of Lower Egypt, Upper Egypt, and Nubia, who in various eras rose to power in Ancient Egypt. Within Egyptian history, despite multiple foreign invasions, the demographics were not shifted substantially by large migrations. Even so, various scholars have argued that the origins of the Egyptian civilization derived from communities which emerged in both the Saharan and Sudanese regions of the Nile Valley.)

== Death ==
Williams died of respiratory failure on December 7, 1992, aged 98, at Providence Hospital in Washington, DC. He had been a resident of the Washington Center for Aging Services for several years. He was survived by his wife of 65 years, Mattie Williams of Washington, and 14 children; 36 grandchildren; 38 great-grandchildren; and 10 great-great-grandchildren.

== Books ==
- The Raven: A Novel of Edgar Allan Poe (1943)
- And If I Were White, Shaw Publications (1946)
- Have You Been to the River?, Exposition Press (1952)
- Problems in African History, Pencraft Books (1964)
- The Rebirth of African Civilization (1961); revised edition, introduction by Baba Zulu, United Brothers and Sisters Communications Systems (reprint 1993), ISBN 0-88378-129-8
- The Destruction of Black Civilization: Great Issues of a Race Between 4500 B.C. and 2000 A.D. (1971/1974/1987), ISBN 0-88378-030-5, scanned version online
- The Second Agreement with Hell Carlton Press (1979)

== Legacy and honors ==
- 1972: award from Black Academy of Arts and Letters

== See also ==
- Ancient Egyptian race controversy
