= African-American socialism =

Political ideology formed amongst African Americans

African-American socialism is a political current that emerged in the nineteenth century, specifically referring to the origins and proliferation of Marxist ideologies among African-Americans for whom socialism represents a potential for equal class status, humane treatment as laborers, and a means of dismantling American capitalism. Black liberation is in line with Marxist theory, which asserts that the working class, regardless of race, has a common interest against the bourgeoisie.

== History ==
African Americans have made significant contributions to socialist literature. W. E. B. Du Bois wrote Black Reconstruction in America challenging the Dunning School, who had dominated American historiography of the reconstruction period with a conservative viewpoint that, he argued, paid scant attention to African-American contributions in the American Civil War and the subsequent reconstruction. This approach was shared also by some European socialist writers such as Algie Martin Simons, who wrote in Class Struggle in America that the anti-slavery character of the war was a myth and that the enslaved Africans played no role in their liberation. This viewpoint both reflected and reinforced the failure of the Socialist Party of America to oppose the white supremacist views of the time and their embodiment in Jim Crow laws.

=== Earliest examples ===
Peter H. Clark is generally recognised as the first African-American socialist. Clark was a well-established educator and associated with a number of political parties. In 1877 he joined the Workingmen's Party, a socialist party that would precursor the Socialist Labor Party of America. Clark vocally supported the efforts of underrepresented African American strikers in Louisville, Kentucky during the violent Great Railroad Strike of 1877. As an established representative of the Workingmen's Party, Clark traveled from his hometown Cincinnati to Louisville in advocacy of the strikes and urged his fellow people to support the socialist party to further the progression of their goals for fair wages and capitalist control of government. Local chapters of the Workingmen's Party in Louisville refused to advocate on behalf of African American laborers; many were exempted from labor unions and fair wages in the aftermath of the strikes.

Some of Clark's family were part of a "phalanx", a kind of commune founded by followers of Charles Fourier. He also met Thomas and Maria Varney, founders of The Herald of Truth, and Clark was employed to work as stereotypist on this paper and a sister journal, the Cincinnati Herald which was a voice for the local free soil movement.

=== Post-Civil War and Reconstruction ===
With the conclusion of the American Civil War and the ratification of the 13th Amendment in 1865, many African-Americans were granted freedom. However, the newly freed slaves were not given any land in compensation, which greatly impeded efforts to attain economic equality. Without the capital to grow wealth nor the experience to take skilled jobs, many ended up simply transitioning from enslavement on plantations to low-skill wage labor on plantations. There they experienced unfair wages and unsafe working conditions similar to the pre-Civil War days. W.E.B Du Bois' Black Reconstruction in America, published in 1935, was written about this time period.

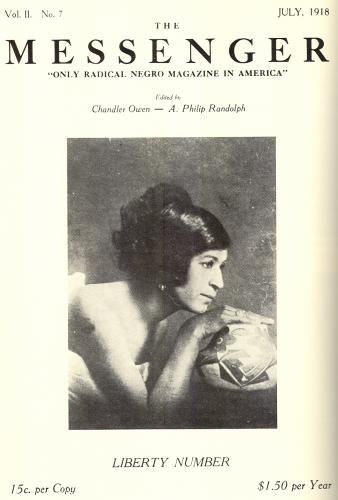
July 1918 cover of The Messenger

Following the Great Migration of African American's fleeing the South and the events of World War 1, the Harlem Renaissance acted as a catalyst for many of the radical African-American socio-political movements of the early 20th century. During the 1910s the predominantly African-American populated neighborhood of Harlem, Manhattan, was home to many emerging African American activists, intellectuals, and artists that cultivated a community centered around the progression of peoples of African descent. Harlem became home to both African Americans and immigrant Afro-Caribbean and African peoples. A. Philip Randolph and Chandler Owens are two of the most well-known socialists of the Renaissance. Most notably they began The Messenger, a radical literary magazine in 1917, which frequently featured articles advocating for African American support for socialism.

=== Church and socialism ===
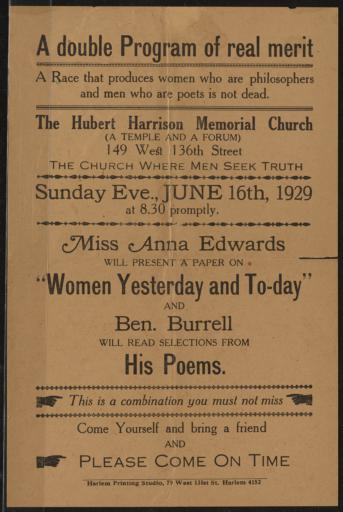
Hubert Harrison Memorial Church pamphlet

The church has emerged as a location for community organization and radicalization throughout African American history. Harlem based Reverend E. Ethelred Brown and the Los Angeles–based preacher George Washington Woodbey used their churches as a stage to educate African Americans on Socialist ideology.

Woodbey was a Californian minister and representative delegate of the Socialist Party of America from 1904 to 1908. He believed that socialism was morally aligned with Christianity and that the problems faced by African Americans would be solved as the issues of class were solved. Unlike his predecessor Peter H. Clark and many of those who would succeed him, he did not believe in race first ideology; rather he believed in that class should be the primary concern of socialism and issues of race will be secondarily solved in the process of class equality.

The Unitarian Reverend Brown arrived in Harlem from Jamaica in 1920, where he was introduced to a number of intellectual and political radicals of the time including Claude McKay and Frank Crosswaith, and engaged in the study of socialism. By 1928, Brown was the Reverend of his own church, the Hubert Harrison Memorial Church, where he gave religious sermons and advocated for socialist ideals. Brown believed that socialism was a logical socio-political ideology to represent his religious philosophy, and the ideals of socialism shared the same interests of African-American and Afro-Caribbean peoples to attain economic and labor equality. Brown was hired by the Socialist Party of America as a speaker and the Christian socialist publication World of Tomorrow as the office secretary.

=== African-Americans and the American Socialist Party ===
The Socialist Party of America was composed largely of European immigrants, but its failure to engage with the reality of US race-relations contrasted sharply with that of the previous generation of migrant European radicals, such as the forty-eighters—many of whom took a firm anti-slavery stance during events such as the Camp Jackson affair. During 1920s and 30s, many African-American backers of predominantly white socialist parties felt disgruntled by the lack of consideration and respect from white counterparts within the organizations and abandoned socialist ideology for Communism or anarchism. Many African Americans engaging in socialist discourse during this period maintained both class-analysis and racial awareness. Due to their unique circumstances of racial segregation and racial violence, a socialist African American could not disconnect race from class issues. Hubert Harrison was hired by the American Socialist Party after criticizing its lack of African American advocacy and delegates in 1911; in 1914 he left the party due to its lack of support for peoples of color and transitioned to support the International Workers of the World. He continued to advocate as a socialist but centered his efforts around African American advocacy.

W. E. B. Du Bois was a practicing socialist before his brief membership with the Socialist Party of America from 1911 to 1912. He left the party in support Woodrow Wilson over the party candidate Eugene V. Debs. After his egress from the party he continually criticized it for its lack of follow-through on claims of racial inequality, as many of its labor unions remained segregated.

A number of African-Americans involved with the Socialist Party transitioned from support of socialism to Communism, or rejected socialism as a whole due to many of its white proprietors' "class first" rhetoric. Harlem radicals such as Richard B. Moore left the party to support the more revolutionary and race-focused ideologies of Communist parties. Cyril Briggs another early 1900s Harlem radical, rejected joining in socialist parties; rather he argued that African Americans and Afro-Caribbeans should adopt Communist militancy to ensure they would not be ignored by the reformist principals of white upper-class led socialists organizations

Not all African Americans left the Socialist Party of America though. 1922 Frank Crosswaith, backed by the Party, ran for Congressman of New York. Crosswaith was a student of the Rand School of Social Science, a school opened by the Socialist Party of America. Crosswaith was an adamant backer of the Party, and saw its class reformist ideologies as being ideal for African American socio-economic progression. Harlem activist, unionist, and politician A. Philip Randolph joined the Party in 1916; the party would go on to financially support his radicalized magazine The Messenger, and would back him on a number of political ventures including running for comptroller and secretary of state in New York. They would each remain active members of the Party late into their lives, as they went on to lead and participate in various labor and union organizations.

=== Great Depression ===
The Great Depression of the 1930s began after the stock market crash in 1929. However, it hit the Black population much harder than Whites. Black people were forced out of their already unskilled jobs. This caused them to face an unemployment rate of more than 50 percent, compared to their counterparts of about 30 percent. Black workers were being paid 30 percent below the white workers, gaining no relief from the Roosevelt administration from National Recovery Act (NRA). NRA public works rarely hired Blacks during this time, even though the stated goal was to not discriminate while hiring. Although the American Federation of Labor president, William Green, did acknowledge civil rights and asserted to oppose Jim Crow locations, there was nothing enforcing the affiliated unions to follow these allegations. Because many Black laborers were without support, they formed unions of their own, like the Brotherhood of Sleeping Car Porters. Because these men sought their own support, they were often lynched in both the North and the South, leading to a wave of strikes across the country in 1934. These events consisted of an organization among the unskilled and mass production workers, whom were not exclusively Black. As expected during this time, racism was the center of the industrial unionism. This is a labor union organizing method in which all workers of the same industry are organized into the same union. For instance, workers in the plant industry were placed into the same labor union, nationwide, regardless of an individual's particular job. African-Americans, in the most dangerous, dirty and low-paid jobs, were in the same union as better-paid Whites. Because of these racial injustices, African-Americans remained in the lowest ends of poverty, without legal support, throughout the years of the Great Depression.

=== Civil Rights era ===
The civil rights movement was largely dominated by figures aligned with some form of anti-capitalism. Following a victory in the Montgomery bus boycott, Martin Luther King Jr. invited black ministers and leaders to a church in Atlanta to discuss what would eventually become the Southern Christian Leadership Conference. Among those involved were Bayard Rustin, Ella Baker, and others. King had a more moderate outlook than many of his contemporaries, writing that he rejected the central tenets of communism which he saw as mutually exclusive to tenets of Christianity, yet nevertheless remained sympathetic to Marx's critique of capitalism. In a letter to his future wife Coretta Scott, he wrote that he was "more socialistic in [his] economic theory than capitalistic. And yet [he] is not so opposed to capitalism [he has] failed to see its relative merits."

The Federal Bureau of Investigation began surveilling Malcolm X as early as the 1950s, when Malcolm X wrote a letter to President Truman declaring himself a communist and began ascending amongst the ranks of the Nation of Islam. In contrast to the non-violent rhetoric espoused by the likes of King, Malcolm advocated the idea that African-Americans should defend themselves "by any means necessary."

Malcolm X was assassinated in 1965, but he had inspired others to continue in a similar path. In late October 1966, Huey P. Newton and Bobby Seale founded the Black Panther Party. Initially, the BPP engaged in armed patrols of local police, recording incidents of brutality and citing laws proving they were doing nothing wrong when accosted by police. These "copwatches" motivated the California state government to pass the Mulford Act, which outlawed the open-carry of firearms. Elsewhere in the country, Panther activists such as Fred Hampton were making important strides. In Chicago, Hampton and his associates successfully negotiated a nonaggression pact with the city's most powerful street gangs. He believed that conflict among gangs would only keep its members in poverty, and sought to create a class-conscious multi-racial alliance that would eventually become the Rainbow Coalition.

== Notable figures ==
=== Pre-Harlem renaissance (1870s–1910s) ===
- Peter H. Clark
- George W. Slater Jr.
- George Washington Woodbey
- W.E.B. Du Bois
- Hubert Harrison*

=== Harlem Renaissance (1918–1930s) ===
- Claude McKay
- Chandler Owen
- A Phillip Randolph
- Rev. Egbert Ethelred Brown
- Frank Rudolph Crosswaith
- Richard B. Moore*
- Wilfred Adolphus Domingo *
- George S. Schuyler
- Rev. George Frazier Miller
- Otto Huiswoud*
- Rev. E. Ethelred Brown*
- Benjamin J. Davis Jr.

*of Afro-Caribbean Origin

=== Civil Rights and Black Power era (1950s–1970s) ===
- Bayard Rustin
- Ella Baker
- Arthur Kinoy
- Paul Robeson
- Huey P. Newton
- James Baldwin
- Fannie Lou Hamer
- Martin Luther King Jr.
- Fred Hampton
- Angela Davis
- Kwame Ture
- Bobby Seale
- Robert F. Williams
- Elbert Howard
- Bobby Hutton

== See also ==
- African-American leftism
- Black capitalism
