= Ethelred Brown =

Jamaican-born American Unitarian minister

Reverend Egbert Ethelred Brown
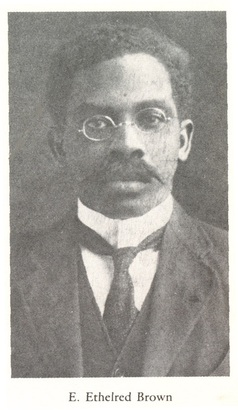
- Born: July 11, 1875; Falmouth, Jamaica
- Died: February 17, 1956 (aged 80); New York City, USA
- Occupation: Unitarian minister
- Known for: Founding the Harlem Unitarian Church
- Movement: Harlem Renaissance

Egbert Ethelred Brown (11 July 1875 – 17 February 1956) was a Jamaican-born American Unitarian minister. He founded a Unitarian church in Harlem, and became a leading voice in promoting the independence of Caribbean nations and liberal religion during the Harlem Renaissance.

== Early life ==
Egbert Ethelred Brown was born in Falmouth, Jamaica in 1875, the eldest of five children born to James Alexander and Florence Adelaide Brown. While still a child, Brown moved with his family to Montego Bay, where he was raised. He later wrote that it was during childhood he discovered Unitarianism, and began to consider himself a Unitarian without a church.

In 1894, at age 19, Ethelred placed third in an island-wide open competitive examination for the Civil Service of Jamaica. In 1898, he married Ella Matilda Wallace. He worked as a clerk for more than a decade.

In 1907, Brown lost his job with the civil service. Though describing this as "cataclysmic", Brown chose to see it as a sign that he should enter the ministry, and began to seek training as a Unitarian minister, while working as an accountant to support himself.

== Unitarianism ==
Though he ultimately secured a place at the Meadville Theological School in Pennsylvania, he was warned by its president that his future as a black minister would be uncertain, there being no black Unitarian congregations. Brown began his training in September 1910, and was ordained a Unitarian minister in June 1912. He held his first service at the end of that month in the Montego Bay town hall. He spent two years in Montego Bay and six in Kingston attempting to establish Unitarianism there, but the American Unitarian Association withdrew financial support in 1915. In 1920, Brown moved to New York City.

Arriving when he did, Brown found himself in the heart of the burgeoning Harlem Renaissance, in the words of Joyce Moore Turner a period of "re-imaging, re-resisting, re-inspiring, re-visioning, and re-formulating philosophical constructs by peoples of the African Diaspora" into which Brown's "religious and political liberal perspectives" became naturally woven. Within this radical milieu, Brown "anchored his ministry in Unitarianism as he had always intended, but with a humanist rationale, a socialist tilt and an anti-colonialism stance".

Brown founded the Harlem Community Church at 149 West 136th Street. In 1928, it became the Hubert Harrison Memorial Church (after Hubert Harrison, who had died the previous year). In 1937, it became The Harlem Unitarian Church.

== Activism and community work ==
As well as working to develop his church, Brown became an active participant in addressing the social and political issues of his community. This built on his efforts while still in Jamaica, where he had been founder and first president of the Montego Bay Literary and Debating Society, as well as helping to organize two civil rights organizations: the Negro Progressive Association and the Liberal Association in Kingston.

In Harlem, Brown's founding congregants included West Indian activists W. A. Domingo, Frank Crosswaith, Grace P. Campbell and Richard B. Moore. The church fore-fronted debate and discussion, hosting many radical speakers and addressing a range of topics. Brown delivered sermons on subjects including: "Christianity, Atheism, Agnosticism and Humanism", "Science and Philosophy", "Police Brutality in Harlem", and "Building the Church of Tomorrow". Crosswaith, Domingo, Campbell, and Moore, all made presentations there, as did Hodge Kirnon (who spoke on the work of writers including Claude McKay, Countee Cullen, and Langston Hughes). Topics debated included the value of religion in addressing real-world problems, asking "Is Religion a Vital Factor in Human Progress?" and "Can Christianity Solve the Race Problem?".

Brown's activism was interwoven with his ministry, but he was also actively involved in wider efforts for civil rights and racial progress. He founded, with Domingo and others, the Jamaica Progressive League (which "set in motion the movement for self-government on the island of Jamaica"), and chaired the British Jamaican Benevolent Association. He was also vice-president of the Federation of Jamaican Organizations.

== Death and legacy ==
Despite struggling for many years with Unitarian leadership, and suffering financially for much of his life, at 65, Brown became eligible for a pension. This he received until his death in 1956. Writing in 2008, Juan M. Floyd-Thomas wrote of Brown and his church that:

From its humble beginnings in 1920 until its dissolution in 1956, the HUC provided all interested parties in Harlem with an extraordinary venue in which to engage in open debate, social activism, and spiritual awakening through a radical brand of Black Christianity deeply infused with humanist principles.

Brown's papers are held today by the Schomburg Center for Research in Black Culture, at the New York Public Library, which writes:

Egbert Ethelred Brown maintained a forum for debate and a social and spiritual gathering place for Afro-Americans and Afro-Caribbeans for more than thirty years; through the Harlem Renaissance, the Depression, World War II and the early 1950's. Among his accomplishments, he endorsed the politicization of his community and interdenominational harmony.
