= Hodge Kirnon =

Historian

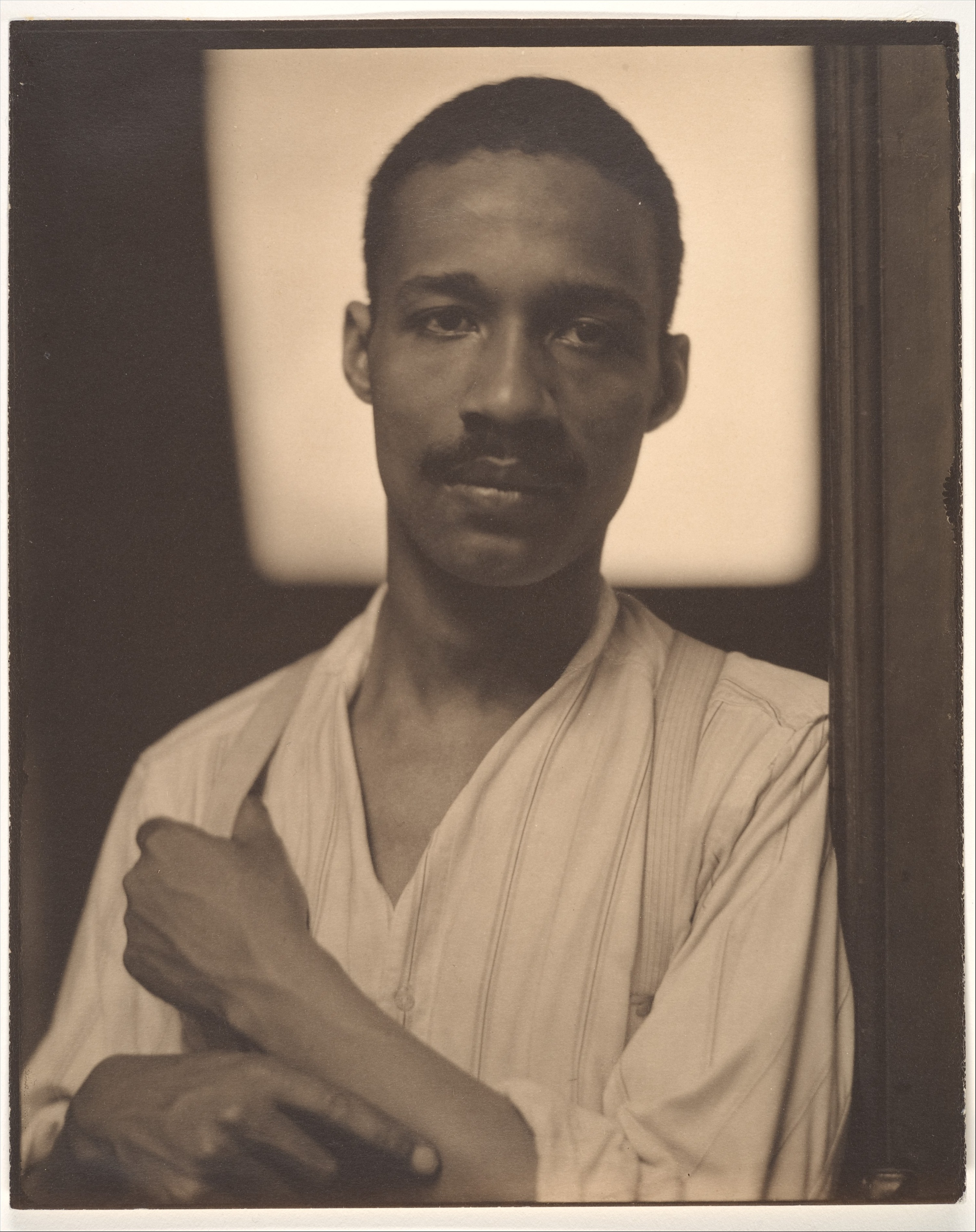
- Hodge Kirnon by Alfred Stieglitz, 1917
- Born: May 13, 1891; St John's, Montserrat
- Died: 1962; New York City
- Occupations: Scholar, historian, activist, elevator operator
- Employer: 291 (art gallery)
- Organization(s): International Colored Unity League; Harlem Educational Forum

Hodge Kirnon (13 May 1891 - November 1962) was a Montserratian scholar, historian, and literary critic, who also worked as an elevator operator at Alfred Stieglitz' gallery 291. He has been described as "one of the leading lights of the postwar Negro Renaissance" and as Montserrat's first historian.

== Personal life ==
Hodge Kirnon was born in St John's, Montserrat in 1891. He emigrated to the US in 1907, and married Laura Meade in New York on 14 June 1919. The couple had a daughter, Inez.

Kirnon became a naturalized U.S. citizen in 1928. He died in New York in November 1962.

== Activism and scholarship ==
In New York, Kirnon "established a reputation as a thinker and a journalist". He contributed regularly to publications such as The Messenger and Negro World, and associated closely with fellow Harlem radicals like Hubert Harrison and Joel Augustus Rogers. In 1920, he moved towards Marcus Garvey's movement, but was unafraid of criticising it. He wrote in support of the movement's "racial radicalism", but described it as "downright ignorance and unspeakable folly" not to work interracially in fighting for workers' rights. According to UCLA's Marcus Garvey and UNIA Papers Project, Kirnon believed that "Racial consciousness should... be developed alongside of class consciousness."

Kirnon began editing the "short-lived but significant magazine", The Promoter in 1920, described by Negro World as "radical and racial". He was vice president of and a speaker for the International Colored Unity League (ICUL), which called for "Political Equality, Social Justice and Civic Opportunity". ICUL's other officers included Harrison, John I. Lewis, and J. Dominick Simmons. Kirnon was also involved in the Harlem Educational Forum (HEF), alongside Richard B. Moore, Grace Campbell, and others. The committee believed in "the necessity of full, free and vigorous discussion as the only means of discovering the truth.” Its motto was "Admission free, thought free, speech free— eventually, mankind free." Kirnon took part in a debate at Ethelred Brown's radical Harlem Unitarian Church, arguing for "no" on the question: "Is Religion a Vital Factor in Human Progress?”

In 1925, Kirnon published a book called Montserrat and the Montserratians, based on a lecture at the Montserrat Progressive Society Hall in New York the year before. By 1928, he was chairman of the publicity committee for the Montserrat Progressive Society. Writing in The Messenger, Joel Augustus Rogers described Kirnon as "a finer poised and better equipped sociological thinker than any other Negro I know of."

== 291 ==
To support his scholarship and activism, Kirnon took a job as an elevator operator in Alfred Stieglitz' gallery at 291 Fifth Avenue, known as 291. Art historian Tara Kohn has explored the uneasy space occupied by Kirnon at 291, where he was both a part of, and apart from, the gallery as an artistic and cultural center. This is explored using Stieglitz' 1917 photograph of Kirnon as a starting point, where:

In the portrait, the dark skin of Kirnon’s fingertips trace the white fabric of his shirt, and he tugs at his suspenders in a subtle gesture toward the menial job he had taken to support his intellectual and cultural work: to lift viewers from the restless sidewalks of Midtown Manhattan to the attic-level artistic center... In the elevator, he crossed paths with artists—many of them foreigners and outsiders engaged in their own struggle of “getting up,” as the German-born painter Oscar Bluemner once put it, of negotiating the “vertical of American society”—who occasionally invited Kirnon into the inner sanctum of their circle.

In a 1917 letter, Stieglitz described his photograph of Kirnon as one "of the finest things I’ve done". Kirnon offered his own reflections on the gallery in a 1915 article for the photographic journal Camera Work, entitled 'What 291 Means to Me'. He wrote:

I have found in “291” a spirit which fosters liberty, defines no methods, never pretends to know, never condemns, but always encourages those who are daring enough to be intrepid.

In his role at 291, Kirnon has been described elsewhere as "the symbolic gatekeeper of sorts to artistic enlightenment".

Kirnon was featured as a character in the 2013 short film Looking for Mr. Stieglitz.

== Bibliography ==
- 'What 291 Means to Me' in Camera Work (January 1915)
- Montserrat and Montserratians (1925)
