= Walter Roberts =

Walter Roberts may refer to:

- Walter Roberts (American football) (born 1942), former American football player
- Walter Roberts (diplomat) (1893–1978), British diplomat
- Walter Orr Roberts (1915–1990), American astronomer and atmospheric physicist
- Walter Roberts (writer) (1916–2014), American writer, lecturer, and former government official
- Walter Hugh Roberts (born 1858), Welsh international footballer
- Walter Adolphe Roberts, Jamaican-born novelist, poet, and historian
- Wally Roberts, Welsh footballer
