= Lodie M. Biggs =

American bacteriologist, bookseller, and civil rights activist (1895–1971)

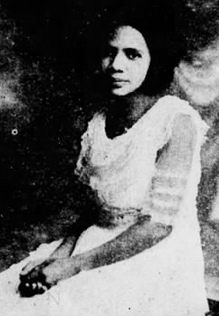
- Lodie M. Biggs, from a 1921 publication.
- Born: Lodie Maurine Biggs; March 1, 1895; Little Rock, Arkansas
- Died: March 1971 (aged 76); Brooklyn, New York
- Other name: Lodie Biggs Moore (after 1950)
- Occupations: Bacteriologist, activist
- Years active: 1928–1971
- Spouse: Richard B. Moore

Lodie Maurine Biggs (March 1, 1895 – March 1971), later Lodie Biggs Moore, was an American bacteriologist, bookseller, and civil rights activist.

== Early life ==
Lodie Maurine Biggs was born in Little Rock, Arkansas, and raised in Seattle, Washington. Her father worked for the railroad, and was a member of the IWW. She earned a bachelor's degree in chemistry at the University of Washington in 1916.

== Career ==
=== Bacteriology ===
Biggs worked as a bacteriologist at Crescent Biological Laboratory in Seattle. She also worked for the city of Seattle and the state of Washington, and ran her own commercial laboratory. In the 1930s, she moved to New York, and worked as a city bacteriologist there.

=== Activism in Seattle ===
In 1928, Biggs helped to revive the dormant Seattle branch of the NAACP, serving as its president from 1928 to 1930, and helped found and lead the Seattle branch of the National Urban League. In 1931, she attended the annual convention of the National Urban League in Minneapolis.

In 1932, she offered to resign from the Seattle Urban League's Health and Recreation Committee, when it moved to sponsor an all-black baseball team, which she felt was counter to the goal of racial integration: "Separate teams mean the beginning of racial feeling," she explained, "I do not approve and do not wish to be connected with an organization that would foster such a movement." Instead, the committee's chair agreed that she had a point, and set a policy against segregated teams.

=== Activism in New York City ===
By 1937, she was living in New York, and was secretary of the Harlem Citizens' Committee to Aid the Striking Seamen. She also served on the committee that became the Harlem Tenants Association that year. In 1942, she worked with Richard B. Moore, the Barbadian-born writer and activist based in Harlem. Biggs and Moore were both members of the Harlem section of the Communist Party, and both were expelled from the Party. In 1942, the pair founded the Frederick Douglass Book Center, a bookstore and community space in Harlem.

== Personal life ==
Lodie Biggs married Richard B. Moore as his second wife in 1950; they shared an apartment in Brooklyn until her death there in 1971, in her seventies.
