= Frederick Douglass Book Center =

- Named after: Frederick Douglass
- Formation: 1942
- Founder: Richard B. Moore
- Founded at: Harlem, New York
- Dissolved: 1968
- Coordinates: 40°48′31″N 73°56′50″W
- Owner: Richard B. Moore
- Sales Representative: Lodie M. Biggs

The Frederick Douglass Book Center served as a bookshop and meeting place for the minorities of New York City. The center contained literature that specialized in African, Afro-American, and Caribbean history and culture. The center remained in Harlem until it was torn down in 1968.

== Founder ==
The Frederick Douglass Book Center was founded by Richard B. Moore in 1942. Richard B. Moore was a Caribbean activist and businessman who stood for socialism and black nationalism. The Frederick Douglass Center was launched with help from friend and second wife Lodie Biggs. Biggs later went on to become the sales representative of the Center.

== Background ==
Richard B Moore opened the Frederick Douglass Book Center in 1942 on West 125th Street in Harlem, New York. Moore originally attempted to follow the example of George Young, the man who created the first Afro-American book shop in Harlem. The initial stock of the center was part of Mr. Moore's own private collection. Most of the books that were located in the center, however, were not for sale. In fact, the Frederick Douglass Book Center was not considered a "store at all". The Center grew into a meeting place of Caribbean activists around the state. These activists shared progressive or socialist political views. They also supported the advancement of the Caribbean economy and independence. These activists included Dr. C. A. Petioni of Trinidad; historian J. A. Rodgers, A. M. Wendell Malliet, W. A. Domingo, and Miss Vivienne Packer of Jamaica; Reginald Pierrepointe, Bishop Reginald G. Barrow and Lionel M. Yard of Barbados; Atty. Hope R. Stevens of Nevis; Dr Gerald A. Spencer of St. Lucia; Arthur E. King of Guyana; and Hodge Kirnon of Montserrat.

== The end of the Center ==
The center was taken down by the state of New York in 1968 for the construction of the Adam Clayton Powell Jr. State Office Building.
