= Atlanta Independent =

African American newspaper published in Atlanta, Georgia, United States

The Atlanta Independent was an African American weekly newspaper published in Atlanta, Georgia, from 1903 to 1928. It was one of the first African American newspapers in Atlanta. A Republican newspaper, it was started by Benjamin J. Davis, father of the civil rights activist Benjamin J. Davis Jr.
