= Benjamin J. Davis Jr. =

American politician (1903–1964)

Ben Davis
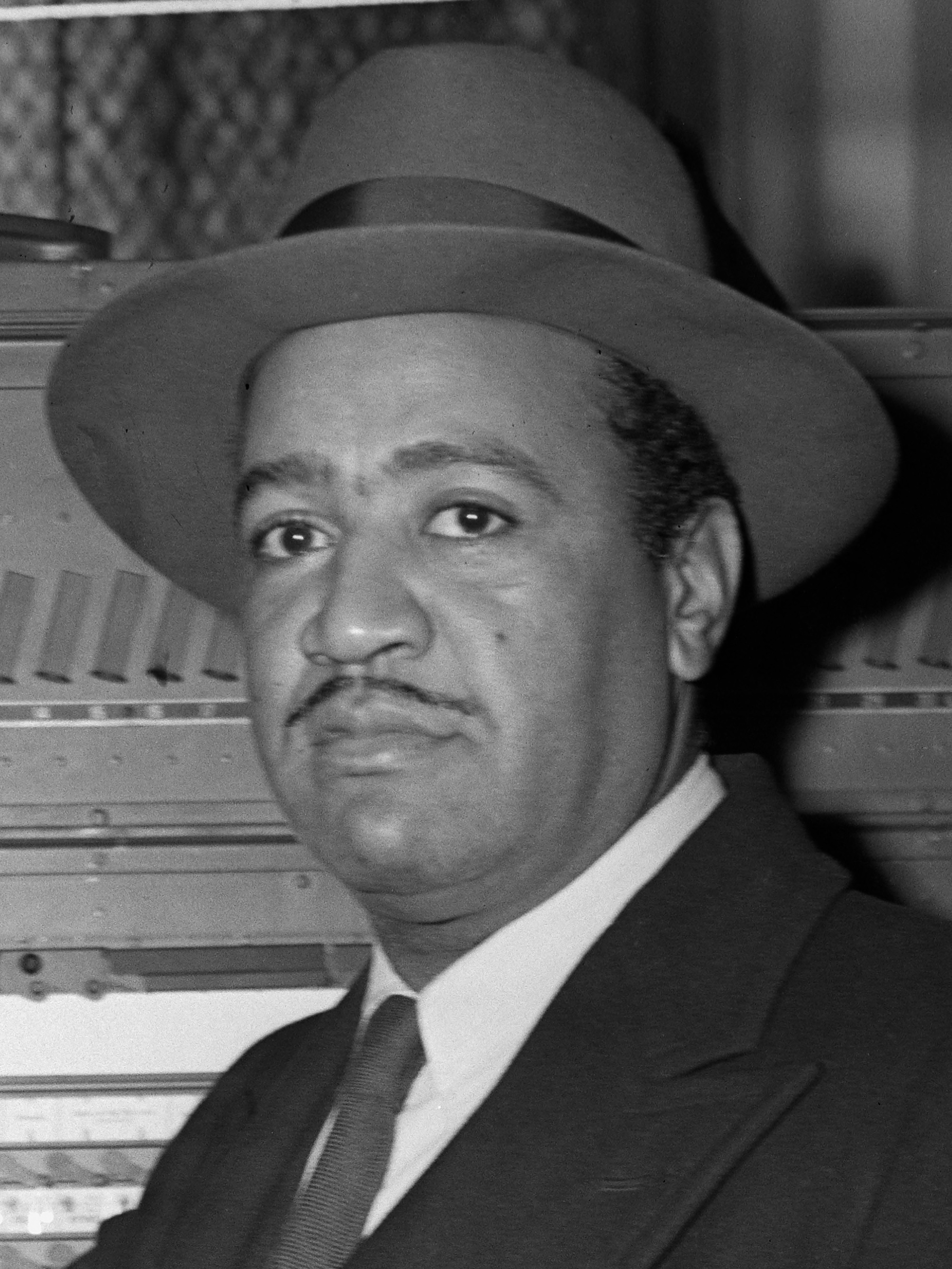
- Davis in 1946

Member of the New York City Council from Manhattan At-Large
- In office January 1, 1944 – November 29, 1949
- Preceded by: Adam Clayton Powell Jr.
- Succeeded by: Constituency abolished

Chairman of the Communist Party of New York
- In office June 6, 1957 – January 30, 1960
- Preceded by: George Blake Charney
- Succeeded by: Clarence Hathaway

Personal details
- Born: Benjamin Jefferson Davis, Jr. September 8, 1903 Dawson, Georgia, U.S.
- Died: August 22, 1964 (aged 60) New York, New York, U.S.
- Party: Communist
- Spouse: Nina Stamler (m. 1955)
- Children: Emily
- Education: Amherst College (AB); Harvard University (LLB)
- Occupation: Lawyer, activist, politician
- Known for: Smith Act trials of Communist Party leaders

Benjamin Jefferson Davis Jr. (September 8, 1903 – August 22, 1964) was an American communist, lawyer and politician who served on the New York City Council from 1944 until his expulsion in 1949. That year, he was among a number of communist leaders prosecuted for violating the Smith Act. He was convicted and sentenced to five years in prison.

The son of a prominent African American Republican in Georgia, Davis was radicalized and gained notoriety defending labor organizer Angelo Herndon in 1933. Following the case, Davis joined the Communist Party USA and relocated to Harlem, where he worked as a journalist. He was elected to the New York City Council in 1943, becoming the first black communist elected to public office in the United States.

== Early years ==
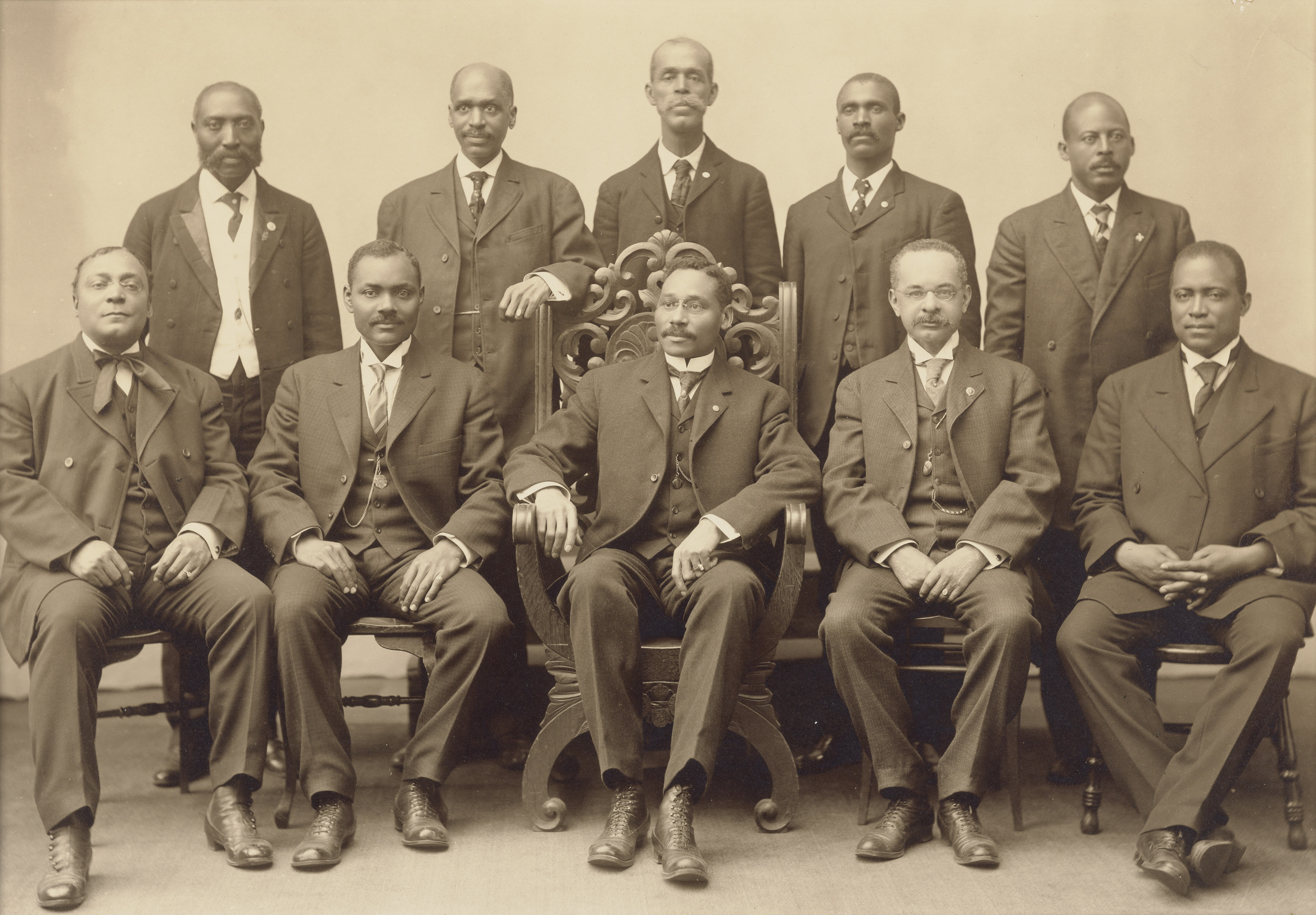
Benjamin J. Davis Sr. (seated, far right) on the Sub-Committee of Management and Counsel of the Grand United Order of Odd Fellows, 1908

Benjamin J. Davis Jr.–known to his friends as "Ben"–was born on September 8, 1903, in Dawson, Georgia to Benjamin Davis Sr. and Jimmie W. Porter. In 1909, the family moved to Atlanta, where Davis's father, "Big Ben" Davis, established a weekly black newspaper, the Atlanta Independent. It was successful enough to provide a comfortable middle-class upbringing for his family. The elder Davis emerged as a prominent black political leader and served as a member of the Republican National Committee for the state of Georgia.

The younger Davis attended the high school program of Morehouse College in Atlanta. He left the South to study at Amherst College, where he was a star football player, and earned his B.A. in 1925. He continued his education at Harvard Law School, from which he graduated in 1929. He worked briefly as a journalist before starting a law practice in Atlanta in 1932.

== Political career ==
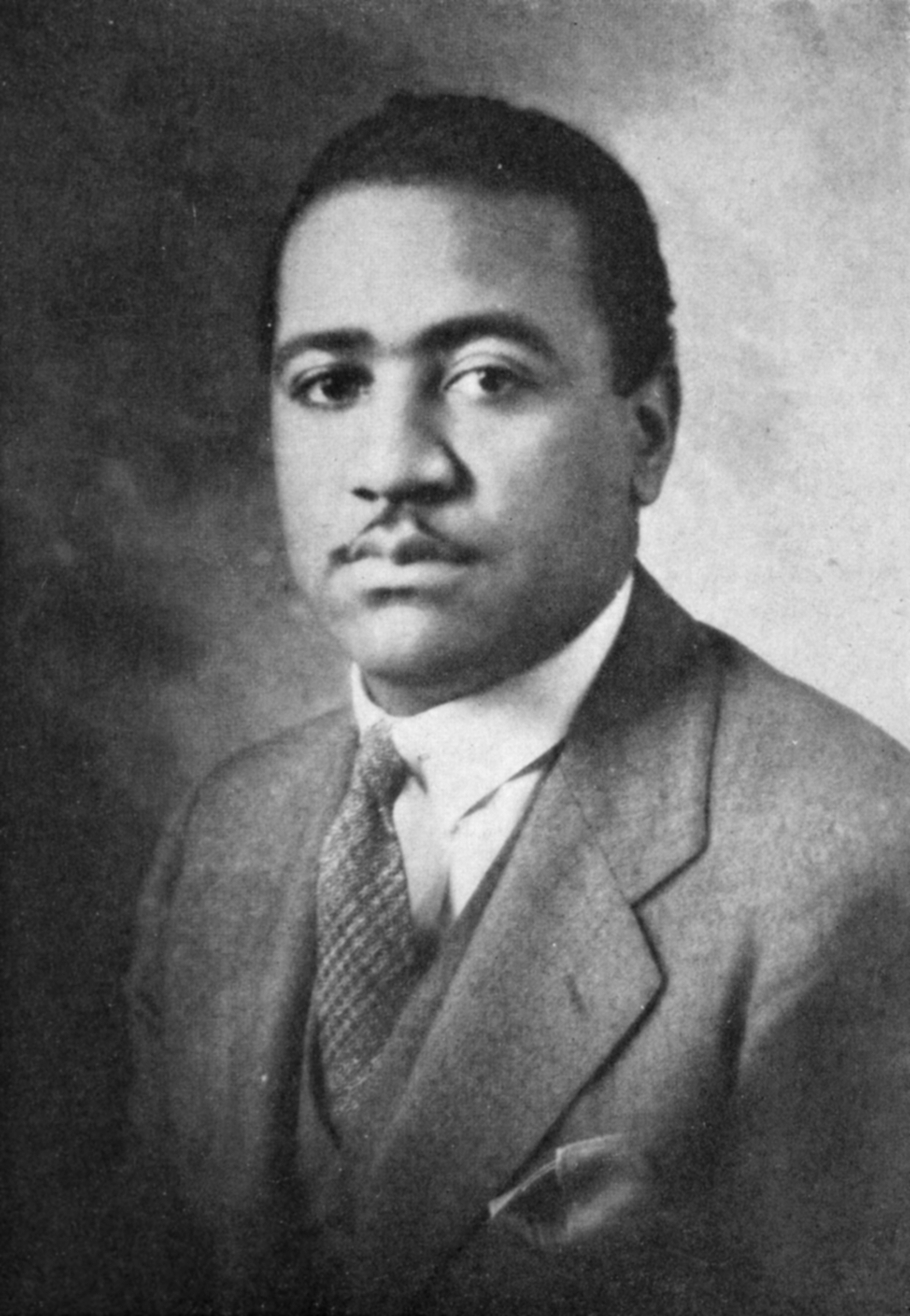
Davis, attorney for Angelo Herndon, c. 1935

Davis became radicalized through his role as defense attorney in the 1933 trial of Angelo Herndon, a 19-year-old black communist who had been charged with violating a Georgia law against "attempting to incite insurrection", because he tried to organize a farm workers' union. Davis and John H. Geer were hired by the International Labor Defense (ILD) to represent Herndon.. They consulted with the International Juridical Association on their brief to the court. During the trial, Davis faced angry, racist opposition from the judge and public. He was impressed with the rhetoric and bravery of Herndon and his colleagues. After giving concluding arguments, he joined the Communist Party himself.

Herndon was convicted and sentenced to 18–20 years in jail. He was freed after April 26, 1937, when, by a 5-to-4 margin, the United States Supreme Court ruled Georgia's Insurrection Law to be unconstitutional.

Davis moved to Harlem, New York in 1935, joining the Great Migration of blacks out of the South to northern cities. He worked as editor of the Communist Party's newspaper targeted to African-Americans, The Negro Liberator. He later became president of the CPUSA's official English-language daily, the Daily Worker. He was in the same party cell as Marvel Cooke, Richard Wright, and Ollie Harrington.

In 1943, Davis became the first black communist elected to public office in the United States when he was elected to the city council under the then-used system of proportional representation, filling a seat being vacated by Adam Clayton Powell Jr. to run for Congress. Davis's support extended far beyond the Communist Party; he earned 56% of first-choice votes in Harlem and was endorsed by numerous black celebrities. (Note: Including athletes Canada Lee and Joe Louis, civil rights activists Audley Moore, George B. Murphy Jr. and Julian Steele, labor leader Ferdinand Smith, performers Count Basie, Cab Calloway, Ted Curson, Duke Ellington, Ella Fitzgerald, Lionel Hampton, W. C. Handy, Coleman Hawkins, Billie Holiday, Lena Horne, Rex Ingram, Jimmie Lunceford, Charlie Parker, Pearl Primus, Luckey Roberts, Paul Robeson, Hazel Scott, Art Tatum, Fredi Washington, Josh White, Mary Lou Williams and Teddy Wilson, politicians J. Raymond Jones and Adam Clayton Powell Jr., religious leaders Ethelred Brown, Father Divine, James Herman Robinson and M. Moran Weston, and writers Harold Cruse, Countee Cullen, Langston Hughes, Alain LeRoy Locke and Richard Wright. He enjoyed support from several non-black celebrities as well, including José Ferrer, Doris Lessing, Walter Lowenfels, Merle Miller and Jose Yglesias.) He was reelected in 1945, this time to a four-year term, with over 75% of first-choice votes in Harlem. He was the second communist elected to the council, the first being Peter Cacchione in 1941.

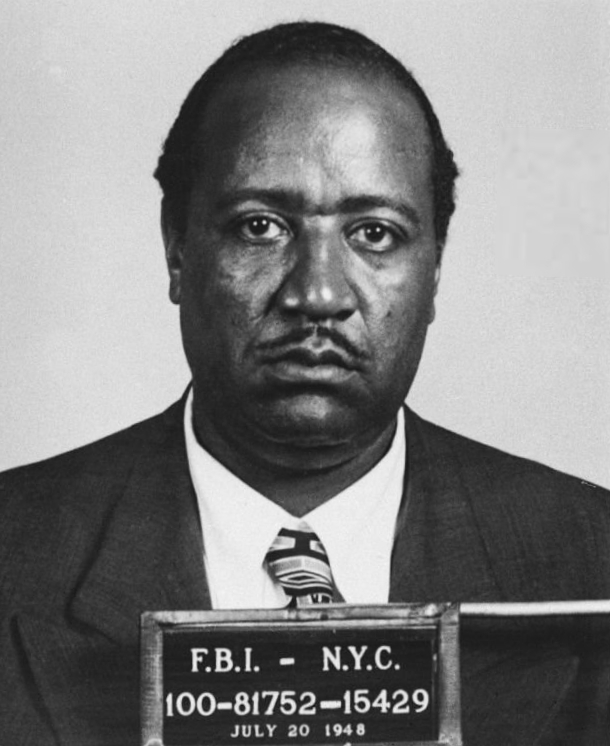
Davis's FBI mugshot, 1948

Davis lost his 1949 bid for re-election due to a number of factors. First, two years earlier, New York had ceased to use proportional representation and Harlem was broken up into three districts, diluting the black vote. Second, Davis's opponent in the new 21st district was journalist Earl Brown, a fusion candidate for the Democratic, Republican, and Liberal parties. Finally, in July 1948, Davis was charged with conspiring to overthrow the federal government under the Smith Act – a World War II-era charge that rested on Davis's association with the Communist Party. He was tried along with eleven other defendants for their communist beliefs and party affiliation in the Smith Act trials. Paul Robeson, noted actor, singer, and civil rights activist, publicly advocated for Davis and his fellow defendants. His conviction was announced on October 13, only a few weeks before the election.

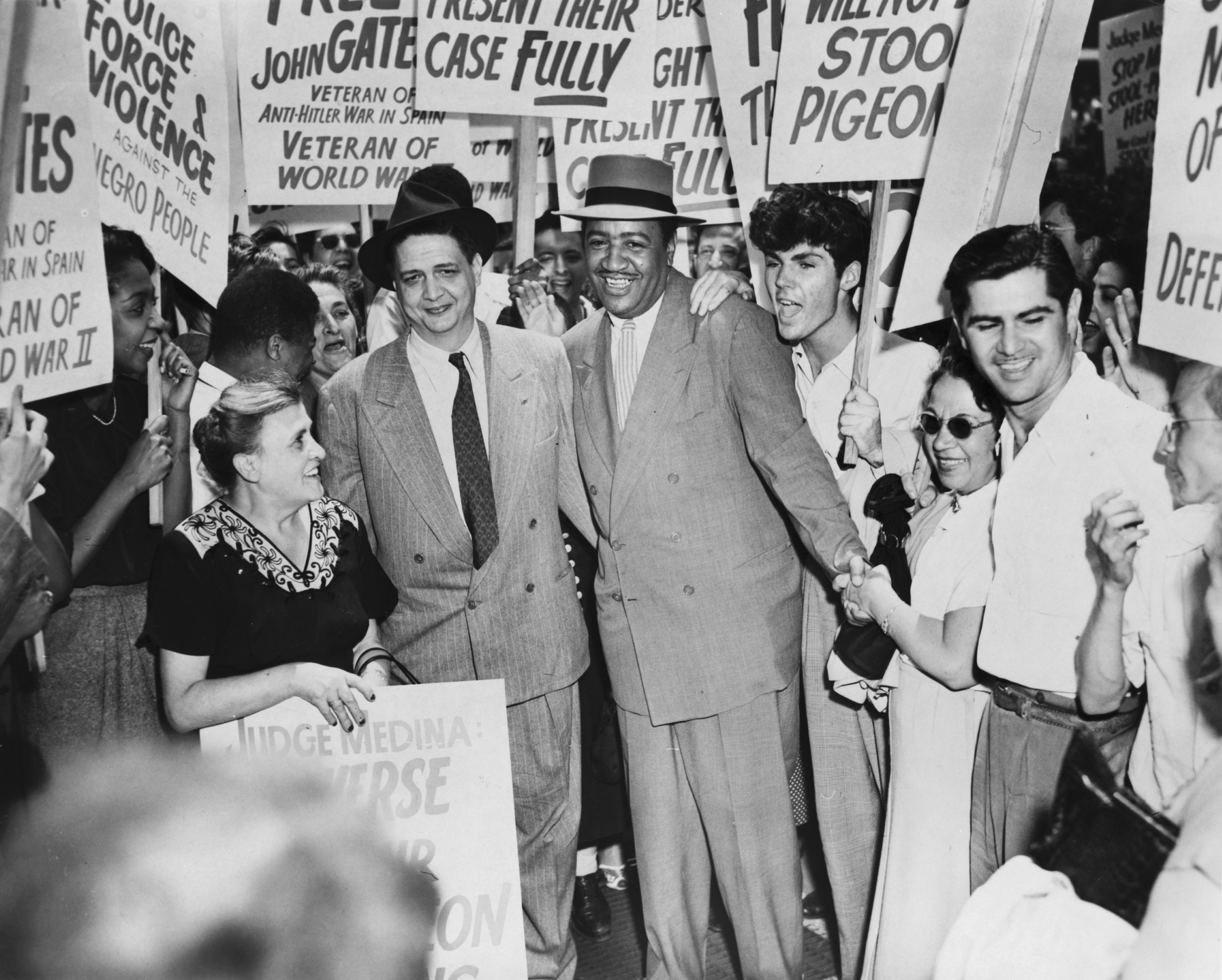
Robert G. Thompson and Davis leaving the Federal Courthouse in New York City during the Smith Act trials, 1949

With only a month remaining in his last term, Davis was expelled from the city council by a vote of 15-0, with two members abstaining. They did so on the advice of the City Corporation Counsel, which argued that Davis forfeited his office after his October conviction. While one of his colleagues (Eugene P. Connolly) resigned in solidarity, a majority of the rest passed a resolution celebrating his ouster. He appealed his conviction for two years all the way to the Supreme Court of the United States, without success. A still-famous benefit concert was held on September 26, 1952, to provide funds for his legal defense.

On March 1, 1955, after serving three years and four months in the federal penitentiary in Terre Haute, Indiana, Davis was freed. However, he was immediately transferred to the Allegheny County Jail in Pittsburgh, Pennsylvania, to serve an additional 60-day term for contempt of court. He had appeared there in 1953 as a defense witness for another group of five communists charged under the Smith Act, but was asked and refused to answer questions about unrelated individuals involved in the Communist Party's National Commission of Negro Work. In 1957, the Supreme Court revisited the Smith Act and reversed itself in Yates v. United States, which held that the First Amendment protected radical and reactionary speech, unless it posed a "clear and present danger."

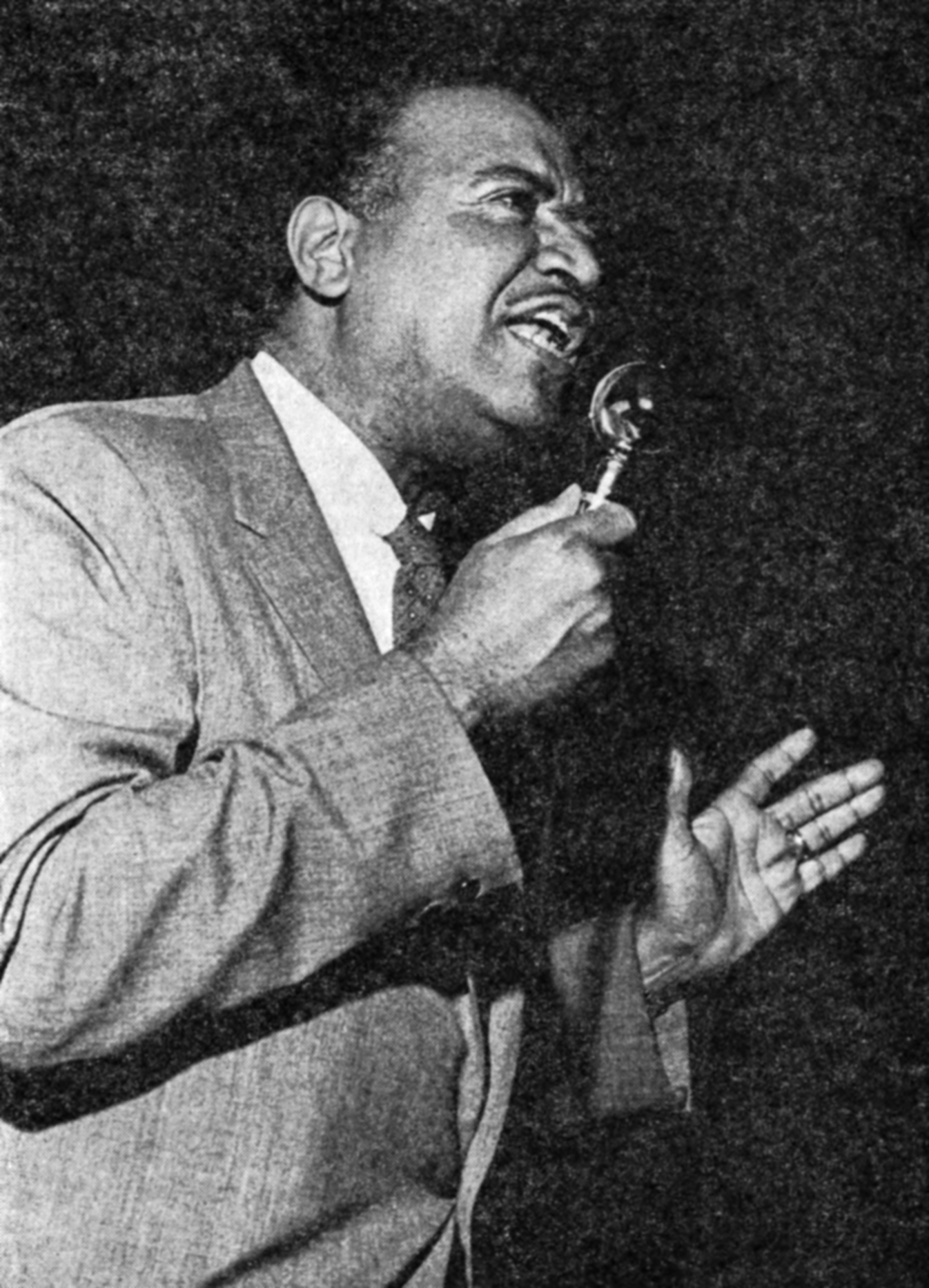
Davis speaking at a mass meeting in Harlem, undated

In subsequent years, Davis engaged in a speaking tour of college campuses and remained politically active, promoting an agenda of civil rights and economic populism. Davis' 1962 speaking circuit drew crowds at schools such as Harvard, Columbia, Amherst, Oberlin and the University of Minnesota. But the City College of New York – in the New York council district he represented in the 1940s – barred Davis from speaking on its campus in this period. After a student protest, Davis was allowed to speak outside, on the street.

Davis was elected chairman of the Communist Party of New York in 1957, serving until 1960. He continued to publicly defend the actions of the Soviet Union, including the Soviet invasion of Hungary in 1956. In 1962 he was charged with violating the Internal Security Act. He died shortly before the case came to trial.

== Personal life and death ==
Davis married Nina Stamler, an activist with the Civil Rights Congress, on April 15, 1955. Her father was a socialist dentist of Lithuanian descent. Together they had one daughter, Emily.

Davis died of lung cancer in New York City on August 22, 1964. He was less than one month shy of his 61st birthday at the time of his death, and was in the midst of a campaign for New York State Senate on the People's Party ticket.

== Legacy ==
While in prison, Davis had written notes for a memoir. These were confiscated by prison authorities and not released until after his death. They were posthumously published under the title Communist Councilman From Harlem (1969), with a foreword by his Smith Act codefendant Henry Winston.

To celebrate its publication, a cultural tribute to Davis was held on June 8, 1969, with Herndon, Claude Lightfoot, Herbert Aptheker, and others speaking. Expressing gratitude for Davis and the ILD, Herndon compared his struggle to that faced by the activists of the 1960s, saying: "You've got to fight, black and white together. This is the greatest monument you can erect to Ben Davis. You've got to tell them what Ben Davis did."

== Works ==
- "The Road to Liberation for the Negro People." (1937)
- "The Path of Negro Liberation." (1947)
- "In Defense of Negro Rights." (1950)
- "The Negro People in the Struggle for Peace and Freedom." (1951)
- "The Negro People on the March." (1956)
- "Must Negro Americans Wait?" (1963)
- "Upsurge in the South."
- "Why I Am A Communist."
- "Ben Davis on the McCarran Act."
- "Communist Councilman from Harlem"

== Amherst Olio gallery ==
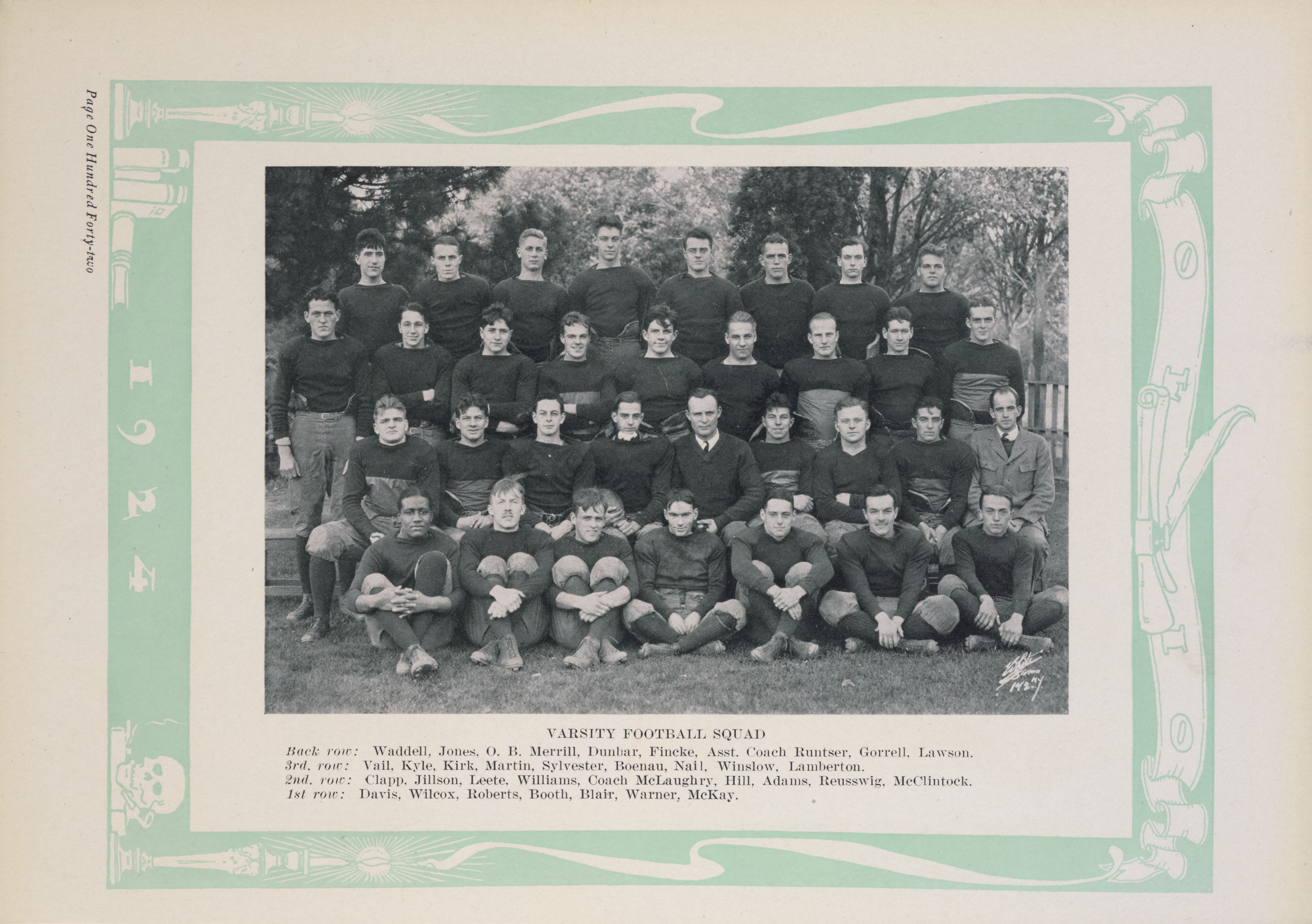
Varsity Football Squad, 1922

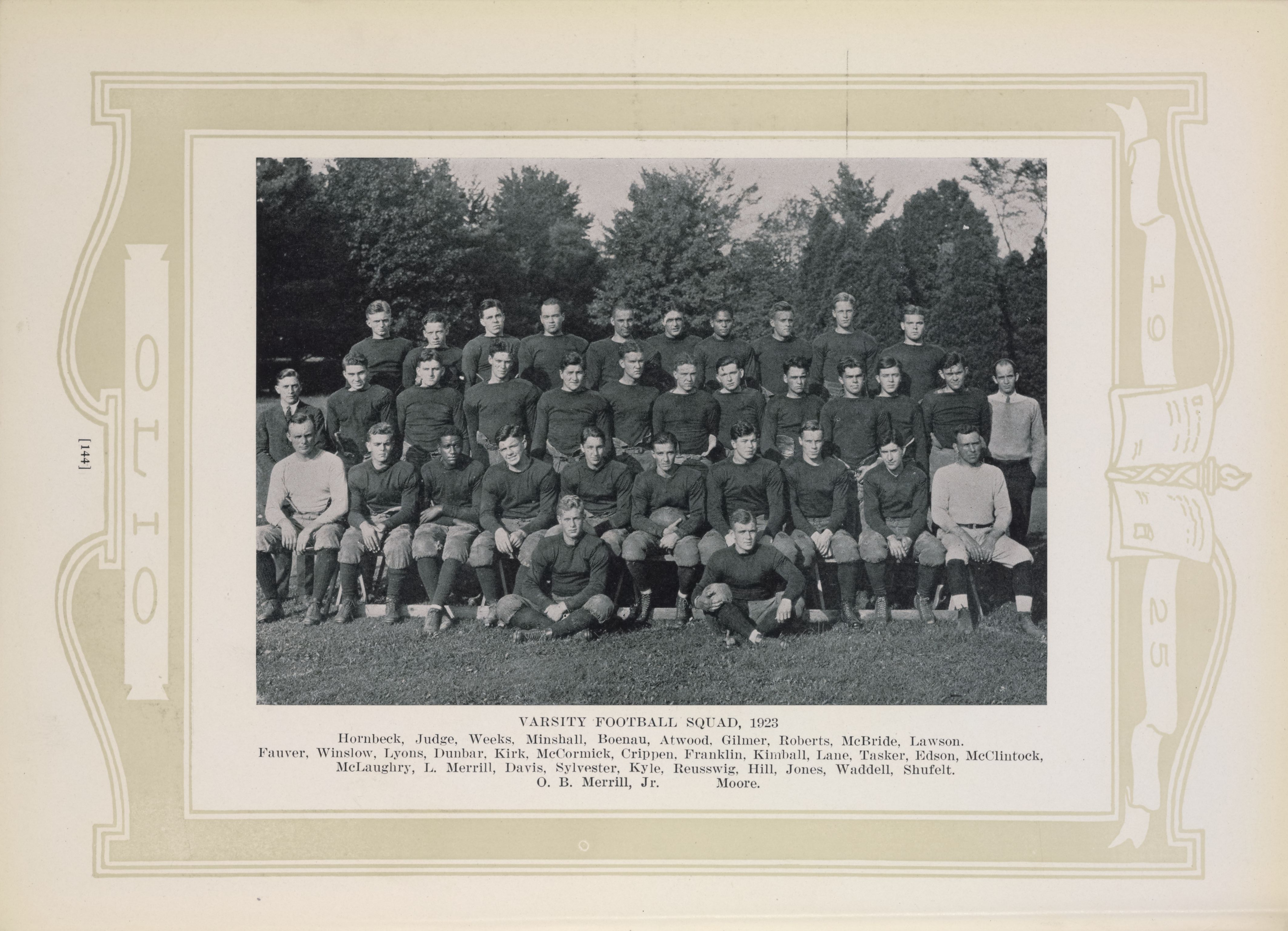
Varsity Football Squad, 1923

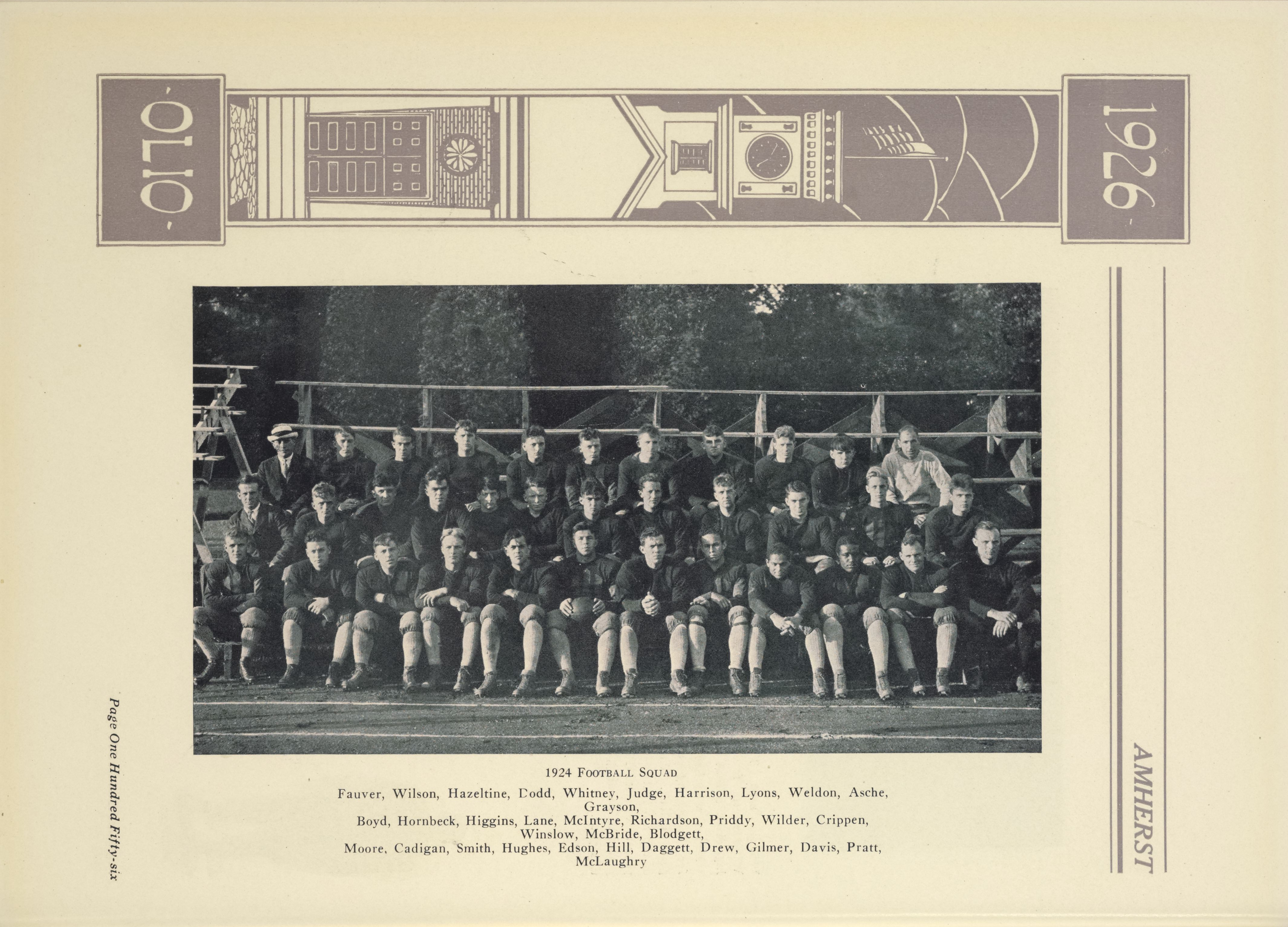
Varsity Football Squad, 1924

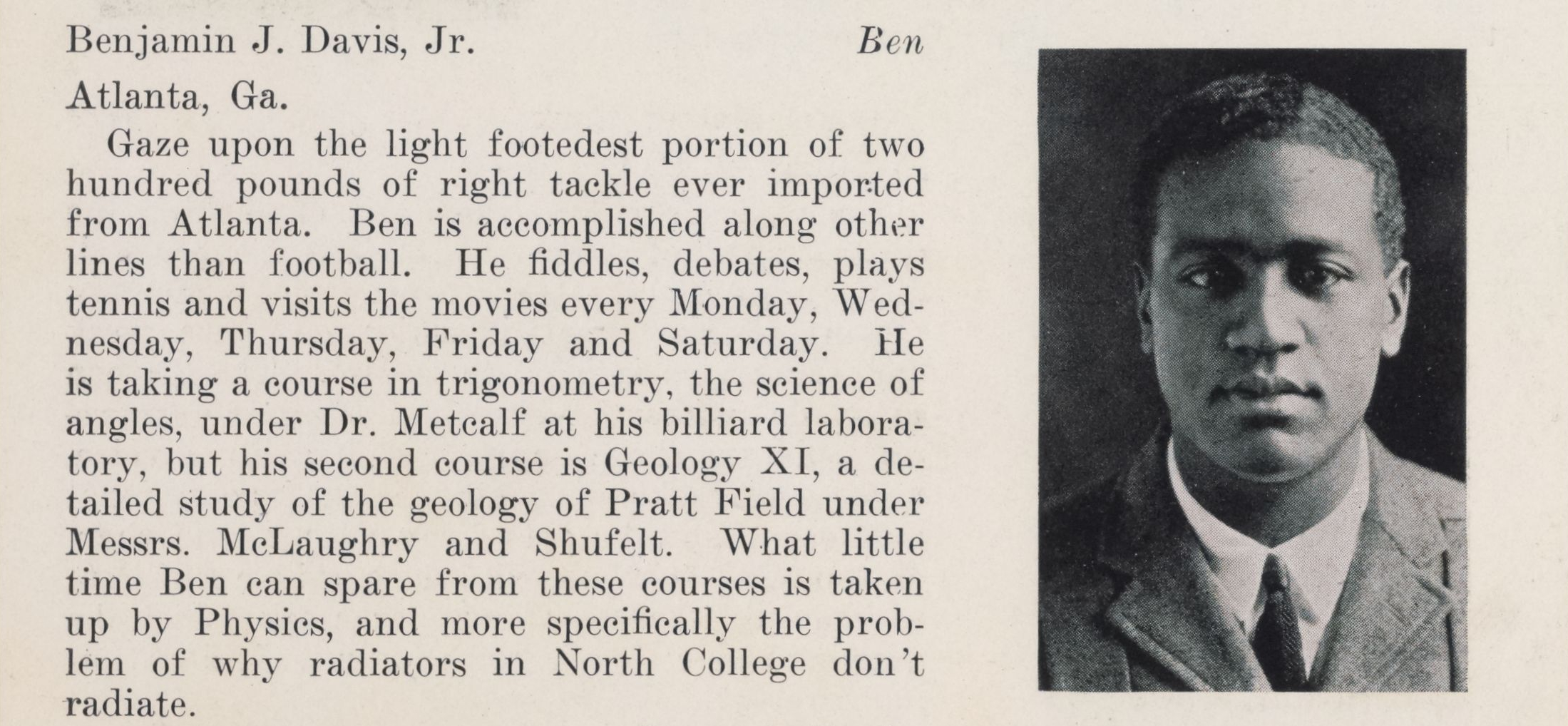
Profile, 1925

== Daily Worker gallery ==
"Ben Davis Addresses Brigaders" October 15, 1942

"Communist Leaders at City Hall" July 15, 1943

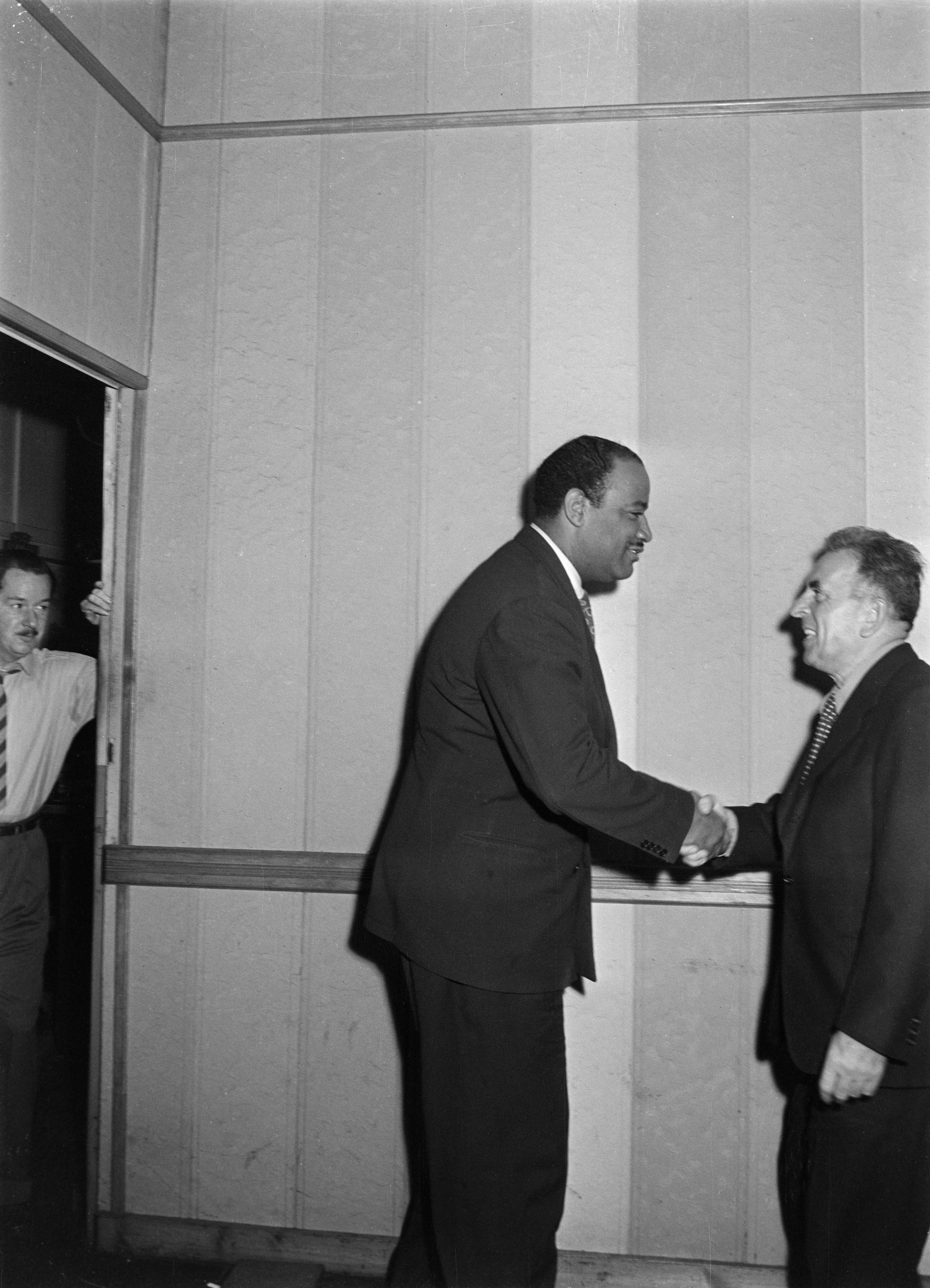
"Carl Brodsky withdraws from the election race to make way for the Negro Communist" September 1943

"Davis meets with the OPA on a delegation to curb black market activities in Harlem" October 1943

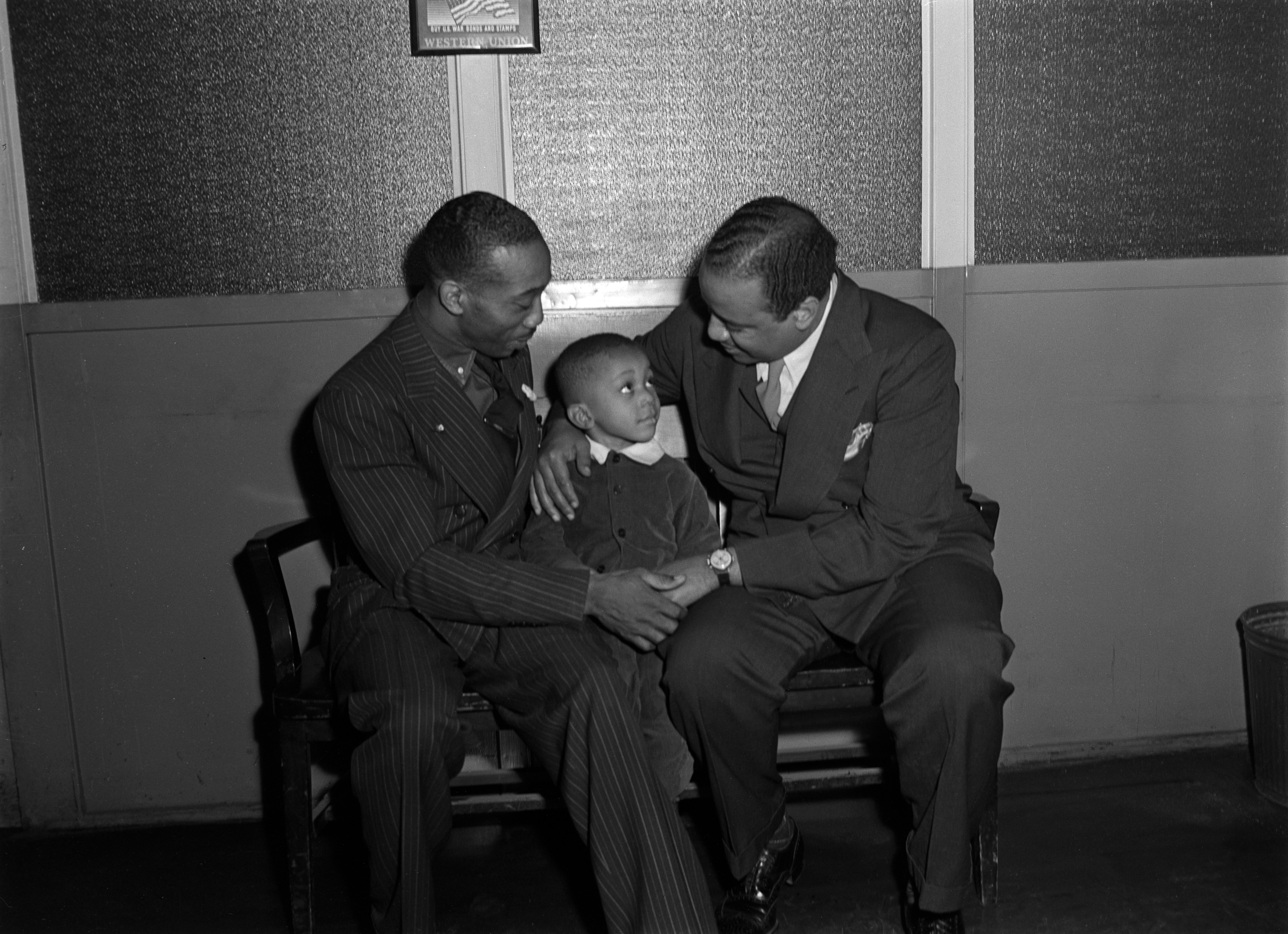
"He Got Davis 442 Votes in One E.D., Celebrates by Joining Party" November 11, 1943

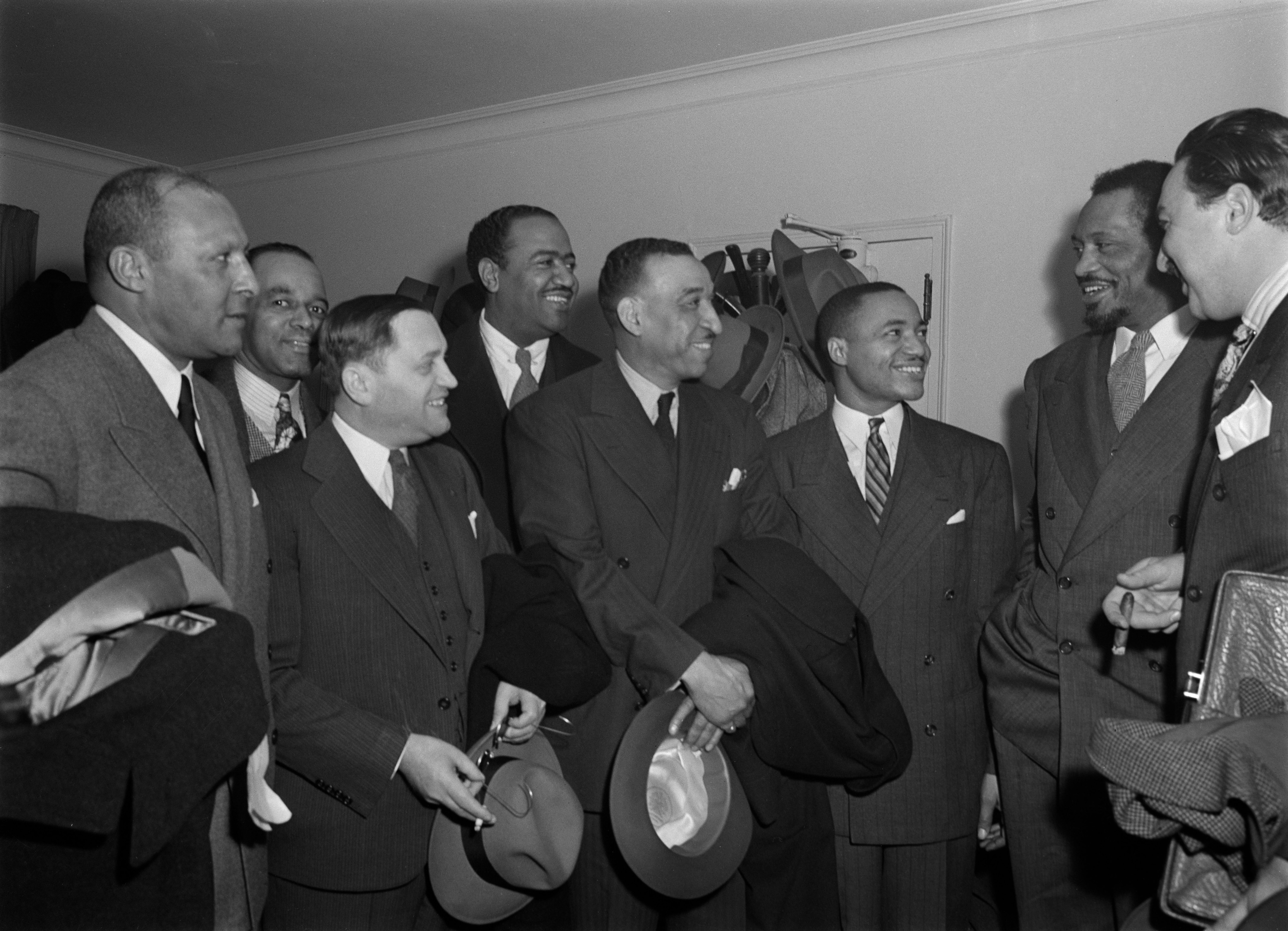
"At the Big League Meeting" December 3, 1943

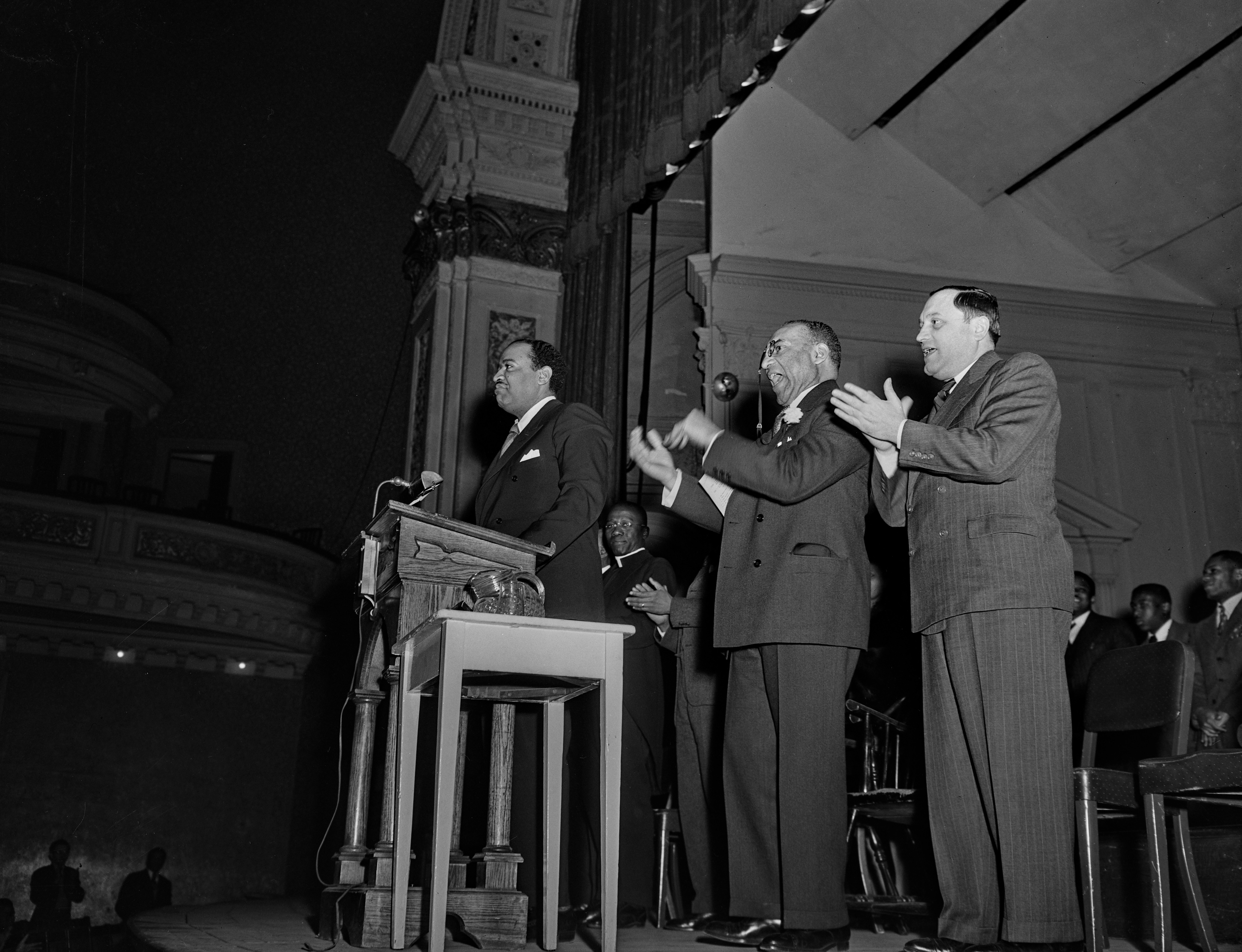
"At Emancipation Celebration" January 2, 1944

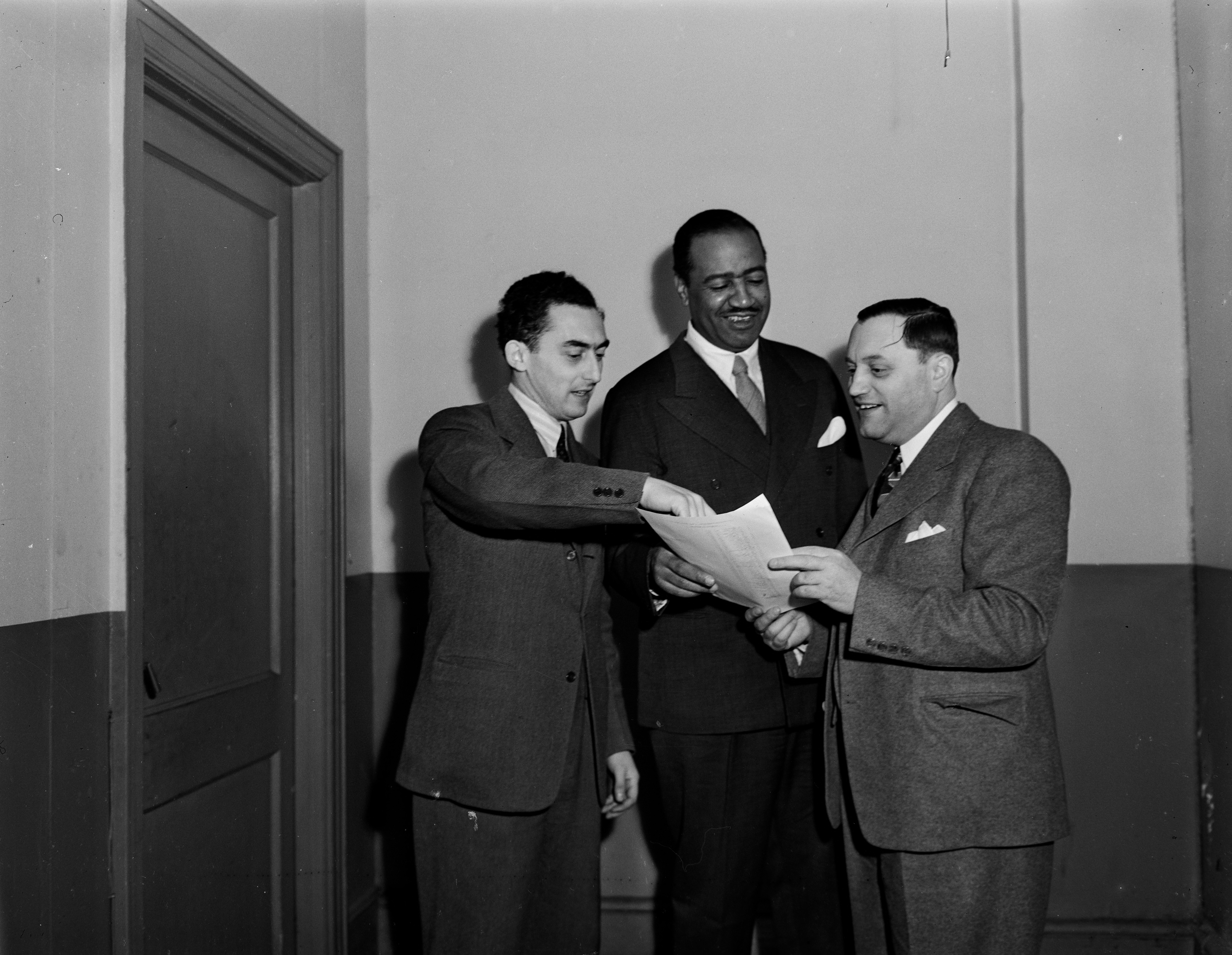
"The Race Is On" March 3, 1944

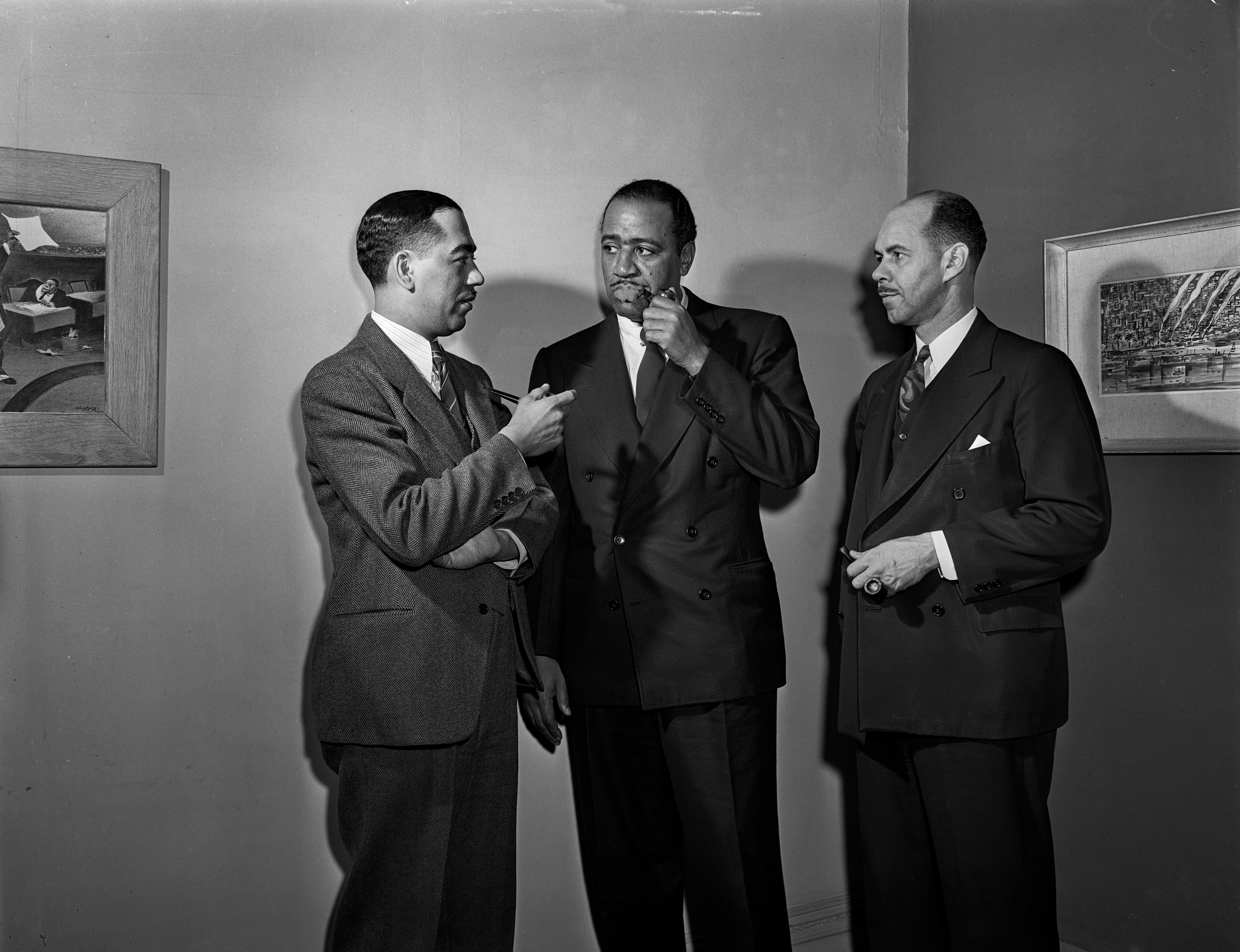
"N. Y. Age Editor Aids Davis Ball" April 8, 1945

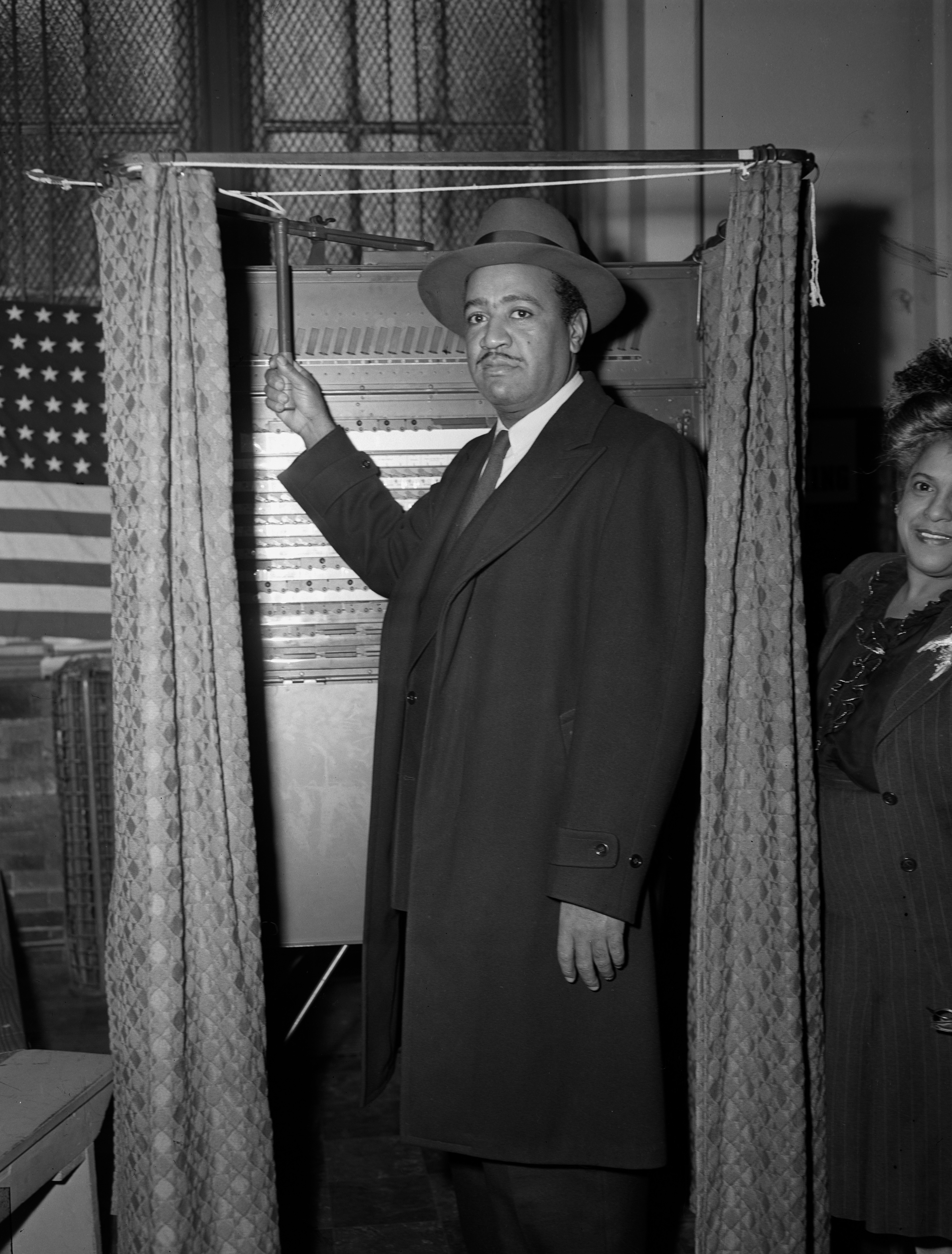
"Councilman Benjamin J. Davis, Communist candidate for Attorney General, casts his vote at P.S. 24" November 5, 1946

"View Returns" November 7, 1946

"Harlem Housing at Stake" December 6, 1946

"The 7th A. D. American Labor Party Club, Columbus Ave. and 104 St., after political vandals attack" July 14, 1949

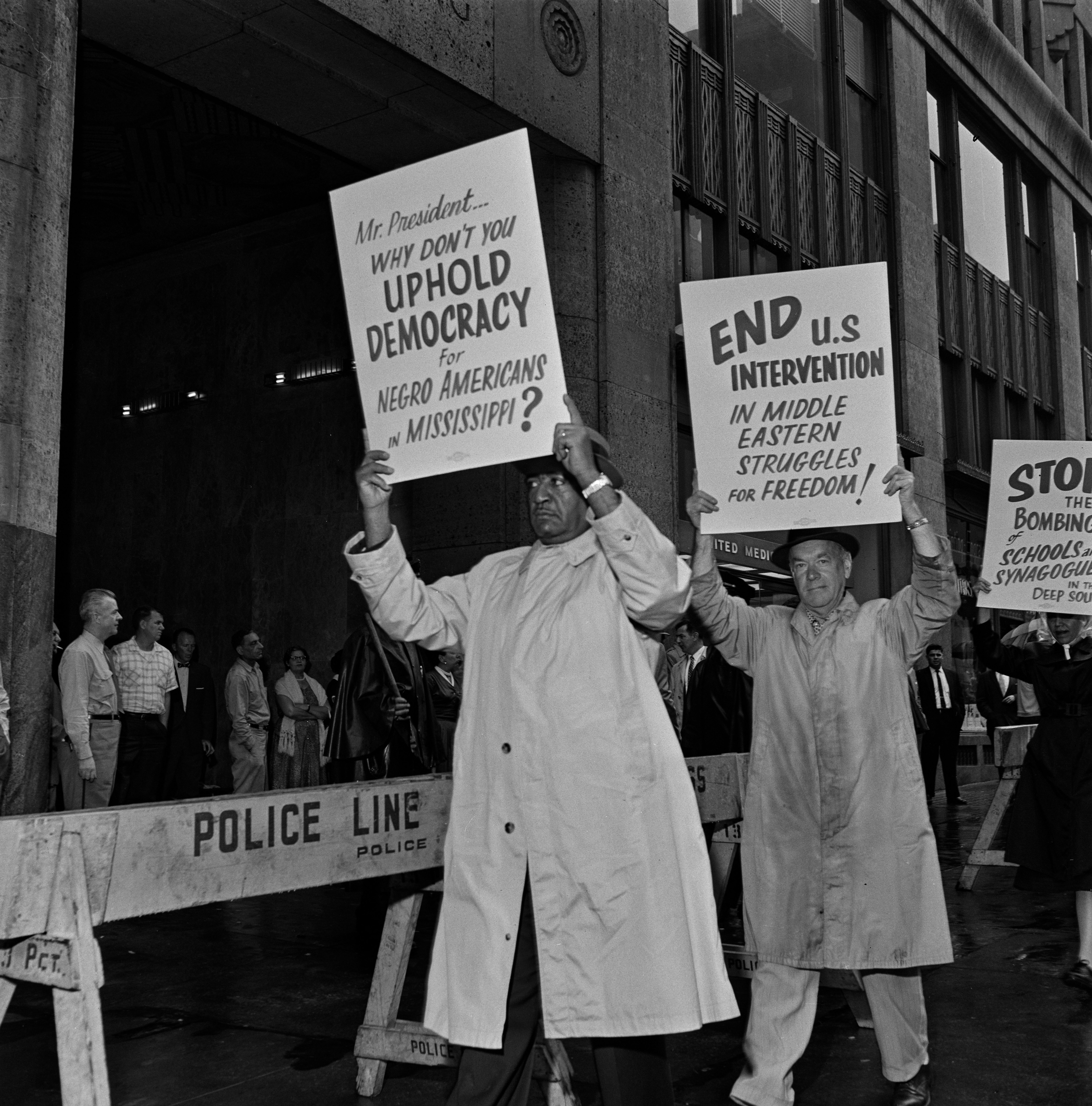
"Ben Davis Leads Picket Line at Lodge's Office" July 22, 1958

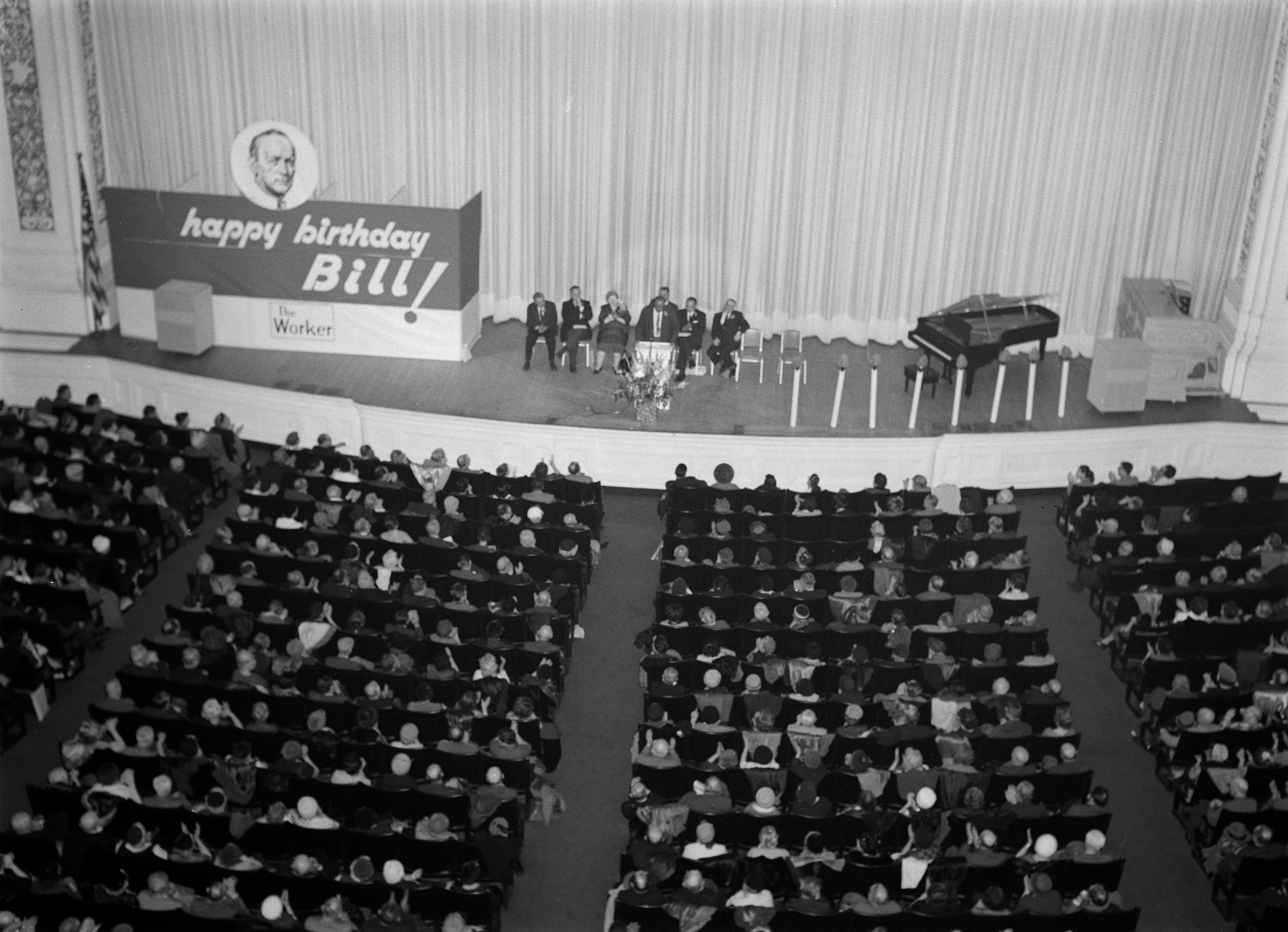
"Cheering Youths Spark Birthday Rally for Foster" March 10, 1961

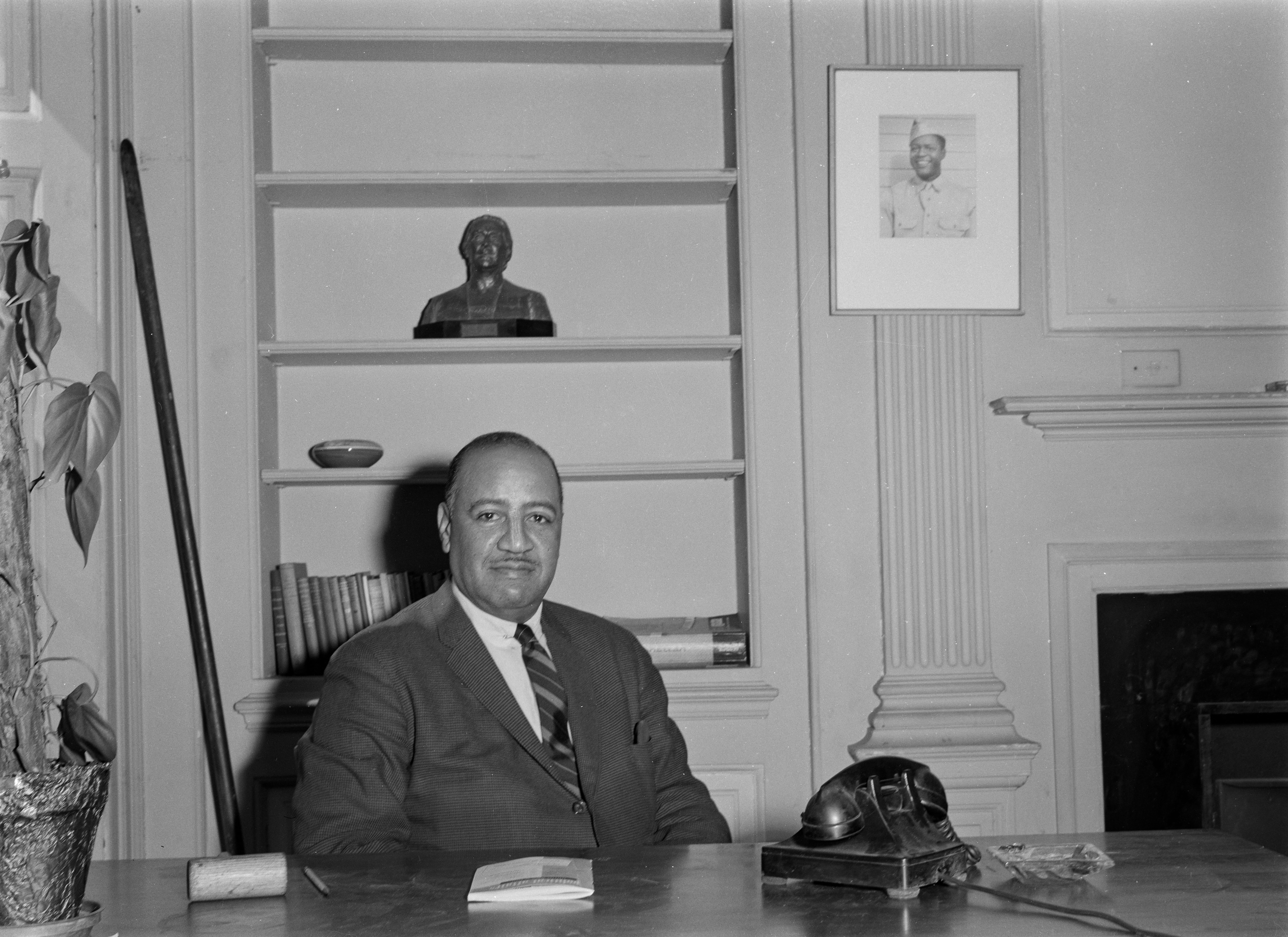
"Gus Hall, Ben Davis to Speak at June 7 Rally" March 15, 1962
