= Grace Campbell =

American political activist (1883–1943)

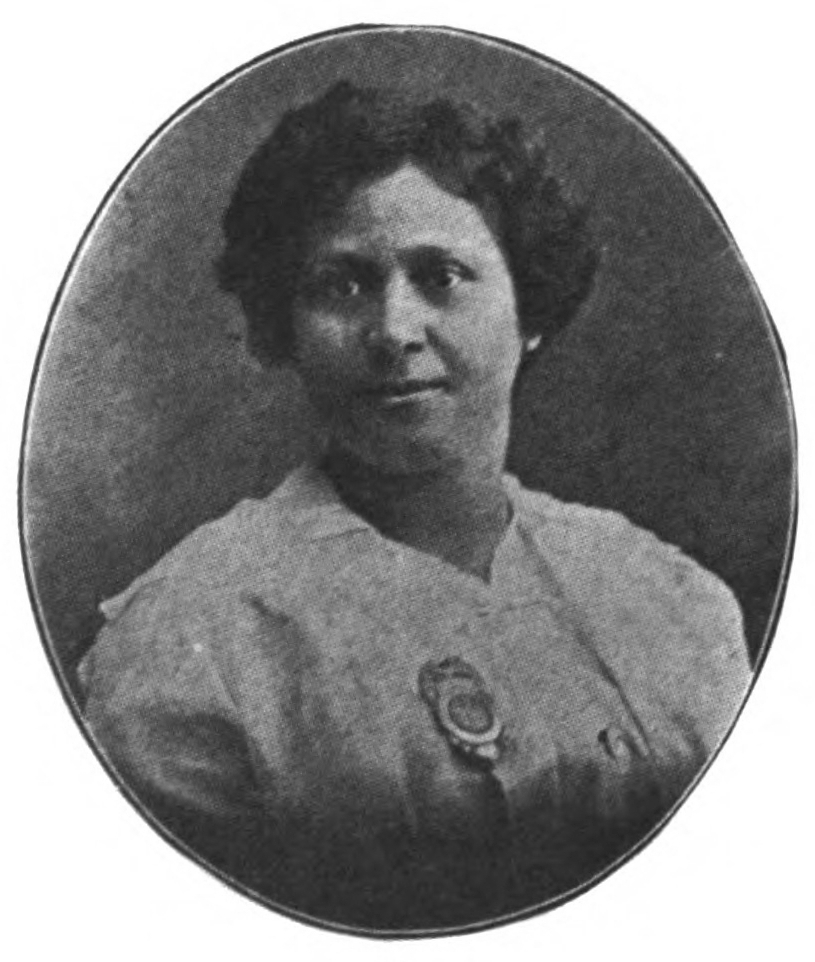
Campbell c. November 1920

Grace P. Campbell (1883–1943) was a social worker and political activist. She was a cofounder of the African Blood Brotherhood and the American West-Indian Association and the Harlem branch of the Workers Party. She was the first woman to run for public office in office in New York State. She was also the first female African-American member of the Socialist Party and the Communist Party of America.

== Early life and education ==
Campbell was born in 1883 to Emma Dyson Campbell and William Campbell in Georgia. Her mother was from Washington, D.C. and her father was an immigrant from Jamaica. Campbell's mother died when she was a year old. Afterwards, her and her father moved to Washington D.C. to live with Campbell's maternal grandparents. Her father eventually remarried and left Campbell with her grandparents, moving to Texas with his new wife and son. Campbell continued to live with her grandparents until she began her studies at Howard University. Upon her graduation, she moved to New York.

== Career ==
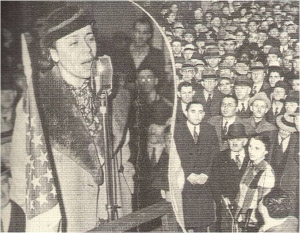
Campbell addressing a Harlem rally

When she arrived in New York City, Campbell devoted herself to community projects. She began her work with the National League for the Protection of Colored Women (NLPCW). The NLPCW later merged with two other organizations to form the National Urban League. As part of her role, she met Black migrant women at their boats as they arrived to the United States. Campbell ensured that they reached their destination and received appropriate resources; she did not believe that Black migrant women had access to sufficient state resources. Not long after, Campbell began her work as the first Black female probation officer. She supported the migrants immediately upon their arrival to the United States and throughout the visa application process, which included advocating for them in court and supervising them on probation. Campbell's credibility expanded as she continued with her work; she advocated for probation as an alternative to incarceration during her frequent speeches. However, she was eventually fired from her role as a parole officer for refusing to defer to her superiors. Campbell was later appointed parole officer of New York City. Campbell also worked as a court officer in the Women's Sections of the Tombs Prison in Manhattan, New York.

Not long after, she worked as a supervisor for the Empire Friendly Shelter for Friendless Girls, a home for Black single mothers. She donated part of her salary to establish the organization and funded it mostly on her own. However, she was only able to fund the shelter until it closed in 1918.

Campbell became involved in the Socialist Party of America. She was one of the founding members of the 21st assembly branch and the first Black woman to join the party. Campbell served as the branch's secretary. As her political views evolved, she also became the first African-American woman member of the Communist Party of America. In 1919 and 1920, she ran unsuccessfully for office in the New York State Assembly on the Socialist ticket. Campbell was supported by prominent activists Nannie Burroughs, Ida B. Wells, Chandler Owen, and A. Philip Randolph. Despite losing the election in 1920, her groundbreaking ticket won 10% of the vote, or nearly 2,000 votes, which was more than any other Black Socialist party candidate. Additionally, she was the first African-American woman to run for public office in the state of New York.

Also in 1920, she helped found the People's Educational Forum with A. Philip Randolph, Richard B. Moore, Otto Huiswoud, and Cyril Briggs. This forum was used to debate radical issues and discuss issues of race. It also opposed Marcus Garvey.

Campbell was one of the founding members, along with Cyril Briggs and others, of the African Blood Brotherhood (ABB). She was the only woman to help found the organization and also the only woman who served on its council. The ABB advocated for decolonization, unionizing, and self-determination. for Black people. During her time with the ABB, Campbell served in a variety of roles, including secretary, treasurer, director of the Consumers Co-operative, and member of the Committee of Finance and Executive Council. She also hosted weekly meetings in her home where members would discuss and learn about important issues of the time.

Campbell founded the Harlem Community Church alongside political activists Richard B. Moore, Frank Crosswaith, and W. A. Domingo in Harlem, New York. The church later changed its name to Harlem Unitarian Church. It advanced social activism in an attempt to create a space where faith and radicalism could co-exist. This is why even though she became an atheist after engaging with more radical politics, Campbell attended regular services.

Campbell continued her work and remained actively involved in politics and civil service until her death in 1943, aged 60.
