= Walter Adolphe Roberts =

Jamaican writer (1886-1962)

- Born: 15 October 1886; Kingston, Jamaica
- Died: 13 September 1962 (aged 75); London, UK
- Writing career
- Genres: poetry; history; war correspondence

Walter Adolphe Roberts (1886–1962) was a Jamaican born novelist, poet, and historian. Roberts served as a war correspondent during World War I, editor of multiple periodicals including Ainslee's Magazine, and authored over a dozen books.

== Life and career ==
Roberts was born in Kingston, Jamaica on 15 October 1886.

He was an editor, war correspondent, and the author of several books of poetry and prose, as well as a historian of Jamaica and the Caribbean.

In 1938 Roberts met Wilfred Adolphus Domingo and the two formed the Jamaica Progressive League.

During his lifetime Roberts received several awards, including the Silver Musgrave Medal from the Institute of Jamaica (1941), the Carlos Manuel de Cespedes Order of Merit (1950), the Gold Musgrave Medal from the Institute of Jamaica (1954), the title of Officer of the Most Excellent Order of the British Empire (1961), and was posthumously awarded the Commander of the Order of Distinction by the Jamaican Government (1977).

He died in London at the age of 76, on 13 September 1962.

== Bibliography ==
- Pierrot Wounded and Other Poems, Britton Publishing Company, 1919
- Pan and Peacocks-Poems, Four Seas Company, 1928
- The Haunting Hand, MacCauley Company, 1926
- The Mind Reader, MacCauley Company, 1929
- The Moralist, Mohawk Press, 1931
- The Top Floor Killer, Nicholson and Watson, 1935
- The Pomegranate, Bobbs-Merrill, 1978
- Royal Street: A Novel of Old New Orleans, Bobbs-Merrill, 1944
- Brave Mardi Gras: A New Orleans Novel of the '60s, Bobbs-Merrill, 1946
- Creole Dusk, Bobbs-Merrill, 1948
- The Single Star, Bobbs-Merrill, 1949
- Six Great Jamaicans, Pioneer Press, 1952
- Havana: The Portrait of a City, Bobbs-Merrill, 1953
- Jamaica: The Portrait of an Island, Bobbs-Merrill, 1955
- Caribbean Narrative, Heinemann, 1966,
- New Ships: An Anthology of West Indian Verse, Del Rey, 1978
