= Hubert Harrison =

American philosopher (1883–1927)

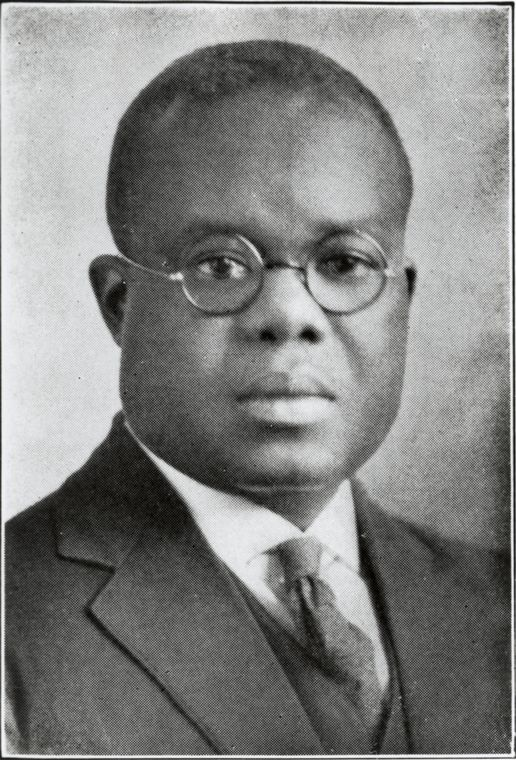
- Harrison c. 1920s
- Born: Hubert Henry Harrison; April 27, 1883; St. Croix, Danish West Indies (now U.S. Virgin Islands)
- Died: December 17, 1927 (aged 44); New York City, US
- Spouse: Irene Louise Horton (m. 1909)
- Children: 5

Hubert Henry Harrison (April 27, 1883 – December 17, 1927) was a West Indian-American writer, orator, educator, critic, race and class conscious political activist, and radical internationalist based in Harlem, New York. He was described by activist A. Philip Randolph as "the father of Harlem radicalism" and by the historian Joel Augustus Rogers as "the foremost Afro-American intellect of his time". John G. Jackson of American Atheists described him as "The Black Socrates".

An immigrant from St. Croix at the age of 17, Harrison played significant roles in the largest radical class and race movements in the United States. In 1912–14, he was the leading Black organizer in the Socialist Party of America. In 1917 he founded the Liberty League and The Voice, the first organization and the first newspaper of the race-conscious "New Negro" movement. From his Liberty League and Voice came the core leadership of individuals and race-conscious program of the Garvey movement.

Harrison was a seminal and influential thinker who encouraged the development of class consciousness among workers, black pride, agnostic atheism, secular humanism, social progressivism, and freethought. He was also a self-described "radical internationalist" and contributed significantly to the Caribbean radical tradition. Harrison profoundly influenced a generation of "New Negro" militants, including A. Philip Randolph, Chandler Owen, Marcus Garvey, Richard Benjamin Moore, W. A. Domingo, Williana Burroughs, and Cyril Briggs.

== Early life ==
Hubert was born to Cecilia Elizabeth Haines, a working-class woman, on Estate Concordia, St. Croix, Danish West Indies. His biological father, Adolphus Harrison, was born enslaved. One account from the 1920s suggested that Harrison's father owned a substantial estate. Harrison's biographer, however, found no such landholding and writes that "there is no indication that Adolphus, a laborer his entire life, ever owned, or even rented, land". As a youth, Harrison knew poverty but also learned of African customs and the Crucian people's rich history of direct action mass struggles. Among his schoolmates was his lifelong friend, the future Crucian labor leader and social activist, D. Hamilton Jackson.

In later life, Harrison worked with many Virgin Islands-born activists, including James C. Canegata, Anselmo Jackson, Rothschild Francis, Elizabeth Hendrikson, Casper Holstein, and Frank Rudolph Crosswaith. He was especially active in Virgin Island causes after the March 1917 U.S. purchase of the Virgin Islands, and subsequent abuses under the U.S. naval occupation of the islands.

== Emigration and education ==
Harrison came to New York in 1900 as a 17-year-old orphan and joined his older sister. He confronted a racial oppression unlike anything he previously knew, as only the United States had such a binary color line. In the Caribbean, social relations were more fluid. Harrison was especially "shocked" by the virulent white-supremacy typified by lynchings, which were reaching a peak in these years in the South. They were a horror that had not existed in St. Croix or other Caribbean islands. In addition, the fact that in most places blacks and people of color far outnumbered whites meant they had more social spaces in which to operate away from the oversight of whites.

In the beginning, Harrison worked low-paying service jobs while attending high school at night. For the rest of his life, Harrison continued to study as an autodidact. While he was still in high school, his intellectual gifts were recognized. He was described as a "genius" in The World, a New York daily newspaper. At the age of 20, he had an early letter published by The New York Times in 1903. He became an American citizen and lived in the United States the rest of his life.

== Marriage and family ==
In 1909 Harrison married Irene Louise Horton. They had four daughters and one son.

== Career ==
In his first decade in New York, Harrison started writing letters to the editor of The New York Times on topics such as lynching, Charles Darwin's theory of Evolution and literary criticism. He also began lecturing on such subjects as the poetry of Paul Laurence Dunbar and Reconstruction. As part of his civic efforts, Harrison worked with St. Benedict's Lyceum (along with bibliophile Arthur Schomburg from Puerto Rico, journalist John Edward Bruce, and activist Samuel Duncan); St. Mark's Lyceum (with bibliophile George Young, educator/activist John Dotha Jones, and actor/activist Charles Burroughs); the White Rose Home (with educator/activist Frances Reynolds Keyser), and the Colored YMCA.

In this period, Harrison also became interested in the freethought movement, which encouraged use of the scientific method, empiricism, and reason to solve problems in place of theistic dogma. He deconverted from Christianity and became an agnostic atheist similar to Thomas Huxley, one of his influences. Harrison's new worldview placed humanity, not god, at its center.

Like Huxley, Harrison became a relentless foe of theism and religious faith for the rest of his life. He denounced the Bible as a slave master's book, said that black Christians needed their heads examined, and refused to exalt a "lily white God" and "Jim Crow Jesus". He rebuked the famous motto, "Take the world, but give me Jesus", saying that it legitimized anti-black racism and discrimination. He also said that he preferred going to hell rather than heaven since Satan and his demons were black while God, Jesus, and the angels were white. Harrison repeatedly offered scathing rebuttals to both the Bible and the existence of God in his sociopolitical commentary. Theists, incensed at his outspoken disbelief, often rioted during his lectures and public speeches. During one such incident, Harrison disarmed and chased off a religious extremist who attacked him with a crowbar. A policeman arrested Harrison for assault, letting the assailant get away. A judge found Harrison innocent on grounds of self-defense and admonished the officer for detaining the wrong person. Harrison had been arguing at his event for birth control, and castigating Churches for advancing racism, superstition, ignorance, and poverty.

Harrison was a firm advocate for separation of Church and State, taxation of religious organizations, and teaching evolution in schools. He said that Caucasians were more like apes than black people, having straight hair and fair skin. He also famously remarked: "Show me a population that is deeply religious, and I will show you a servile population, content with whips and chains, contumely and the gibbet, content to eat the bread of sorrow and drink the waters of affliction." Harrison wrote in his 1914 book The Negro Conservative that "It should seem that Negroes, of all Americans, would be found in the Free-thought fold, since they have suffered more than any other class of Americans from the dubious blessings of Christianity."

In 1907, Harrison obtained a job at the United States Post Office.

He was an early supporter of the protest philosophies of W. E. B. Du Bois and William Monroe Trotter. Particularly after the Brownsville Affair, Harrison became an outspoken critic of Presidents Theodore Roosevelt and William Howard Taft, and of the Republican Party.

Harrison expressed disapproval of Booker T. Washington, a prominent Black leader, characterizing his political philosophy as subservient. In 1910, Harrison wrote two critical letters to the New York Sun, challenging Washington's statements. As a result of the influential "Tuskegee Machine" led by Washington, Harrison lost his postal job. The sequence of events involved Charles W. Anderson, a prominent Black Republican, Emmett Scott, Washington's assistant, and Edward M. Morgan, the New York Postmaster.

== Socialism ==
Harrison was an early advocate of the Georgist economic philosophy and later clarified that he had believed Georgism was the same thing as socialism. In 1911, after his postal firing, Harrison began full-time work with the Socialist Party of America and became America's leading Black Socialist. He lectured widely against capitalism, campaigned for the party presidential candidate Eugene V. Debs in 1912, and founded the Colored Socialist Club (the Socialist's first effort at reaching African Americans). He developed two important and pioneering theoretical series on "The Negro and Socialism" for the socialist newspaper the New York Call and for the socialist monthly International Socialist Review. In these articles Harrison outlined a materialist analysis of racism, arguing that it resulted from "the fallacy of economic fear" and economic competition, and that capitalists had an interest in maintaining economic discrimination based on racism, as "they can always use it as a club for the other workers". He maintained that it was the principal "duty" of the Socialists to "champion the cause of the African American and that the Socialists should undertake special efforts to reach African Americans as they had done with foreigners and women." Perhaps most importantly, he emphasized that "Politically, the Negro is the touchstone of the modern democratic idea" and that true democracy and equality implies "a revolution... startling even to think of."

Harrison moved to the left in the Socialist Party. He supported the socialistic, egalitarian, and militantly radical Industrial Workers of the World (IWW). He was a prominent speaker along with IWW leaders Bill Haywood, Elizabeth Gurley Flynn, Carlo Tresca, and Patrick Quinlan at the historic 1913 Paterson Silk Strike of 1913. He also supported IWW advocacy of direct action and sabotage. He commended the interracial, IWW-influenced, Brotherhood of Timber Workers efforts in the Deep South.

Despite his efforts, Socialist Party practice and positions included segregated locals in the South and racist positions on Asian immigration. Harrison's position in the Party was also affected by his alignment with its left-wing and the IWW, who were engaged in factional struggle with its right-wing faction: many leftists exited after Haywood (who had been a member of the SPA's executive committee) was expelled from the Party in 1912. The Socialist Party of New York was led by Morris Hillquit, a prominent figure on the right, and party leaders in New York City began restricting Harrison's activities, including preventing his own branch from having him as a speaker. Harrison concluded that Socialist Party leaders, like organized labor, put the white "Race first and class after". After writing a note to the NYC executive committee telling it to "go chase itself", he was suspended from the Party for three months: he resigned from the Socialist Party in 1918, before his suspension was over, but was periodically referred to as a socialist by others for years afterwards. After resigning from the Socialist Party, Harrison increased his activism within the 1920s Single-Tax movement.

== Race radicalism and the New Negro Movement ==
In 1914–15, after withdrawing from the Socialist Party, Harrison began work with freethinkers, the freethought/anarchist-influenced Modern School Movement (started by the martyred Spanish anarchist/educator Francisco Ferrer), and his own Radical Forum. He also spoke widely on topics such as birth control, evolution, literature, nonbelief, and the racial aspects of World War I. His outdoor talks and free speech efforts were instrumental in developing a Harlem tradition of militant street corner oratory. He paved the way for those who followed, including A. Philip Randolph, Marcus Garvey, Richard B. Moore, and (later) Malcolm X.

In 1915–16, after a New York Age editorial by James Weldon Johnson praised his street lectures, Harrison decided to concentrate his work in Harlem's Black community. He wrote reviews on the developing Black Theatre and the pioneering Lafayette Players of the Lafayette Theatre (Harlem). He emphasized how the "Negro Theater" helped express the psychology of the "Negro" and how it called attention to color consciousness within the African-American community.

In response to the "white first" attitude of the organized labor movement and the Socialists, Harrison provided a "race first" political perspective. He founded the "New Negro Movement", as a race-conscious, internationalist, mass-based, radical movement for equality, justice, opportunity, and economic power. This "New Negro" movement laid the basis for the Garvey movement. It encouraged mass interest in literature and the arts, and paved the way for publication of Alain Locke's well-known The New Negro eight years later. Harrison's mass-based political movement was noticeably different from the more middle-class and apolitical movement associated with Locke.

In 1917, African Americans and others were asked to fight overseas in World War I to "Make the World Safe for Democracy" even though, as Harrison pointed out, lynchings, racial segregation, and discrimination persisted at home. For that reason, he opposed U.S. involvement in the war, which brought him in conflict with W. E. B. Du Bois. In that same year, Harrison founded the Liberty League and the Voice: A Newspaper for the New Negro, as a radical alternative to the National Association for the Advancement of Colored People (NAACP). The Liberty League aimed at the Black masses beyond "The Talented Tenth". Its program advocated internationalism, political independence, and class and race consciousness. It called for full equality, federal anti-lynching legislation, enforcement of the Fourteenth and Fifteenth Amendments, labor organizing, support for socialist and anti-imperialist causes, armed self-defense, and mass-based political efforts. Meanwhile, the Voice achieved circulation of up to 10,000 per issue, however it ceased publication in November 1917 after five months, after refusing to accept advertising for products Harrison felt were damaging to racial pride such as hair straighteners and skin lighteners, and due to poor financial management. Harrison pointed to Ireland and the Irish Home Rule movement as an example to emulate.

In 1918, Harrison briefly served as an organizer for the American Federation of Labor (AFL). He chaired the Negro-American Liberty Congress (co-headed by William Monroe Trotter). The latter was the major wartime protest effort of African Americans. The Liberty Congress pushed demands against discrimination and racial segregation in the United States. It submitted a petition to the U. S. Congress for federal anti-lynching legislation, which the NAACP did not demand at that time. Harrison commented on domestic and international aspects of the war, writing: "During the war the idea of democracy was widely advertised, especially in the English-speaking world, mainly as a convenient camouflage behind which competing imperialists masked their sordid aims... [however] those who so loudly proclaimed and formulated the new democratic demands never had the slightest intention of extending the limits or the applications of 'democracy'."

The autonomous Liberty Congress effort was undermined by the U.S. Army's anti-radical Military Intelligence Bureau (MIB) in a campaign that included NAACP leader Joel E. Spingarn (a Major in Military Intelligence) and W. E. B. Du Bois (who applied for a Captaincy in Military Intelligence). The Liberty Congress protest efforts in wartime can be seen as precursors to the A. Philip Randolph-led March on Washington Movement during World War II, and to the Randolph and Martin Luther King Jr.-led March on Washington for Jobs and Freedom during the Vietnam War.

In 1919, Harrison edited the monthly New Negro magazine, which was "intended as an organ of the international consciousness of the darker races--especially of the Negro race". Harrison's concentration on international matters continued. Over the next several years, he wrote many powerful pieces critical of imperialism and supportive of internationalism. His writings and talks over his last decade revealed a deep understanding of developments in India, China, Africa, Asia, the Islamic world, and the Caribbean. Harrison repeatedly began his analysis of contemporary situations from an international perspective. Though a strong advocate of armed self-defense for African Americans, he also praised the mass-based non-violent efforts of Mohandas K. Gandhi.

== The Garvey Movement ==
In January 1920, Harrison became principal editor of the Negro World, the newspaper of Marcus Garvey's Universal Negro Improvement Association (UNIA). Over the next eight months, he developed it into the leading race-conscious, radical and literary publication of the day. By the August 1920 UNIA convention, Harrison had grown increasingly critical of Garvey. Harrison criticized Garvey for exaggerations, financial schemes, and a desire for an empire. In contrast to Garvey, Harrison emphasized that African Americans' principal struggle was in the United States, not in Africa. Harrison did however contribute to the UNIA's 1920 "Declaration of the Negro Peoples of the World". Though Harrison continued to write for the Negro World into 1922, he looked to develop political alternatives to Garvey.

== Later years ==
In the 1920s, after breaking with Garvey, Harrison continued public speaking, writing, and organizing. He lectured on politics history, science, literature, social sciences, international affairs, and the arts for the New York City Board of Education, and was one of the first to use radio to discuss topics in which he had expertise. In early July 1923, he spoke on "The Negro and The Nation" over New York station WEAF. His book and theater reviews and other writings appeared in many of the leading periodicals of the day—including The New York Times, New York Tribune, Pittsburgh Courier, Chicago Defender, Amsterdam News, New York World, Nation, New Republic, Modern Quarterly, Boston Chronicle, and Opportunity magazine. He openly criticized the Ku Klux Klan and the racist attacks of the Tulsa race massacre of 1921. He worked with various groups, including the Virgin Island Congressional Council, the Democratic Party, the Farmer-Labor Party, the single tax movement inspired by Henry George, the American Friends Service Committee, the Urban League, the American Negro Labor Congress, and the Workers (Communist) Party (the name at that time of the Communist Party USA).

In 1924, Harrison founded the International Colored Unity League (ICUL), which was his most broadly unitary effort. The ICUL urged Black people to develop "race consciousness" as a defensive measure—to be aware of their racial oppression and to use that awareness to unite, organize, and respond as a group. The ICUL program sought political rights, economic power, and social justice; urged self-reliance, self-sufficiency, and cooperative efforts; and called for the founding of "a Negro state" in the U.S. (not in Africa, as Garvey advocated). In 1927 Harrison edited the ICUL's Voice of the Negro until shortly before his death that year.

In his last lecture, Harrison told his listeners that he had appendicitis and would be getting surgery. Afterwards, he said he would be giving another lecture. He died on the operating table, at the age of 44.

== Intellectual and educational work ==
Harrison's appeal was both mass and individual. His race-conscious mass appeal utilized newspapers, popular lectures, and street-corner talks. This was in contrast to the approaches of Booker T. Washington, who relied on white patrons and a Black political machine, and W. E. B. Du Bois, who focused on the "Talented Tenth of the Negro Race". Harrison's appeal (later identified with that of Garvey) was aimed directly at the masses. His class- and race-conscious radicalism, though neglected at some periods, laid out the contours of much subsequent debate and discussion of African-American social activists. It is being increasingly studied.

For many years after his 1927 death, Harrison was much neglected. However, recent scholarship on Harrison's life and the Columbia University Library's acquisition of his papers show renewed interest. Columbia published the "Hubert H. Harrison Papers, 1893–1927: Finding Aid", and plans to make Harrison's writings available on the internet. The forthcoming Columbia University Press two-volume Harrison biography also reflects the growing interest in Harrison's life and thought.

== Legacy and honors ==
Biographer Jeffrey B. Perry writes that, among the African-American leaders of his era, Harrison was "the most class conscious of the race radicals and the most race conscious of the class radicals." Perry emphasized that Harrison was a key unifying figure between two major trends of African-American struggle—the labor/civil rights trend (identified with Randolph and Owen, and later with Martin Luther King Jr.) and the race/nationalist trend (identified with Garvey, and later with Malcolm X).

Harrison has been described as "the most distinguished, if not the most well-known, Caribbean radical in the United States in the early twentieth century" by historian Winston James.

As an intellectual, Harrison was a prominent soapbox orator, a lecturer for the New York City Board of Education's "Trend of the Times" series, an influential writer, and, the first Black person to write regularly published book reviews in history. His efforts in these areas were lauded by both black and white writers, intellectuals, and activists such as Eugene O'Neill, James Weldon Johnson, Henry Miller,and Hodge Kirnon. Harrison aided Black writers and artists, including Charles Gilpin, Andy Razaf, Eubie Blake, Walter Everette Hawkins, Claude McKay, Solomon Tshekisho Plaatje,and Augusta Savage. He was also a participant in the freethought and birth control movements as well as being a bibliophile and library popularizer. He created "Poetry for the People" columns in various publications, including the New Negro magazine (1919), Garvey's Negro World (1920), and the International Colored Unity League's The Voice of the Negro (1927).

A sampling of his varied work and poetry appears in the edited collection A Hubert Harrison Reader (2001). His collected writings are found in the Hubert H. Harrison Papers (which also contain a Finding Aid) at the Rare Book and Manuscript Library of Columbia University. Other writings appear in his books The Negro and the Nation (1917) and When Africa Awakes. Jeffrey B. Perry wrote a two-volume biography of Harrison. The first volume, Hubert Harrison: The Voice of Harlem Radicalism, 1883–1918, was published by Columbia University Press in November 2008 (an excerpt is available online).

In 2005, Columbia University's Rare Book and Manuscript Library acquired Harrison's papers. They were made available in digitized form through Columbia's Digital Library Collections website in 2020.

== Works ==
- Harrison, Hubert H. (2001). Perry, Jeffrey Babcock (ed.). A Hubert Harrison Reader. Wesleyan University Press.
- "Hubert H. Harrison Papers, 1893–1927: Finding Aid", Rare Book and Manuscript Library, Columbia University. A list of Harrison's writings available at Columbia. On Columbia's acquisition of the Papers see "Rare Book and Manuscript Library Acquires the Papers of Hubert Harrison". The Father of Harlem Radicalism", Columbia University Library News. Columbia also plans to put Harrison's Writings online.
- Harrison, Hubert H., "A Negro on Chicken Stealing", Letter to the editor, The New York Times, December 11, 1904, p.6.
- Harrison, Hubert, The Black Man's Burden [1915].
- Harrison, Hubert H., The Negro and Nation (New York: Cosmo-Advocate Publishing Company, 1917).
- Harrison, Hubert, "On A Certain Condescension in White Publishers", Negro World, March 1922.
- Harrison, Hubert H., When Africa Awakes: The "Inside Story" of the Stirrings and Strivings of the New Negro in the Western World (New York: Porro Press, 1920), New Expanded Edition, edited with notes and a new introduction by Jeffrey B. Perry (New York: Diasporic Africa Press, 2015).
