= Wilfred Adolphus Domingo =

Jamaican activist and journalist (1889–1968)

- Born: 26 November 1889; Kingston, Jamaica
- Died: 14 February 1968 (aged 78); New York City, New York
- Other name: W. A. Domingo
- Occupations: Journalist, activist
- Organization: Negro World (newspaper)
- Political party: Socialist Party, People's National Party

Wilfred Adolphus Domingo (W. A. Domingo) (26 November 1889 – 14 February 1968) was a Jamaican activist and journalist who became the youngest editor of Marcus Garvey's newspaper, the Negro World. As an activist and writer, Domingo travelled to the United States advocating for Jamaican sovereignty as a leader of the African Blood Brotherhood and the Harlem branch of the Socialist Party.

== Early life ==
Domingo was born in Kingston, Jamaica, the youngest son of a Jamaican mother and a Spanish father. Orphaned early, Domingo was brought up with his siblings by a maternal uncle and was educated at the Kingston Board School, an English-run colonial school specifically for the West Indies. On graduating, he worked as a tailor and began writing newspaper articles.

== Career ==
Domingo left Jamaica for the United States in 1910, settling initially in Boston before moving to New York in 1912. He originally planned on going to medical school, but he soon changed his course and became an activist, specifically focusing on advocating for constitutional changes in Jamaica. In 1913, Domingo embarked on a speaking tour to various places in the United States where he discussed his vision for reform and progress in Jamaica.

As a member of the Socialist Party, Domingo became involved with others in Harlem who shared similar political ideologies, such as the editors of The Messenger, A. Philip Randolph and Chandler Owen, who published critiques of Marcus Garvey's controversial ideology. Having met Marcus Garvey in 1915 through Jamaica's first nationalist political group, the National Club, Domingo introduced Garvey to figures such as Henry Rogowski, who was the printer for The Call. Thus, Garvey began his own newspaper, Negro World. Domingo was the founding editor of and a contributor to Negro World until 1919. Domingo and Garvey eventually had a falling out over the content of Domingo's writing, which often argued in favour of radical socialism, and which Garvey said was "not in keeping with the UNIA programme." Domingo himself was never a member of Garvey's UNIA. For that reason, Domingo was forced to resign as editor of the newspaper, but continued to write for the Black socialist press. A year later, Domingo and Richard B. Moore began a journal, The Emancipator, but only ten issues were published before its end.

As opposition grew for Marcus Garvey, Domingo at the time joined Cyril Briggs as a member of The African Blood Brotherhood and shared similar reservations for the direction of Garvey's leadership, a sentiment shared by the Black socialist press. Through the mid-1920s, the Black socialist press, particularly The Messenger and The Crisis, published scathing periodicals on Garvey, attacking his character and Caribbean background, to which led Domingo to terminate ties with The Messenger and its editors.

Through his role with Negro World, Domingo gained the attention of writer Alain Locke during the Harlem Renaissance, and eventually became a contributor to Locke's 1925 anthology The New Negro: An Interpretation. Domingo's essay "The Gift of the Black Tropics" gave an account of the sudden immigration of foreign-born Africans of the West Indies to Harlem during the early 1920s.

In 1936, Jamaican writer Walter Adolphe Roberts and Domingo created the Jamaica Progressive League, of which Domingo became the vice president. The League's most basic aims included establishing Jamaican self-governance, universal suffrage, and the right to form labour unions. They also encouraged their countrymen to study Jamaica's history and art in order to foster the desire for people to express themselves and their culture artistically. The League also argued against the establishment of the West Indies Federation.

Domingo traveled back to Jamaica in 1941, after 31 years of living in the United States. He was invited back to help expand the burgeoning People's National Party (PNP), a Jamaican political party with social-democratic views. While in this group, Domingo focused on organizing with others to establish Jamaican self-governance. However, upon Domingo's arrival to Jamaica in 1941, Sir Arthur Richards, the governor, had ordered that Domingo and several others be detained for 20 months due to them being "considered threats to the peace and security of the country." Domingo's detention was protested by organizations both inside and outside of Jamaica, including the American Civil Liberties Union.

Domingo returned to New York in 1947, where he continued to fight against the federation of Caribbean nations and fight for Jamaican independence. He stayed involved with Jamaica's diaspora community and politics up until his death.

== Legacy ==
In 1968, Domingo died in New York City, having suffered a stroke four years earlier in 1964. He is buried at Woodlawn Cemetery in the Bronx. There are no monuments to his memory or work in Jamaica today.

== Works ==
=== "What Are We, Negroes or Colored People?" (1919) ===
Taken from The Messenger, Domingo presents an argument in which he favours the racial descriptor of "Negro" over "Colored" in describing an individual of African descent. He discusses the historical and racial implications of each term to support his claim that adopting "Negro" as the more appropriate descriptor is more accurate, inclusive, and historically significant.

=== "Socialism, The Negroes' Hope" (1919) ===
Also written for The Messenger, this essay written by Domingo functions as an appeal to Black people in the Western world to embrace socialism. Domingo states that if Black people can accept Christianity, so too should they accept socialism, "which intends to do for human beings what Christianity promises to do for them in less material regions." Domingo also criticizes Western Black leaders who encourage the Black proletariat to engage in capitalist institutions, which Domingo argues are their downfall. He ends his essay by urging Black people of the West to get behind an international proletariat revolution.

=== "Gift of The Black Tropics" (1925) ===
Writing for Alain Locke's The New Negro, Domingo used this essay to discuss the relationship between native-born Black Harlemites and foreign-born Black Harlemites, as well as the unique contributions from foreign-born Black Harlemites to their community. Domingo stated that, in 1920, about 20 percent of the Black population in New York City consisted of Black immigrants. At the time when he was writing this essay, Domingo believed that about 35,000 of these Black immigrants resided in Harlem. He characterized the foreign-born Harlem population, of which he was a part, as frugal, hard-working, and refusing to conform to the ways of native-born Black Americans. Additionally, Domingo compared foreign- and native-born Black folks in terms of their political and religious beliefs, contributions to the Harlem community, and feelings surrounding the color line. Domingo stated that since colorism was a much smaller part of life in the Caribbean than in America, foreign-born Black folks were more likely to reject conforming to expectations set by the color line and instead blaze trails in predominantly white spaces. This essay situates how the intersections of racism, colorism, sexism, classism, and xenophobia affected the lives of Harlem's Black population in the 1920s.

=== "British West Indian Federation: A Critique" (1956) ===
In a stand-alone critique on the West Indian Federation, Domingo argued against final ratification of the federation which was to take place in 1958. Domingo stated that the federation is ultimately unfair because no public debate against the federation was allowed or acknowledged, and those in favour of federation were in control of the media and pushed pro-federation propaganda. He argued that neither race, nor geography, nor culture, nor history, nor economics justified a federation of the nations of the Caribbean. Domingo contended that the nations in the Caribbean lack the oneness that the British Government was trying to place on them; he said that England saw the people of the Caribbean as simply "West Indians", rather than as Jamaicans, Haitians, Trinidadians, Barbadians, and so forth. Finally, Domingo claimed that federation of the West Indies would ultimately benefit the British Government the most, and that those who would be most negatively affected by the federation had no say in the decision to federate.
