= Richard B. Moore =

Barbadian writer and activist (1893–1978)

Richard Benjamin Moore (9 August 1893 – 1978) was a Barbados-born Afro-Caribbean civil rights activist, writer and prominent socialist. He was also one of the earliest advocates of the term African American, as opposed to Negro or "black".

== Early life ==
Richard Benjamin Moore was born on 9 August 1893 in Barbados, West Indies, to Richard Henry Moore and Josephine Thorne Moore. In Barbados, the family was considered to be in the middle class regarding socioeconomic status. Richard Henry Moore the family's moneymaker, worked as a preacher and building contractor in Barbados. Richard B. Moore's mother died when he was three years old. Moore's father later remarried Elizabeth Mclean and soon died in 1902 when the young Richard was nine years old. With both biological parents dead, Moore was raised by his stepmother, Elizabeth Mclean.

Mclean wanted to carry out Richard Sr.'s wishes of giving Richard the best education, so she aided Richard in traveling to the United States. Moore migrated to the United States and arrived in New York City on 4 July 1909. However, Moore would not become a naturalized citizen until 11 September 1924. Although African Americans were free in the United States, they were far from being treated equally to European-Americans. Moore immediately faced ethnic discrimination regarding employment and educational opportunities. Although trained in Barbados to do clerical work, he was forced to turn to other jobs such as an elevator operator and work in a silk manufacturing firm.

== Political activism ==
The struggles that Moore encountered and observed made him become a strong advocate for the rights of African Americans. In 1919, he joined the African Blood Brotherhood (ABB), which was an organization formed to defend African Americans from race riots and lynching. Moore, along with other African-American advocates, joined the Socialist Party in the early 1920s. Moore joined the Socialist Party, partly because the Socialist Party was then transforming itself into a force to fight against segregation.

Moore was a frequent political candidate of the Communist Party. In 1928, he ran for the US Congress in New York's 21st congressional district. In 1934, Moore ran on the Socialist ticket for Chief Judge of the New York Court of Appeals. In 1935, he became the organizer for the International Labor Defense in the New England Territory. He used his position in that organization to speak on behalf of the Scottsboro Boys, a case in which nine young African-American males were accused of raping two young European-American women.

In 1942, Moore was expelled from the Communist Party because he was accused of being an African-American nationalist and kept African-American issues on the front burner.

He continued his efforts for equal rights in America. He also played a leading role in Caribbean advocacy groups. Moore, like his friend Hubert Harrison, was a bibliophile, collecting over 15,000 books and pamphlets on the African-American experiences worldwide. That collection of books is currently housed in a library that Moore developed in Barbados. Moore also ran the Frederick Douglass Book Center in Harlem.

Moore wrote a few books himself, including The Name "Negro": Its Origin and Evil Use (1960) and Caribs, Cannibals and Human Relations (1972). He also had essays and articles published in various magazines and journals, including the Negro Champion, Daily Worker, and Freedomways.

== Death ==
Moore died in his homeland of Barbados in 1978, at the age of 85.
