= Lovett Fort-Whiteman =

American communist activist (1889–1939)

- Fort-Whiteman at the founding of the ANLC, 1925.
- Born: December 3, 1889; Dallas, Texas, United States
- Died: January 13, 1939 (aged 49); Kolyma, Siberia, Soviet Union
- Cause of death: Malnutrition while imprisoned in gulag
- Occupations: Political activist, Communist International functionary

Lovett Huey Fort-Whiteman (3 December 1889 – 13 January 1939) was an American political activist and functionary for the Communist International (Comintern).

The first African American to attend a Comintern training school in the Soviet Union in 1924, Fort-Whiteman was later named the first national organizer of the American Negro Labor Congress, a mass organization (front group) of the Communist Party USA. Fort-Whiteman was once called "the reddest of the blacks" by Time magazine.

Fort-Whiteman was accused of being a Trotskyist and died of malnutrition while imprisoned in a gulag in the Soviet Union.

== Biography ==
=== Early years ===
Lovett Huey Fort-Whiteman was born in Dallas, Texas on December 3, 1889. His father, Moses Whiteman, was born into slavery in South Carolina and relocated to Texas at some time prior to 1887, where he worked as a janitor and a small scale cattle rancher. At the age of 35, Moses Whiteman married the 15-year-old Elizabeth Fort. Lovett was the first of the couple's children.

Fort-Whiteman received a better education than was common for many African American children of the era in the Dallas public schools, attending one of the few high schools in the American South in that day open to black attendance. Following graduation from high school, Fort-Whiteman enrolled at the Tuskegee Institute in Tuskegee, Alabama, probably about 1906, from which he graduated as a machinist.

Following completion of his studies at Tuskegee, Fort-Whiteman gained admission to Meharry Medical College in Nashville, Tennessee, with a view to becoming a doctor, but he did not complete the course of studies at that institution.

By 1910, his father having died, Fort-Whiteman had moved with his mother and younger sister to the Harlem area of New York City, where he worked as a hotel bellman to support the family while harboring dreams of becoming a professional actor.

=== Mexican years ===
Soon abandoning his dramatic ambitions, Fort-Whiteman next spent two or three years in the Yucatán Peninsula of Mexico, where he worked as an accounting clerk for a rope manufacturer, gaining fluency in the Spanish language and studying the rudiments of French.

Fort-Whiteman was deeply inspired by the Mexican Revolution which swept the Yucatán in the spring of 1915, advancing a reform program over the staunch opposition of wealthy landowners and the Catholic church. He became a committed adherent to the idea of radical transformation of society through trade unions, syndicalism, as a member of an organization called Casa del Obrero Mundial (House of the World Worker, or COM). When the COM attempted to further deepen the nature of the revolution by launching a strike against the new government of Yucatán, it was destroyed in the aftermath.

In 1917, Fort-Whiteman left Yucatán as a sailor bound first for Havana, Cuba before proceeding to Halifax, Nova Scotia, Canada. He disembarked there and made his way to the city of Montreal, adopting the pseudonym "Harry W. Fort" and discreetly reentering the United States under the guise of a railroad dining car waiter.

=== Radical activism in New York City ===
Back in New York City, Fort-Whiteman became well acquainted with leading black socialists A. Philip Randolph and Chandler Owen, publishers of the magazine The Messenger. He enrolled for courses at the Rand School of Social Science, a socialist school operated by the Socialist Party of America, joining the party himself. While at the Rand School Fort-Whiteman met others who would become prominent in the world radical movement in ensuing years, including Japanese émigré Sen Katayama and Otto Huiswoud, a recent transplant from British Guiana.

Picking up the pen as the new "Dramatic Editor" of The Messenger in 1918, Fort-Whiteman was among those at the epicenter of the Harlem Renaissance, a multi-faceted and dynamic black cultural movement dedicated to artistic and political development of the so-called "New Negro". Fort-Whiteman even tried his hand as a writer, publishing two works of fiction in The Messenger provocatively dealing with interracial romantic relations.

In this period Fort-Whiteman also met anarchist cartoonist Robert Minor, another Texan. In 1918, Minor had visited the Soviet Union, where he had seen the Bolshevik Revolution at close quarters. Fort-Whiteman followed his friend into the Communist Labor Party of America shortly after the time of its formation in September 1919.

In October 1919, Fort-Whiteman was arrested in St. Louis speaking to a small gathering attended by a handful of party members infiltrated by an informer from military intelligence. As a prominent black communist agitator, Fort-Whiteman came under close scrutiny from the Bureau of Investigation as a "dangerous agitator." Fort-Whiteman was charged with violation of the Espionage Act for having explicitly advocated "resistance to the United States" — although Fort-Whiteman denied ever having used such a phrase in his St. Louis speech. He ultimately remained in jail for months after his arrest but seems to have escaped a lengthy prison term.

=== Black communist leader ===
From 1920 to 1922, the American communist movement eked out a covert, underground existence, with Fort-Whiteman presumably retaining party membership through the succession of mergers and splits which ensued. He reemerged in the public eye in February 1923 as a member of the editorial staff of The Messenger, although his affiliation with the Workers Party of America (WPA), a legal communist organization established around the beginning of 1922, seems to have remained an unpublicized fact. Fort-Whiteman only publicly acknowledged his communist affiliation in January 1924 with the publication of an article in The Daily Worker, official English-language newspaper of the WPA.

In February 1924, Fort-Whiteman was tapped as one of 250 delegates to the "Negro Sanhedrin", a Chicago convention dedicated to issues of concern to black members of the working class, in which the WPA played a significant organizing role through its New York-based affiliate, the African Blood Brotherhood (ABB), headed by Cyril Briggs Fort-Whiteman served as speaker for the WPA/ABB caucus and forwarded the organization's program, calling for an end to racial segregation in housing, binding contracts to protect tenant farmers, an end to colonialism in Africa, and US government recognition of the Soviet Union.

During the 1920s, a so-called "Great Migration" of African Americans moving from the South to urban centers of the Northern United States took place. The American communist movement sought to capitalize upon the health and safety problems which ensued, initiating a short-lived mass organization (front group) known as the Negro Tenants Protective League to agitate for rent strikes and other forms of activity as a means of spurring change. Fort-Whiteman, by then a top leader of the Communist Party in its "Negro work," addressed the founding convention of this group in Chicago on March 31, 1924 along with other top-level Workers Party officials, including Robert Minor and Otto Huiswoud.

=== American Negro Labor Congress ===
In the spring of 1925, Fort-Whiteman joined his Workers Party comrades Otto Hall and Otto Huiswoud as one of 17 black signatories of an official call for establishment of the American Negro Labor Congress (ANLC). Established by the Communist Party as a successor organization to the now moribund African Blood Brotherhood, the ANLC was founded by a convention of 500 men and women in Chicago late in October of that year. Delegates attending this founding congress included substantial numbers of representatives of trade unions and sundry community organizations as well as unaffiliated working-class people rather than members of the so-called "Negro intelligentsia." In the words of one historian, the bulk of these founding delegates were "the sorts of blacks the Communists felt the NAACP and Urban League forgot."

The short-lived success of the founding convention of the ANLC was largely a product of Fort-Whiteman's initiative. Chosen as the head of the Provisional Organizing Committee of the ANLC, Fort-Whiteman had traveled across the South and Northeast speaking to countless black community groups attempting to persuade them to support the new effort, arguing that a new organization was essential in order to "present the cause of the Negro worker." His successful organizing effort gained national notoriety for Fort-Whiteman, with Time magazine deeming Fort-Whiteman to be "the reddest of the blacks."

=== Move to USSR ===
Fort-Whiteman moved to the Soviet Union in about 1927, joining the tiny African American community in Moscow. He lived with his wife Marina, a Jewish chemist, in a small apartment. He was a close friend of African American journalist Homer Smith Jr. In 1928, Fort-Whiteman was a delegate to the 6th World Congress of the Communist International. In the Comintern debates of 1928, Fort-Whiteman supported the positions of Bukharin and American leader Jay Lovestone, arguing against the need for the existence of the ANLC.

He was later hired by the English-language Moscow News as a contributor and worked as a teacher at an English-language school in Moscow. He was a consulting screenwriter on the 1932 production Black and White.

=== Arrest and death ===
Early in 1937, a massive campaign of arrests and punishments of alleged spies, saboteurs, and disloyal individuals was initiated by the Soviet secret police, targeting especially Communist Party members and economic leaders. Lovett Fort-Whiteman applied for permission to return home to the United States at this time—a request which was refused. Three weeks later, Fort-Whiteman was denounced for having expressed "counterrevolutionary" sentiments and on July 1, 1937 was sentenced to five years internal exile. He was first sent to Semipalatinsk, Kazakhstan, where he worked for a time as a teacher.

Lovett Fort-Whiteman was identified as a Trotskyist in internal CPUSA documents. A report from the mid-1930s on support for Trotsky within the party stated that "Lovett Fort-Whiteman, a Negro Comrade, showed himself for Trotsky." In a 1938 letter to Gosizdat, the CPUSA's Comintern representative Pat Toohey wrote, "Whiteman is a Trotskyist."

The terror continued to escalate into 1938 and on May 8, 1938, Fort-Whiteman's sentence was reviewed under the stricter article 58, specifically 58-2 and 58-6, of the criminal code of the Russian SFSR (for armed insurrection and espionage) and his sentence was amended to five years of hard labor in the notorious Gulag system of work camps. Fort-Whiteman was sent to Kolyma in Siberia, a particularly inhospitable part of the Soviet Far East. In Kolyma, Fort-Whiteman was imprisoned in one of the camps of the Camp Department of the Southern Mining and Industrial Administration, part of the Sevvostlag camp system run by the Dalstroy State Trust in the region surrounding Magadan. The camp department and camps under its management were tasked with the extraction of gold and tin ore in freezing subarctic conditions.

There the intentionally inadequate food supplied to the overworked camp inmates and savage winter weather sapped Fort-Whiteman's strength and the formerly robust man's health rapidly failed. According to an acquaintance of Robert Robinson, who saw Fort-Whiteman, he was severely beaten for failure to fulfill the work norms in the camp, and was "a broken man, whose teeth had been knocked out". On January 13, 1939, Lovett Fort-Whiteman died of illness related to malnutrition. He was 49 years old. According to the death certificate filled out at the Southern Mining Administration's Gulag hospital in Ust-Taezhny, Fort-Whiteman was most likely working at the Taezhnik mine.

Although Fort-Whiteman's death certificate was printed on letterhead belonging to the Camp Department of the Southern Mining and Industrial Administration, the need to increase production of tin led to reorganizations of the Sevvostlag organization structure in October 1938 that preceded Lovett's death and led to its reorganization into the Southwest Mining and Industrial Administration with its center in Ust-Utinaya. The Southwest Mining and Industrial Administration was responsible for the operation of a complex of camps, including Taezhnik in the village of Ust-Taezhny (Orotukan), where Lovett Fort-Whiteman died.

== Bibliography ==
- Gilmore, Glenda Elizabeth (2008). Defying Dixie: The Radical Roots of Civil Rights, 1919-1950. New York: W. W. Norton & Company. ISBN 978-0-393-06244-1.
- Solomon, Mark (December 1998). The Cry Was Unity: Communists and African Americans, 1917-1936. Jackson, MS: Univ. Press of Mississippi. ISBN 978-1-57806-095-5.
- Hutchinson, Earl Ofari (1995). Blacks and Reds: Race and Class in Conflict, 1919-1990. East Lansing, MI: Michigan State University Press. ISBN 978-0-87013-361-9 – via Internet Archive.
- Klehr, Harvey; Haynes, John Earl; Anderson, Kyrill M. (October 1, 2008). The Soviet World of American Communism. New Haven, Connecticut: Yale University Press. ISBN 978-0-300-13800-9 – via Internet Archive.
