= Otto Huiswoud =

Surinamese political activist

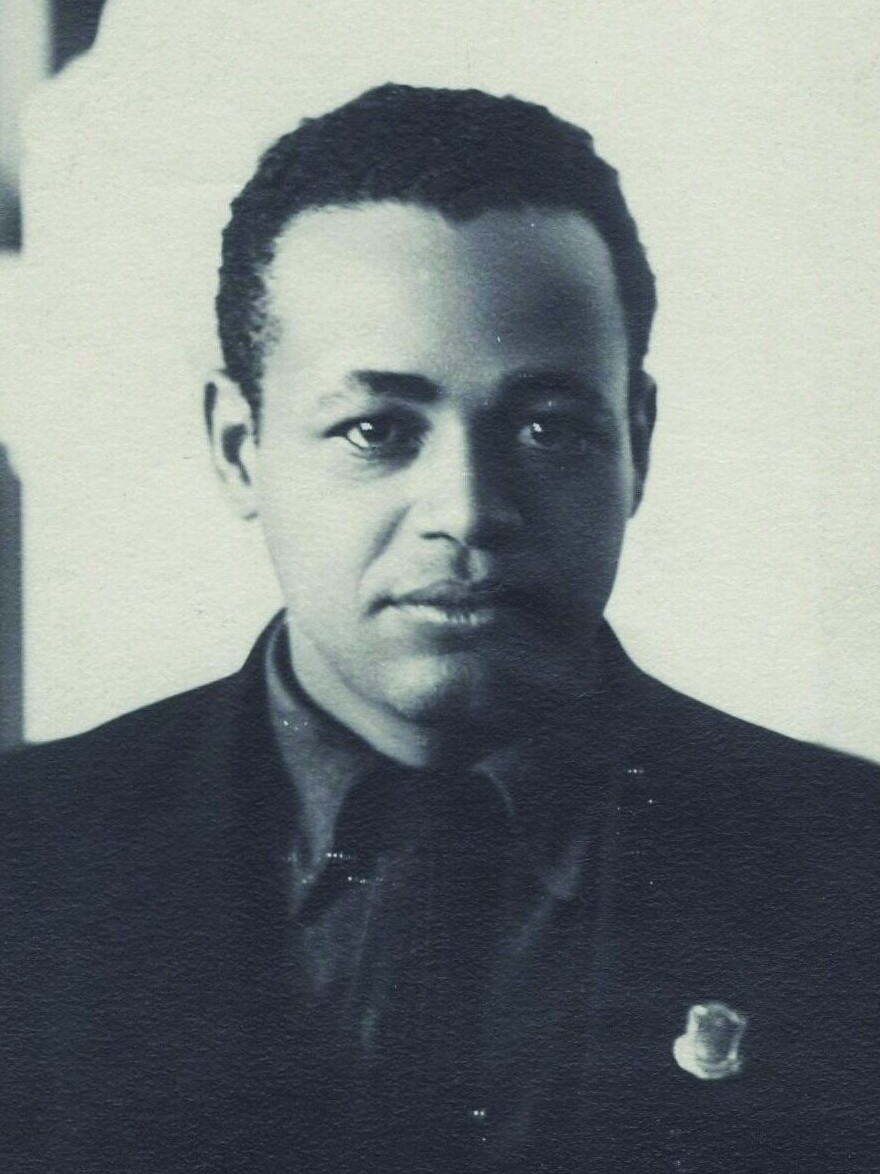
- Huiswoud in 1923
- Born: Otto Eduard Gerardus Majella Huiswoud; 28 October 1893; Paramaribo, Suriname
- Died: 20 February 1961 (aged 67); Amsterdam, Netherlands
- Occupation: Political activist
- Political party: Communist Party USA
- Spouse: Hermina Huiswoud (m. 1926)

Otto Eduard Gerardus Majella Huiswoud (October 28, 1893 – February 20, 1961) was a Surinamese political activist who was a charter member of the Communist Party of America. Huiswoud is regarded as the first black member of the American communist movement. Huiswoud served briefly as the Communist Party's representative to the Executive Committee of the Communist International in 1922 and was a leading black Comintern functionary during the decade of the 1920s.

== Biography ==
=== Early years ===
Otto E. Huiswoud was born October 28, 1893, in Paramaribo, a South American coastal city in what was then the Dutch colony of Surinam and is today the capital of the independent country of Suriname. He was the son of Rudolf Huiswoud, a former slave who had gained his freedom as a boy of 11 and who learned the skills of a tailor, working at the trade until his death in 1920. His mother, Jacqueline Bernard Huiswoud, originally hailed from the island of Curaçao. Otto was the fifth child and the second son in a family of eight siblings.

As a boy Otto was educated in Roman Catholic schools, with the educational system of the day conducted in the Dutch language and compulsory for children aged 7 to 12. Otto remained in school for five years, gaining exposure during this time not only to Dutch, but also the French and German languages.

During his school years Huiswoud participated in the Roman Catholic Church on Sundays as an altar boy. After school he worked as an apprentice to a carpenter.

Following completion of his education, Otto began a second apprenticeship, this time working under a printer. Huiswoud was unhappy with his lot in life as a printer's apprentice, however, so in January 1910 the 16-year-old convinced his father to allow him to depart to see the world and he shipped out on a banana boat bound for the Netherlands.

Due to the abysmal working conditions on board, Huiswoud and two of his Surinamese mates decided to jump ship when it was docked in New York. He settled in Brooklyn, where he made ends meet by working at various jobs as a printer, cook, and janitor.

=== Early political career ===
In New York, Huiswoud was exposed to soapbox speakers in Union Square, where he was introduced to socialist arguments and literature for the first time. By 1916, he had become a member of the Socialist Party of America (SPA), participating actively in the Young People's Socialist League at Cornell University in Ithaca, New York, where he studied agriculture. Huiswoud would later also become a member of the Socialist Propaganda League, a revolutionary socialist organization which included the influential socialist writer S. J. Rutgers, a Dutch civil engineer who had previously worked in the Dutch East Indies.

During the summer of 1918, Huiswoud took a job working on a pleasure boat that was part of the Fall River Line. Black crew members were not organized by the International Seamen's Union, so Huiswoud took it upon himself to lead a walkout that led the company to negotiate for better pay and improved working conditions for its minority workers. News of the young leader of this Boston strike reached Socialist Party leaders, who offered Huiswoud a one-year scholarship to attend the Rand School of Social Science, the SPA's training school for party activists and trade union workers. Huiswoud accepted this offer and did not return to Cornell.

Between his attendance of the Rand School and his participation in the 21st Assembly Branch of the SPA, located in Harlem, Huiswoud made the acquaintance of a number of influential figures in the history of American radicalism, including Japanese expatriate Sen Katayama—later a high-ranking functionary in the Communist International—trade unionist and newspaper editor A. Philip Randolph and his associate Chandler Owen, Richard B. Moore, Lovett Fort-Whiteman, Frank Crosswaith, and Edward Welsh.

Huiswoud found himself a supporter of the Left Wing Section of the Socialist Party during the acrimonious factional war of 1919. He was one of 94 delegates to the June 1919 National Conference of the Left Wing, which elected a governing Left Wing National Council and participated in the formation of the Communist Party of America on September 1 of that year. Although not a delegate to either founding convention, according to Comintern records Huiswoud's party membership dated to 1919, and he has been recognized by historians as the first black member of the American Communist Party.

Through his connection to the radical black political leaders of Harlem, Huiswoud eventually made his way to membership in the African Blood Brotherhood, a secret society established by Cyril Briggs to promote black liberation and self-defense against the Red Summer of 1919. Although an active participant in the organization, Huiswoud was not among the group's founders, Cyril Briggs himself later recalled.

In the summer of 1922, Huiswoud was chosen as the candidate of the Workers Party of America—the new "legal" political arm of what was then the underground Communist Party – as its candidate for the New York State Legislature in its 22nd Assembly District.

=== Comintern delegate ===
Huiswoud was an official delegate of the Workers Party of America to the 4th World Congress of the Comintern, held in Moscow from November 5 to December 5, 1922, attending its sessions together the Caribbean poet Claude McKay. Huiswoud addressed the assembled delegates on the situation facing black workers in the United States. Huiswoud was elected head of the Congress's Negro Commission and was instrumental in helping draft the thesis of the Comintern on the so-called "Negro Question" as well as four resolutions, all of which Huiswoud presented on the floor of the Congress.

Owing to his presence in Moscow, in the first week of December 1922 Huiswoud briefly served as the Communist Party's representative to the Communist International when their regularly elected "CI Rep," L. E. Katterfeld, who was out on bail regarding a political case started against him in 1920, was forced to rush home to the United States to appear in court.

=== Activity in the 1920s ===
Debate Otto Huiswoud & Marcus Garvey (Collection Black Archives, Amsterdam)

Huiswoud returned to America in 1923, entering the country on March 1 legally as a passenger on a ship called the Ryndam and being entered on the books as a permanent resident of the United States. Huiswoud was set to work as a functionary in the African Blood Brotherhood, by then a mass organization of the Communist Party targeted towards black workers. Huiswoud served as the National Organizing Secretary of the group until the termination of the organization.

In February 1924, Huiswood attended the so-called "Negro Sanhedrin," a national anti-racism conference, as one of two official delegates of the African Blood Brotherhood. The two ABB delegates were joined by five others representing the Workers Party of America.

In June 1924, Huiswoud was a delegate to the St. Paul Convention of the Farmer-Labor Party, an attempt by the Workers Party of America to create and harness a mass political organization including the organized labor movement and disaffected farmers. At this gathering Huiswoud proposed a resolution calling for full social equality for American blacks and an end to lynching. A white Texas farmer rose to oppose Huiswoud's proposal, declaring that American blacks did not truly desire social equality with caucasians, only material benefits. Huiswoud responded by taking to the floor to denounce the farmer, an action that threatened the fragile alliance that the communists were attempting to build and which was regarded as a serious breach of discipline. The affair ended with Huiswoud being quietly suspended from the Workers Party for one year.

In October 1925, the Workers Party launched a new organization directed at American blacks to replace the by now defunct African Blood Brotherhood. The party's best-regarded black activists, including Huiswoud, James W. Ford, Harry Haywood, Cyril Briggs, Richard B. Moore were put to work as functionaries of this new group, called the American Negro Labor Congress. The organization was headed by Lovett Fort-Whiteman, an individual with whom Huiswoud came into conflict, leading to Fort-Whiteman's ouster in 1927.

During the bitter internal factional war which consumed the Workers Party during the decade of the 1920s, Huiswoud was a consistent supporter of the New York-based faction of Charles Ruthenberg, John Pepper, and Jay Lovestone against the Midwest-based faction of William Z. Foster, James P. Cannon, and Alexander Bittelman. With the New York group in control of the party apparatus for most of this period, Huiswoud remained one of the organization's top-ranking black leaders.

In March 1929, Huiswoud was elected as a delegate to the 6th National Convention of the Communist Party, held in New York City. He was at that time the party's highest ranking black member, sitting on the governing Central Executive Committee and the Political Committee ("Polcom") which guided the party's day-to-day operations. Huiswoud additionally served as the Director of the Negro Department of the Communist Party at this time.

=== Return to Moscow ===
Following the 6th Convention, Huiswoud was chosen as one of ten delegates to travel to Moscow in support of National Secretary Jay Lovestone and his policies, which was under review by a special American Commission established by the Presidium of the executive committee of the Communist International. Although the delegates presented a united front arguing for a continuation of the Lovestone leadership, the powerful American Commission, which included such top Soviet leaders as Joseph Stalin, Vyacheslav Molotov, and Otto Kuusinen, ultimately decided to take decisive action against the factionalism which had plagued the American party throughout the decade of its existence by removing opposing factional leaders Lovestone and Alexander Bittelman and sending them to work in other communist parties abroad.

Lovestone refused to accept this decision and returned home without authorization, resulting in his expulsion from the Communist Party and his eventual formation of a rival organization, the Communist Party (Majority Group). Huiswoud, on the other hand, ultimately chose to accept the decisions of the Comintern and remained at its service.

In July 1928, the Red International of Labor Unions, the world communist movement's international trade union organization, had established a "Negro Section" dedicated to coordinating the activities of black workers from the Caribbean region and Sub-Saharan Africa. This would serve as the directing center for an organization called the International Trade Union Committee of Negro Workers (ITUCNW), established in Hamburg, Germany, in July 1930. Headed by Trinidadian George Padmore, Huiswoud was named the editor of the ITUCNW's monthly publication, The Negro Worker. Completing the core cadres of this Comintern initiative was the American-born James W. Ford, former vice presidential nominee of the Workers Party.

In 1933, The Negro Worker was headquartered in Hamburg. After the Nazi party came to power, Huiswoud moved to Copenhagen, Paris, the Netherlands and back to Paris. In 1941, he arrived in Suriname.

On January 31, 1941, Huiswoud was interned at Copieweg internment camp by Governor Johannes Kielstra as a communist propagandist. He was released on September 25, 1942, due to poor health and was not considered dangerous. In 1947, he moved to the Netherlands and worked for PTT, the Dutch telephone company. He was an active member of Vereniging Ons Suriname, an organisation to promote the interests of Surinamese people living in the Netherlands. In 1954, he became the chairperson of Vereniging Ons Suriname. The organisation was politically socialist, but less radical due to the moderating influence of Eddy Bruma and Jules Sedney. During Huiswoud's tenure they started to demand a dominion status for Suriname.

=== Death and legacy ===
Otto Huiswoud died February 20, 1961, in Amsterdam. He was 67 years old at the time of his death. Huiswoud's papers, archived under the name of his wife, Hermina "Hermie" Dumont Huiswoud, reside at the Tamiment Library at New York University in two archival boxes. Use of the collection is open to scholars without restriction.

== Publications ==
- "Dutch Guiana: A Study in Colonial Exploitation," The Messenger, vol. 2, no. 11 (1919), pp. 22–23.
- "The Negro and the Trade Unions," The Communist, vol. 8, no. 12 (December 1928), pp. 770–775.
- "World Aspects of the Negro Question," The Communist, vol. 9, no. 2 (February 1930), pp. 132–147.
- How to Organize and Lead the Struggles of the Negro Toilers. (As "Charles Woodson.") Copenhagen: International Trade Union Committee of Negro Workers, n.d. [c. 1935].

== See also ==
- African Blood Brotherhood
- American Negro Labor Congress
- Communist Party USA and African Americans
