= Sanhedrin (disambiguation) =

The Sanhedrin was an assembly of judges.

Sanhedrin may also be:

== Books ==
- Sanhedrin (Talmud), a tractate on criminal law

== Events ==
- Negro Sanhedrin, an assembly of representatives of African-American organizations held in Chicago from Feb. 11–15, 1924
- Grand Sanhedrin, an attempt by Napoleon Bonaparte, Emperor of the French to create a new council with the same legal standing as the original, in 1807
