= B. D. Amis =

African-American civil rights leader

- Born: Benjamin Dewayne Amis; July 7, 1896; Chicago, Illinois, U.S.
- Died: June 9, 1993 (aged 96)
- Occupations: CPUSA activist and politician

Benjamin DeWayne Amis (7 July 1896 – 9 June 1993), known as B. D. Amis, was an African-American labor organizer and civil rights leader. Particularly influential in the fight for African Americans and workers during the period of official segregation in the South and informal discrimination throughout the country, Amis is most remembered for his militant Communist activism on behalf of the notable legal cases of the falsely-accused Scottsboro Boys and the African-American organizer Angelo Herndon, as well as the white labor leader Tom Mooney.

== Biography ==
Born Benjamin DeWayne Amis in Chicago, Illinois, in 1896, Amis went by B. D. Amis throughout his life, although often signing his letters as "B. DeWayne Amis" in the 1930s. Growing up in the black neighborhoods of Chicago, B. D. Amis was strongly influenced by the anti-lynching writings of Ida B. Wells-Barnett, a Southern-born African-American journalist, civil rights leader, and women's rights activist then living in Chicago.

Politically involved since the early 1920s, by 1928, Amis was president of the National Association for the Advancement of Colored People's Peoria branch. The recently founded Communist Party, organized on a favorable position towards African Americans, provided an invitation to a meeting in New York City, which profoundly interested him as one of the few non-black organizations in the 1920s willing to seriously struggle against racism. Amis would soon be working with William Z. Foster, the party leader and presidential candidate, whom Amis would help renominate together with the African-American vice president nominee James W. Ford in 1932.

Amis began contributing to Party journals not long afterward. The 1930 "Lynch Justice" attacked the Communist Party's leftist opposition, the less radical Socialist Party, which, although progressive in relation to the idea of African-American equality in the northern states, had decided to abstain from taking a position on the rights of African Americans. Amis wrote:

The New Leader, official organ of the Socialist Party, states very plainly the position of the Party to the Negro masses. In the state convention at Virginia the Socialist misleaders of labor declared the racial problem most difficult to solve. "Almost all southerners believe in segregating the Negro and depriving him of social and political rights that whites enjoy. The southern Socialists must adjust their tactics to this state of affairs. The northern pamphlets, leaflets, and newspapers are frequently useless, if not harmful in the South...The Socialists of Virginia are good Socialists. . ." In this manner the Socialist Party solves the "difficult racial problem" by declaring that it must be solved in "Southern style." "Southern style" calls for lynching, segregation, mob terrorism, and the worst forms of persecution and extra exploitation of the Negro poor farmers and agricultural laborers.

From 1930, Amis headed the newly formed League of Struggle for Negro Rights, a radical organization formed on the basis of Leninist principles; although seeing black sovereignty in majority-black areas of the South as an ideal, given the fever-pitch racism then prevailing in the United States, the organization focused on publicizing the plight of the oppressed black minority through its newspaper, The Liberator, which B. D. Amis edited, and on promoting direct action protests against lynching, tenant evictions, and the Jim Crow segregation laws, as well as racism in the legal system and other manifestations. In 1933, the League issued a "Bill of Rights for the Negro People" – a document calling on Franklin Roosevelt to protect African Americans; a petition for action from the president was carried to Washington, D.C. by 3,500 activists.

In 1931 – almost right after Amis had completed writing "Lynching Justice" – the Scottsboro Boys case came to light in Alabama: nine young black men who had gotten into a fight with a group of white youth were subsequently charged with raping two white women. By sundown on the same day, a freshly formed lynch mob was demanding that the youths be surrendered to them for immediate lynching. Authorities pleaded against mob violence by promising speedy trials and asking "the Judge to send them to the chair"; fifteen days later, eight were sentenced to death, and the Communist Party managed to convince the parents of the minors to let International Labor Defense take charge of the defense. Deeply involved in the case, Amis travelled to Alabama. Amis' 1931 commentary about the case, juxtaposed against a set of photographs from Scottsboro, "They Shall Not Die! The Story of Scottsboro in Pictures" – published in the June 6 copy of The Liberator – served as a rallying cry for the accused defendants at the beginning of the trials.

B. D. Amis' son, Barry D. Amis, writes that

The party immediately recognized the significance of what was happening and acted swiftly to organize the defense for the nine accused youths through the International Labor Defense. . . "They shall not die!" spread not only throughout the United States, but across Europe as well.

Amis and Scottsboro historian William T. Howard write that Amis' article "gave the Party campaign its slogan," which spread far beyond both the Deep South and the United States. In addition to the coverage that the case received in the Soviet Union, where "the word 'Negro' was [at the time] synonymous with Scottsboro boys," Communist-organized protests were soon being arranged globally – far from the initial demonstrations organized in Harlem. William T. Howard writes that

Communists, black and white, participated in a host of protests against the Scottsboro verdicts...On May 16, six thousand workers paraded in a Harlem Scottsboro demonstration...on June 27, five thousand African American and white workers paraded through the streets of Harlem in a Scottsboro protest march. Internationally, on June 9, Scottsboro protests took place before the United States Legation at Riga, Latvia...On July 3, about 150,000 German workers filled the Lustgarten in Berlin and heard Mrs. Ada Wright pleas for the lives of her sons and the other Scottsboro defendants.

The Communists proceeded to appeal the case upward through the courts. Although the Scottsboro Boys, now considered entirely innocent of any charges, did serve time for their convictions after a subsequent retrial, their defense by the Communists succeeded in a number of pioneering ways, notably exposing for the entire nation the racism inherent in Alabama's court system. With ILD-hired attorney Sam Leibowitz embarrassing the Alabama prosecutors by noting in front of the Supreme Court that African Americans were entirely excluded from Alabama juries, the Alabama court system was forced to add one black man to the jury – though he was easily outvoted by the eleven white jurors, the event was the first time that the racial balance of the jurors was made an issue in the proceedings. Moreover, the post-retrial sentencing of the Scottsboro boys represented the first time that a black man had been sentenced to anything other than death in the rape of a white woman in Alabama. Sam Leibowitz and the Communist Party's ILD attorneys also succeeded in proving that the black names added to the roster of jurors for the review of the Supreme Court had been forged by the state. All of the boys managed to escape the death sentences originally handed out by the local Scottsboro, Alabama court; with international pressure mounting on the state, four were released as innocent of the charges as soon as the late 1930s.

As the campaign to secure the freedom of the accused Scottsboro Boys was being run, the jailing of Angelo Herndon, a teenaged African-American communist convicted of insurrection after attempting to organize black industrial workers in 1932 in Atlanta, Georgia, became another cause for fierce activism. Georgia authorities sought to make a case against Herndon based on his advocacy of communism: Herndon had led a racially integrated march of the unemployed in 1932 and was subsequently arrested when Georgia police found Communist Party literature in his bedroom. Amis, as leader of the League of Struggle for Negro Rights, participated in the campaign for Herndon's release, although the party's efforts were already heavily committed to the release of the nine Scottsboro teenagers.

Amis' other work for the Communist Party took him to various locations within the country. He went on to become District Organizer for the Communist Party in Cleveland. He also travelled outside the United States. He took advantage of the opportunity to study formally in the Soviet Union as well as to hone further organizing skills, and contributed writings to the Negro Worker, the newspaper of the International Trade Union Committee of Negro Workers while working abroad.

The 1930s also saw Amis engage in the campaign to free Tom Mooney, a militant white socialist labor leader whose jailing in the 1910s, like those of the African-American defendants, had been conducted in a lynch mob atmosphere – even as evidence against Mooney had also been faked and testimony against the activist would be revealed as perjured. In his capacity as a politician, Amis publicized the Mooney case among both black and white workers. Nominating William Z. Foster for presidential candidate during the Communist Party's Chicago convention in 1932, Foster's support for Mooney figured prominently in Amis' endorsement; Amis described Foster as "an outstanding fighter" for the freedom of Mooney as well as Edith Berkman and the Scottsboro Boys, "prov[ing] his ability to lead workers today in deadly struggle against war and capitalism" and showing "the revolutionary way out of the crisis."

Having moved to Pennsylvania in the 1930s, Amis ran a 1936 campaign for state general auditor and supported the Foster-Ford campaign in the national electoral race. His later activity included organizing the Catering Industry Employees Union, Local 758, an African-American local of the Hotel and Restaurant Employees and Bartenders International Union (AFL), serving as an elected officer of both unions in the later 1930s and early 1940s.

A longtime activist in Pennsylvania, Amis subsequently worked for the Gulf Oil Company, while continuing his radical union and community organizing activities.

Amis died in Alexandria, Virginia on June 9, 1993, thirty days before his 97th birthday – committed to his radical principles throughout his life.

Amis' son Barry D. Amis, a professor of education at Michigan State and Purdue universities, helped pioneer the development of African-American literature courses at Michigan State.

Amis' archive of papers and important documents, made public for the interests of general research by the Communist Party, is held at New York University's Tamiment Library.

== See also ==
- Civil rights movement (1896–1954)
- The Communist Party USA and African-Americans
