= ANLC =

ANLC may refer to:

- Alaska Native Language Center, an institute at the University of Alaska, Fairbanks
- American Negro Labor Congress (1925-1930), a mass organization of the Communist Party, USA
