= George Wells Parker =

African-American activist and journalist (1882–1931)

George Wells Parker

George Wells Parker (September 18, 1882 – July 28, 1931) was an African-American political activist, historian, public intellectual, and writer who co-founded the Hamitic League of the World.

== Biography ==
George Wells Parker's parents were born in Virginia and South Carolina, and his family moved to Omaha when Parker was young. While attending Omaha Central High School, he was recognized as a "leader among his classmates" who was a gifted speaker. In 1898, he competed in a national essay contest for high school and college students at the Trans-Mississippi and International Exposition and won top honors for an essay about history.

After leaving Central High School, he attended Howard University for a few years. Returning to Omaha, he studied medicine at Creighton University

In 1916, Parker started helping African Americans resettle in Omaha and, by 1917, he helped found the Hamitic League of the World to promote African pride and black economic progress. During this era, he was vice-president of the Omaha Philosophical Society, where he gave regular speeches about the history of African Americans.

He was a regular contributor and editor for The Monitor, a Black newspaper in Omaha. After leaving that paper under duress in 1921, he edited a Black newspaper called The New Era, which was short-lived.

In 1922, Parker moved to Chicago to pursue "Newspaper and magazine work" and died there almost a decade later, leaving a wife, two brothers and two sisters. He was buried by his family in an unmarked grave in Forest Lawn Cemetery in Omaha.

=== Mental health and murder of Celestine Jackson ===
Wells Parker struggled with mental health throughout his life. In 1905 the Duluth Evening Herald wrote, "human efforts to do something in the world rarely surpass the labors of George Wells Parker, a colored youth of 22, whose frenzy for knowledge and achievement left him a mental wreck." On December 25, 1911, George Wells Parker was taken into custody by St. Paul, Minnesota police because they believed he was insane, but county physician C. B. Telsberg ordered his release. The following day, Parker slashed Celestine Jackson, the proprietor of the boarding house where he was staying, to death with a razor. The St. Paul Appeal, an African American newspaper, called it "one of the most gruesome murders in the annals of the city" and noted "it is generally believed Parker was insane as there could not have been any motive for him to wreck such vengeance upon a woman in bed and practically helpless from paralysis." Likewise, the Twin City Star, which described Parker as "a cultured and well mannered [sic] young man, of respectable parentage," speculated that he had been driven mad by overwork and his fiancée breaking off their engagement. The Star also noted that Parker "was committed several years ago to an insane asylum in Omaha," though it is not clear if that refers to the 1905 incident. Parker was committed to a Minnesota home for the criminally insane in May 1912. He was released in 1914 when the superintendent of the facility certified that he was "fully recovered and his release will not endanger the lives of others."

== Theory ==
As a Black nationalist and contemporary of Marcus Garvey, Parker's views on Africa as the cradle of civilization foreshadowed increased fascination with Egyptian imagery by African Americans.

As a historian committed towards accelerating racial self-awareness, Parker's work called "for the revision of all textbooks that falsified and deleted the truth concerning Black folk". His lecture on "The African Origin of the Grecian Civilization" was delivered to supporters in Omaha and then published in The Journal of Negro History in 1917. Parker argued that new anthropological research had demonstrated that Mesopotamian and Greek civilization originated in Africa. In 1918 the League published his pamphlet "Children of the Sun", which further developed his arguments for the African origins presented in classical Egyptian, Asian and European civilizations. Author, journalist, and historian Joel Augustus Rogers named this publication as a valuable resource for his perspective.

Parker had an ideological counterpart and disciple in Cyril Briggs, a Caribbean-born journalist based in New York City who founded the African Blood Brotherhood. The organizations created by these two men often clashed and collaborated, although the latter leaned decidedly towards [Communistic] content and values. Additionally, the Hamitic League of the World published The Crusader in September 1918, a publication actually edited by Briggs, furthering the involvement of these two groups.

== Bibliography ==
- "The African Origin of the Grecian Civilization", The Journal of Negro History (1917)
- Children of the Sun, Hamitic League of the World (1918)

== See also ==
- Civil Rights Movement in Omaha, Nebraska
- Racial tension in Omaha, Nebraska
