= Communist Party USA and African Americans =

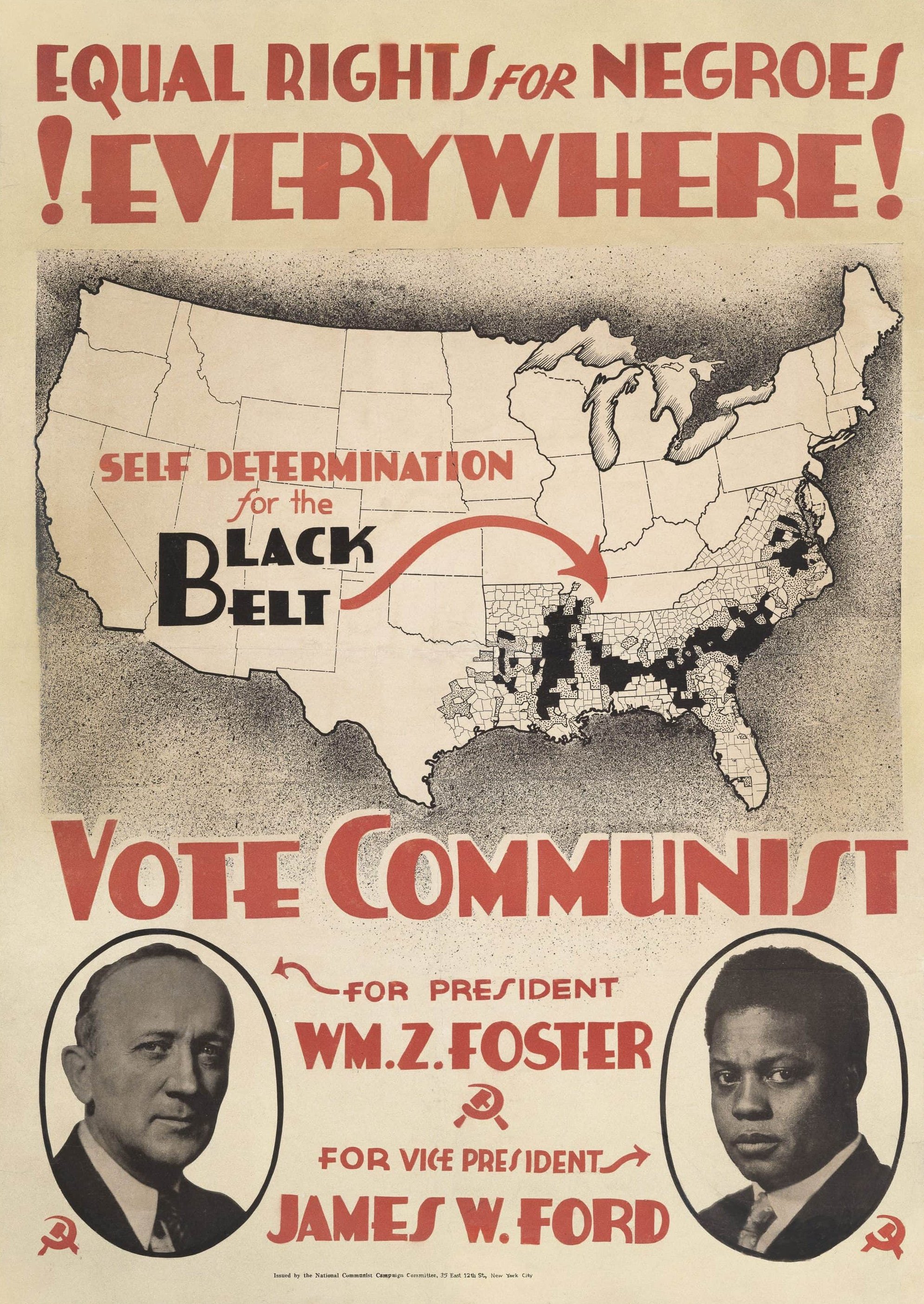
A 1932 Communist Party campaign poster featuring William Z. Foster and James W. Ford as candidates for President and Vice President, alongside the promise of self-determination for the Black Belt

The Communist Party USA, ideologically committed to fostering a socialist revolution in the United States, played a significant role in defending the civil rights of African Americans during its most influential years of the 1930s and 1940s. In that period, the African-American population was still concentrated in the South, where it was largely disenfranchised, excluded from the political system, and oppressed under Jim Crow laws.

By 1940, nearly 1.5 million African Americans had migrated out of the South to northern and midwestern cities and become urbanized, but they were often met with discrimination, especially among working-class ethnic whites with whom they competed for jobs and housing. The labor struggle continued, and many unions discriminated against black people. Additional migration of another 5 million African Americans out of the South continued during and after World War II, with many going to West Coast cities, where the defense industry had expanded dramatically and offered jobs.

== History ==
=== 1919–1928: early years ===
When the Communist Party USA was founded in the United States, it had almost no black members. The Communist Party had attracted most of its members from European immigrants and the various foreign language federations formerly associated with the Socialist Party of America; those workers, many of whom were not fluent English-speakers, often had little contact with black Americans or competed with them for jobs and housing.

The Socialist Party had not attracted many African-American members during the years before the split when the Communist Party was founded. While its most prominent leaders, including Eugene V. Debs, were committed opponents of racial segregation, many in the Socialist Party were often lukewarm on the issue of racism. They considered discrimination against black workers to be an extreme form of capitalist worker exploitation. In addition, the party's allegiance with unions that discriminated against minority workers compromised its willingness to attack racism directly; it did not seek out African-American members, nor did it hold recruitment drives where they lived. Some African Americans disaffected by Socialist attitudes joined the Communist Party; others went to the African Blood Brotherhood (ABB), a socialist group with a large number of Jamaican émigrés in its leadership, whose political philosophy was essentially Marxist in nature.

The Communist Party at first repeated the economic position of the Socialist Party. Committed from the outset to bringing about world revolution, the party sympathized with anti-colonial and national liberation movements around the globe. Its view of the black worker struggle and on civil rights for blacks were based in the broader terms of anti-colonialism. From its early years in the U.S., the party recruited African-American members, with mixed results. Some African Americans preferred competing groups such as the ABB.

In its early days, the party had the greatest appeal among black workers with an internationalist bent. From 1920 it began to intensively recruit African Americans as members. The most prominent black Communist Party members at this time were largely immigrants from the West Indies, who viewed a black worker struggle as being part of the broader campaigns against capitalism and imperialism.

The party's first significant move to attract black support was its outreach to Cyril Briggs, founder of both the ABB and the magazine The Crusader. The party had begun to promote The Crusader from early 1921. At the 1922 Fourth Congress of the Comintern, Claude McKay, a Jamaican poet, and Otto Huiswoud, born in Suriname, persuaded the Comintern to set up a multinational Negro Commission that sought to unite all movements of blacks fighting colonialism. Harry Haywood, an American communist drawn out of the ranks of the ABB, also played a leading role. McKay persuaded the founders of the Brotherhood to affiliate with the Communist Party in the early 1920s. The African Blood Brotherhood claimed to have almost 3,500 members; relatively few of them, however, joined the party.

The Fourth Comintern Congress passed a set of "Theses on the Negro Question", which guided the party's stance on race issues, contextualizing the African-American struggle for civil rights as part a broader wave of anti-colonial activity which was growing internationally, and stressing the need to link the black civil rights or liberation struggle to the fight against capitalism. The theses were influenced by the interventions of McKay and Huiswoud, who cited Lenin's views on nationalism, which distinguished between the nationalism of "oppressor nations" (which should be opposed) and that of "oppressed nations" (which should be supported), and drew parallels between national liberation movements and the fight against racial segregation in the United States. However, the theses were not received enthusiastically by the American party's leading faction, led by C. E. Ruthenberg, who wrote to the Comintern to argue that they were unhelpful in the United States. He also claimed that the ABB was fomenting scabbing by encouraging blacks to leave the South, and the party's central committee passed a resolution stipulating that neither Briggs nor Huiswold should be involved in the party's work on race issues. However, there was support for the Comintern line within the party: Robert Minor, who had been appointed to lead the party's Negro Committee, wrote a series of articles in the party magazine The Liberator which were consistent with the analysis contained in the theses.

The Comintern directed the American party in 1924 to redouble its efforts to organize African Americans. The party's earliest efforts focused on struggles in the Chicago area where it was initially headquartered, carrying out solidarity work for a strike by black female garment workers, and organizing the Negro Tenants Protective League in the city in order to stage rent strikes against exploitative landlords. The party subsequently created the American Negro Labor Congress (ANLC) in 1925. That organization was also a failure: although the black press greeted the organisation enthusiastically, the labor movement generally ignored it, aside from a few party-controlled unions that had few black members. The Congress' efforts were also stymied by the party's chaotic organization in the mid-1920s.

The ANLC, for its part, became isolated from other leading black organizations. It attacked the NAACP and related organizations as "middle-class accommodationists" controlled by white philanthropists. The ANLC and the Party had a more complex relationship with Marcus Garvey's Universal Negro Improvement Association (UNIA); while the party approved of Garvey's fostering of "race consciousness", it was strongly opposed to his support for a separate black nation. When the party made efforts to recruit members from the UNIA, Garvey expelled the party members and sympathizers in its ranks.

=== 1928–1935: Third Period and national self-determination ===
The 6th Congress of the Comintern held in 1928 changed the party's policy drastically; it adopted theses proposed by Haywood and Charles Nasanov, who claimed that blacks in the United States were a separate national group and that black farmers in the South were an incipient revolutionary force, due to their being oppressed by economic underdevelopment and segregation. Despite this theory dividing the American party, including African American communists – notable opponents included Haywood's brother, Otto Hall, who felt it ignored class differences in the black community and was not appropriate for American conditions, and James W. Ford, who believed that the theoretical debate about whether blacks constituted a distinct nation was a distraction from building black membership – the Comintern voted to support the demand for the right of self-determination for black people within a swath of counties with a majority-black population extending from eastern Virginia and the Carolinas through central Georgia, Alabama, the delta regions of Mississippi and Louisiana and the coastal areas of Texas. The party leadership was deeply divided into rival factions, with each eager to show its fealty to the Comintern's understanding of conditions in the United States. It promoted the nationalist policy.

Other left organizations ridiculed this policy, and it did not receive wide support from African Americans, either in the urban north or in the South. They had more immediate, pressing problems and the CPUSA had little foothold. While the party continued to give lip service to the goal of national self-determination for blacks, particularly in its theoretical writings, it largely ignored that demand in its practical work.

The party sent organizers to the Deep South for the first time in the late 1920s. The party focused its efforts, for the most part, on very concrete issues: organization of miners, steelworkers and tenant farmers, dealing with utility shutoffs, evictions, jobs, and unemployment benefits; trying to raise awareness of and prevent lynchings, and challenging the pervasive system of Jim Crow. It hoped to appeal to both white and black workers, starting in Birmingham the most industrialized city in Alabama. Black workers were attracted to the party, but whites stayed away.

The party also worked in rural areas to organize sharecroppers and tenant farmers, who worked under an oppressive system. In Camp Hill, Alabama in 1931 white vigilantes responded by murdering one leader, and local authorities charged and prosecuted black farmers for murder who had tried to fight off the mob. Attorneys with the International Labor Defense succeeded in having the charges dropped against all of the defendants. The Share Croppers' Union, formed after these events, continued organizing. After leading a strike in 1934 that won higher prices for cotton pickers despite intense hostility from local authorities and businesses, its membership increased to nearly 8,000.

The CPUSA's influence went beyond its black members, who did not exceed several hundred. In Alabama and other parts of the nation, the International Labor Defense, which focused on civil rights issues, had up to 2,000 members. The Sharecroppers' Union had up to 12,000 members in Alabama. Other related organizations were the International Workers Order, the League of Young Southerners, and the Southern Negro Youth Congress. Through these organizations, the CPUSA could be seen to "touch the lives easily of 20,000 people."

==== Scottsboro Boys and International Labor Defense ====
The party's most widely reported work in the South was its defense, through the International Labor Defense (ILD), of the "Scottsboro Boys", nine black men arrested in 1931 in Scottsboro, Alabama after a fight with some white men also riding the rails. They were convicted and sentenced to death for allegedly raping two white women on the same train. None of the defendants had shared the same boxcar as either of the women they were charged with raping.

The International Labor Defense was the first to offer its assistance. William L. Patterson, a black attorney who had left a successful practice to join the Communist Party, returned from training in the Soviet Union to run the ILD. After fierce disputes with the NAACP, with the ILD seeking to mount a broad-based political campaign to free the nine while the NAACP followed a more legalistic strategy, the ILD took control of the defendants' appeals. The ILD attracted national press attention to the case, and highlighted the racial injustices in the region.

The ILD overturned the men's convictions on appeal to the United States Supreme Court, which held in Powell v. Alabama, 287 U.S. 45 (1932) that the State's failure to provide the defendants with counsel in a capital case violated their rights under the Fourteenth Amendment. The ILD's battles with the NAACP continued when the cases returned to Alabama for retrial. The NAACP blamed the ILD for the lead defendant's being convicted and sentenced to death in the retrial. The NAACP later agreed to join with the ILD in defending the nine after other black organizations and a number of NAACP branches attacked it for that position, so the tensions never disappeared.

The ILD retained control of the second round of appeals. It won reversals of these convictions in Norris v. Alabama, 294 U.S. 587 (1935), on the ground that the exclusion of blacks from the jury pool had violated the defendants' constitutional rights. In a third retrial, all of the defendants were convicted.

The Scottsboro defense was one of the ILD's many cases in the South at that time: it also defended Angelo Herndon, a Communist Party activist sentenced to death by the State of Georgia for treason due to his advocacy of national self-determination for blacks in the Southern United States. The ILD also demanded retribution from state governments for the families of lynching victims, for their failure to protect blacks. It pushed for due process for criminal defendants. For a period of time in the early and mid-1930s, the ILD was the most active defender of blacks' civil rights in the South; it was the most popular party organization among African Americans.

The League of Struggle for Negro Rights, founded in 1930 as the successor to the ANLC, was particularly active in organizing support for the Scottsboro defendants. It also campaigned for a separate black nation in the South and against police brutality and Jim Crow laws. In addition, it advocated a more general policy of opposition to international fascism and support for the Soviet Union.

==== Organizing in the North ====
The party was also active in campaigning on issues concerning black Americans outside of the South. The CPUSA made a point of campaigning against racial segregation, both in the independent unions they were organizing during the Third Period and in the American Federation of Labor unions they were attacking. The party also made a concerted effort to weed out all forms of racism within its own membership, conducting a well-publicized trial of a Finnish member of a foreign-language federation in Harlem, who had acted insensitively toward blacks. The CPUSA organized among African Americans in the North on their local issues; it was, for example, either the first or one of the most active organizations in campaigning against evictions of tenants, for unemployment benefits, and against police brutality. In Chicago, they formed neighborhood Unemployed Councils. These were leaders against evictions, so that it was not uncommon for a mother receiving an eviction notice to call to her children, "Run quick and find the Reds!" In other instances during this period, the Communist Party joined in existing campaigns, such as the economic boycott, under the slogan of "Don't Buy Where You Can't Work," launched against Jewish and Italian businesses in Harlem that refused to hire African-American workers.

=== 1935–1939: popular front ===
In 1935, the Comintern abandoned the militancy of the Third Period in favor of a Popular Front, which sought to unite socialist and non-socialist organizations of similar politics around the common cause of anti-fascism. This confirmed its policy. The party had mended its relations, at least temporarily, with groups such as the NAACP and had developed relations with church groups, particularly in the North. The party had also started edging toward support of the New Deal by moderating its attacks on the Roosevelt administration, which had promoted programs alleviating the most severe economic problems.

As a sign of its new approach, the CPUSA folded up the League of Struggle for Negro Rights and joined with other non-communist groups to create a new organization, the National Negro Congress. A. Philip Randolph, a longtime member of the Socialist Party, served as its head. The NNC functioned as an umbrella organization, bringing together black fraternal, church and civic groups. It supported the efforts of the CIO to organize in the steel, automobile, tobacco and meat packinghouse industries. The NAACP kept its distance from the NNC, whose leaders accused the organization of ignoring the interests of working-class blacks.

As part of its new platform that "Communism is twentieth century Americanism", it campaigned for the end of racial discrimination. When black residents of Harlem rioted in 1935 after false reports that a youth arrested for shoplifting had been killed by the police, Communist Party activists joined with Mayor Fiorello LaGuardia and NAACP leader Walter White to try to avert further violence.

On the other hand, the party continued to emphasize issues pertaining to black workers. It also denounced lynching and similar violent acts directed at blacks. Communists joined with labor and civil rights groups to form the Southern Conference for Human Welfare, which campaigned for civil rights and socialism. A New York City school teacher and party member, Abel Meeropol, wrote the song "Strange Fruit" to dramatize the horrors of lynching in the South, which had reached a peak around the turn of the century.

The party tailored its campaign for unity against fascism to appeal to the black community, as in the case of its opposition to the Italian invasion of Ethiopia in 1935. Black members went to Spain to fight in the Spanish Civil War; the Lincoln Brigade was the first military force of Americans to include blacks and whites integrated on an equal basis and black officers commanding white troops.

==== Organizing black workers ====
The Communist Party made the fight against racism within the labor movement and Jim Crow outside it one of its consistent principles from the early 1920s forward. While maintaining a position against white supremacy, the Party made special efforts to organize black miners in the strikes its National Miners Union led in western Pennsylvania in 1928 at the same time as leading strikes of (nearly exclusively) white textile workers in the Carolinas and Georgia in 1929 and coal miners in Harlan County, Kentucky in 1931. Local authorities used this issue and the Party's support for "godless communism" and the Soviet Union to drive a wedge between the strike leadership and white workers.

The Party made more progress in organizing African-American workers in the New Deal era, particularly through unions associated with it, such as Mine, Mill and Smelter Workers Union, which organized black miners in Alabama, the Packinghouse Workers Organizing Committee, which created interracial coalitions in the meatpacking plants in Chicago and elsewhere, and the Food and Tobacco Workers, who established integrated unions with interracial leadership in North Carolina and Kentucky. Those unions established deep roots among the black workers in those industries, who remained supportive of the left leadership of their unions even as the party itself became increasingly unpopular in the late 1940s and the 1950s.

In the United Auto Workers, in which the CPUSA once vied for leadership, both the party and its opponents led by Walter Reuther campaigned for the demands of black workers and against "hate strikes" and race riots led by white workers opposed to working with African-Americans, but disagreed as to how the union should respond.

Party activists and organizers also played a significant role in organizing black workers in other unions, such as the Steel Workers Organizing Committee, in which the CPUSA had a role, but not leadership. The party did not, however, make any consistent progress in recruiting black members through its union organizing efforts. In the SWOC, for example, the Party's organizers suppressed their identity as communists and much of their politics in order to avoid political differences with Philip Murray, who headed the organizing the campaign, and the Congress of Industrial Organizations, which was financing it. Those organizers rarely were able, in any case, to stay in an area long enough to allow them to cultivate the relationships that would have allowed them to bring individual workers into the party.

In other industries from which blacks were excluded or made up a small part of the workforce, progress was gradual. The Transport Workers Union of America, which denounced segregation but took only halting efforts to oppose it during its early years, formed coalitions with Adam Clayton Powell Jr., the NAACP and the Negro National Congress in the early 1940s to eliminate occupational segregation and to require ambitious affirmative action goals in New York City public transit. The TWU also fought against employment discrimination in public transit in Philadelphia in 1944, during which time the federal government ordered the private transit company to desegregate its workforce, provoking a wildcat strike of many of the union's newly organized members that was ended only when the Franklin D. Roosevelt administration sent troops to guard the system and arrested the strike's ringleaders.

On the other hand, the record of other left unions was mixed. The International Longshore and Warehouse Union, with its power over the workplace exercised through its hiring hall, eliminated formal barriers to black employment, although a degree of informal segregation returned through the institution of casual employment. The United Electrical, Radio and Machine Workers of America (or UE) ignored party directives to confront the issue in its industry, calculating that any challenge to the principle of seniority by pursuing affirmative action remedies for black workers would prove immensely unpopular among white workers.

==== Communists and black culture ====
During the Popular Front era the party attracted support from a number of the brightest lights in African-American literature, including Langston Hughes, Richard Wright, Ralph Ellison, Chester Himes, some of whom joined the party, only to break with it in later years. Paul Robeson, a vocal defender of the Soviet Union, apparently never joined the party, but was loyal to at least a few of its members including Benjamin J. Davis Jr. who was jailed under The Smith Act.

The Communist Party also took up benign issues. The party's newspaper, The Daily Worker, started agitating for integration of major league baseball in the mid-1930s. The party also made a point of integrating its dances and other social events and continued to ostracize and expel members accused of "white chauvinism".

=== 1939–1945: World War II ===
The signing of the Molotov–Ribbentrop Pact damaged the party significantly in the black community. A. Philip Randolph resigned from the Negro National Congress in protest and black newspapers throughout the North condemned the party for its rapid volte face. The CPUSA attacked its opponents as warmongers. When Adolf Hitler's forces invaded the Soviet Union, the party switched to an all-out support for the war effort. It denounced Randolph's proposed March on Washington against employment discrimination in war industries, arguing that it might harm production. But the CPUSA still demanded that defense contractors integrate and took steps to combat "hate strikes" and white-led race riots in Detroit.

=== 1946–1959: post–World War II era ===
In 1946, the NNC and the ILD merged to form the Civil Rights Congress. The CRC continued its activities during the height of postwar attacks on the Communist Party, denouncing discrimination in the judicial system, segregated housing, and other forms of discrimination that blacks faced in both the North and the South.

The party had hopes of remaining in the mainstream of American politics in the postwar era. Benjamin J. Davis Jr. ran for and won a seat on the City Council in New York City in 1945, advertising his membership in the Communist Party and drawing on both black and white support. That era did not last. New York City changed the rules for electing members of the City Council after Davis' election. Davis lost the next race in 1949 by a landslide to an anti-communist candidate. He was under indictment for advocating the overthrow of the United States government, and this did not help his candidacy.

The CRC became increasingly isolated in this new climate as former allies refused to have anything to do with it. Represented by William Patterson and Paul Robeson, it attempted to file a petition entitled "We Charge Genocide" with the United Nations in 1949 that condemned the treatment of black citizens in the United States. Patterson was convicted a year later of violating the Smith Act; in 1954 the Attorney General Herbert Brownell Jr. declared the CRC to be a subversive organization. The CRC received especially hostile attention from state authorities in the South, where it and related organizations were often raided or banned. The CRC dissolved in 1956, just as the civil rights movement in the South was about to become a mass movement.

At the same time the internal turmoil brought on by the Cold War, the Smith Act prosecutions, and the ouster of Earl Browder, led to an internal battle. The Party expelled a number of members who were accused of displaying "white chauvinism". In the grim days of 1949 and 1950, as the CP was about to be driven out of the CIO and much of the U.S. labor movement, many CPUSA leaders began to view their work among the white working class as a failure and the black working class as the "vanguard of the revolution".

In 1954, the CPUSA dropped support for self-determination.

The Party directed those unions with CPUSA leadership to take a stance against continued use of seniority systems in those workplaces in which seniority made it more difficult for black workers to break out of segregated job classifications. It advocated "superseniority" for black workers, an early version of the type of measures that came to be known as "affirmative action" twenty years later. Many left-led unions, such as the UE, simply ignored the Party's directive.

=== 1960–1970s: New Left and afterwards ===
The Communist Party continued, even after splits and defections left it much smaller, into the 1960s. It made efforts to reestablish itself among students through the W. E. B. Du Bois Clubs, named after one of the original founders of the NAACP, who joined the CPUSA in 1961. Other youth organizations, such as the Che-Lumumba Club in Los Angeles, flourished for a time, then disappeared.

The parties’ fortunes appeared to revive for a while in the late 1960s, when party members such as Angela Davis became associated with the most militant wing of the Black Power movement. The party did not, however, reap any long-term benefits from this brief period of renewed exposure: it did not establish any lasting relations with the Black Panther Party, which was largely destroyed by the early 1970s, and did not recruit any significant number of members from those organizations or win them to its politics.

The party maintained some standing in the black community through its former allies, including Coleman Young of Detroit and Gus Newport in Berkeley, California, who were elected to office in the 1970s.

== The Communist Party and police brutality ==
The Communist Party USA (CPUSA) was one of the most active political organizations in challenging police brutality in the twentieth century, particularly by linking it to broader systems of racial and class oppression. For many early communists in the United States, many saw excessive police violence as a form of "northern lynching" perpetrated by people in power

The CPUSA analyzed police brutality through the lenses of both class and race, arguing that the police functioned as part of a capitalist system designed to suppress the working class, while also using racial division to prevent unity among workers. Race was argued to be a significant element, as it was seen as a tool used by those in power to divide the working class into opposing races, black and white, rather than a unified front.

Ben Davis, a black member of the Communist Party, heavily addressed police brutality at the forefront of his politics, echoing the argument that police brutality was a means to control the working class. Davis became the first declared black member of the Communist party to be elected into the New York City council in 1943, and served until he was expelled in 1949 in violation of the Smith Act. Davis' work continues to highlight the intersectionality of race and the communist party's work throughout the Cold war years.

In Harlem, New York City, the party was particularly involved in anti-police activism and protest. The death of veteran John Derrick stirred the community in 1950, making it a hot spot for activity against police brutality. Gonzalo Gonzalez, described as a Mexican communist, was shot in the heart whilst picketing in alignment with the death of another African American party member Alfred Luro, which marked the involvement of interracial alignment within the party against police brutality. Many members of the party believed that the police also targeted them, in particular people of color, as another way to suppress their political voice.

== See also ==
- 1933 Funsten Nut strike
- African Blood Brotherhood
- James S. Allen
- Claudia Jones
- Triple oppression
