= Gwendolyn Midlo Hall =

American historian (1929–2022)

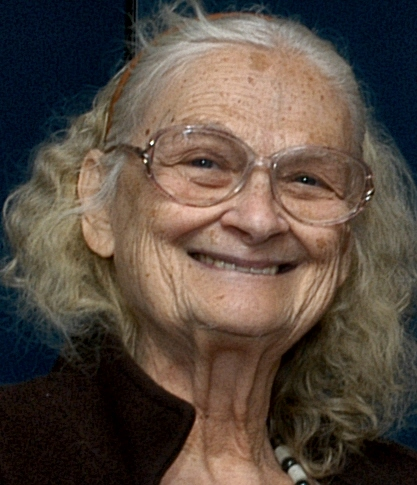
- Born: Gwendolyn Charmaine Midlo; June 27, 1929; New Orleans, Louisiana, U.S.
- Died: August 29, 2022 (aged 93); Guanajuato City, Mexico
- Education: Tulane University; Mexico City College (BA, MA); University of Michigan (PhD)
- Spouses: Michael Yuspeh (m. 1949; div. 1955) Harry Haywood (né Haywood Hall Jr.) (m. 1956; died 1985)

Gwendolyn Midlo Hall (June 27, 1929 – August 29, 2022) was an American historian who focused on the history of slavery in the Caribbean, Latin America, Louisiana (United States), Africa, and the African Diaspora in the Americas. Discovering extensive French and Spanish colonial documents related to the slave trade in Louisiana, she wrote Africans in Colonial Louisiana: The Development of Afro-Creole Culture in the Eighteenth Century (1992), studied the ethnic origins of enslaved Africans brought to Louisiana, as well as the process of creolization, which created new cultures. She changed the way in which several related disciplines are researched and taught, adding to scholarly understanding of the diverse origins of cultures throughout the Americas.

In addition, Hall created a database of records identifying and describing more than 100,000 enslaved Africans. It has become a primary resource for historical and genealogical research. She earned recognition in academia, and has been featured in The New York Times, People Magazine, ABC News, BBC, and other popular outlets for her contributions to scholarship, genealogy, and the critical reevaluation of the history of slavery.

Hall was also Professor Emerita of Latin American and Caribbean History at Rutgers University in New Jersey, where she taught for 25 years.

== Biography ==
=== Early life and education ===
Gwendolyn Midlo was born June 27, 1929, in New Orleans, Louisiana, the daughter of Ethel and Herman L. Midlo, a civil rights and labor attorney. Her parents were of Russian– and Polish–Jewish ancestry. She was influenced by her father's activism. In 1990 her mother founded the Ethel and Herman Midlo Center for New Orleans Studies at the University of New Orleans, where her father had donated his papers.

Hall has had a career marked by early political activism as well as academic scholarship. After World War II, at age 16 in 1945, Hall helped organize and participated in the New Orleans Youth Council, an interracial, direct-action community group, which encouraged and helped African-American voter registration and defied racial segregation laws. In 1946 she was elected to the executive board of the Southern Negro Youth Congress at the Southern Youth Legislature in Columbia, South Carolina. It had operated since 1937 to end lynching, racial discrimination and segregation, and to achieve voting rights for all.

Hall helped organize Young Progressives, an interracial youth and student movement in segregated New Orleans that included students from Tulane University, Newcomb College, and Loyola University (white colleges) and from Dillard and Xavier universities (historically black colleges). She was active in the 1948 presidential campaign of Henry Wallace, the Progressive Party candidate, working in New Orleans, rural Louisiana, and Atlanta, Georgia. She also was active in the Civil Rights Congress and the Southern Conference for Human Welfare.

Starting at Sophie Newcomb College of Tulane University, Hall studied history. After years of political activism and marriage, Hall completed some of her academic studies outside the United States, which gave her broader insight as she acquired fluency in French and Spanish and could use archives in other countries. She earned a B.A. in history at Mexico City College, 1962 and a master's in Latin American History, also at Mexico City College in 1963–64.

While a doctoral graduate student at the University of Michigan, Hall published an article advocating medical treatment for heroin addicts: "Mechanisms for Exploiting the Black Community", The Negro Digest, November 1969. It inspired demonstrations in the streets of Detroit. She organized methadone-maintenance treatment programs in both Detroit and Ann Arbor, Michigan. Adoption of such treatment by major cities helped reduce heroin use and the crime rate in the inner city of Detroit and others. Hall earned a Ph.D. in Latin American History at the University of Michigan, Ann Arbor, in 1970.

=== Academic career ===
Hall and Harry Haywood moved to Mexico City, Mexico, in early 1959, shortly before he was expelled from the Communist Party over ideological differences. Hall completed her B.A. and master's degrees in Mexico City before returning to the US in 1964. In 1966 she started her graduate studies to earn her doctorate at the University of Michigan. The couple separated and she raised their children by herself after 1964.

In 1965, while teaching black students at Elizabeth City State College in North Carolina, Hall encouraged them to organize armed resistance against the Ku Klux Klan and to oppose the United States military intervention in Vietnam. She chaired the Defense Committee for civil rights leader Robert F. Williams when he was extradited from Michigan to Monroe, North Carolina, in 1975. During the 1960s and early 1970s, she published a number of influential essays in African-American magazines. Hall was fired and blacklisted in 1965 by Elizabeth City State College and the F.B.I. for her activities.

When she moved to Michigan, Hall worked in Detroit during 1965 and 1966, often with Grace Lee Boggs, as a temporary legal secretary. She had to keep a step ahead of the F.B.I. which tried to get her fired from wherever she worked. The F.B.I. engineered the eviction of Hall and her two young children from three apartments which she rented in Michigan during her first year: two in Detroit and one in Ann Arbor. She persisted in completing course work and her Ph.D. dissertation for her doctorate, which was published as Social Control in Slave Plantation Societies: A Comparison of St. Domingue and Cuba (1971) by Johns Hopkins University Press.

After completing her doctorate, Hall started as an assistant professor at Rutgers University in New Brunswick, New Jersey, where she advanced to full professor in 1993. She taught Caribbean and Latin American history, as well as classes on the African diaspora. Publication in 1992 of her Africans in Colonial Louisiana supported a reevaluation of African-American contributions to Louisiana and United States culture. She discovered significant colonial data in courthouses in Pointe Coupee Parish and others in Louisiana, and also used national and state archives in France, Spain and Texas. Finding that French and Spanish records had more details about the origins and individual characteristics of slaves than did those of the British and Americans, she developed important material on the cultures of Africans in Louisiana, documenting many individuals as part of specific ethnic cultures on the African continent.

She worked for 15 years, five years with research assistants, to develop a searchable database on more than 100,000 slaves identified in historic records. These included Africans transported to Louisiana in the 18th and 19th centuries. The material was published on a CD in 2000 by Louisiana State University Press and online in 2001 by ibiblio. The database includes such details as slave name, gender, age, occupation, illnesses, family relationships, ethnicity, place of origin, prices paid by slave owners, slaves' testimony, and emancipations of slaves.

While an influential academic work, her book Africans in Colonial Louisiana has also become popular among jazz musicians in New Orleans. It continues to be appreciated by Afro-Americans and many whites in Louisiana. New Orleans jazz musicians refer to it as the "purple book". It is an important starting point for people who want to learn more about African-American culture in Louisiana and elsewhere.

In 2010, Hall accepted a position as Professor of History at Michigan State University, where she devoted most of her time to Biographies: The Atlantic Slave Database Network. Walter Hawthorne, Chair of the History Department, is co-principal investigator of this project. MATRIX provides the technology, hosting and storage. The project was initially funded by a contract from the National Endowment for the Humanities.

Hall's work has been distinguished by her use of original language archives in France and Spain, as well as of records in Latin America, providing a broad base for comparison of slavery in different societies. She has published internationally in English, French, Spanish, and Portuguese, and lectured internationally in English, French and Spanish.

In 2021, Hall published a memoir, Haunted by Slavery: A Southern White Woman in the Freedom Struggle. She died on August 29, 2022, in Guanajuato City, Mexico, where she lived with her son, Haywood Hall, and his family.

=== Marriage and family ===
In 1949, Hall's family sent her to Paris after she was arrested for violating segregation laws. There she learned French and studied classical piano. She married piano instructor Michael Yuspeh, but by 1955 the pair separated and later divorced. Her oldest son Leonid Avram Yuspeh was born in Paris, France, in 1951 from this marriage.

After divorce, she next married Harry Haywood in 1956. He was a political activist, member of the Communist Party, USA, and theoretician of self-determination for the African-American nation of the Deep South. She changed her name at marriage to conform to his legal birth name of Haywood Hall. They were married until his death in 1985. Two children were born from this marriage: Dr. Haywood Hall, an emergency physician, and Rebecca Hall, an attorney with a Ph.D. in history.

Between 1953 and 1964, Hall collaborated with Haywood in freelance writing about theoretical aspects of the civil rights and black protest movement in the United States. Some of these articles were a joint publication in several issues of Soulbook Magazine, which began publication in Berkeley, California, in 1964.

== Works ==
=== Collected papers ===
The Gwendolyn Midlo Hall papers (1939–1991) are housed at the Bentley Historical Library at the University of Michigan and later ones associated with her work on Africans in Louisiana at the Amistad Research Center at Tulane University.

The Harry Haywood papers are housed at the Bentley Historical Library and the Manuscript, Archives, and Rare Books Division of the Schomburg Center for Research in Black Culture, New York Public Library.

=== Published books and databases ===
- Social Control in Slave Plantation Societies: A Comparison of St. Domingue and Cuba (Baltimore, MD: Johns Hopkins Press, 1971)
- Africans in Colonial Louisiana: The Development of Afro-Creole Culture in the Eighteenth Century (Baton Rouge, LA: Louisiana State University Press, 1992) (This won nine book prizes, including the John Hope Franklin Prize of the American Studies Association.)
- Love, War, and the 96th Engineers (Colored): The New Guinea Diaries of Captain Hyman Samuelson During World War II (editor; University of Illinois Press, 1995)
- Louisiana Slave Database and Louisiana Free Database 1719–1820, in Hall, Databases for the Study of Afro-Louisiana History and Genealogy, Compact Disc Publication (Louisiana State University Press, 2000)
- Slavery and African Ethnicities in the Americas: Restoring the Links (Chapel Hill: University of North Carolina Press, 2005)
- "Escravidão e etnias africanas nas Américas: Restaurando os elos". (Editora Vozes Limitada, Brazil, November 8, 2017)
- A Black Communist in the Freedom Struggle: The Life of Harry Haywood (editor; Minneapolis: University of Minnesota Press, 2012)
- Haunted by Slavery: A Memoir of a Southern White Woman in the Freedom Struggle (Chicago: Haymarket Books, 2021)

=== Articles ===
- "Negro Slaves in the Americas", Freedomways, Vol. 4, No. 3, Summer 1964, pp. 296–327.
- "Detroit's Moment of Truth", Freedomways, Vol. 7, No. 1, Fall 1967.
- "St. Malcolm and the Black Revolutionist", Negro Digest, November 1967.
- "Black Resistance in Colonial Haiti", Negro Digest, February 1968.
- "Race and Class in Brazil", Freedomways, Vol. 8, No. 1 (Winter, 1968).
- "The Myth of Benevolent Spanish Slave Laws", Negro Digest, March 1969.
- "Africans in the Americas", Negro Digest, March 1969.
- "Rural, Black College", Negro Digest, March 1969.
- "Junkie Myths", The Black Liberator, July 1969.
- "Mechanisms for Exploiting the Black Community", Parts 1 and 2, Negro Digest, October and November 1969.
- "What Toussaint L'Ouverture Can Teach Us", Black World, February 1972.

== Honors ==
- National Endowment for the Humanities "We the People Fellowship" 2006–07
- Distinguished Service Award, Organization of American Historians (2004)
- Knight of the Order of Arts and Letters, elected by the National Assembly of France (1997)
- Guggenheim Fellowship, 1996
