= Otto Hall =

African American communist and labor right activist (1891–c. 1968

Otto Hall (May 16, 1891 – c. January 1968) was an African-American communist and labor rights activist from Omaha, Nebraska, United States. Born to former slaves, he was the older brother of Harry Haywood. Hall fought in France during the First World War and joined the Communist Party in 1921.
