= Bonita Williams =

British West-Indian Communist Party leader

Bonita Williams was a British West-Indian Communist Party leader, poet, and civil rights activist in Harlem, New York during the Great Depression in the 1930s. During this time, she wrote several poems and gave speeches focusing on black suffrage and workers' rights in the context of racial discrimination and class inequity. In addition, Williams served as the leader of several Harlem-based organizations, namely the Harlem Unemployment Council, Harlem Tenants' League, Harlem Action Committee against the High Cost of Living, and League of Struggle for Negro Rights (LSNR).

Williams was also a prominent communist in Harlem, serving as the Secretary of Organizing for the Harlem Communist Party and Executive Director of the United Tenants and Consumer’s Organization in the late 1940s. In this capacity, she served as a primary recruiter of Black men and women for the party, working to grow the number of African Americans identifying with the communist agenda during a time of increasing racial segregation.

== Activism ==
As a member of the Communist Party USA, Williams led a number of activist movements among other Communist Party leaders. Prominent among them was her involvement in the Scottsboro Boys trial alongside activist Queen Mother Moore, a case involving nine young black men wrongfully accused of raping two white women in Alabama. In solidarity with the Scottsboro Boys, Williams and Moore marched, wrote letters, and organized supporters in an effort to free these men from wrongful prosecution. This activism ultimately brought Williams to the Communist Party.

As an employee at the Works Progress Administration (WPA) in the late 1930s, Williams created a union supporting women of color, specifically the Italian, Puerto Rican, and black women at the WPA.

With Richard B. Moore, Williams organized a protest in Harlem against British forces for shooting striking Jamaican cane workers. Williams also led additional protests against those in Harlem that posed a threat to working class communities of color. For example, Williams led a protest against store owners in Harlem that inflated meat prices and refused to employ workers of color through the “Don’t Buy Where You Can’t Work” campaign. In one of her campaigns against increased prices during the Great Depression, Williams successfully lobbied Harlem butchers to lower inflated meat prices by 25%. As head of the Harlem Workers Alliance, Williams led coordinated efforts against evictions and decreased welfare allotments.

== Involvement in the Communist Party ==
Williams joined the Communist Party following her involvement in the Scottsboro Boys Trial with Queen Mother Moore. Later in their friendship, Williams and Moore traveled to the Soviet Union. Based on their experience abroad, Williams and Moore remarked that the Soviets could serve as models for black women’s liberation in the United States, a perspective they took back to Harlem and their continued activism as communists.

Williams was criticized in Congressional testimony given by Walter S. Steele to the House Committee on Un-American Activities, in which he described her as a prominent member of the Communist Party in New York State.

== Poetry and oration ==
In Harlem, Bonita Williams was often published and cited in the Harlem Liberator, an African American newspaper published during the Great Depression era by the League of Struggle for Negro Rights. Specifically, her poems and remarks on class inequality, racial discrimination, and labor rights were featured. One of her poems, “Fifteen Million Negroes Speak”, was published in the October 14, 1933 issue of the Harlem Liberator, urging poor blacks to demand a national Bill of Civil Rights from the U.S. government. An excerpt from the poem reads: “We must demand of the government Negro masses' democratic rights”, a line emblematic of Williams' focus on civil rights for Black Americans in Harlem. Little is known about Williams' other poems, though her oration and poetry were well-regarded during the time, especially among poor African Americans hoping to achieve class mobility.
