= League of Struggle for Negro Rights =

Organization

The League of Struggle for Negro Rights was organized by the Communist Party in 1930 as the successor to the American Negro Labor Congress. The League was particularly active in organizing support for the "Scottsboro Boys", nine black men sentenced to death in 1931 for crimes they had not committed. It also campaigned for a separate black nation in the South, one of the CPUSA's principal tenets in the early 1930s, and against police brutality, the Italian occupation of Ethiopia and Jim Crow laws, while also advocating a more general policy of opposition to fascism and support for the Soviet Union.

Langston Hughes became its President in 1934. Harry Haywood was its General Secretary. Another prominent leader of the organization was Bonita Williams, a migrant from the British Caribbean living in Harlem, who joined the group after abandoning Garveyism. During her time with the league, Williams organized "'Flying Squads,' which mobilized working-class housewives to agitate against high food prices."

Revels Cayton co-founded the Seattle chapter of the League in August 1934. In 1935, the chapter helped campaign against a bill that would have prohibited interracial marriage in Washington, and successfully blocked the law.

The organization largely disappeared after 1935, when the Communist Party, as part of its Popular Front strategy, joined with other non-communist organizations and individuals to form the National Negro Congress.

== See also ==
- The Communist Party and African-Americans
- American Negro Labor Congress

== Pamphlets ==
- The South Comes North in Detroit's Own Scottsboro Case by Harry Haywood New York : Published for League of Struggle for Negro Rights, by Workers' Library Publishers, 1932
- They Shall Not Die! The Story of Scottsboro in Pictures; Stop the Legal Lynching! by Elizabeth Lawson, Anton Refregier and B. D. Amis New York: Published for League of Struggle for Negro Rights, by Workers' Library Publishers, 1932
- Equality, land and freedom: a program for Negro liberation New York City : League of Struggle for Negro Rights, 1933
- The Borden case : the struggle for Negro rights in Boston, under the leadership of the L.S.N.R. Boston : The League, 1934.
- "You cannot kill the working class," New York: International Labor Defense and the League of Struggle for Negro Rights 1937.
