= Harry Haywood =

African-American communist and political activist (1898–1985)

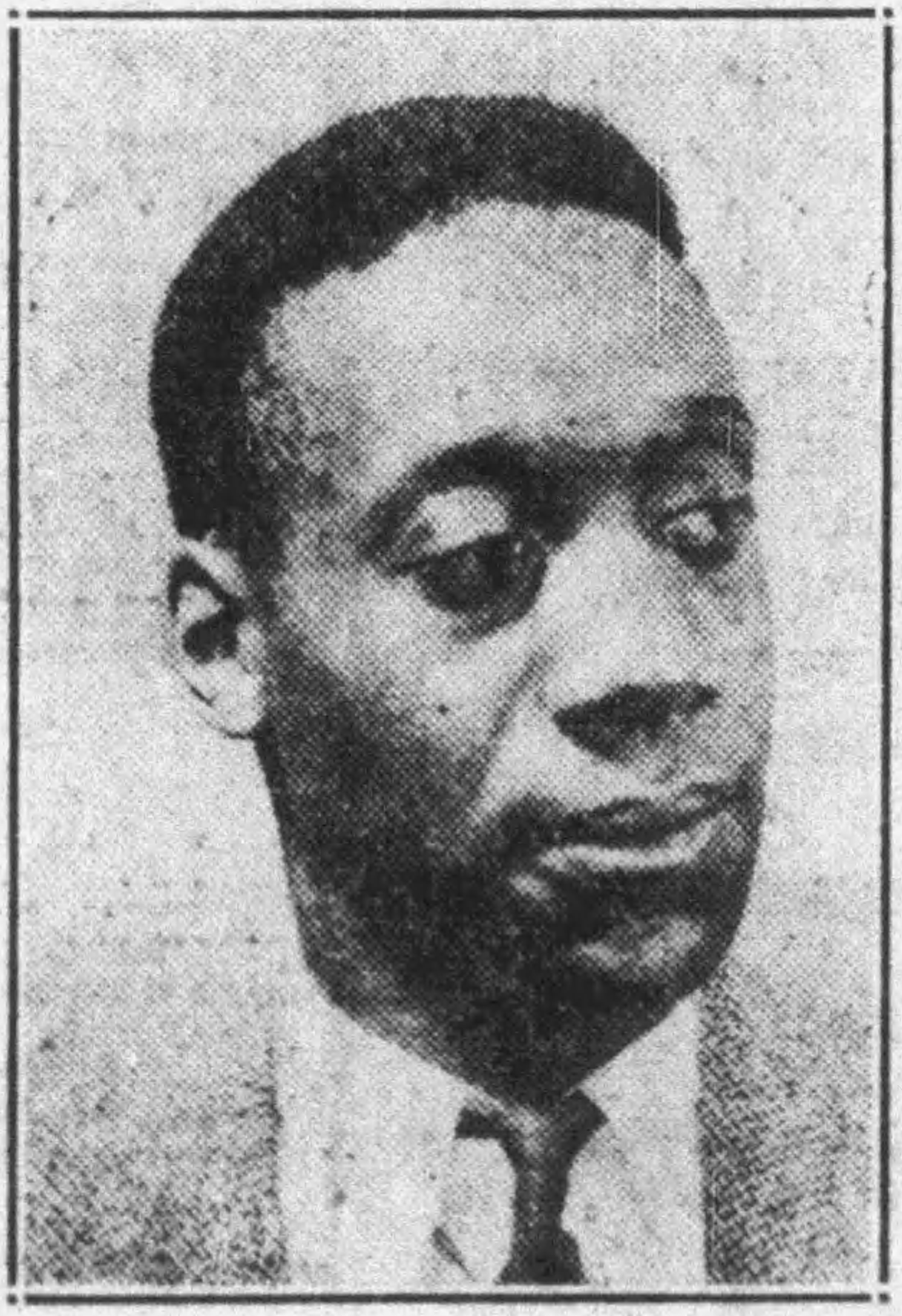
- Haywood c. 1934
- Born: Haywood Hall Jr. February 4, 1898; South Omaha, Nebraska, U.S.
- Died: January 4, 1985 (aged 86); New York City, New York, U.S.
- Resting place: Arlington National Cemetery
- Education: Communist University of the Toilers of the East; International Lenin School
- Occupation: Political activist
- Political party: Communist Party USA
- Spouse(s): Hazel (m. 1920; div. 1921) Ekaterina (m. 1927, divorced) Belle Lewis (m. 1940; div. 1955) Gwendolyn Midlo Hall (m. 1956)
- Children: 2
- Military career
- Allegiance: United States; Spanish Republic; United States
- Branch: United States Army; International Brigades; United States Merchant Marine
- Service years: 1917–1919; 1937; 1943–1945
- Rank: Corporal; Regimental Commissar
- Units: 8th Regiment; The "Abraham Lincoln" XV International Brigade
- Conflicts: World War I; Western Front; Spanish Civil War; Battle of Brunete; World War II

Harry Haywood (born Haywood Hall Jr; February 4, 1898 – January 4, 1985) was an American political activist and a leading figure in the Communist Party of the United States (CPUSA). He was principally known for his efforts "to bring the political philosophy of the Party in line with issues of race."

In 1926, he joined with other African-American communists and traveled to the Soviet Union as a student. While there he became a Communist International (Comintern) delegate. He stayed four years and studied the Marxist-Leninist theory of the "national question" regarding how to unify ethnic nationalities within a country's dominant culture. Haywood's work in the USSR resulted in his being selected to head the CPUSA's "Negro Department". In the 1930s he organized a movement to defend the Scottsboro boys in Alabama. He made theoretical contributions to the African-American national question. He argued that blacks represented an oppressed nation inside the U.S. and had the right to self-determination. His doctrine was known as the Black Belt thesis, i.e., blacks should be able to form their own nation-state in the Black Belt South. In the 1950s as the CPUSA platform moved away from black nationalism and separatism and towards integration, Haywood lost standing in the Party until he was expelled in 1959.

Haywood fought in three wars: World War I, the Spanish Civil War, and World War II. He authored several books and pamphlets, including Negro Liberation in 1948, and "For a Revolutionary Position on the Negro Question" in 1957. After his expulsion from the CPUSA, he remained a left-wing activist. In the 1960s, he became involved in the Maoist New Communist movement. In 1978, his autobiography Black Bolshevik was published.

== Early years ==
Harry Haywood was born Haywood Hall Jr., on February 4, 1898, in South Omaha, Nebraska, to former slaves Harriet and Haywood Hall, from Missouri and West Tennessee, respectively. They had migrated to Omaha because of jobs with the railroads and meatpacking industry, as did numerous other Southern blacks. Haywood was the youngest of three sons.

In 1913 after Haywood Hall Sr. was attacked by whites, the Hall family moved to Minneapolis, Minnesota. Two years later in 1915 they moved to Chicago. The younger Hall's education was limited. He never went beyond the eighth grade and had to self-educate afterward. At age sixteen, he began working as a dining car waiter on the Chicago and North Western Railway line.

During World War I, he served with the Eighth Regiment, a black U.S. regiment. Upon his return to Chicago, he was radicalized by the bitter Red Summer of 1919, especially the Chicago race riot, in which mostly ethnic Irish attacked blacks on the South Side. Hall was influenced by his older brother Otto Hall, who joined the Communist Party in 1921 and invited him to enter the secret African Blood Brotherhood. Hall was also affected by his reading of Vladimir Lenin's State and Revolution. He later wrote in his autobiography that "this work was the single most important book I had read in the entire three years of my political search and was decisive in leading me to the Communist Party."

=== Military service ===
Hall's military career included service in three wars. His interest in military combat began when his friends told tales of heroic feats by the Eighth Illinois, a Black National Guard Regiment. In WWI, he saw action in the Soissons sector of France in the summer of 1918. In the Spanish Civil War, he fought for the Popular Front with the Abraham Lincoln Battalion of the International Brigades. He held the position of Regimental Commissar in the XV International Brigade during the Battle of Brunete. While in Spain he, Langston Hughes and Walter Benjamin Garland broadcast from Madrid in support of the Republican cause. During World War II, Haywood was involved with the National Maritime Union in San Pedro, California. This led to his enlisting in 1943 in the U.S. Merchant Marines.

== Political career ==
=== Communist Party USA ===
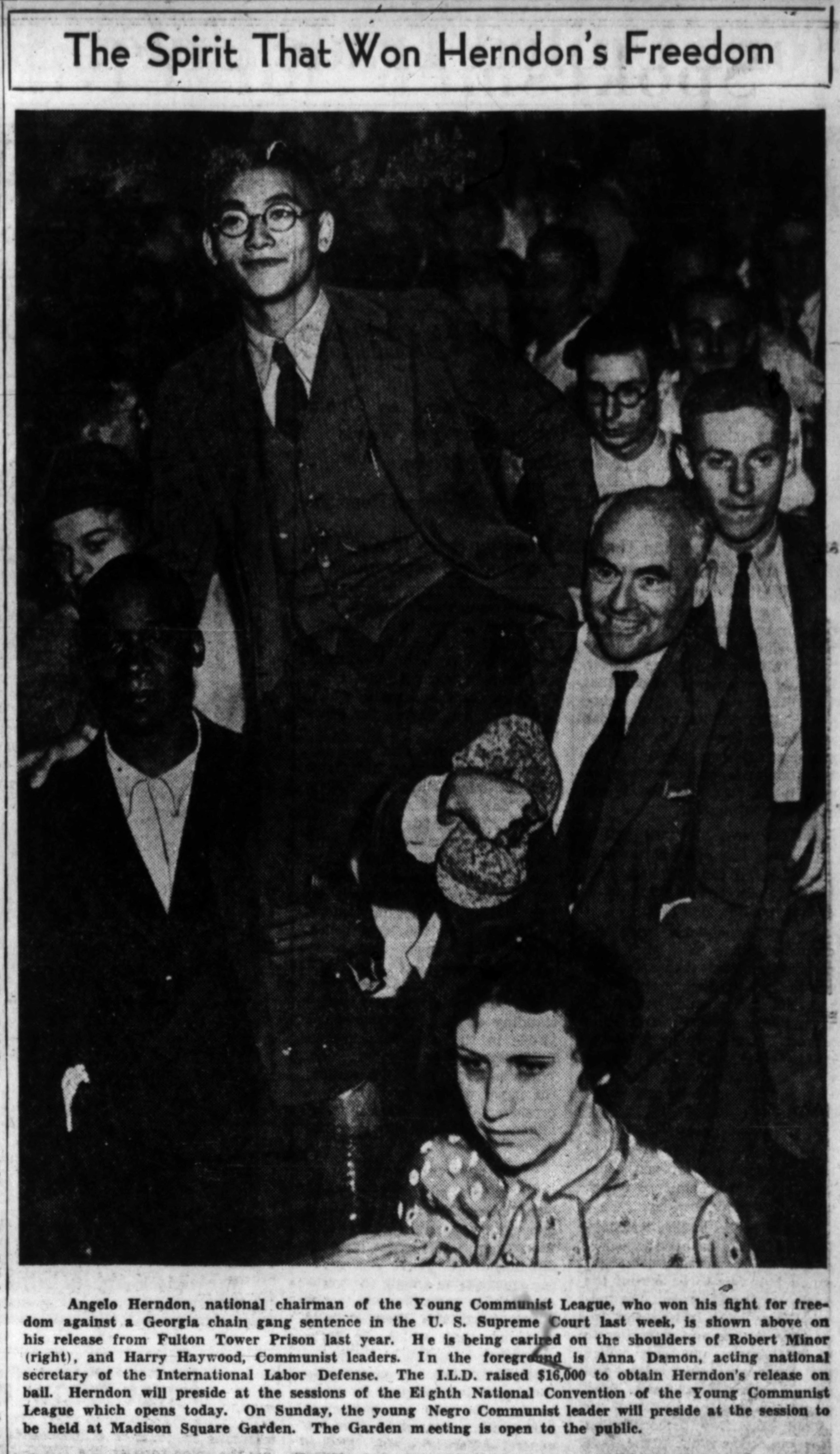
Haywood and Robert Minor lift Angelo Herndon on their shoulders following the Supreme Court ruling in his favor, April 1937

Hall began his revolutionary career by joining the African Blood Brotherhood in 1922, followed by the Young Communist League in 1923. Two years later he joined the Communist Party, USA (CPUSA), recruited by Robert Minor. Soon thereafter, Hall was sent to Moscow to "train as a revolutionary". At the time, he and his CPUSA friends believed they were targets of FBI scrutiny. When he applied for a passport, he chose to use an alias, "Harry Haywood". He said it was derived from his mother's first name (Harriet) and father's first name (Haywood), and that it would "stick with me the rest of my life."

In Moscow, Haywood studied first at the Communist University of the Toilers of the East in 1926, then at the International Lenin School in 1927. The anticolonial revolutionaries he met while in Moscow included Vietnamese leader Ho Chi Minh. Haywood began to advocate for the concerns of African-Americans, arguing that they were captives in the U.S. and "must embrace nationalism in order to avoid the harmful effects of integration." He stayed in the USSR until 1930 as a delegate to the Communist International (Comintern).

Haywood was General Secretary of the League of Struggle for Negro Rights, but was active in issues affecting working-class whites as well. In the early 1930s, while head of the CPUSA Negro Department, he led the movement to support the Scottsboro Boys, organized miners in West Virginia with the National Miners Union, and was a leader in the struggles of the militant Sharecroppers' Union in the Deep South. In 1935 he led the "Hands off Ethiopia" campaign in Chicago's Black South Side to oppose Italy's invasion of Ethiopia. In the 1936 House of Representatives elections, he was the CPUSA's candidate for the First Congressional District (encompassing the South Side of Chicago), but garnered only 899 votes.

Haywood served on the CPUSA's Central Committee from 1929 to 1938, and on its Politburo from 1931 to 1938. He was engaged in the Party's internal factional struggles against Jay Lovestone and Earl Browder, regularly siding with William Z. Foster. In 1949, when eleven Communist leaders were tried under the Smith Act, Haywood was assigned the task of performing research for their defense.

=== Comintern and the Black Belt nation ===
Map of the Black Belt Nation from Haywood's Negro Liberation, 1948.

During his four-year stay in the Soviet Union (1926–1930), Haywood traveled extensively in the Crimea, the Caucasus, and other autonomous republics. He got married in the USSR and became proficient in the Russian language. He participated in the struggles against both the Left Opposition headed by Leon Trotsky and the Right Opposition led by Nikolai Bukharin. In these struggles and in others, Haywood was on the side of Joseph Stalin. While working as a Comintern delegate, Haywood served on commissions drafting the "Native Republic Thesis" for the South African Communist Party, as well as addressing the plight of African Americans. He helped craft the "Comintern Resolutions on the Negro Question" of 1928 and 1930, which stated that African Americans in the South made up an oppressed nation, and therefore had the right to self-determination up to and including secession. He would continue to fight for this position throughout his life.

He believed that a distinct African-American nation had developed, which met the criteria laid out by Stalin in his Marxism and the National Question: a historically constituted, stable community of people, formed on the basis of a common language, territory, economic life, and psychological makeup manifested in a common culture. Because blacks in the South constituted such a nation, Haywood said the correct response was a demand for self-determination, including the right to separate from the U.S. and form an independent nation. But he disagreed with Marcus Garvey's "Back to Africa" separatist approach. Instead, Haywood argued that blacks deserved full equality in their own "national territory", which historically was the South. He stated that only with genuine political power—which in a Marxist sense included control of the land and other productive forces—could African Americans obtain genuine equality, which was a prerequisite for broader working-class unity.

Most CPUSA members who disagreed with Haywood considered the question of African-American oppression a matter of racial prejudice with moral roots, rather than an economic and political question of national oppression. They saw it as a problem to be solved under Socialism and in no need of special attention until after the institution of the revolutionary "dictatorship of the proletariat". They criticized Haywood for falling "into the bourgeois liberal trap of regarding the fight for equality as primarily a fight against racial prejudices of whites." To this charge, he countered that the category of "race" is a mystification. He believed that relying on race and ignoring economic questions could only alienate African Americans and inhibit working-class unity.

Following the Great Migration of millions of blacks to the U.S. Northeast, Midwest, and West, accompanied by their urbanization, critics attempted to use statistics to counter the Black Belt thesis and show that there no longer was a black nation centered in the South. In his 1957 article, "For a Revolutionary Position on the Negro Question", Haywood responded that the question of an oppressed nation in the South was not "mere nose counting".

Haywood's 1948 book Negro Liberation was described at the time as "the first comprehensive volume on the Negro question in the United States by a leading Negro Marxist". He argued that the root of the oppression of blacks was the unsolved agrarian question in the South. He believed that the unfinished bourgeois democratic revolution of Reconstruction had been betrayed in the Hayes-Tilden Compromise of 1877. It abandoned African Americans to plantations as tenant farmers and sharecroppers, faced with the Redeemer governments, the system of Jim Crow laws, and the terror of the Ku Klux Klan and other paramilitary groups. According to Haywood, the rise of imperialism left blacks frozen as "landless, semi-slaves in the South." According to Haywood's autobiography, Paul Robeson subsidized his work on the book by offering $100 a month. Negro Liberation was translated and published in Russian, Polish, German, Czech and Hungarian. It was reissued in 1976 by Liberator Press, the publishing arm of the October League. Haywood argued that:

the position of the book was not new, but a reaffirmation of the revolutionary position developed at the Sixth Comintern Congress in 1928. The heart of this position is that the problem is fundamentally a question of an oppressed nation with full rights of self-determination. It emphasized the revolutionary essence of the struggle for Black equality arising from the fact that the special oppression of Blacks is a main prop of the system of imperialist domination over the entire working class and the masses of exploited American people. Therefore the struggle for Black liberation is a component part of the struggle for proletarian revolution. It is the historic task of the working-class movement, as it advances on the road to socialism, to solve the problem of land and freedom of the Black masses.

Haywood added that "What was new in the book was the thorough analysis of the concrete conditions of Black people in the post-war period. I made extensive use of population data; the 1940 census, the 1947 Plantation Count and other sources, in order to show that the present day conditions affirmed the essential correctness of the position we had formulated years before." Because of this and other works, Robert F. Williams called Haywood "one of the modern pioneers in the Black liberation struggle."

=== Expulsion from the CPUSA ===
Following the death of Stalin in 1953 and Nikita Khrushchev's rise to power, the CPUSA embraced Khrushchev's policy of destalinization and "peaceful coexistence". Long an admirer of Mao Zedong, Haywood was an early champion of the anti-revisionist movement born out of the growing Sino-Soviet split. He was driven out of the CPUSA in the late 1950s along with many others who took firm anti-revisionist or pro-Stalin positions.

The CPUSA's decision to change its position on the African-American national question was also a key factor in Haywood's expulsion. Though the CPUSA had not been as active in the South since the dissolution of the Sharecroppers Union, in 1959 the Party officially dropped its demand for self-determination in the South for African Americans. (The demand had been briefly abandoned in 1944 when Earl Browder liquidated the Party.) The CPUSA instead held that as American capitalism developed, so too would Black-White unity.

In 1957, Haywood wrote the polemic, "For a Revolutionary Position on the Negro Question", but he was unsuccessful at altering the Party's direction. By 1959, although no longer a functioning Party member, he attempted to intervene one last time. He wrote "On the Negro Question", which was distributed at the Seventeenth National Convention by and in the name of African Blood Brotherhood founder Cyril Briggs. Haywood's effort was not effective, however, as most of his potential allies had already been expelled from the CPUSA as part of its purge of "left"-sectarianism and dogmatism.

In Haywood's view, "white chauvinism" in the Party, rather than an accurate analysis of the economic issues, had caused the Party's change in position regarding African-American self-determination. He argued that the change prevented the CPUSA from giving appropriate leadership as the civil rights movement developed. He believed the Party was lagging behind the actions of Dr. Martin Luther King Jr. and the NAACP. The Party would become even more alienated from the militant Black Power movement that was to follow.

=== Subsequent political activities ===
Haywood and his wife Gwendolyn Midlo Hall were among the founders of the Provisional Organizing Committee for a Communist Party (POC), formed in New York City in August 1958 by 83 mostly Black and Puerto Rican and white trade unionists, mainly coal miners from Williamsport, Pennsylvania and maritime workers. Its membership included Theodore W. Allen, best known later for his "White skin privilege" theory. According to Haywood, the POC rapidly degenerated into an isolated, dogmatic, ultraleft sect, completely removed from any political practice. Nevertheless, the POC did release many highly trained organizers from the dead hand of the CPUSA as the civil rights and the black power movement began to hit the streets. In 1964, Haywood worked in Harlem with Jesse Gray, leader of the Harlem Rent Strike and Tenants' Union later elected to the New York State Legislature from Harlem. Haywood worked with Malcolm X in 1964 until his assassination in 1965, and with James Haughton and Josh Lawrence in Harlem Fight-Back, then in Oakland, California, in 1966, then in Detroit, Michigan, with the Detroit Revolutionary Union Movement (DRUM) and the League of Revolutionary Black Workers. Next, Haywood left for Mexico for a short time before returning permanently to the U.S. in 1970. He had been invited by Vincent Harding, Director of the Institute for the Black World in Atlanta, Georgia.

In 1964, Haywood began his involvement with the New Communist movement. Its goal was to found a vanguard Communist Party on an anti-revisionist basis, believing the CPUSA to have deviated irrevocably from Marxism-Leninism. He later worked in one of the newly formed Maoist groups of the New Communist movement, the October League, which became the Communist Party (Marxist-Leninist) (CPML). Haywood served on its Central Committee.

In 1978, he published his autobiography, Black Bolshevik, although some of his important writings and political life during the 1960s were edited out. For example, the manuscript he had written in acknowledged collaboration with Gwendolyn Midlo Hall, and dedicated to Robert F. Williams, was not mentioned. This work, which circulated in mimeographed form from early 1964 throughout California and in the Deep South, influenced the armed self-defense movement against the Ku Klux Klan during 1964 and 1965, and projected a slogan widely picked up throughout the South that leftists must pose their own challenge to order and stability to counter the challenge posed by the "massive resistance" of Southern politicians and racist terrorists. Black Bolshevik became an important book cited by scholars and read by the wider public. Through it and his other writings, Haywood provided ideological leadership far beyond the New Communist movement. His theoretical contributions had an impact on the warring factions of the left, including the League of Revolutionary Struggle (Marxist-Leninist), the early Revolutionary Communist Party, the Revolutionary Workers Headquarters and the Communist Workers Party. Nonetheless, lack of experience, sectarianism, and voluntarism were a major factor in keeping the young Maoist groups from taking a leadership role. In his last published article, Haywood wrote that the New Communist movement spent too much time and energy seeking the "franchise" of governments and parties outside the U.S. without validating itself among the people of its own country.

Haywood's theoretical innovations have been influential in many areas including historical materialism, geography, Marxist education, and social movement theory. His contributions to questions of African-American national oppression and national liberation were highly valued by the Ray O. Light Group, which developed out of an anti-revisionist split from the CPUSA in 1961, the Freedom Road Socialist Organization, which was formed from the mergers of several New Communist movement groups in the 1980s, the Maoist Internationalist Movement, and other black revolutionaries and activists.

== Personal life ==
Haywood was married four times, first in 1920 to a Chicago woman named Hazel, but they soon separated. In December 1926 in the USSR, he met Ekaterina (known as "Ina"), a ballet student and English interpreter. They married the following year, but the marriage did not last beyond his stay in the country, as he was unable to obtain an exit visa for her to return with him to the U.S. In Los Angeles in 1940, while recovering from a heart attack he had suffered the previous year, Haywood reconnected with Belle Lewis, whom he had worked with during a National Miners Union strike in Kentucky in 1931. They married in 1940 and divorced in 1955.

In 1956, he married Gwendolyn Midlo, a Jewish civil rights activist from New Orleans, Louisiana. She later became a prominent historian of slavery in the U.S. and Latin America, and of the African diaspora. They had two children together, Haywood Hall (b. 1956) and Rebecca Hall (b. 1963). Between 1953 and 1964, Haywood and Midlo Hall collaborated on multiple articles, including some published in Soulbook, a Berkeley-based magazine. In 1959, shortly before his expulsion from the Communist Party, Haywood and his family moved to Mexico City where they stayed through the 1960s. After late 1964, Haywood and Midlo Hall were mostly living apart, although they remained married until his death. She did not follow him into the New Communist movement.

=== Death ===
Haywood had a service-related disability and spent the last year of his life at a Veterans Administration medical facility. He died on January 4, 1985 of cardiac arrest, after a prolonged battle against a severe form of asthma. He was buried in Arlington National Cemetery in Arlington, Virginia. (Columbarium Court 1, Section LL, Column 7, 2nd Row from bottom. Interred under birth name "Haywood Hall.")

== Legacy ==
The Harry Haywood papers are housed at the Bentley Historical Library, University of Michigan, and at the Manuscript, Archives, and Rare Books Division of the Schomburg Center for Research in Black Culture in New York City.

In Richard Wright's autobiographical novel Black Boy (American Hunger), the rigid CPUSA leader Buddy Nealson is said to represent Haywood; it is an unflattering portrayal that was a source of conflict between Haywood and Wright.

== Selected works ==
- The Communist Position on the Negro Question. With Earl Browder and Clarence Hathaway. New York: Workers Library Publishers, 1931.
- "Lynching: A Weapon of National Oppression" (PDF). New York: International Pamphlets. 1932. Co-authored with Milton Howard.
- The Road to Negro Liberation (PDF). Report to the Eighth Convention of the Communist Party of the USA. New York: Workers Library Publishers. 1934.
- "The South Comes North in Detroit's Own Scottsboro Case" (PDF). Detroit: League of Struggle for Negro Rights. May 1934.
- Negro Liberation. New York: International Publishers. 1948. Reissued by Liberator Press, Chicago, 1976.
- "For a Revolutionary Position on the Negro Question". 1957. Reissued by Liberator Press, Chicago, 1977.
- "Selected Works of Harry Haywood". University of Massachusetts. Articles from Soulbook, 1965–1967.
- Black Bolshevik: Autobiography of an Afro-American Communist. Chicago: Liberator Press, 1978.
- "Black Power and the Fight for Socialism". Class Struggle. No. 11. Winter 1979.
- "A Comment by Harry Haywood". A House Divided: Labor and White Supremacy. New York: United Labor Press. 1981. pp. 139–143. LCCN 81050425. OCLC 8110706.

== See also ==
- Communists in the United States Labor Movement (1919–37)
- Communists in the United States Labor Movement (1937–50)
- The Communist Party USA and African-Americans
- Civil rights movement (1896–1954)
- Timeline of Racial Tension in Omaha, Nebraska
- Black nationalism
- Black separatism
- Black radical tradition

== Sources ==
- Max Elbaum, Revolution in the Air: Sixties Radicals Turn to Lenin, Mao, and Che. New York: Verso, 2006. ISBN 978-1844675630.
- William Z. Foster, History of the Communist Party of the United States. New York: International Publishers, 1952. LCCN 52-12425.
- Lance Hill, Deacons for Defense: Armed Resistance and the Civil Rights Movement. Chapel Hill, NC: University of North Carolina Press, 2004. ISBN 978-0807828472.
- Robin D. G. Kelley, Hammer and Hoe: Alabama Communists During the Great Depression. Chapel Hill, NC: University of North Carolina Press, 1990. ISBN 978-0807819210.
- William Eric Perkins, "Haywood, Harry (1898-1985)", in Mari Jo Buhle, Paul Buhle, Dan Georgakas, Eds. Encyclopedia of the American Left (2nd ed.). New York: Oxford University Press, 1998. ISBN 978-0195120882.
- Cedric J. Robinson, Black Marxism: The Making of the Black Radical Tradition. Chapel Hill, NC: University of North Carolina Press, 2000. ISBN 978-0807848296.
