= African Blood Brotherhood =

Radical black liberation organization founded in New York City

Logo of the ABB, featuring the Rock of Gibraltar

The African Blood Brotherhood for African Liberation and Redemption (ABB) was a U.S. black liberation organization established in 1919 in New York City by journalist Cyril Briggs. The group was established as a propaganda organization built on the model of the secret society. The group's socialist orientation caught the attention of the fledgling American communist movement and the ABB soon evolved into a propaganda arm of the Communist Party of America. The group was terminated in the early 1920s.

== Background ==
During the second decade of the 20th century, a socialist movement for the liberation of American blacks began to develop in the Harlem section of New York City. The movement included a substantial number of immigrants from the British West Indies and other islands from the Caribbean region, who, having been raised and educated as part of a racial majority population in their homelands, had found themselves thrust into the position of an oppressed racial minority in America. As products of the unequal system of colonialism, many of these newcomers to America were predisposed to hostility towards capitalism and the notion of empire-building.

One of these transplants from the Caribbean was Cyril Briggs, born in 1888 on the island of Nevis, who immigrated to Harlem in the summer of 1905. In 1912, Briggs was hired as a journalist by one of the black community's leading newspapers, the New York Amsterdam News. He worked there throughout the years of the First World War. Inspired by the rhetoric of "national self-determination" espoused by President Woodrow Wilson, in September 1918 Briggs launched a monthly publication called The Crusader, to promote the idea of "repatriation" of blacks to a decolonized Africa.

The Crusader was started by George Wells Parker, a black businessman from Omaha, Nebraska, as the official organ of the League of Legends, a pan-African nationalist group. Parker published articles in the journal proclaiming that Africa was the cradle of civilization and arguing the superiority of the black race. He contributed financially to the publication, which was essentially a vehicle for his views.

In February 1919, Briggs began to change his ideas, and his new thinking was expressed in articles in the Crusader. He began to draw parallels between the plight of black workers in the United States and impoverished working class whites, who were mostly recent immigrants or their descendants from Europe. Over ensuing months, Briggs began to consider the system of capitalism as the villain, and he argued in favor of a common cause and common action by workers of all races.

The Crusader eventually reached a total readership of 36,000 persons, mostly in Harlem.

== Establishment of organization ==
The summer of 1919 in America was a time of racial rioting and violence, remembered retrospectively by historians as the "Red Summer." Returning soldiers from European battlefields, including blacks with heightened expectations of freedom and equality and whites seeking a return to civilian employment and the status quo ante bellum, and new immigrant black workers from the rural South formed a volatile mixture which erupted in mob violence in Chicago, Omaha, and cities throughout the Northeast, Midwest and South.

In response to these attacks, The Crusader advocated armed self-defense. Politically, Briggs drew comparisons between government attacks on white and black radicals. He identified capitalism as the underlying cause of oppression of poor people of all races. While endorsing a Marxist analysis, The Crusader advocated a separate organization of African-Americans to defend against racist attacks in the United States, and likened this to Africans' combating colonialism abroad.

In September 1919, The Crusader announced the formation of a new organization called the African Blood Brotherhood (ABB), to serve as a self-defense organization for blacks threatened by race riots and lynchings. This was accompanied by the re-publishing of Claude McKay's poem If We Must Die.

Not long afterwards, Briggs began to forge connections with pioneer black American Communists such as the Surinam-born Otto Huiswoud and Jamaican poet and writer Claude McKay. These in turn connected Briggs and his publication with native-born white Communists including Robert Minor and Rose Pastor Stokes, who took a strong interest in the so-called "Negro Question." Briggs would join the Communist Party himself in 1921.

== Conflicts with Marcus Garvey and the Bureau of Investigation ==
The ABB attempted to organize from inside the UNIA-ACL and advocated a policy of critical support for its leader, Marcus Garvey. ABB leaders Briggs and Claude McKay participated in the UNIA's 1920 and 1921 international conferences in New York. At the second conference, McKay arranged for Rose Pastor Stokes, a white leader of the Communist Party, to address the assembly.

The ABB became highly critical of Garvey following the apparent failure of the Black Star Line and Garvey's July 1921 Atlanta meeting with Grand Kleagle Clarke of the Ku Klux Klan. In June 1922, The Crusader announced that it had become the official organ of the African Blood Brotherhood. Arguing that the UNIA was doomed unless it developed new leadership, the magazine sought to convert the UNIA's membership to the ABB. In seeking to replace the UNIA, the ABB competed with Randolph's socialist publication The Messenger, which had called for Garvey's expulsion from the United States. In return, Garvey called for his followers to disrupt meetings of these oppositional groups.

In addition to the dispute with Garvey, Briggs and the ABB were targeted for investigation by police and federal law enforcement agencies. Historian Theodore Kornweibel reports that the government began manipulating radical organizations in conjunction with legal prosecution under the pretence of disrupting opposition to World War I. Following the end of the war, a government campaign against communists, anarchists, and other radicals was instituted at the direction of Attorney General A. Mitchell Palmer (himself the victim of two anarchist bomb attacks) in what came to be called the First Red Scare. Government agents were secretly planted in the UNIA, ABB and The Messenger. These agents provided intelligence to the Bureau of Investigation while in some case sabotaging meetings, and acting as agents provocateurs.

The ABB enjoyed a period of notoriety following the Tulsa race massacre of 1921. Tulsa had an ABB chapter and news reports credited the organization with inspiring resistance to racist attacks. See: The New York Times June 5th 1921.

== Fusion with Communist Party ==
The Crusader ceased publication in February 1922, following Garvey's indictment for mail fraud. Briggs continued to operate the Crusader News Service, providing news material to affiliated publications of the American black press. As cooperation with the Communist Party increased, the ABB ceased to recruit separately.

The leadership of the Communist International, while largely ignorant about the particulars of the situation of blacks in the United States, did assert the importance of ethnic and other non-class forms of oppression, and pushed the early CP to pay more attention to blacks in the U.S. Before this intervention by the Comintern, the party had largely ignored blacks, and thus was not particularly attractive to black radicals like Briggs. Instead, it was the Bolshevik Revolution that attracted their attention.

Poet and ABB member Claude McKay had previously been active in the Left Communist Workers Socialist Federation in London and subsequently visited the Soviet Union several times in the mid-1920s, writing about conferences of the Communist International for African-American audiences. McKay's book, The Negroes in America (published in Russian in 1924 but not in the U.S. until 1979) argued, against the official Communist position of the time, that the oppression of black people in the U.S. was not reducible to economic oppression, but was unique. He argued against the color blindness that the Communists had inherited from the Socialist Party.

McKay argued vociferously for national self-determination in support of national independence for oppressed peoples, which to him meant an independent African-American government separate and apart from that of the United States. Subsequently, in the aftermath of the Sixth Comintern Congress in 1928, the CPUSA adopted a policy of national self-determination for African-Americans living in the American South. The policy was neglected after the Popular Front period began in 1935, but was not formally replaced until 1959.

As the Communist Party developed, it regularized its structure along the lines called for by the Communist International (Comintern). Semi-independent organizations such as the African Blood Brotherhood with its divergent Afro-Marxist political theories were anathema to the Comintern and its Soviet leaders, who believed all communist and Marxist–Leninist organizations should be unified in a single communist party and platform in each nation under Moscow's overall direction and control. In the early 1920s the African Blood Brotherhood was dissolved, with its members merged into the Workers Party of America and later into the American Negro Labor Congress. Many early ABB members, however, went on to be key CP cadres for decades.

== Membership ==
The ABB had a total membership of fewer than 3,000 members at its peak.

== See also ==
- The Communist Party and African-Americans
- Harry Haywood
- Alternative press
- Black separatism
- Black nationalism
