= American Negro Labor Congress =

Congress established to advance the rights of African Americans

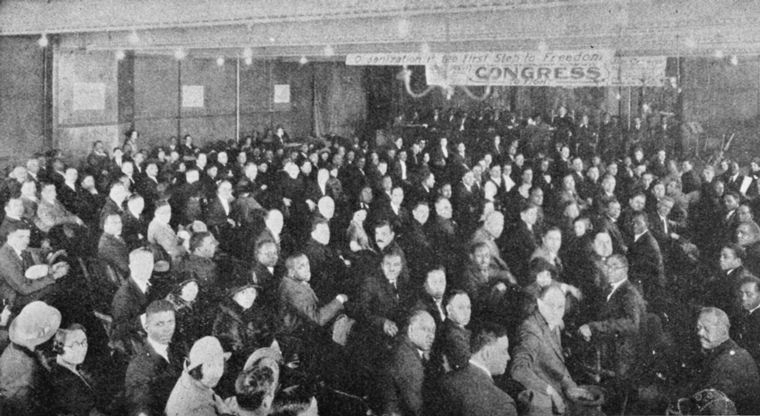
News photograph of American Negro Labor Congress meeting from Vanguard Press, c. 1929

The American Negro Labor Congress was established in 1925 by the Communist Party as a vehicle for advancing the rights of African Americans, propagandizing for communism within the black community and recruiting African American members for the party.

The organization attacked the segregationist practices of many of the unions affiliated with the American Federation of Labor; it also campaigned against lynching, the disfranchisement of black Americans, and Jim Crow laws. The group was renamed the League of Struggle for Negro Rights in 1930.

== Organizational history ==
=== Background ===
The first mass organization of the American Communist Party dedicated to advancing issues of importance to American blacks and building a party presence within the black community was the African Blood Brotherhood (ABB). The ABB was established independently of the nascent Communist movement but had been formally brought under party auspices as a byproduct of its need for funding. In 1923, the tiny New York City-based organization was formally integrated into the structure of the Workers Party of America, as the party was then known. The group's handful of activists had proven insufficient to maintain critical mass, however, and by 1924 the ABB had been virtually dissolved.

American Communists had been ineffectual in its efforts to build a significant mass organization among American blacks during the first half decade of the movement's existence and the Communist International prodded the Workers Party to begin a new initiative to establish a group able to mobilize black workers. The result of this push was the establishment of a new organization called the American Negro Labor Congress.

According to historian Maria Gertrudis van Enckevort, archival evidence indicates that the idea for the new mass organization directed to American blacks came from Lovett Fort-Whiteman, a national organizer for the ABB who had been sent to Moscow by the summer of 1924 for ideological and technical training. Fort-Whiteman complained in an October 1924 letter to head of the Comintern Gregory Zinoviev about the lack of work being conducted by the American Communist and repeated a call to act on a plan he had submitted to the Far Eastern Section of the Comintern seeking convocation of an "American Negro Labor Congress."

This idea found support among Comintern decision-makers and in December 1924 a communication was passed on to the Workers Party of America, current name of the Communist Party, stating "it has been proposed to call an American Negro Labour Congress at Chicago, to be held sometime during the summer" and seeking the American party's advice.

=== Convention call ===
Lovett Fort-Whiteman opened the founding convention of the ANLC, October 25, 1925.

The call for the American Negro Labor Congress was issued late in the spring of 1925 with the proposal emanating from the Workers (Communist) Party. Although the convention call vaguely established "some time in the summer" for the time of the gathering, in actuality the founding convention did not take place in Chicago until October 25, 1925. There were 17 signatories of the convention call, of whom six were members of the Workers Party.

The communists sought to use front tactics by downplaying their own presence and casting the ANLC as a multi-tendency organization, thereby reducing the chance of the group's ability to challenge the NAACP and the Marcus Garvey's UNIA as the paramount voice of the black working class. The convention call indicated that delegates must represent black or interracial trade unions, farm workers, or unorganized factory workers — although provision was made for participation by "individual advocates" engaged in promoting "the cause of the working class."

The man most directly responsible for the idea of the new group, Lovett Fort-Whiteman was named its national organizer. Fort-Whiteman had been a delegate to the 5th World Congress of the Comintern in 1924 and the recipient of a crash course in party organization at the International Lenin School in Moscow and was regarded as one of the party's leading black cadres.

American-born and educated at the Tuskegee Institute, the veteran former member of the Socialist Party of America Fort-Whiteman had been selected to lead the new group over other top black Communists, including Cyril Briggs, Richard B. Moore, and Otto Huiswoud.

Fort-Whiteman, who sometimes wrote under the pseudonym "James Jackson," was the advocate of the idea of convening an "American-Negro Labor Congress" at Chicago to bring together black workers from around the country and had written to Moscow in an attempt to win support for the idea from the Far-Eastern Section of the Comintern. Fort-Whiteman sought "to approach the negro on his own mental grounds" by concentrating activity on fighting racism in American society, the prevalence of which Fort-Whiteman believed dulled black Americans' sense of class consciousness and immunized them to calls for class struggle.

The call for the founding convention consequently touched upon not only matters of importance to labor in general but also spoke to specifically racial interests such as the "abolition of Jim Crowism," an end to electoral restrictions disfranchising blacks, enforcement of "the right of the Negro to equal accommodations with whites in all theaters, restaurants, hotels, etc.," an end to discrimination in education, and Congressional action to make lynching a federal crime.

=== Establishment ===
Defrocked Episcopalian bishop William Montgomery Brown delivered a speech to the founding convention of the ANLC.

The founding convention of the American Negro Labor Congress opened on the evening of Sunday, October 25, 1925, with a mass meeting which heard the reports of national organizer Fort-Whitman and national secretary H.V. Williams. Fort-Whitman's keynote speech declared that the new organization was established "to gather, to mobilize, and to coordinate into a fighting machine the most enlightened and militant and class-conscious workers of the race" in support of concrete objectives.

Approximately 40 delegates attended the founding congress of the ANLC, which was organized around the slogan "Organization is the first step to freedom." Delegate Otto Huiswood, a prominent black Communist party activist from New York, emphasized the need to bring black workers into the trade unions of the American Federation of Labor, declaring that if the established unions could not be racially integrated, it would fall to black workers to establish parallel unions of their own.

The October 1925 founding convention passed resolutions demanding "the full equality of the Negro people in the social system of the United States, and everywhere." An end to Jim Crow laws, segregation, electoral discrimination, and discrimination in public education was demanded and discrimination in housing and public accommodation duly noted as part of a demand for "full social equality for the Negro people. The Ku Klux Klan was condemned and the exclusion of black jurors from the juries picked for the trials of black defendants was sharply criticized, as was continued segregation in the United States military.

At the founding convention was announced that 10 American blacks were already in Moscow enrolled at the University of the Toilers of the East, where they were ostensibly being trained for work in the Soviet "diplomatic service." The delegates also heard an enthusiastic speech delivered by "Bad Bishop" William Montgomery Brown, who hammered the capitalist class and declared that "the Christian church was started by workers and you workers must take it back."

Behind the scenes the governing National Executive Committee of the ANLC was instructed by the Comintern to convene a "World Race Conference," in an effort to internationalize the black liberation movement — a repetition of an unsuccessful effort by the Comintern to hold an international race conference made in 1922. Such a congress was to be held with a view to establishing a world organization of black workers and farmers which would unite exploited colonial populations to overthrow imperialism, the Comintern indicated.

The Comintern also participated in the ANLC financially, budgeting $2,500 for organizers' salaries, travel expenses, and the production of pamphlets and leaflets. This was no great change in previous practice, as from the perspective of the Comintern and the American Communist Party the ANLC merely replaced the moribund African Blood Brotherhood, an entity which was a previous recipient of financial support.

=== Reaction of white labor movement ===
The officialdom of the American Federation of Labor was hostile to the new ANLC, with AFL President William Green cautioning black unionists that they were "being led into a trap." Green charged that the Communists were attempting to foster "race hatred into the lives" of African Americans and to trick blacks into believing that the revolutionary overthrow of the American government and its replacement with a Soviet republic was the sole solution to their social ills.

Green's attitude drew return fire from the ANLC, which called the AFL chief's position "clearly erroneous, harmful, and prejudicial to the best interests of the American labor movement."

Despite such protestations, the mainstream press of America echoed Green's hostile sentiments, with the Chicago Tribune accusing the Communists of attempting to "stir up race hatred and disorder" and the Philadelphia Record rejecting the entire idea that American blacks could be "bolshevized" as "ridiculously childish."

=== Discord within ANLC ===
In addition to external hostility, a spirit of factionalism and personal strife existed within the ranks of the ANLC. The selection of Fort-Whiteman as leader by the Comintern had proven controversial, as he seemed to leapfrog long-time party activists with impeccable bona fides, including Moore, Huiswoud, and Briggs. This situation was exacerbated by Fort-Whiteman's own growing sense of self-importance, his tendency to make decisions by fiat, and his propensity to wear grandiose Russian garb. A steady stream of complaints about Fort-Whiteman to the Negro Commission of the Workers (Communist) Party followed, sidetracking the organization's work.

The Workers (Communist) Party also mishandled the ANLC's operations, moving the group's headquarters from the black Chicago South Side to an all-white neighborhood, failing to issue the group's newspaper in a timely manner, and making overly clear in the group's literature its connection to the widely distrusted national communist organization. The result was a very nearly stillborn ANLC, with only seven functioning branches by the summer of 1926.

=== Activities ===
The official organ of the American Negro Labor Congress was a newspaper called The Negro Champion, published in New York. In 1929 this was succeeded by a new publication, a magazine called The Liberator.

=== Dissolution ===
In 1930, the American Negro Labor Congress was terminated through the initiative of the Communist Party and replaced by a new organization called the League of Struggle for Negro Rights.

== See also ==
- African Blood Brotherhood
- Colored Conventions Movement

== Publications ==
- Constitution and Program of the American Negro Labor Congress: Adopted at its First Annual Convention, Chicago, Ill., October 25–31, 1925. Chicago, IL: American Negro Labor Congress, 1925.
