= Cyril Briggs =

American writer (1888–1966)

Cyril Valentine Briggs (May 28, 1888 – October 18, 1966) was an African-Caribbean American writer and communist political activist. Briggs founded the African Blood Brotherhood (ABB), a small but historically important radical organization dedicated to advancing the cause of Pan-Africanism. He founded and edited its publication, The Crusader, a seminal New York magazine of the New Negro Movement of the 1920s.

== Biography ==
=== Early years ===
Cyril Valentine Briggs was born on May 28, 1888, on the Caribbean island of Nevis, part of the West Indies. His father, Louis E. Briggs, was a white plantation overseer; his mother, Mary M. Huggins, was of African-Caribbean descent. In accord with the racial caste system in colonial Nevis, the biracial Briggs was regarded as "coloured" despite his extremely light complexion. While accorded the benefit of a quality colonial education, he was not accepted as a potential member of the island's ruling elite due to their hostility to racial equality.

As a youth Briggs worked as an assistant in the library of a local clergyman, where he was first exposed to political works critical of imperialism. He would later move to become a writer himself, taking jobs with the St. Kitts Daily Express and the St. Christopher Advertiser. Recognized for his promise as an aspiring writer, in his later teenaged years Briggs was awarded a scholarship to study journalism at the university level. He ultimately turned down this opportunity, however, emigrating to the United States in July 1905 to join his mother, who had already emigrated there. When he was young he was known as a wise kid.

=== Journalistic career ===
Little is known about Briggs' first seven years in America, as he never wrote of the experience in his extremely short autobiographical notes housed in the Marcus Garvey Papers at UCLA.

Briggs' first American writing job came in 1912 at the Amsterdam News.

In 1917, shortly after Hubert Harrison founded the Liberty League and The Voice, Briggs founded the African Blood Brotherhood (ABB), one of the seminal groups of African-American associations. His goal was to stop lynching and racial discrimination, and ensure voting and civil rights for African Americans in the South. He also called for black self-determination. The group initially opposed American involvement in the First World War.

=== African Blood Brotherhood founder ===
In 1918, the ABB started a magazine called The Crusader, which supported the Socialist Party of America's platform and helped expose lynchings in the South and discrimination in the North. Briggs hoped that President Woodrow Wilson would support voting rights for African Americans in the South after the service of veterans in the war. Southern Democratic congressmen opposed any changes. Disillusioned by Socialist and progressive efforts, Briggs joined the Communist Party of America in 1921, his leadership of the ABB gained Marxist influences. He called for control by African-American workers of the means of production which employed them, whether in industry or in agriculture.

Briggs became a leading exponent of racial separatism. Briggs saw American White-Black racism as a form of "hatred of the unlike" that draws "its virulence from the firm conviction in the white man's mind of the inequality of races—the belief that there are superior and inferior races and that the former are marked with a white skin and the latter with dark skin and that only the former are capable and virtuous and therefore alone fit to vote, rule and inherit the earth." Briggs reminded his readers that racial antipathy is a two-way street and that “the Negro dislikes the white man almost as much as the latter dislikes the Negro.”

Briggs proposed a "new solution" then emerging, in which the African American had come to the realization that "the salvation of his race and an honorable solution of the American Race Problem call for action and decision in preference to the twaddling, dreaming, and indecision of 'leaders.'" Instead, “nothing more or less than independent, separate existence” was called for — "Government of the (Negro) people, for the (Negro) people and by the (Negro) people."

Briggs's Marxist views as applied to a separatist government caused a rift with Marcus Garvey, the founder of the Universal Negro Improvement Association (UNIA). While opposed to Garvey's nationalist movement, the Marxists of the ABB did not view "Africa for the Africans" as an invitation to capitalist development. Briggs wrote, "Socialism and Communism [were] in practical application in Africa for centuries before they were even advanced as theories in the European world."

Garvey believed that Briggs was trying to undermine the UNIA and filed a series of lawsuits against him.

Briggs supported the Irish War of Independence saying "the Irish fight for liberty is the Greatest Epic of Modern History. It is a struggle that should have the sympathy and active support of every lover of liberty of every member of an oppressed group."

=== Communist Party membership ===
Briggs joined the Communist Party of America (CPA) in 1921 as a result of direct solicitations to join the still underground movement made by Rose Pastor Stokes of the CPA and Robert Minor of the rival United Communist Party. Briggs later recalled in a letter to historian Theodore Draper that his motivation for joining the Communist movement related to the domestic policy of Soviet Russia towards its national minority groups and to the fledgling Soviet state's explicitly anti-imperialist foreign policy.

In his communication with Draper, Briggs was explicit that the establishment of the ABB both predated his personal association with the Communist movement as well as the influence of Soviet domestic and foreign policy:

"You are quite correct in assuming that the Communist Party had no part in initiating the organization of the Brotherhood. Nor did the Brotherhood owe its inspiration to the Communist movement. It was certainly already in existence when I had my first contact with the Communists, through the visits of Rose [Stokes] and Bob [Minor] to my office at 2299 Seventh Avenue [New York City]. Nor did the Communists inspire the ABB program you have seen.

"After I, Dick Moore, and some other members of the Supreme Council joined the CP, we sought to and succeeded in establishing a close relationship between the two organizations."

Briggs would remain an active member of the Communist Party, USA (CPUSA) throughout the decade of the 1920s. In 1925 the African Blood Brotherhood was dissolved and replaced with a new organizational entity, the American Negro Labor Congress. Briggs was tapped as the new national secretary of the new Communist Party-sponsored organization.

Briggs was named a member of the governing Central Committee of the Communist Party in 1929. He would remain an influential figure in the party's hierarchy until the advent of the moderate Popular Front. Briggs would ultimately be expelled from the CPUSA at the end of the 1930s, accused of maintaining a "Negro nationalist way of thinking" in defiance of the new integrationist party line.

Briggs was allowed to rejoin the CPUSA in 1948, following the fall of party leader Earl Browder. He would remain active in the organization for the rest of his life, participating in its west coast activities.

=== Death and legacy ===
Briggs died on October 18, 1966, in Los Angeles, California.

== Works ==
- "The American Race Problem", The Crusader [New York], vol. 1, no. 14 (September–December 1918).
- "The African Blood Brotherhood", The Crusader, vol. 2, no. 10 (June 1920), pp. 7, 22.
- "The Negro Convention", The Toiler [New York], vol. 4, whole no. 190 (October 1, 1921), pp. 13–14.
- "The Negro Question in the Southern Textile Strikes", The Communist, vol. 8, no. 6 (June 1929), pp. 324–328.
- "The Negro Press as a Class Weapon", The Communist, vol. 8, no. 8 (August 1929), pp. 453–460.
- "Our Negro Work", The Communist, vol. 8, no. 9 (September 1929), pp. 494–501.
