= Amy Garvey =

Amy Garvey may refer to:

- Amy Ashwood Garvey, Pan-Africanist activist and first wife of Marcus Garvey
- Amy Jacques Garvey, Pan-Africanist writer and second wife of Marcus Garvey
