= People's Political Party =

People's Political Party can refer to several political parties:

- People's Party of Canada (Federal Canadian political party)
- People's Political Party (Jamaica)
- People's Political Party (Saint Vincent and the Grenadines)
- People's Political Party (Poland)
- People's Political Party of Britain
- The People's Political Party (Ontario, Canada)
