= Marcus Garvey =

Jamaican activist and orator (1887–1940)

The Right Excellent Marcus Garvey ONH
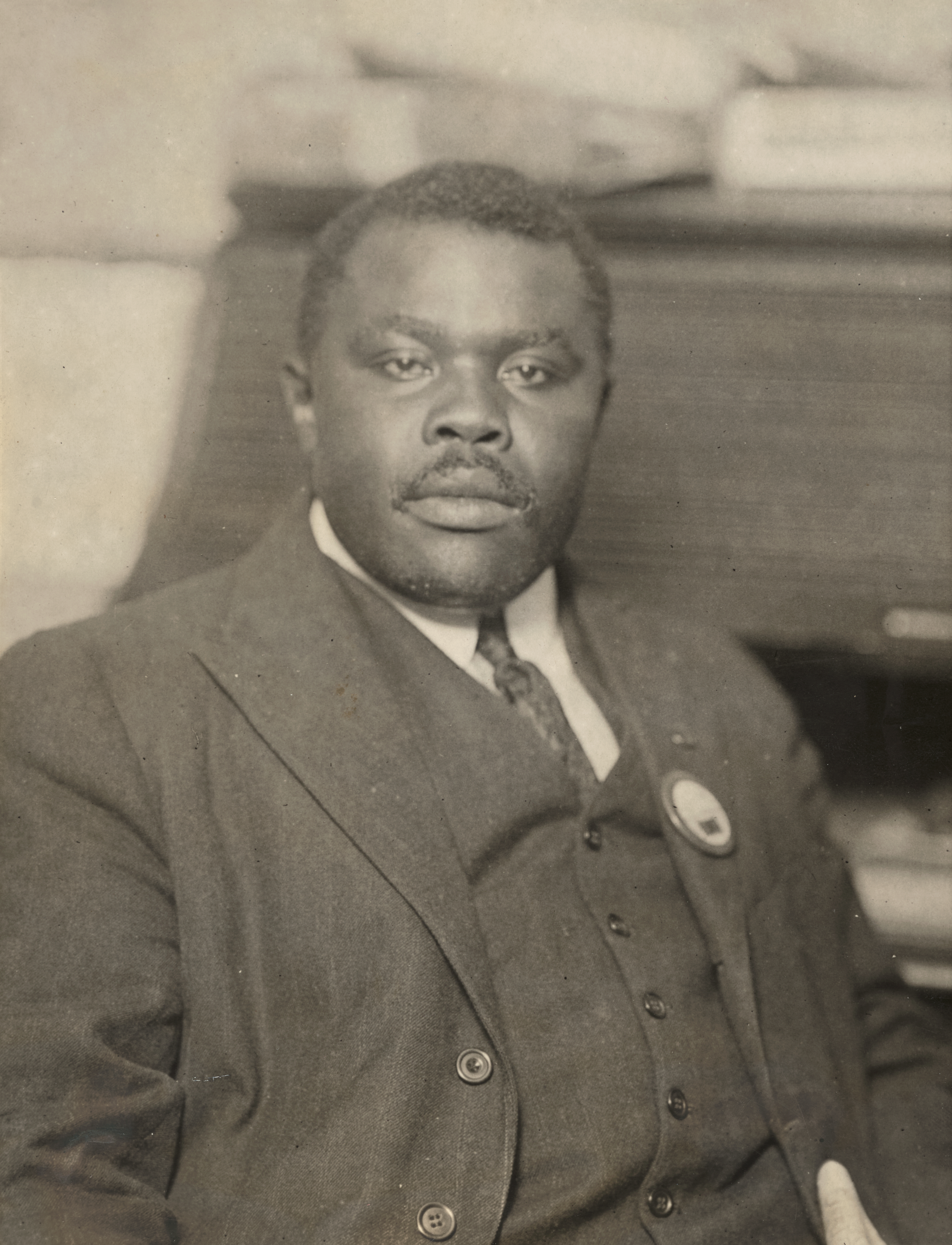
- Garvey in c. 1920
- Born: Marcus Mosiah Garvey; 17 August 1887; Saint Ann's Bay, Jamaica
- Died: 10 June 1940 (aged 52); London, England
- Resting place: National Heroes Park; Kingston, Jamaica
- Education: Birkbeck, University of London
- Occupations: Publisher, journalist, entrepreneur
- Known for: Activism, Black nationalism, Pan-Africanism
- Spouses: Amy Ashwood (m. 1919; div. 1922) * Amy Jacques (m. 1922)
- Children: 2 including Julius Garvey
- "Explanation of the Objects of the Universal Negro Improvement Association", Recorded in July 1921

Marcus Mosiah Garvey Jr. (17 August 1887 – 10 June 1940) was a Jamaican political activist. He was the founder and first President-General of the Universal Negro Improvement Association and African Communities League (UNIA-ACL, commonly known as UNIA), through which he declared himself Provisional President of Africa.

Ideologically a black nationalist and Pan-Africanist, Garvey's ideas are known as Garveyism. Garvey was born to a moderately prosperous Afro-Jamaican family in Saint Ann's Bay and was apprenticed into the print trade as a teenager. Working in Kingston, he became involved in trade unionism before living briefly in Costa Rica, Panama, and England. On returning to Jamaica, he founded UNIA in 1914. In 1916, he relocated to the United States and founded a UNIA branch in New York City's Harlem. Emphasising unity within the African diaspora, he campaigned to end European colonial rule in Africa and supported the continent's unification. He envisioned a unified Africa as a one-party state, led by himself, that would pass laws to promote black racial purity. Although he never visited Africa, he remained committed to the Back-to-Africa movement, arguing that part of the diaspora should migrate there. Garveyist ideas gained increasing popularity, and UNIA's membership expanded. As a black separatist, he established links with white racists such as the Ku Klux Klan (KKK) who shared his racial separatist views. This created a divide between Garvey and prominent African-American civil rights activists like W. E. B. Du Bois, who promoted racial integration. Believing that black people should be financially independent from white-dominated societies, Garvey launched various businesses in the US, including the Negro Factories Corporation and Negro World newspaper. In 1919, he became president of the Black Star Line shipping and passenger company, designed to forge a link between North America and Africa and facilitate African-American migration to Liberia. In 1923 Garvey was convicted of mail fraud for selling the company's stock, and was imprisoned in the United States Penitentiary, Atlanta for nearly two years. Garvey blamed Jews, claiming that they were prejudiced against him because of his links to the KKK.

After his sentence was commuted by US president Calvin Coolidge, Garvey was deported to Jamaica in 1927. Settling in Kingston with his wife Amy Jacques, Garvey established the People's Political Party in 1929, briefly serving as a city councilor. With UNIA in increasing financial difficulty, he relocated to London in 1935, where his anti-socialist stance distanced him from many of the city's black activists. He died there in 1940. In 1964 his body was returned to Jamaica for reburial in National Heroes Park in Kingston. Garvey was a controversial figure. Some in the African diasporic community regarded him as a pretentious demagogue, and were highly critical of his collaboration with white supremacists, his violent rhetoric, and his prejudice against mixed-race people and Jews. He received praise for encouraging a sense of pride and self-worth among Africans and the African diaspora amid widespread poverty, discrimination and colonialism. In Jamaica, he was the first person formally recognised as a National Hero. His ideas exerted a considerable influence on such movements as Rastafari, the Nation of Islam and the Black Power Movement.

== Early life ==
=== Childhood: 1887–1904 ===
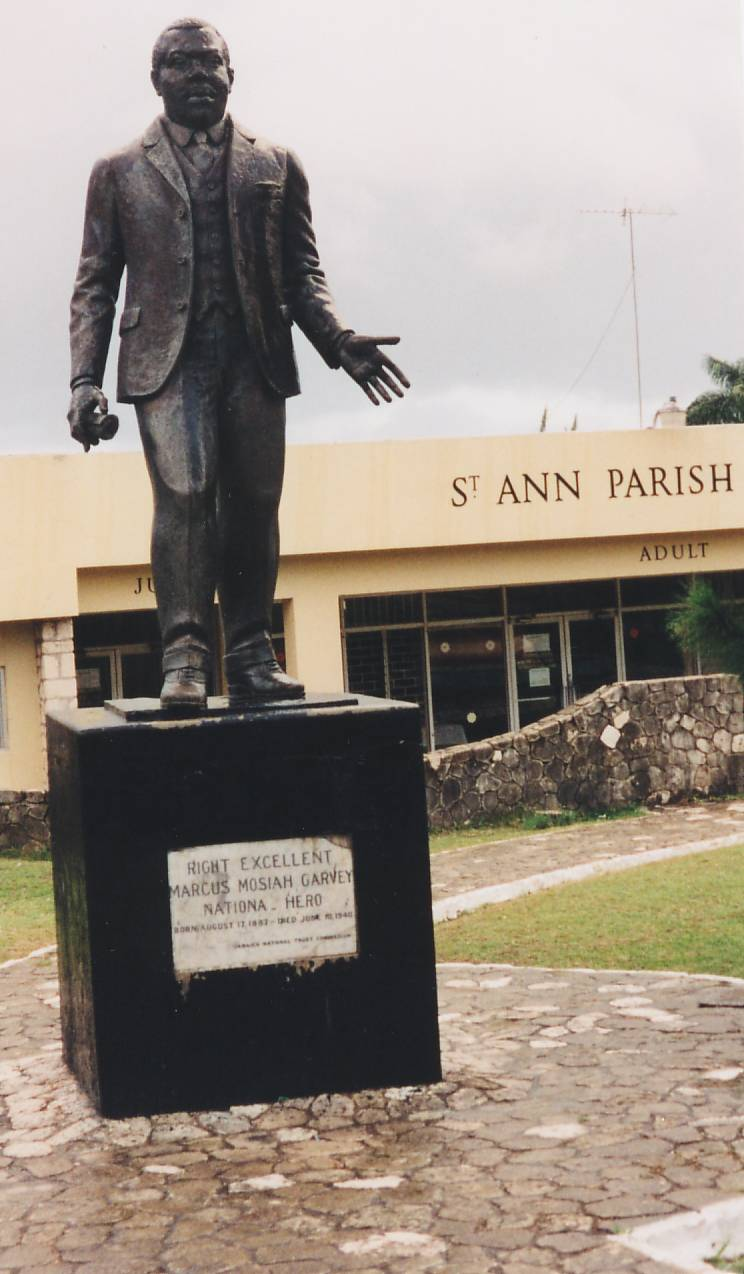
A statue of Garvey now stands in Saint Ann's Bay, the town where he was born

Marcus Mosiah Garvey was born on 17 August 1887 in Saint Ann's Bay, a town in the British colony of Jamaica. In the context of colonial Jamaican society, which had a colourist social hierarchy, Garvey was considered at the lowest end, being a black child who was of full African descent in appearance. However, later genetic research on his Y chromosome nevertheless revealed that he had distant ancestors from the Iberian Peninsula. Garvey's paternal great- grandfather had been born into slavery prior to its abolition in Jamaica. His surname, which was of Irish origin, had been inherited from his family's former enslavers.

His father, Malchus Garvey, was a stonemason; his mother, Sarah Richards, was a domestic servant and the daughter of peasant farmers. Malchus had had two previous wives before Sarah, having six children between them. Sarah and he had four additional children, of whom Marcus was the youngest, although two died in infancy. Because of his profession, Malchus' family were wealthier than many of their peasant neighbours; they were petite bourgeoise. Malchus was however reckless with his money and over the course of his life lost most of the land he owned to meet payments. Malchus had a book collection and was self-educated; he also served as a deacon at a local Wesleyan church. Malchus was an intolerant and punitive father and husband; he never had a close relationship with his son.

Up to the age of 14, Garvey attended a local church school; further education was unaffordable for the family. When not in school, Garvey worked on his maternal uncle's tenant farm. He had friends, with whom he once broke the windows of a church, resulting in his arrest. Some of his friends were white, although he found that as they grew older they distanced themselves from him; he later recalled that a close childhood friend was a white girl: "We were two innocent fools who never dreamed of a race feeling and problem." In 1901, Marcus was apprenticed to his godfather, a local printer. In 1904, the printer opened another branch at Port Maria, where Garvey began to work, travelling from Saint Ann's Bay each morning.

=== Early career in Kingston: 1905–1909 ===
In 1905 he moved to Kingston, where he boarded in Smith Village, a working-class neighborhood. In the city, he secured work with the printing division of the P.A. Benjamin Manufacturing Company. He rose quickly through the company ranks, becoming their first Afro-Jamaican foreman. His sister and mother, by this point estranged from his father, moved to join him in the city. In January 1907, Kingston was hit by a large earthquake that reduced much of the city to rubble. He, his mother, and his sister were left to sleep in the open for several months. In March 1908, his mother died. While in Kingston, Garvey converted to Roman Catholicism.

Garvey became a trade unionist, vice president of the compositors' section of the Printers' Union, and took a leading role in the November 1908 print workers' strike. The strike was broken several weeks later and Garvey was sacked. Henceforth branded a troublemaker, Garvey was unable to find work in the private sector. He then found temporary employment with a government printer. As a result of these experiences, Garvey became increasingly angry at the inequalities present in Jamaican society.

Garvey involved himself with the National Club, Jamaica's first nationalist organization, becoming its first assistant secretary in April 1910. The group campaigned to remove the Governor of Jamaica, Sydney Olivier, from office, and to end the migration of Indian "coolies", or indentured workers, to Jamaica, as they were seen as a source of economic competition by the established population. With fellow Club member Wilfred Domingo he published a pamphlet expressing the group's ideas, The Struggling Mass. In early 1910, Garvey began publishing a magazine, Garvey's Watchman—its name a reference to George William Gordon's The Watchman—although it lasted just three issues. He claimed it had a circulation of 3,000, although this was likely an exaggeration. Garvey also enrolled in elocution lessons with the radical journalist Joseph Robert Love, coming to regard him as a mentor. With Garvey's enhanced skill at speaking in a Standard English manner, he entered several public-speaking competitions.

=== Travels abroad: 1910–1914 ===
Economic hardship in Jamaica led to growing emigration from the island. In mid-1910, Garvey travelled to Costa Rica, where an uncle had secured him employment as a timekeeper on a large banana plantation in the Limón Province owned by the United Fruit Company (UFC). Shortly after his arrival, the area experienced strikes and unrest in opposition to the UFC's attempts to cut its workers' wages. Although as a timekeeper he was responsible for overseeing the manual workers, he became increasingly angered at how they were treated. In the spring of 1911 he launched a bilingual newspaper, Nation/La Nación, which criticized the actions of the UFC and upset many of the dominant strata of Costa Rican society in Limón. His coverage of a local fire, in which he questioned the motives of the fire brigade, resulted in his being brought in for police questioning. After his printing press broke, he was unable to replace the faulty part and terminated the newspaper.

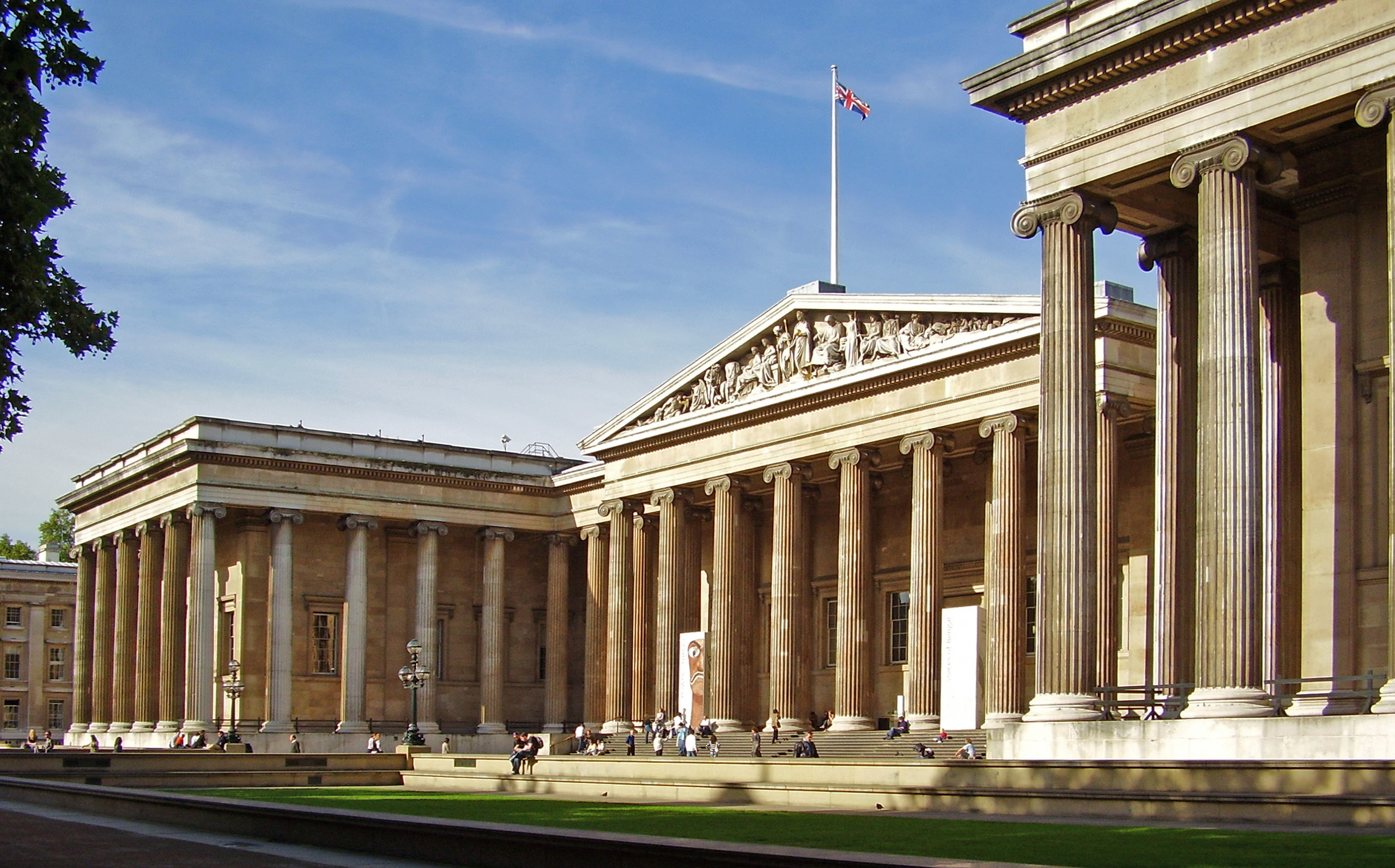
In London, Garvey spent time in the Reading Room of the British Museum

Garvey then travelled through Central America, undertaking casual work as he made his way through Honduras, Ecuador, Colombia, and Venezuela. While in the port of Colón in Panama, he set up a new newspaper, La Prensa ("The Press"). In 1911, he became seriously ill with a bacterial infection and decided to return to Kingston. He then decided to travel to London, the heart of the British Empire, in the hope of advancing his informal education. In the spring of 1912 he sailed to England. Renting a room along Borough High Street in South London, he visited the House of Commons, where he was impressed by the politician David Lloyd George. He also visited Speakers' Corner in Hyde Park and began making speeches there. There were only a few thousand black people in London at the time, and they were often viewed as exotic; most worked as labourers. Garvey initially gained piecemeal work labouring in the city's docks. In August 1912, his sister Indiana joined him in London, where she worked as a domestic servant.

In early 1913, he was employed as a messenger and handyman for the African Times and Orient Review, a magazine based in Fleet Street that was edited by Dusé Mohamed Ali. The magazine advocated Ethiopianism and home rule for British-ruled Egypt. In 1914, Mohamed Ali began employing Garvey as a writer for the magazine. Garvey also took several evening classes in law at Birkbeck College in Bloomsbury. He planned a tour of Europe, spending time in Glasgow, Paris, Monte Carlo, Boulogne, and Madrid.

Back in London, he wrote an article on Jamaica for the Tourist magazine, and spent time reading in the library of the British Museum. There he discovered Up from Slavery, a book by the African-American entrepreneur and activist Booker T. Washington. Washington's book heavily influenced Garvey. Now almost financially destitute and deciding to return to Jamaica, he unsuccessfully asked both the Colonial Office and the Anti-Slavery and Aborigines' Protection Society to pay for his journey. After managing to save the funds for a fare, he boarded the SS Trent in June 1914 for a three-week journey across the Atlantic. En route home, Garvey talked with an Afro-Caribbean missionary who had spent time in Basutoland and taken a Basuto wife. Discovering more about colonial Africa from this man, Garvey began to envision a movement that would politically unify black people of African descent across the world.

== Organization of the UNIA ==
=== Forming the UNIA: 1914–1916 ===
To the cultured mind the bulk of our [i.e. black] people are contemptible[…] Go into the country parts of Jamaica and you will see there villainy and vice of the worst kind, immorality, obeah and all kinds of dirty things[…] Kingston and its environs are so infested with the uncouth and vulgar of our people that we of the cultured class feel positively ashamed to move about. Well, this society [UNIA] has set itself the task to go among the people[…] and raise them to the standard of civilised approval.

— Garvey, from a 1915 Collegiate Hall speech published in the Daily Chronicle

Garvey arrived back in Jamaica in July 1914. There, he saw his article for Tourist republished in The Gleaner. He began earning money selling greeting and condolence cards that he had imported from Britain, before later switching to selling tombstones.

Also in July 1914, Garvey launched the Universal Negro Improvement Association and African Communities League, commonly abbreviated as UNIA. Adopting the motto of "One Aim. One God. One Destiny", it declared its commitment to "establish a brotherhood among the black race, to promote a spirit of race pride, to reclaim the fallen and to assist in civilising the backward tribes of Africa." Initially, it had only a few members. Many Jamaicans were critical of the group's prominent use of the term "Negro", a term that was often employed as an insult: Garvey, however, embraced the term with reference to black people of African descent.

Garvey became UNIA's president and travelling commissioner; it was initially based out of his hotel room in Orange Street, Kingston. It portrayed itself not as a political organization but as a charitable club, focused on work to help the poor and to ultimately establish a vocational training college modelled on Booker T. Washington's Tuskegee Institute in Alabama. Garvey wrote to Washington and received a brief, if encouraging reply; Washington died shortly after. UNIA officially expressed its loyalty to the British Empire, King George V, and the British effort in the ongoing First World War. In April 1915, British Brigadier-general Leonard Shadwell Blackden lectured to the group on the war effort; Garvey endorsed Blackden's calls for more Jamaicans to sign up to fight for the Empire on the Western Front. The group also sponsored musical and literary evenings as well as a February 1915 elocution contest, at which Garvey took first prize.

In August 1914, Garvey attended a meeting of the Queen Street Baptist Literary and Debating Society, where he met Amy Ashwood, recently graduated from the Westwood Training College for Women. She joined UNIA and rented better premises for them to use as their headquarters, secured using her father's credit. She and Garvey embarked on a relationship, which was opposed by her parents. In 1915, they secretly became engaged. When she suspended the engagement, he threatened to commit suicide, at which she resumed it.

I was openly hated and persecuted by some of these colored men of the island who did not want to be classified as Negroes but as white.

— Garvey, on how he was received in Jamaica

Garvey attracted financial contributions from many prominent patrons, including the Mayor of Kingston and the Governor of Jamaica, William Manning. By appealing directly to Jamaica's white elite, Garvey had skipped the brown middle-classes, comprising those who were classified as mulattos, quadroons, and octoroons. They were generally hostile to Garvey, regarding him as a pretentious social climber and being annoyed at his claim to be part of the "cultured class" of Jamaican society. Many also felt that he was unnecessarily derogatory when describing black Jamaicans, with letters of complaint being sent into the Daily Chronicle after it published one of Garvey's speeches in which he referred to many of his people as "uncouth and vulgar". One complainant, a Dr Leo Pink, related that "the Jamaican Negro can not be reformed by abuse". After unsubstantiated allegations began circling that Garvey was diverting UNIA funds to pay for his own personal expenses, the group's support began to decline. He became increasingly aware of how UNIA had failed to thrive in Jamaica and decided to migrate to the United States, sailing there aboard the SS Tallac in March 1916.

=== Moving to the United States: 1916–1918 ===
The UNIA flag, a tricolour of red, black, and green. According to Garvey, the red symbolises the blood of martyrs, the black symbolizes the skin of Africans, and the green represents the vegetation of the African land.

Arriving in the United States, Garvey initially lodged with a Jamaican expatriate family living in Harlem, a largely black area of New York City. He began lecturing in the city, hoping to make a career as a public speaker, although at his first public speech he was heckled and fell off the stage. From New York City, he embarked on a US speaking tour, crossing 38 states. At stopovers on his journey he listened to preachers from the African Methodist Episcopal Church and the Black Baptist churches. While in Alabama, he visited the Tuskegee Institute and met with its new leader, Robert Russa Moton. After six months traveling across the US lecturing, he returned to New York City.

In May 1917, Garvey launched a New York branch of UNIA. He declared membership open to anyone "of Negro blood and African ancestry" who could pay the 25-cents-a-month membership fee. He joined many other speakers who made speeches on the street, standing on step-ladders; he often did so at Speakers' Corner on 135th Street. In his speeches, he sought to reach across to both Afro-Caribbean migrants like himself and native African Americans. Through this, he began to associate with Hubert Harrison, who was promoting ideas of black self-reliance and racial separatism. In June, Garvey shared a stage with Harrison at the inaugural meeting of the latter's Liberty League of Negro-Americans. Through his appearance here and at other events organized by Harrison, Garvey attracted growing public attention.

After the US entered the First World War in April 1917, Garvey initially signed up to fight but was ruled physically unfit to do so. He later became an opponent of African-American involvement in the conflict, following Harrison in accusing it of being a "white man's war". In the wake of the East St. Louis Race Riots in May to July 1917, in which white mobs targeted black people, Garvey began calling for armed self-defense. He produced a pamphlet, The Conspiracy of the East St Louis Riots, which was widely distributed; proceeds from its sale went to victims of the riots. The Bureau of Investigation began monitoring him, noting that in speeches he employed more militant language than that used in print; it for instance reported his expressing the view that "for every Negro lynched by whites in the South, Negroes should lynch a white in the North."

By the end of 1917, Garvey had attracted many of Harrison's key associates in his Liberty League to join UNIA. Garvey also secured the support of the journalist John Edward Bruce, agreeing to step down from the group's presidency in favor of Bruce. Bruce then wrote to Dusé Mohamed Ali to learn more about Garvey's past. Mohamed Ali responded with a negative assessment of Garvey, suggesting that he simply used UNIA as a money-making scheme. Bruce read this letter to a UNIA meeting and put pressure on Garvey's position. Garvey then resigned from UNIA, establishing a rival group that met at Old Fellows Temple. He also launched legal proceedings against Bruce and other senior UNIA members, with the court ruling that UNIA's name and membership—now estimated at 600—belonged to Garvey, who resumed control over the organization.

=== The growth of UNIA: 1918–1921 ===
UNIA membership grew rapidly in 1918. In June that year it was incorporated, and in July a commercial arm, the African Communities' League, filed for incorporation. Garvey envisioned UNIA establishing an import-and-export business, a restaurant, and a laundry. He also proposed raising the funds to secure a permanent building as a base for the group. In April, Garvey launched a weekly newspaper, the Negro World, which Edmund David Cronon later noted remained "the personal propaganda organ of its founder". Financially, the Negro World was backed by philanthropists such as Madam C. J. Walker, but six months after its launch was pursuing a special appeal for donations to keep it afloat.

Various journalists took Garvey to court for his failure to pay them for their contributions, a fact much publicized by rival publications; at the time, there were more than 400 black-run newspapers and magazines in the U.S. Unlike many of these, Garvey refused to feature adverts for skin-lightening and hair-straightening products, urging black people to "take the kinks out of your mind, instead of out of your hair". By the end of its first year, the circulation of Negro World was nearing 10,000; copies circulated not only in the U.S., but also in the Caribbean, Central, and South America. Several British West Indian islands banned the publication.

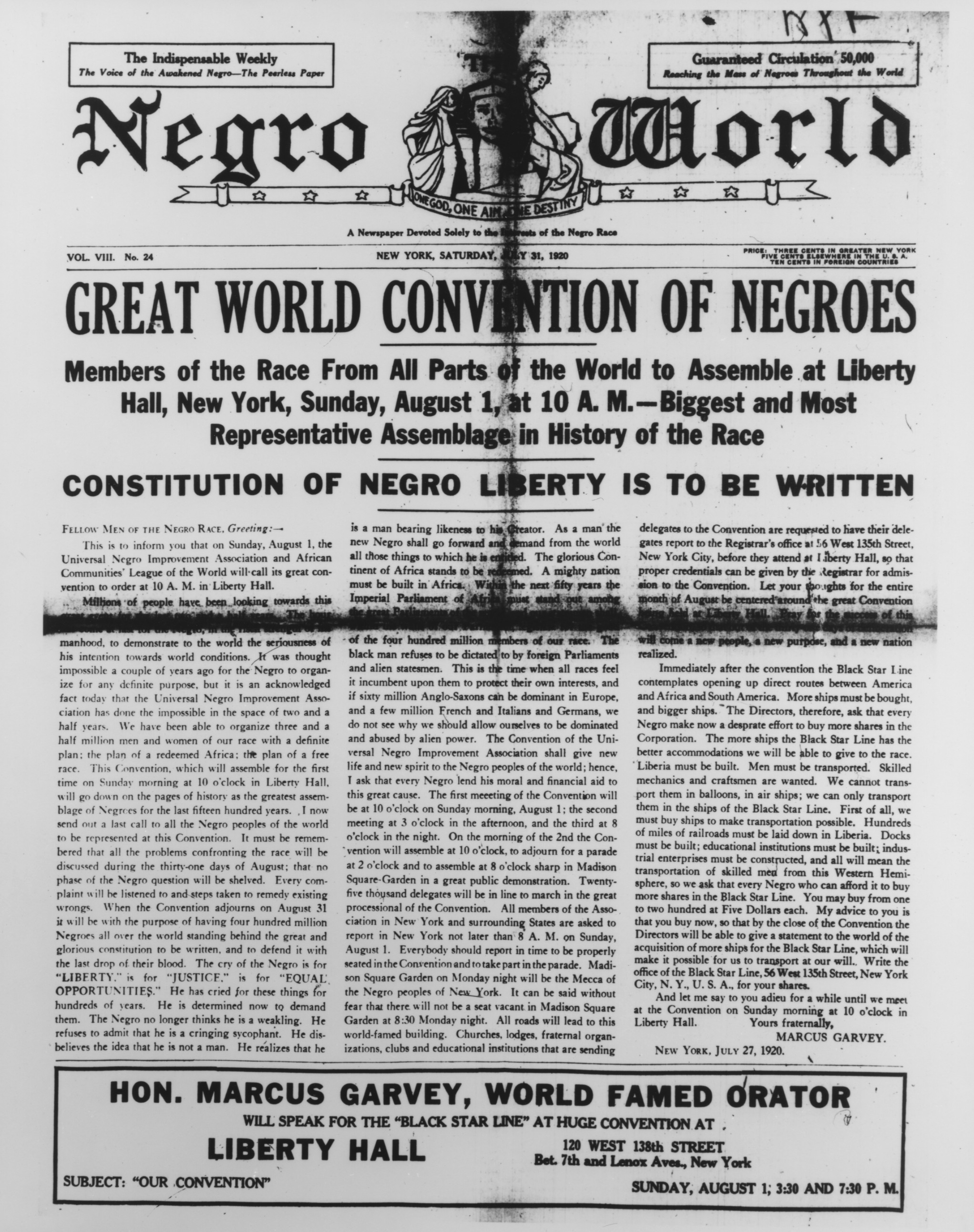
In 1918, Garvey's UNIA began publishing the Negro World newspaper.

Garvey appointed his old friend Domingo, who had also arrived in New York City, as the newspaper's editor. However, Domingo's socialist views alarmed Garvey, who feared that they would imperil UNIA. Garvey had Domingo brought before UNIA's nine-person executive committee, where the latter was accused of writing editorials professing ideas at odds with UNIA's message. Domingo resigned several months later; he and Garvey henceforth became enemies. In September 1918, Amy Ashwood sailed from Panama to be with Garvey, arriving in New York City in October. In November, she became General Secretary of UNIA. At UNIA gatherings, she was responsible for reciting black-authored poetry, as was the actress Henrietta Vinton Davis, who had also joined the movement.

After the First World War ended, President Woodrow Wilson declared his intention to present a 14-point plan for world peace at the forthcoming Paris Peace Conference. Garvey joined various African Americans in forming the International League for Darker People, a group that sought to lobby Wilson and the conference to give greater respect to the wishes of people of color; their delegates nevertheless were unable to secure the travel documentation. At Garvey's prompting, UNIA sent a young Haitian, Eliezer Cadet, as its delegate to the conference. Despite these efforts, the political leaders who met in Paris largely ignored the perspectives of non-European peoples, instead reaffirming their support for continued European colonial rule.

In the US, many African Americans who had served in the military refused to return to their more subservient role in society and throughout 1919 there were various racial clashes throughout the country. The government feared that African Americans would be encouraged toward revolutionary behavior following the October Revolution in Russia, and in this context, military intelligence ordered Major Walter Loving to investigate Garvey. Loving's report concluded that Garvey was a "very able young man" who was disseminating "clever propaganda". The Bureau of Investigation's J. Edgar Hoover decided that Garvey was politically subversive and should be deported from the US, adding his name to the list of those to be targeted in the forthcoming Palmer Raids. To ratify the deportation, the Bureau of Investigation presented Garvey's name to the Labor Department under Louis F. Post; however, Post's department refused to do so, stating that the case against Garvey was not proven.

==== Success and obstacles ====
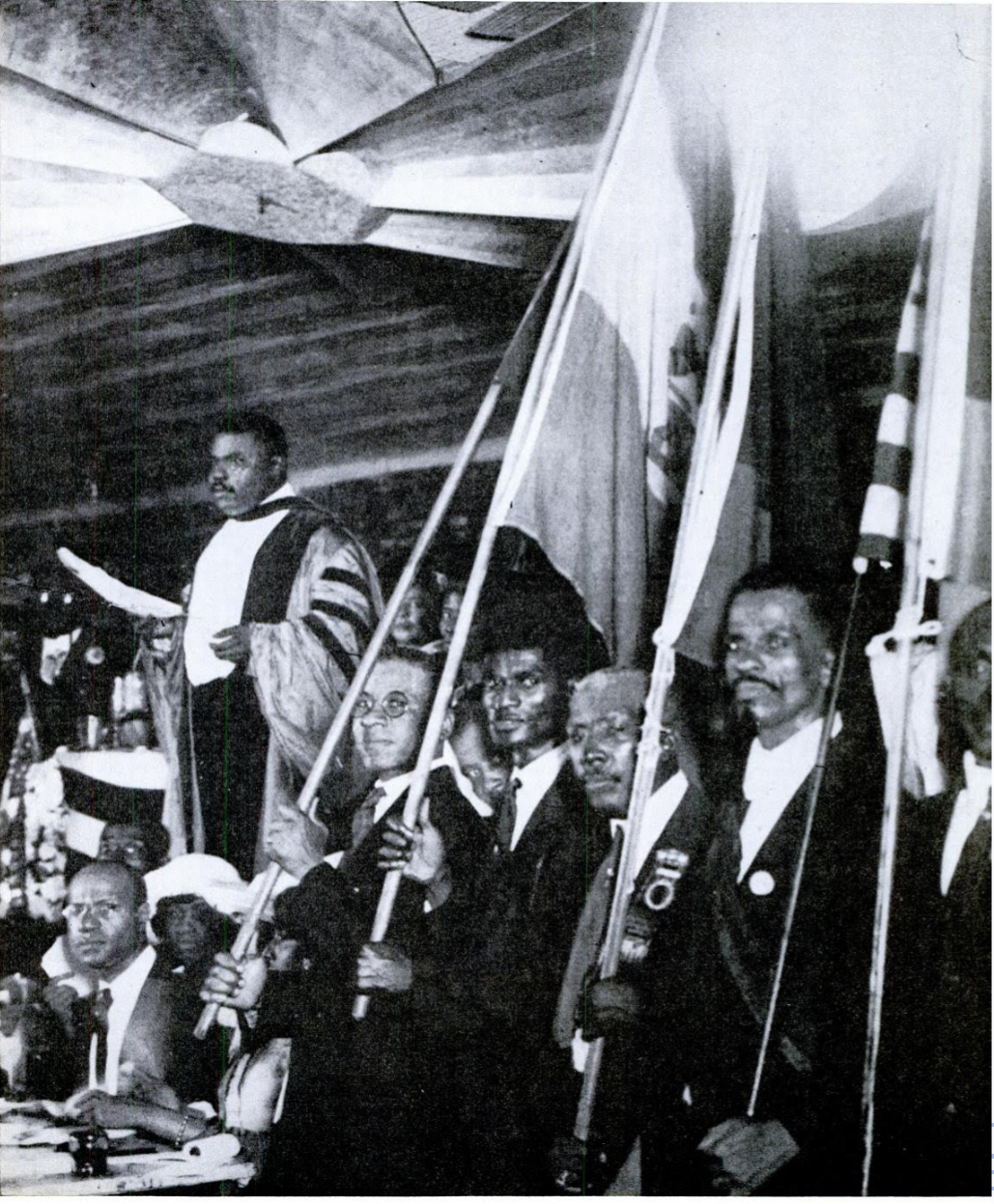
Garvey speaking at Liberty Hall, Harlem, in 1920

UNIA grew rapidly and in just over 18 months it had branches in 25 US states, as well as divisions in the West Indies, Central America, and West Africa. The exact membership is not known, although Garvey—who often exaggerated numbers—claimed that by June 1919 it had two million members. It remained smaller than the better established National Association for the Advancement of Colored People (NAACP), although there was some crossover in membership of the two groups. The NAACP and UNIA differed in their approach; while the NAACP was a multi-racial organization which promoted racial integration, UNIA had a black-only membership policy. The NAACP focused its attention on what it termed the "talented tenth" of the African-American population, such as doctors, lawyers, and teachers, whereas UNIA included many poorer people and Afro-Caribbean migrants in its ranks, seeking to project an image of itself as a mass organization. To promote his views to a wide audience, Garvey took to shouting slogans from a megaphone as he was driven through Harlem in a Cadillac.

There were tensions between UNIA and the NAACP and the latter's supporters accused Garvey of stymieing their efforts at bringing about racial integration in the U.S. Garvey was dismissive of the NAACP leader W. E. B. Du Bois, and in one issue of the Negro World called him a "reactionary under [the] pay of white men". Du Bois generally tried to ignore Garvey, regarding him as a demagogue, but at the same time wanted to learn all he could about Garvey's movement. In 1921, Garvey twice reached out to Du Bois, asking him to contribute to UNIA publications, but the offer was rebuffed. Their relationship became acrimonious; in 1923, Du Bois described Garvey as "a little fat black man, ugly but with intelligent eyes and big head". By 1924, historian Colin Grant has suggested, the two hated each other.

UNIA established a restaurant and ice cream parlor at 56 West 135th Street, and also launched a millinery store selling hats. With an increased income coming in through UNIA, Garvey moved to a new residence at 238 West 131st Street; in 1919, a young middle-class Jamaican migrant, Amy Jacques, became his personal secretary. UNIA also obtained a partly-constructed church building at 114 West 138 Street in Harlem, which Garvey named "Liberty Hall" after its namesake in Dublin, Ireland, which had been established during the Easter Rising of 1916. The adoption of this name reflected Garvey's fascination with the Irish independence movement. Liberty Hall's dedication ceremony was held in July 1919. During the hunger strike of Terence MacSwiney, Garvey supported solidarity strikes in support of MacSwiney and made appeals to the British government on his behalf.

Garvey also organized the African Legion, a group of uniformed men who would attend UNIA parades; a secret service was formed from Legion members, providing Garvey with intelligence about group members. The formation of the Legion further concerned the Bureau of Investigation, who sent their first full-time black agent, James Wormley Jones, to infiltrate UNIA. In January 1920, Garvey incorporated the Negro Factories League, through which he opened a string of grocery stores, a restaurant, a steam laundry, and publishing house. According to Grant, a personality cult had grown up around Garvey within the UNIA movement; life-size portraits of him hung in the UNIA headquarters and phonograph records of his speeches were sold to the membership.

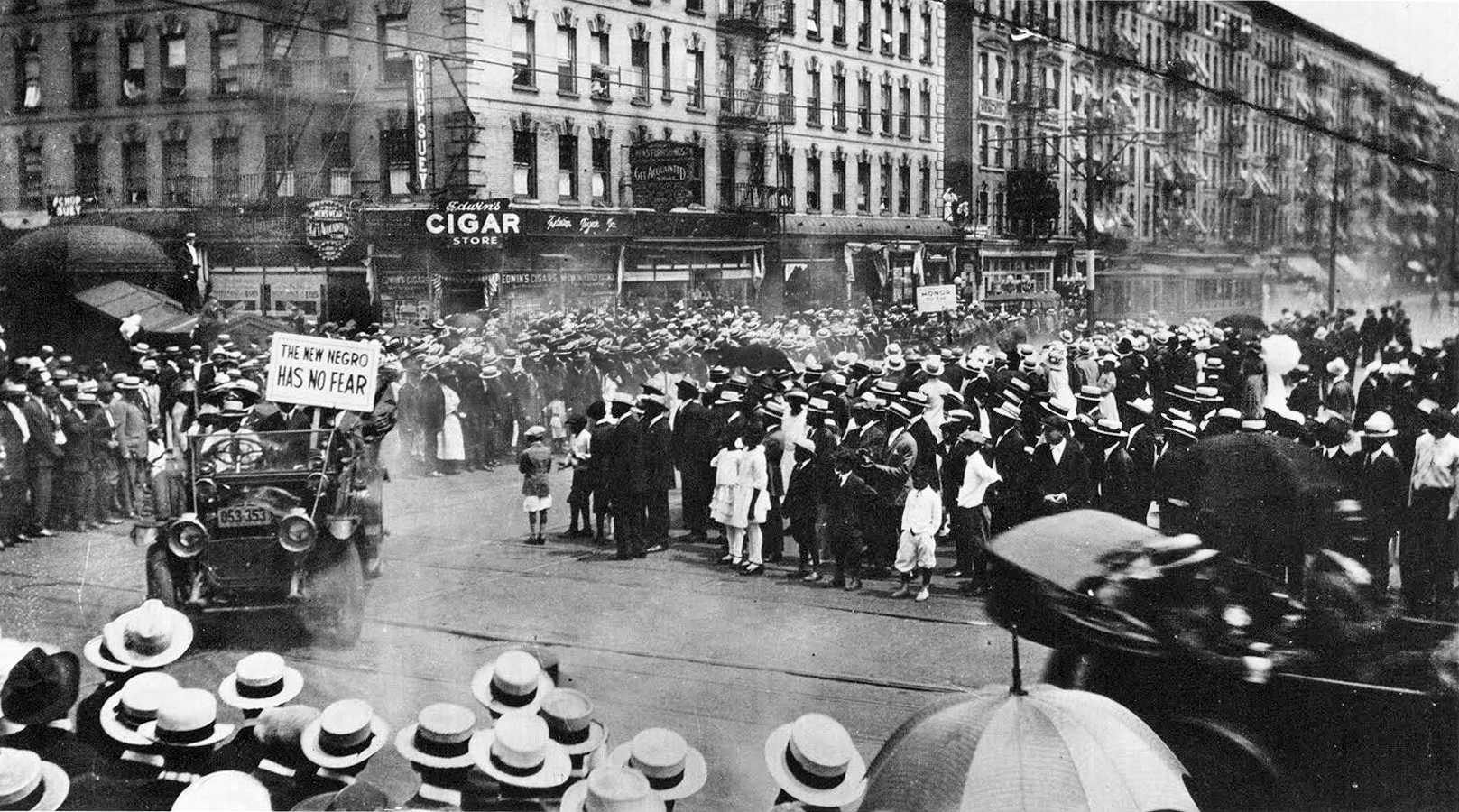
A UNIA parade through Harlem in 1920

In August 1920, UNIA organized the First International Conference of the Negro Peoples in Harlem. This parade was attended by Gabriel Johnson, the Mayor of Monrovia in Liberia. As part of it, an estimated 25,000 people assembled in Madison Square Garden. At the conference, UNIA delegates declared Garvey to be the Provisional President of Africa, charged with heading a government-in-exile that could take power in the continent when European colonial rule ended via decolonization. Some of the West Africans attending the event were angered by this, believing it wrong that an Afro-Jamaican, rather than a native African, was taking this role.

Many outside the movement ridiculed Garvey for giving himself this title. The conference then elected other members of the African government-in-exile, resulting in the production of a "Declaration of the Rights of the Negro Peoples of the World" which condemned European colonial rule across Africa. In August 1921, UNIA held a banquet in Liberty Hall, at which Garvey gave out honors to various supporters, including such titles as the Order of the Nile and the Order of Ethiopia.

UNIA established growing links with the Liberian government, hoping to secure land in the West African nation on which it could settle African-American migrants. Liberia was in heavy debt, with UNIA launching a fundraising campaign to raise $2,000,000 (equivalent to $36,000,000 in 2025) towards a Liberian Construction Loan. In 1921, Garvey sent a UNIA team to assess the prospects of mass African-American settlement in Liberia. Internally, UNIA experienced various feuds. Garvey pushed out Cyril Briggs and other members of the African Blood Brotherhood from UNIA, wanting to place growing distance between himself and black socialist groups. In the Negro World, Garvey then accused Briggs—who was of mixed heritage—of being a white man posing as a black man. Briggs successfully sued Garvey for criminal libel. This was not the only time he faced this charge; in July 1919, Garvey had been arrested for comments in the Negro World about Edwin P. Kilroe, the Assistant District Attorney in the District Attorney's office of the County of New York. When this case eventually came to court, the court ordered Garvey to provide a printed retraction.

==== Assassination attempt, marriage, and divorce ====
In October 1919, George Tyler, a part-time vendor of the Negro World, entered the UNIA office and told Garvey that Kilroe "had sent him" and tried to assassinate Garvey. Garvey was shot at four times with a .38-calibre revolver, and received two bullets in his right leg and scalp but survived. Tyler was soon apprehended but committed suicide by leaping from the third-tier of the Harlem jail; it was never revealed why he tried to kill Garvey. Garvey soon recovered from his wounds; five days later he gave a public speech in Philadelphia. After the assassination attempt, Garvey hired a bodyguard, Marcellus Strong.

Shortly after the incident, Garvey proposed marriage to Amy Ashwood and she accepted. On Christmas Day 1919, they had a private Catholic wedding, followed by a major ceremonial celebration in Liberty Hall, attended by 3,000 UNIA members. Jacques was Ashwood's maid of honor. After the wedding, Garvey moved into Ashwood's apartment. The newlyweds embarked on a two-week honeymoon in Canada, accompanied by a small UNIA retinue, including Jacques. There, Garvey spoke at two mass meetings in Montreal and three in Toronto. After their return to Harlem, the couple's marriage was soon strained. Ashwood complained of Garvey's growing closeness with Jacques. Garvey was upset by his inability to control his wife, particularly her drinking and her socializing with other men. She was pregnant, although the child was possibly not his; she did not inform him of this, and the pregnancy ended in miscarriage.

Three months into the marriage, Garvey sought an annulment, on the basis of Ashwood's alleged adultery and the claim that she had used "fraud and concealment" to induce the marriage. She launched a counter-claim for desertion, requesting a $75 (equivalent to $1,205 in 2025) per week alimony. The court rejected this sum, instead ordering Garvey to pay her $12 (equivalent to $193 in 2025) a week. It refused to grant him the divorce. The court proceedings continued for two years. Now separated, Garvey moved into a 129th Street apartment with Jacques and Henrietta Vinton Davis, an arrangement that at the time could have caused some social controversy. He was later joined there by his sister Indiana and her husband, Alfred Peart. Ashwood, meanwhile, went on to become a lyricist and musical director for musicals amid the Harlem Renaissance.

==== The Black Star Line ====
Black Star Line was organized for the industrial, commercial and economic development of the race to carry out the program of U.N.I.A., that is to have ships to link up the Negro peoples of the world in commercial trade and in fraternities.

— The Negro World

From 56 West 135th Street, UNIA also began selling shares for a new business, the Black Star Line. Seeking to challenge white domination of the maritime industry, the Black Star Line based its name on the White Star Line. Garvey envisioned a shipping and passenger line traveling between Africa and the Americas, which would be black-owned, black-staffed, and utilized by black patrons. He thought that the project could be launched by raising $2 million from African-American donors, publicly declaring that any black person who did not buy stock in the company "will be worse than a traitor to the cause of struggling Ethiopia".

Garvey incorporated the company and then set about trying to purchase a ship. Many African Americans took great pride in buying company stock, seeing it as an investment in their community's future; Garvey also promised that when the company began turning a profit they would receive significant financial returns on their investment. To advertise this stock, he traveled to Virginia, and then in September 1919 to Chicago, where he was accompanied by seven other UNIA members. In Chicago, he was arrested and fined for violating the Blue Sky Laws that banned the sale of stock in the city without a license.

With growing quantities of money coming in, a three-man auditing committee was established, which found that UNIA's funds were poorly recorded and that the company's books were not balanced. This was followed by a breakdown in trust between the directors of the Black Star Line, with Garvey discharging two of them, Richard E. Warner and Edgar M. Grey, and publicly humiliating them at the next UNIA meeting. People continued buying stock regardless and by September 1919, the Black Star Line company had accumulated $50,000 ($930,000 in current dollar terms) by selling stock. It could thus afford a thirty-year-old tramp ship, the SS Yarmouth. The ship was formally launched in a ceremony on the Hudson River on 31 October. The company had been unable to find enough trained black seamen to staff the ship, so its initial chief engineer and chief officer were white.

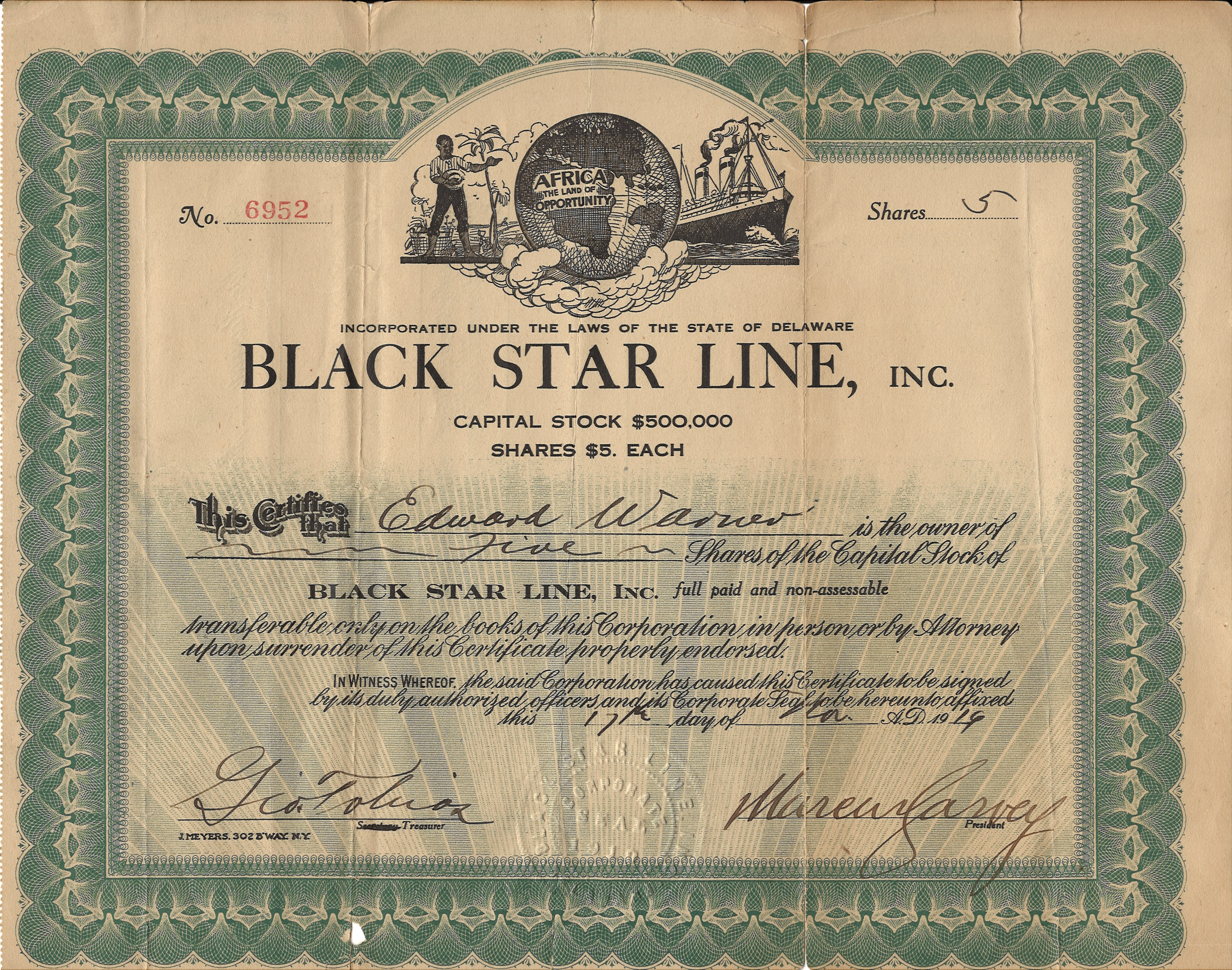
A certificate for stock of the Black Star Line

The ship's first assignment was to sail to Cuba and then to Jamaica, before returning to New York. After that first voyage, the Yarmouth was found to contain many problems and the Black Star Line had to pay $11,000 for repairs. On its second voyage, again to the Caribbean, it hit bad weather shortly after departure and had to be towed back to New York by the coastguard for further repairs. Garvey planned to obtain and launch a second ship by February 1920, with the Black Star Line putting down a $10,000 ($160,000 in current dollar terms) deposit on a paddle ship called the SS Shady Side. In July 1920, Garvey sacked both the Black Star Line's secretary, Edward D. Smith-Green, and its captain, Joshua Cockburn; the latter was accused of corruption. In early 1922, the Yarmouth was sold for scrap metal, bringing the Black Star Line less than a hundredth of its original purchase price. The worn-out steamboat Shady Side was abandoned on the mud flats at Fort Lee, New Jersey, in the fall of 1922, when the Black Star Line collapsed.

In 1921, Garvey traveled to the Caribbean aboard a Black Star Line ship, the newly-acquired Antonio Maceo. While in Jamaica, he criticized its inhabitants as being backward and claimed that "Negroes are the most lazy, the most careless and indifferent people in the world". His comments in Jamaica earned many enemies, who criticized him on multiple fronts, including the fact he had left his destitute father to die in an almshouse. Attacks back-and-forth between Garvey and his critics appeared in the letters published by The Gleaner.

From Jamaica, Garvey traveled to Costa Rica, where the United Fruit Company assisted his transportation around the country, hoping to gain his favor. There, he met with President Julio Acosta. Arriving in Panama, at one of his first speeches, in Almirante, he was booed after doubling the advertised entry price; his response was to call the crowd "a bunch of ignorant and impertinent Negroes. No wonder you are where you are and for my part you can stay where you are." He received a far warmer reception at Panama City, after which he sailed to Kingston. From there he sought a return to the US, but was repeatedly denied an entry visa. This was granted only after he wrote directly to the State Department.

=== Criminal charges: 1922–1923 ===
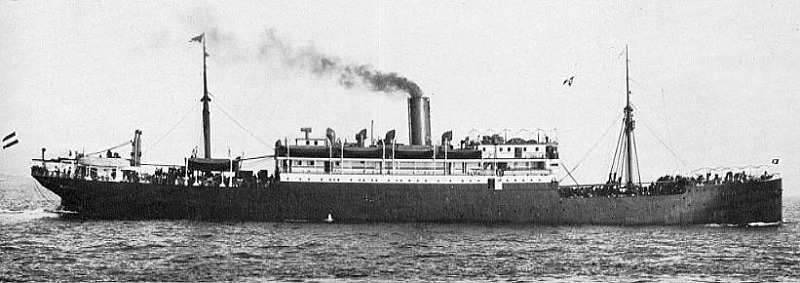
The steamship Orion

In January 1922, Garvey was arrested and charged with mail fraud for having advertised the sale of stocks in a ship, Orion, which the Black Star Line did not yet own. He was bailed out for $2,500 (equivalent to $48,100 in 2025). Hoover and the BOI were committed to securing a conviction; they had also received complaints from a small number of the Black Star Line's stock owners, who wanted them to pursue the matter further. Garvey spoke out against the charges he faced, but focused on blaming not the state, but rival African-American groups, for them. As well as accusing disgruntled former members of UNIA, in a Liberty Hall speech, he implied that the NAACP were behind the conspiracy to imprison him. The mainstream press picked up on the charge, largely presenting Garvey as a con artist who had swindled African-American people.

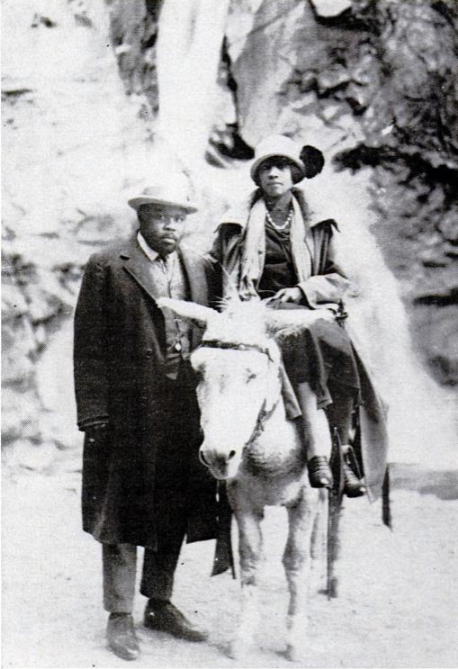
Garvey with his wife Amy Jacques in 1922

After his arrest, Garvey announced that the activities of the Black Star Line were being suspended. He also made plans for a tour of the western and southern states. This included a parade in Los Angeles, partly to woo back members of UNIA's California branch, which had recently splintered off to become independent. In June 1922, Garvey met with Edward Young Clarke, the Imperial Wizard pro tempore of the Ku Klux Klan (KKK) at the Klan's offices in Atlanta. Garvey made a number of incendiary speeches in the months leading up to that meeting; in some, he thanked the whites for Jim Crow. Garvey once stated:

I regard the Klan, the Anglo-Saxon clubs and White American societies, as far as the Negro is concerned, as better friends of the race than all other groups of hypocritical whites put together. I like honesty and fair play. You may call me a Klansman if you will, but, potentially, every white man is a Klansman as far as the Negro in competition with whites socially, economically and politically is concerned, and there is no use lying.

News of Garvey's meeting with the KKK soon spread and it was covered on the front page of many African-American newspapers, causing widespread upset. When news of the meeting was revealed, it generated much surprise and anger among African Americans; Grant noted that it marked "the most significant turning point in his popularity". Several prominent black Americans—Chandler Owen, A. Philip Randolph, William Pickens, and Robert Bagnall—launched the "Garvey Must Go" campaign in the wake of the revelation. Many of these critics played to nativist ideas by emphasising Garvey's Jamaican identity and sometimes calling for his deportation. Pickens and several other of Garvey's critics claimed to have been threatened, and sometimes physically attacked, by Garveyites. Randolph reported receiving a severed hand in the post, accompanied by a letter from the KKK threatening him to stop criticising Garvey and to join UNIA.

Have this day interviewed Edward Young Clarke, acting Imperial Wizard Knights of the Ku Klux Klan. In conference of two ours he outlined the aims and objects of the Klan. He denied any hostility towards the Negro Improvement Association. He believes America to be a white man's country, and also states that the Negro should have a country of his own in Africa[…] He has been invited to speak at [UNIA's] forthcoming convention to further assure the race of the stand of the Klan.

— Garvey's telegram to UNIA HQ, June 1922.

1922 also brought some successes for Garvey. He attracted the country's first black pilot, Hubert Fauntleroy Julian, to join UNIA and to perform aerial stunts to raise its profile. The group also launched its Booker T. Washington University from the UNIA-run Phyllis Wheatley Hotel at 3–13 West 136th Street. He also finally succeeded in securing a UNIA delegation to the League of Nations, sending five members to represent the group to Geneva.

Garvey also proposed marriage to his secretary, Jacques. She accepted, although later stated: "I did not marry for love. I did not love Garvey. I married him because I thought it was the right thing to do." They married in Baltimore in July 1922. She proposed that a book of his speeches be published; it appeared as The Philosophy and Opinions of Marcus Garvey, although the speeches were edited to remove more inflammatory material. That year, UNIA also launched a new newspaper, the Daily Negro Times.

At UNIA's August 1922 convention, Garvey called for the impeachment of several senior UNIA figures, including Adrian Johnson and J. D. Gibson, and declared that the UNIA cabinet should not be elected by the organization's members, but appointed directly by him. When they refused to step down, he resigned both as head of UNIA and as Provisional President of Africa, probably in an act designed to compel their own resignations. He then began openly criticising another senior member, Reverend James Eason, and succeeded in getting him expelled from UNIA.

With Eason gone, Garvey asked the rest of the cabinet to resign; they did so, at which he resumed his role as head of the organization. In September, Eason launched a rival group to UNIA, the Universal Negro Alliance. In January 1923, Eason was assassinated by Garveyites while in New Orleans. Hoover suspected that the killing had been ordered by senior UNIA members, although Garvey publicly denied any involvement; he nevertheless launched a defense fund campaign for Eason's killers.

Following the murder, eight prominent African Americans signed a public letter calling Garvey "an unscrupulous demagogue who has ceaselessly and assiduously sought to spread among Negroes distrust and hatred of all white people". They urged the Attorney-General to bring forth the criminal case against Garvey and disband UNIA. Garvey was furious, publicly accusing them of "the greatest bit of treachery and wickedness that any group of Negroes could be capable of." In a pamphlet attacking them he focused on their racial heritage, lambasting the eight for the reason that "nearly all [are] Octoroons and Quadroons". Du Bois—who was not among the eight—then wrote an article critical of Garvey's activities in the US Garvey responded by calling Du Bois "a Hater of Dark People", an "unfortunate mulatto who bewails every drop of Negro blood in his veins".

=== Trial: 1923 ===
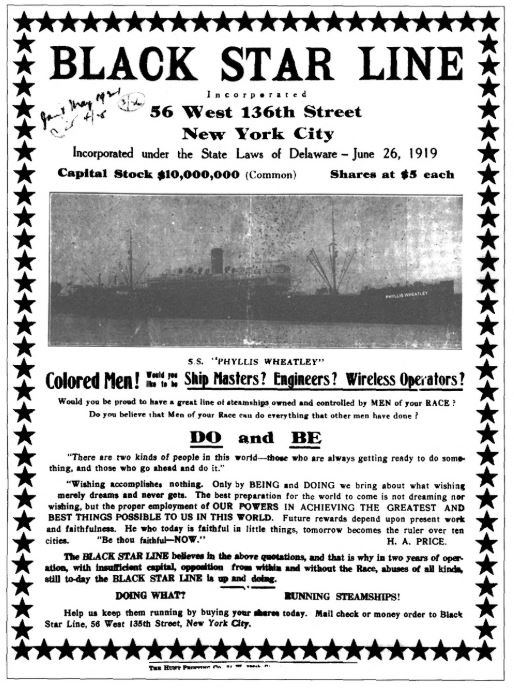
The Black Star Line brochure for Phyllis Wheatley, central exhibit in the Mail Fraud case of 1921. Phyllis Wheatley did not exist; this is a doctored photograph of an ex-German ship, Orion, put up for sale by the United States Shipping Board. The Black Star Line had proposed to buy her but the transaction was never completed.

Having been postponed at least three times, in May 1923, the trial finally came to court, with Garvey and three other defendants accused of mail fraud. The judge overseeing the proceedings was Julian Mack, although Garvey disliked his selection on the grounds that he thought Mack an NAACP sympathiser. At the start of the trial, Garvey's attorney, Cornelius McDougald, urged him to plead guilty to secure a minimum sentence, but Garvey refused, dismissing McDougald and deciding to represent himself in court. The trial proceeded for more than a month. Throughout, Garvey struggled due to his lack of legal training. In his three-hour closing address he presented himself as a selfless leader who was beset by incompetent and thieving staff who caused all the problems for UNIA and the Black Star Line. On 18 June, the jurors retired to deliberate on the verdict, returning after ten hours. They found Garvey himself guilty of a scheme to defraud, but his three co-defendants not guilty.

Garvey was furious with the verdict, shouting abuse in the courtroom and calling both the judge and district attorney "damned dirty Jews". Imprisoned in The Tombs jail, while awaiting sentence, he continued to blame a Jewish cabal for the verdict. Before this he had never expressed antisemitic sentiment and was supportive of Zionism. When it came to sentencing, Mack sentenced Garvey to five years in prison and a $1,000 fine (equivalent to $19,000 in 2025). The severity of the sentence—which was harsher than those given to similar crimes at the time—may have been a response to Garvey's antisemitic outburst. In 1928, Garvey told a journalist: "When they wanted to get me they had a Jewish judge try me, and a Jewish prosecutor. I would have been freed but two Jews on the jury held out against me ten hours and succeeded in convicting me, whereupon the Jewish judge gave me the maximum penalty." A decade later, however, in a New Jamaican editorial on 28 March 1933, he wrote: "The Jewish race is a noble one, and the Jew is only persecuted because he has certain qualities of progress that other people have not learnt", likened antisemitism to anti-Black persecution, and denounced Nazi racial intolerance.

A week after the sentence, 2,000 Garveyite protesters met at Liberty Hall to denounce Garvey's conviction as a miscarriage of justice. However, with Garvey imprisoned, UNIA's membership began to decline, and there was a growing schism between its Caribbean and African-American members. From jail, Garvey continued to write letters and articles lashing out at those he blamed for the conviction, focusing much of his criticism on the NAACP.

==== Out on bail: 1923–1925 ====
In September 1923, appellate judge Martin Manton awarded Garvey bail for $15,000 (equivalent to $283,000 in 2025) − which UNIA was able to raise and post — while he appealed against his conviction. At least temporarily a free man, Garvey toured the U.S., giving a lecture at the Tuskegee Institute. In speeches given during this tour he further emphasised the need for racial segregation through migration to Africa, calling the United States "a white man's country". He continued to defend his meeting with the KKK, describing them as having more "honesty of purpose towards the Negro" than the NAACP. Although he previously avoided involvement with party politics, for the first time he encouraged UNIA to propose candidates in elections, often setting them against NAACP-backed candidates in areas with high black populations.

The American Negro has endured this wretch [Garvey] too long with fine restraint and every effort of cooperation and understanding. But the end has come. Every man who apologizes for or defends Marcus Garvey from this day forth writes himself down as unworthy of the countenance of decent Americans. As for Garvey himself, this open ally of the Ku Klux Klan should be locked up or sent home.

— Du Bois, in The Crisis, May 1924.

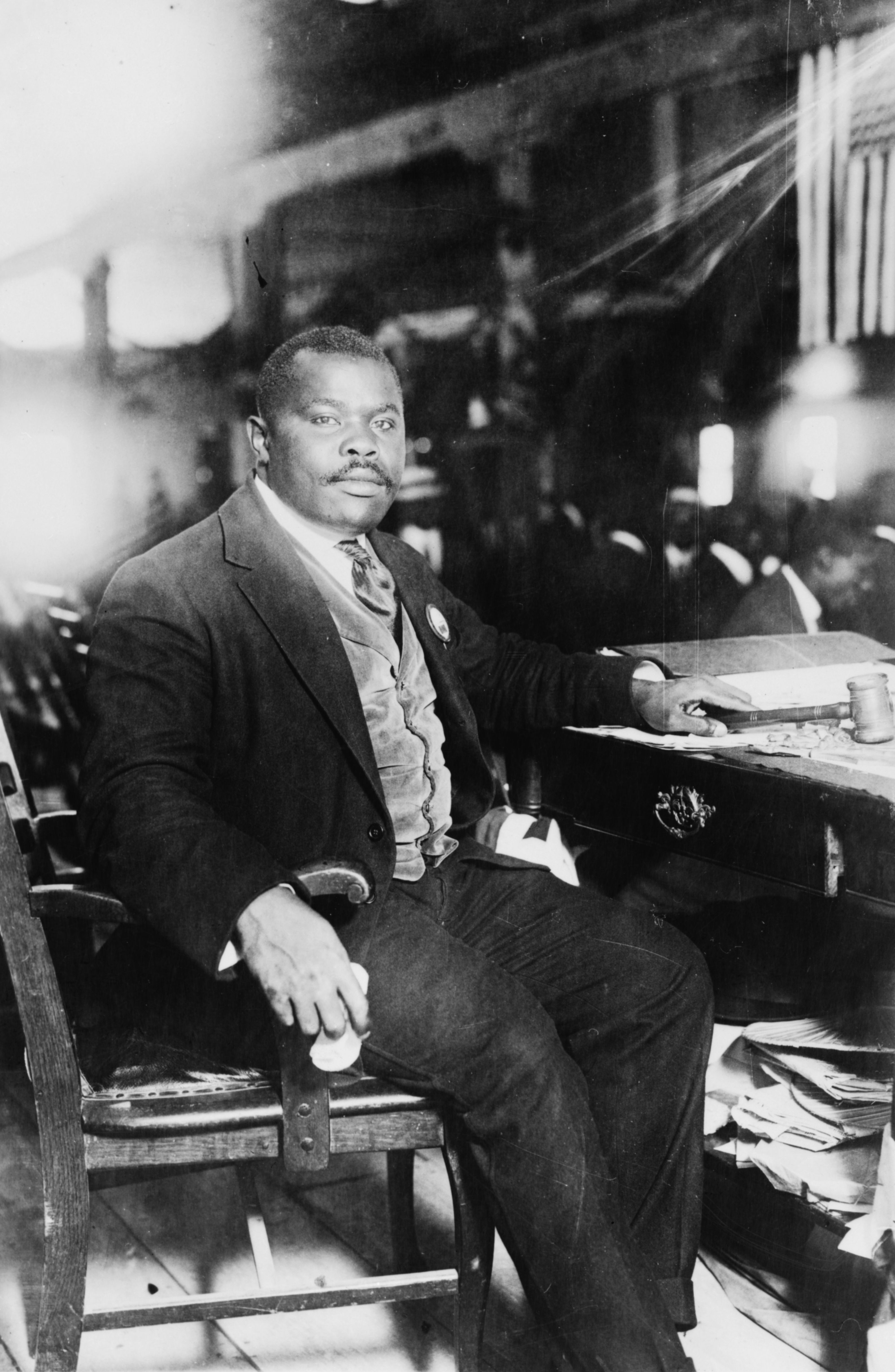
Garvey in 1924

In February 1924, UNIA put forward its plans to bring 3,000 African-American migrants to Liberia. The latter's president, Charles D. B. King, assured them that he would grant them land for three colonies. In June, a team of UNIA technicians was sent to start work in preparing for these colonies. When they arrived in Liberia, they were arrested and immediately deported. At the same time, Liberia's government issued a press release declaring that it would refuse permission for any Americans to settle in their country.

Garvey blamed W.E.B. Du Bois of the NAACP for this apparent change in the Liberian government's attitude, for the latter had spent time in the country and had links with its ruling elite; Du Bois denied the accusation. Later examination suggested that, despite King's assurances to the UNIA team, the Liberian government had never seriously intended to allow African-American colonization, aware that it would harm relations with the British and French colonies on their borders, who feared the political tensions it could bring with it.

UNIA faced further setbacks when John Edward Bruce died; the group organized a funeral procession ending in a ceremony at Liberty Hall. In need of additional finances, Negro World dropped its longstanding ban on advertising skin lightening and hair straightening products. The additional revenues allowed the Black Star Line to purchase a new ship, the SS General G W Goethals, in October 1924. It was then renamed the SS Booker T. Washington.

=== Imprisonment: 1925–1927 ===
In early February 1925, the United States Court of Appeals for the Second Circuit upheld the original court decision. Writing for the unanimous court, judge Charles Merrill Hough opined: "It may be true that Garvey fancied himself a Moses, if not a Messiah; that he deemed himself a man with a message to deliver, and believed that he needed ships for the deliverance of his people; but with this assumed, it remains true that if his gospel consisted in part of exhortations to buy worthless stock, accompanied by deceivingly false statements as to the worth thereof, he was guilty of a scheme or artifice to defraud, if the jury found the necessary intent about his stock scheme, no matter how uplifting, philanthropic, or altruistic his larger outlook may have been. And if such scheme to defraud was accompanied by the use of the mails defined by the statute, he was guilty of an offense under Criminal Code, § 215."

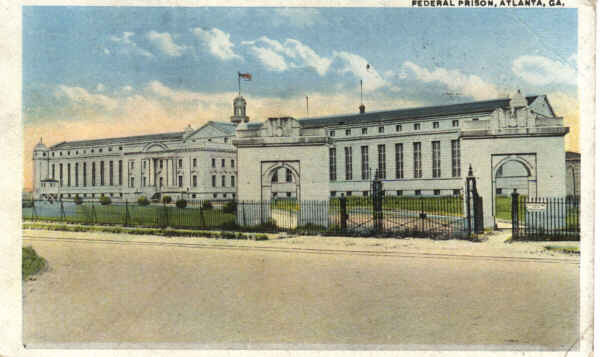
A postcard depicting the Atlanta Federal Penitentiary in 1920, a few years before Garvey was imprisoned there

Denial of his appeal meant the termination of the bail that had been granted following conviction. Garvey was in Detroit at the time and was arrested while aboard a train back to New York City. He was taken to the Atlanta Federal Penitentiary and incarcerated there. Imprisoned, he was made to carry out cleaning tasks. On one occasion he was reprimanded for insolence towards the white prison officers. There, he became increasingly ill with chronic bronchitis and lung infections. Two years into his imprisonment he was hospitalized with influenza.

Garvey received regular letters from UNIA members and from his wife; she also visited him every three weeks. With his support, she assembled another book of his collected speeches, Philosophy and Opinions; these had often been edited to remove inflammatory comments about wielding violence against white people. He also wrote The Meditations of Marcus Garvey, its name an allusion to The Meditations of Marcus Aurelius. From prison, Garvey continued corresponding with far-right white separatist activists like Earnest Sevier Cox of the White American Society and John Powell of the Anglo-Saxon Clubs of America; the latter visited Garvey in prison.

While Garvey was imprisoned, Ashwood launched a legal challenge against his divorce from her. Had the divorce been found void, then his marriage to Jacques would have been invalid. The court ruled in favor of Garvey, recognising the legality of his divorce. With Garvey absent, William Sherrill became acting head of UNIA. To deal with the organization's financial problems, he re-mortgaged Liberty Hall to pay off debts and ended up selling off the SS Booker T Washington at a quarter of what UNIA had paid for it.

Garvey was angry and in February 1926 wrote to the Negro World expressing his dissatisfaction with Sherrill's leadership. From prison, he organized an emergency UNIA convention in Detroit, where delegates voted to depose Sherrill. The latter's supporters then held a rival convention in Liberty Hall, reflecting the growing schism in the organization. A subsequent court ruling determined that it was UNIA's New York branch, then controlled by Sherrill, rather than the central UNIA leadership itself, that owned Liberty Hall. The financial problems continued, resulting in Liberty Hall being repeatedly re-mortgaged and then sold.

The Attorney General, John Sargent, received a petition with 70,000 signatures urging for Garvey's release. Sargeant warned President Calvin Coolidge that African Americans were regarding Garvey's imprisonment not as a form of justice against a man who had swindled them but as "an act of oppression of the race in their efforts in the direction of race progress". Eventually, Coolidge agreed to commute the sentence so that it would expire immediately, on 18 November 1927, after Garvey had served about half of the five-year term of imprisonment. The commutation stipulated, however, that Garvey should be deported immediately. On being released, Garvey was taken by train to New Orleans, where around a thousand supporters saw him onto the SS Saramaca on 3 December. The ship then stopped at Cristóbal in Panama, where supporters again greeted him, but where the authorities refused his request to disembark. He then transferred to the SS Santa Maria, which took him to Kingston, Jamaica.

== Later years ==
=== Return to Jamaica: 1927–1935 ===
In Kingston, Garvey was greeted by supporters. UNIA members had raised $10,000 ($190,000 in current dollar terms)to help him settle in Jamaica, with which he bought a large house in an elite neighbourhood, which he called the "Somali Court". His wife shipped over his belongings—which included 18,000 books and hundreds of antiques—before joining him. In Jamaica, he continued giving speeches, including at a building in Kingston he had also named "Liberty Hall". He urged Afro-Jamaicans to raise their standards of living and rally against Chinese and Syrian migrants who had moved to the island. Meanwhile, the US UNIA had been taken over by E. B. Knox; the latter was summoned to Jamaica for a meeting with Garvey after Laura Kofey, the leader of a group that had broken from UNIA, was killed, bringing the organization into further disrepute.

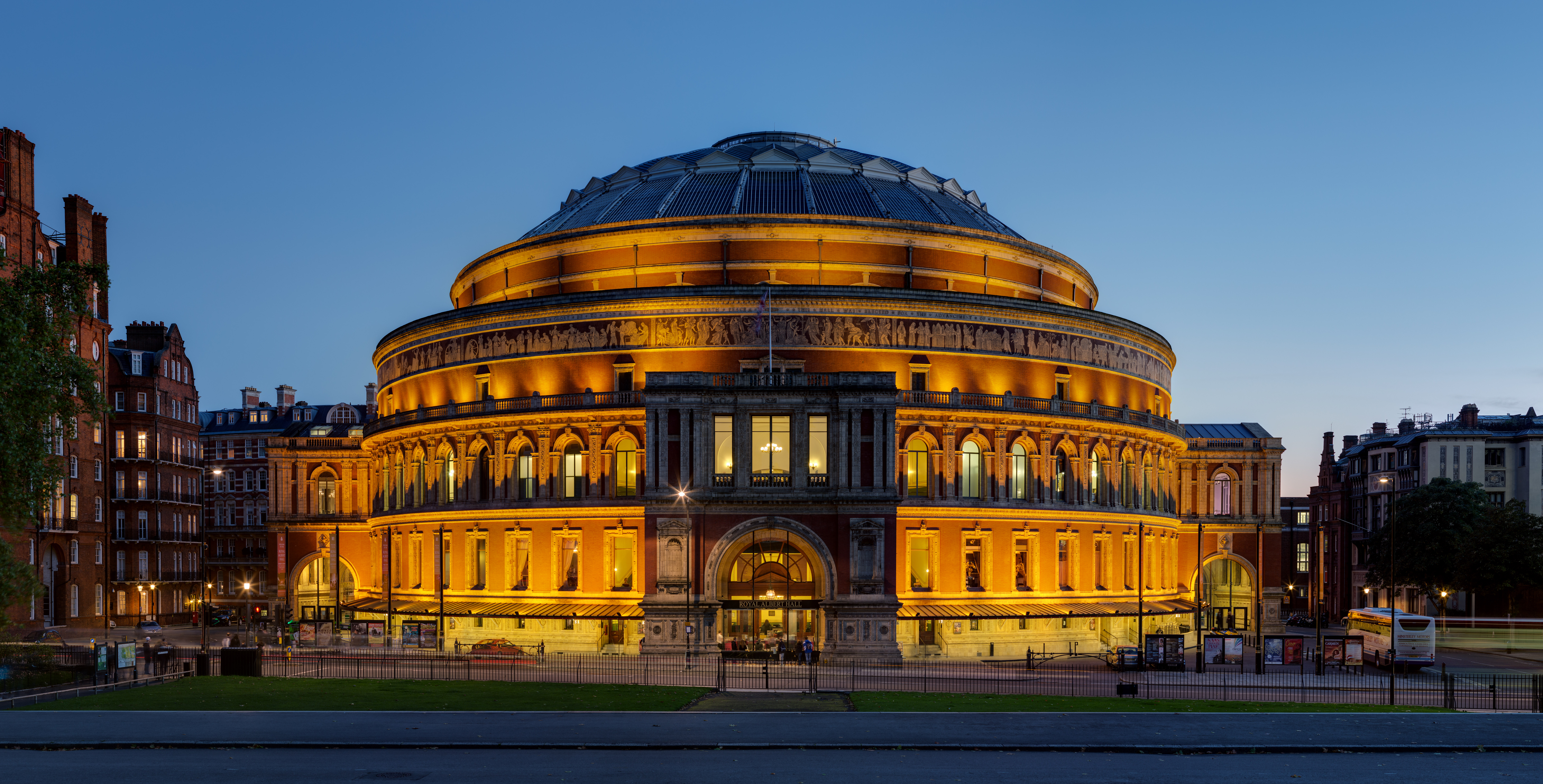
While in London, Garvey spoke at the Royal Albert Hall

Garvey attempted to travel across Central America but found his hopes blocked by the region's various administrations, who regarded him as disruptive. Instead, he travelled to England in April, where he rented a house in London's West Kensington area for four months. On 6 June 1928 he spoke at the Royal Albert Hall. Later that year, he and his wife visited Paris, where he had his office at the black newspaper La Dépêche Africaine headquarters and spoke at the Club du Fauborg, before traveling to Switzerland. They then travelled to Canada, where Garvey was detained for one night before being barred from making speeches.

Back in Kingston, UNIA obtained Edelweiss Park in Cross Roads, which it established as its new headquarters. They held a conference there, opened by a parade through the city which attracted tens of thousands of onlookers. At Edelweiss Park, UNIA also began putting on plays. One of these, Coronation of an African King, was written by Garvey and performed in August 1930. Its plot revolved around the crowning of Prince Cudjoe of Sudan, although it anticipated the crowning of Haile Selassie of Ethiopia later that year. In Jamaica, Garvey became a de facto surrogate father to his niece, Ruth, whose father had recently died.

In Kingston, Garvey was elected a city councillor and established the country's first political party, the People's Political Party (PPP), through which he intended to contest the forthcoming legislative council election. In September 1929 he addressed a crowd of 1,500 supporters, launching the PPP's manifesto, which included land reform to benefit tenant farmers, the addition of a minimum wage to the constitution, pledges to build Jamaica's first university and opera house, and a proposed law to impeach and imprison corrupt judges. The latter policy led to Garvey's being charged with demeaning the judiciary and undermining public confidence in it. He pled guilty, and was sentenced to three months in a Spanish Town prison and a £100 fine.

While imprisoned, Garvey was removed from the Kingston council by other councillors. Garvey was furious and wrote an editorial against them, published in the Blackman journal. This resulted in his being charged with seditious libel, for which he was convicted and sentenced to six months in prison. His conviction was then overturned on appeal. He then campaigned as the PPP's candidate for the legislative assembly in Saint Andrew Parish, in which he secured 915 votes, being defeated by George Seymour-Jones.

In increasingly strained finances amid the Great Depression, Garvey began working as an auctioneer, and by 1935 was supplementing this with his wife's savings. He re-mortgaged his house and personal properties and in 1934 Edelweiss Park was foreclosed and auctioned off. Dissatisfied with life in Jamaica, Garvey decided to move to London, sailing aboard the SS Tilapa in March 1935. Once in London, he told his friend Amy Bailey that he had "left Jamaica a broken man, broken in spirit, broken in health and broken in pocket... and I will never, never, never go back."

=== Life in London: 1935–1940 ===
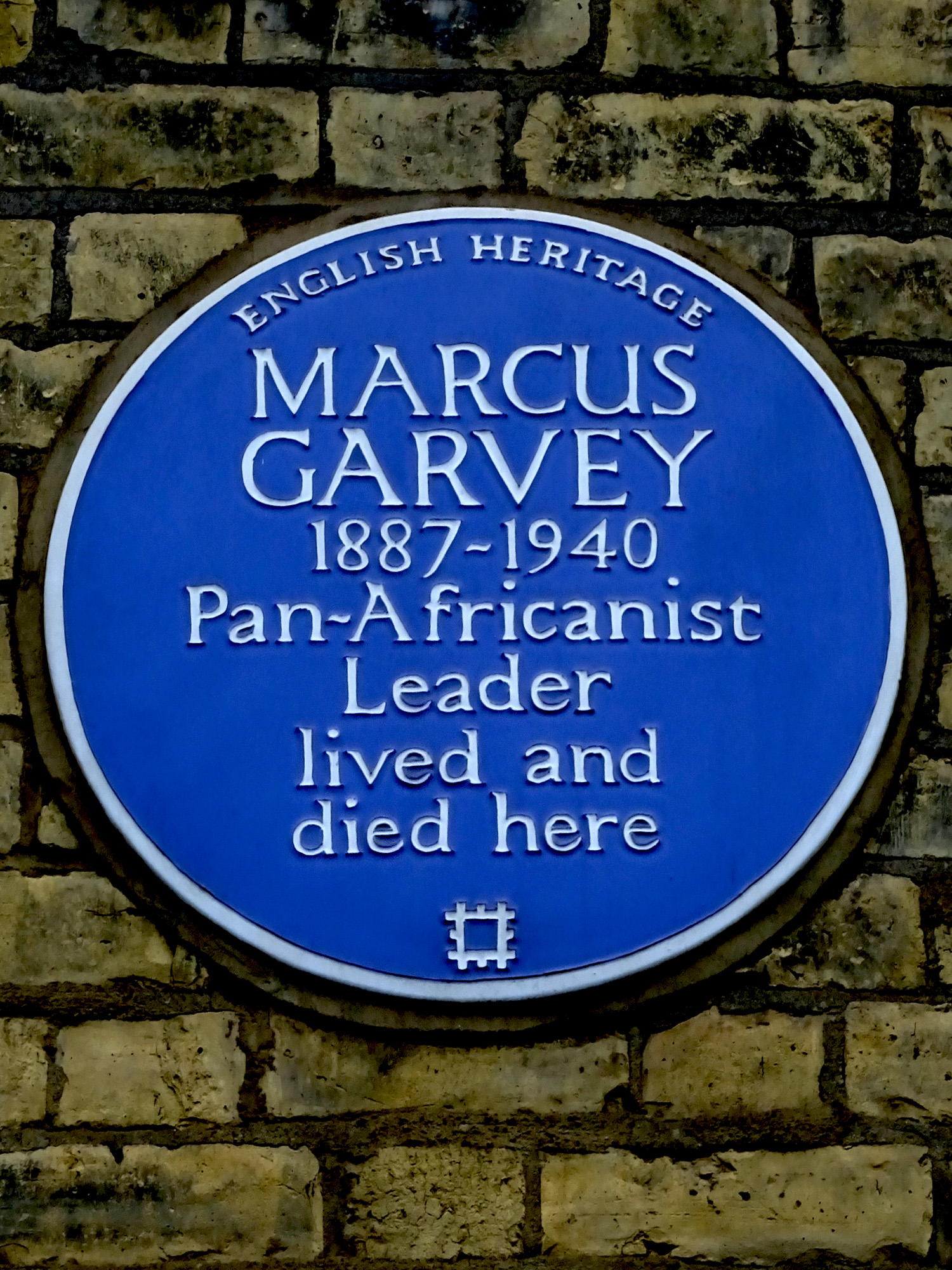
Blue plaque at 53 Talgarth Road, London, installed in 2005

In London, Garvey sought to rebuild UNIA, although found there was much competition in the city from other black activist groups. He established a new UNIA headquarters in Beaumont Avenue, West Kensington and launched a new monthly journal, Black Man. Garvey returned to speaking at Speakers' Corner in Hyde Park. When he spoke in public, he was increasingly harangued by socialists for his conservative stances. He also had hopes of becoming a Member of Parliament, although this amounted to nothing.

In 1935, the Second Italo-Ethiopian War broke out as Italy invaded Ethiopia. Garvey spoke out against the Italians and praised the government of Haile Selassie. By October, however, he was becoming increasingly critical of Selassie, blaming his lack of preparedness for Ethiopia's failures in the war. When Selassie fled his homeland and arrived in Britain, Garvey was among the black delegates who arranged to meet him at Waterloo station, but was rebuffed. From that point he became more openly hostile to Selassie, describing him as a "feudal monarch who looks down upon his slaves and serfs with contempt" and "a great coward who ran away from his country to save his skin". Garvey's vocal criticisms of Selassie further ostracised him from the broader black activist community—including many Garveyites—most of whom were rallying around Selassie as a symbol of Ethiopia's struggle against colonialism.

In June 1937, Garvey's wife and children arrived in England, where the latter were sent to a school in Kensington Gardens. Shortly after, Garvey embarked on a lecture and fundraising tour of Canada and the Caribbean, in which he attended the annual UNIA convention in Toronto. In Trinidad, he openly criticised a recent oil workers' strike; this probably exacerbated tensions between him and two prominent Trinidadian Marxists then living in London, C. L. R. James and George Padmore. Once he had returned to London, Garvey took up a new family home in Talgarth Road, not far from UNIA's headquarters. In public debates, Garvey repeatedly clashed with Padmore, who was chair of the International African Service Bureau. In the summer of 1938, Garvey returned to Toronto for the next UNIA conference.

While Garvey was gone, his wife and sons returned to Jamaica. Doctors had recommended his oldest son, Marcus III (also known as Marcus Jacques Garvey Jr.) be moved to a warm climate to aid with his severe rheumatism; Jacques had not informed her husband of the decision. When Garvey returned to London, he was furious with his wife's decision. Garvey was increasingly isolated, while UNIA was running out of funds as its international membership dwindled. For the first time in many years, he met up with Ashwood, who was also living in London.

=== Death and burial: 1940 ===
In January 1940, Garvey suffered a stroke which left him largely paralysed. His secretary, Daisy Whyte, took on responsibility for his care. At this point, George Padmore spread rumours of Garvey's death; this led to many newspapers publishing premature obituaries in late May 1940, many of which were critical of him, and many of which he read. According to his secretary, on the second day of reading through his pile of obituaries, Garvey suffered another massive stroke and died two weeks later at the age of 52 on 10 June 1940. His body was interred in a vault in the catacombs of the chapel of St Mary's Catholic Cemetery in Kensal Green, West London.

Various wakes and memorials were held for Garvey, especially in New York City and Kingston. In Harlem, a procession of mourners paraded to his memorial service. Some Garveyites refused to believe Garvey had died, even when confronted with photographs of his body in its coffin, insisting that this was part of a conspiracy to undermine his movement. Both Ashwood and Jacques presented themselves as the "widow of Marcus Garvey" and Ashwood launched legal action against Jacques in an attempt to secure control over his body.

The writer Richard Hart later noted that within a decade of his death "a veritable cult" had begun to grow around Garvey's memory in Jamaica. By the 1950s, Jamaican politicians of varied ideological backgrounds were invoking his name. Leslie Alexander, a Kingston real estate agent, proposed the removal of Garvey's body and its return to Jamaica. Alexander's campaign was successful and in 1964 Garvey's remains were exhumed and returned to Jamaica. The body lay in state at Holy Trinity Cathedral in Kingston and thousands of visitors came for a viewing.

His body was then reburied in King George VI Memorial Park on 22 November 1964 with pomp and ceremony befitting a national hero; numerous foreign diplomats attended. The monument, designed by G. C. Hodges, consists of a tomb at the center of a raised platform in the shape of a black star, a symbol often used by Garvey. Behind it, a peaked and angled wall houses a bust, by Alvin T. Marriot, of Garvey, which was added to the park in 1956 (before his reinterment) and relocated after the construction of the monument.

== Ideology ==
Ethiopia, thou land of our fathers,
Thou land where the gods loved to be,
As storm cloud at night suddenly gathers
Our armies come rushing to thee.
We must in the fight be victorious
When swords are thrust outward to gleam;
For us will the vict'ry be glorious
When led by the red, black, and green.

— Lyrics from the UNIA anthem

Ideologically, Garvey was a black nationalist. Generally referring to dark-skinned peoples of African descent as "Negroes", he and the UNIA insisted that that term should be capitalized, thus affording dignity and respect to those whom it described. His ideas were influenced by a range of sources. According to Grant, while he was living in London, Garvey displayed "an amazing capacity to absorb political tracts, theories of social engineering, African history and the Western Enlightenment." Garvey was exposed to the ideas about race that were prevalent at the time; his ideas on race were also heavily informed by the writings of Edward Wilmot Blyden and by his work in London with Dusé Mohamed Ali.

During the late 1910s and 1920s, Garvey was also influenced by the ideas of the Irish independence movement, to which he was sympathetic. He saw strong parallels between the subjugation of Ireland and the global subjugation of black people, and identified strongly with the Irish independence leader Éamon de Valera. In 1922, he sent a message to Valera stating that "We believe Ireland should be free even as Africa shall be free for the Negroes of the world. Keep up the fight for a free Ireland."

For Garvey, Ireland's Sinn Féin and the Irish independence movement served as blueprints for his own black nationalist cause. In July 1919, he stated that "the time has come for the Negro race to offer up its martyrs upon the altar of liberty even as the Irish [had] given a long list from Robert Emmet to Roger Casement." He also expressed admiration for the Indian independence movement, which was seeking an end to British rule in India, describing Mahatma Gandhi as "one of the noblest characters of the day".

=== Colourism ===
Garvey believed that darker-skinned Black people were often marginalized, and he sought to challenge systems that favoured lighter-skinned individuals in leadership and social status, sometimes known as colourism or complexionism. His philosophy was rooted in racial pride and self-reliance, encouraging Black people to celebrate their African features and reject Eurocentric beauty standards.

His views sometimes led to tensions with figures like W. E. B. Du Bois, who was of mixed heritage and whom Garvey accused of catering to lighter-skinned Black Americans.

=== Race and racial separatism ===
"Race first" was the adage which was widely used in Garveyism. In Garvey's view, "no race in the world is so just as to give others, for the asking, a square deal in things economic, political and social", but rather each racial group will favor its own interests, rejecting the "melting pot" notion of much 20th century American nationalism. He was hostile to the efforts of the progressive movement to agitate for social and political rights for African Americans, arguing that this was ineffective and that laws would never change the underlying racial prejudice of European Americans.

He argued that the European-American population of the U.S. would never tolerate the social integration which was being advocated by activists like Du Bois because he believed that campaigns for such integration would lead to anti-black riots and lynchings. He openly conceded that the U.S. was a white man's country and thus, he did not think that African Americans should expect equal treatment within it. Thus, he opposed attempts to socially and economically integrate the different races which lived within the country. Garveyism promoted the view that whites had no duty to help blacks achieve racial equality, maintaining the view that the latter needed to advance themselves on their own initiative. He advocated racial separatism, but he did not believe in black supremacy. He also rallied against Eurocentric beauty standards among blacks, seeing them as impediments to black self-respect.

[African Americans should] stop making[...] noise about social equality, giving the White people the idea that we are hankering after their company, and get down to business and build up a strong race, industrially, commercially, educationally and politically, everything social will come afterwards.

— Marcus Garvey, 1921

In the U.S., ideas about the need for black racial purity became central to Garvey's thought. He vehemently denounced miscegenation, believing that mixed-race individuals were "torn by dual allegiances" and they would often ally themselves "with the more powerful race", thus, they would become "traitors to the [black] race". Garvey argued that mixed-race people would be bred out of existence. Cronon believed that Garvey exhibited "antipathy and distrust of anybody but the darkest-skinned Negroes"; the hostility towards black people whose African blood was not considered "pure" was a sentiment which Garvey shared with Blyden.

This view caused great friction between Garvey and Du Bois, with the former accusing Du Bois and the NAACP of promoting "amalgamation or general miscegenation". He railed against what he called the "race destroying doctrine" of those African Americans who were promulgating racial integration in the U.S., instead, he maintained the view that his UNIA stood for "the pride and purity of race. We believe that the white race should uphold its racial pride and perpetuate itself, and we also believe that the black race should do likewise. We believe that there is room enough in the world for the various race groups to grow and develop by themselves without seeking to destroy the Creator's plan by the constant introduction of mongrel types." Arguing that Garvey "imitated white supremacist ideas at random", the scholar John L. Graves commented that "racism permeated nearly every iota of his ideology", with Garveyism representing "a gospel of hate for whites".

Garvey's belief in racial separatism, his advocacy of the migration of African Americans to Africa, and his opposition to miscegenation endeared him to the KKK, which supported many of the same policies. Garvey was willing to collaborate with the KKK in order to achieve his aims, and it was willing to work with him because his approach effectively acknowledged its belief that the U.S. should only be a country for white people and campaigns for advanced rights for African Americans who are living within the U.S. should be abandoned. Garvey called for collaboration between black and white separatists, stating that they shared common goals: "the purification of the races, their autonomous separation and the unbridled freedom of self-development and self-expression. Those who are against this are enemies of both races, and rebels against morality, nature and God." In his view, the KKK and other far-right white groups were "better friends" of black people "than all other groups of hypocritical whites put together" because they were honest about their desires and intentions.

=== Pan-Africanism ===
Garvey was a Pan-Africanist, and an African nationalist. In Jamaica, he and his supporters were heavily influenced by the pan-Africanist teachings of Dr Love and Alexander Bedward. In the wake of the First World War, Garvey called for the formation of "a United Africa for the Africans of the World". The UNIA promoted the view that Africa was the natural homeland of the African diaspora. While he was imprisoned, he penned an editorial for the Negro World titled "African Fundamentalism", in which he called for "the founding of a racial empire whose only natural, spiritual and political aims shall be God and Africa, at home and abroad."

Garvey supported the Back-to-Africa movement, which had been influenced by Edward Wilmot Blyden, who migrated to Liberia in 1850. However, Garvey did not believe that all African Americans should migrate to Africa. Instead, he believed that an elite group, namely those African Americans who were of the purest African blood, should do so. The rest of the African-American population, he believed, should remain in the United States, where it would become extinct within fifty years.

A proponent of the Back-to-Africa movement, Garvey called for a vanguard of educated and skilled African Americans to travel to West Africa, a journey which would be facilitated by his Black Star Line. Garvey stated that "The majority of us may remain here, but we must send our scientists, our mechanics and our artisans and let them build railroads, let them build the great educational and other institutions necessary", after which other members of the African diaspora could join them. He was aware that the majority of African Americans would not want to move to Africa until it had the more modern comforts that they had become accustomed to in the U.S. Through the UNIA, he discussed plans for a migration to Liberia, but these plans came to nothing and his hope to move African Americans to West Africa ultimately failed.

Wheresoever I go, whether it is England, France or Germany, I am told, "This is a white man's country." Wheresoever I travel throughout the United States of America, I am made to understand that I am a "nigger". If the Englishman claims England as his native habitat, and the Frenchman claims France, the time has come for 400 million Negroes to claim Africa as their native land... If you believe that the Negro should have a place in the sun; if you believe that Africa should be one vast empire, controlled by the Negro, then arise.

— Garvey, August 1920

In the 1920s, Garvey referred to his desire for a "big black republic" in Africa. Garvey envisioned Africa as a one-party state in which the president could have "absolute authority" to appoint "all of his lieutenants from cabinet ministers, governors of States and Territories, administrators and judges to minor offices". According to the scholar of African-American studies Wilson J. Moses, the future African state which Garvey envisioned was "authoritarian, elitist, collectivist, racist, and capitalistic", suggesting that it would have resembled the later Haitian government of François Duvalier. Garvey told the historian J. A. Rogers that he and his followers were "the first fascists", adding that "Mussolini copied Fascism from me, but the Negro reactionaries sabotaged it".

Garvey never visited Africa himself, and he did not speak any African language. He knew very little about the continent's varied customs, ethnicities, languages, religions, and traditional social structures, and his critics frequently believed that his views of the continent were based on romanticism and ignorance. It has been suggested that the European colonial authorities would not have given Garvey permission to visit colonies where he would be calling for decolonization.

For instance, the Jamaican writer and poet Claude McKay noted that Garvey "talks of Africa as if it were a little island in the Caribbean Sea". Garvey believed in negative stereotypes about Africa which portrayed it as a backward continent that was in need of the civilizing influence of Western, Christian states. Among his stated aims, he wanted "to assist in civilizing the backward tribes of Africa", and he also wanted "to promote a conscientious Christian worship among" them. His belief that Africans would ultimately be liberated by the efforts of the African diaspora which was living outside the continent has been considered condescending.

Moses stated that instead of being based on respect for indigenous African cultures, Garvey's views of an ideal united Africa were based on an "imperial model" of the kind which was promoted by western powers. When he extolled the glories of Africa, Garvey cited the ancient Egyptians and Ethiopians who had built empires and monumental architectural structures, which he cited as evidence of civilization, rather than the smaller-scale societies which lived on other parts of the continent. In doing so, he followed the lead of white academics of that era, who were similarly ignorant of most of African history and who focused nearly exclusively on ancient Egypt. Moses thought that Garvey "had more affinity for the pomp and tinsel of European imperialism than he did for black African tribal life". Similarly, the writer Richard Hart noted that Garvey was "much attracted by the glamour of the British nobility", an attraction which was reflected when he honored prominent supporters by giving them such British-derived titles as "Lords", "Ladies", and "Knights". Garvey's head was not turned, however, by the scholarly authority of Harvard University professor George Reisner whose opinion Garvey challenged on the pages of The Negro World.

=== Economic views ===
We must prepare now by organizing ourselves all over the world, by building businesses, stores and factories to sustain our people and free ourselves.

— Marcus Garvey

Garvey believed in economic independence for the African diaspora and through the UNIA, he attempted to achieve it by forming ventures like the Black Star Line and the Negro Factories Corporation. In Garvey's opinion, "without commerce and industry, a people perish economically. The Negro is perishing because he has no economic system". In his view, European-American employers would always favor European-American employees, so to gain more security, African Americans needed to form their own businesses. In his words, "the Negro[...] must become independent of white capital and white employers if he wants salvation." He believed that financial independence for the African-American community would ensure greater protection from discrimination, and provide the foundation for social justice.

Economically, Garvey supported capitalism, stating that "capitalism is necessary to the progress of the world, and those who unreasonably and wantonly oppose it or fight against it are enemies of human advancement." In the U.S., Garvey promoted a capitalistic ethos for the economic development of the African-American community, advocating black capitalism. His emphasis on capitalist ventures meant, according to Grant, that Garvey "was making a straight pitch to the petit-bourgeois capitalist instinct of the majority of black folk."

He admired Booker T. Washington's economic endeavours but criticized his focus on individualism: Garvey believed that African-American interests would best be advanced if businesses included collective decision-making and group profit-sharing. His advocacy of capitalistic wealth distribution was a more equitable view of capitalism than the view of capitalism which was then prevalent in the U.S.; he believed that some restrictions should be imposed on individuals and businesses in order to prevent them from acquiring too much wealth, in his view, no individual should be allowed to control more than one million dollars and no company should be allowed to control more than five million dollars. While he was living in Harlem, he envisioned the formation of a global network of black people who would trade among themselves, believing that his Black Star Line would contribute to the achievement of this aim.

There is no evidence to support the view that Garvey was ever sympathetic to socialism. While he was living in the U.S., he strongly opposed attempts to recruit African Americans into the trade union movement by socialist and communist groups, and he urged African Americans not to support the Communist Party. This led to heavy scrutiny from communist group leaders and figureheads such as Grace Campbell, among others. He believed that the communist movement did not serve the interests of African Americans because it was a white person's creation. He stated that communism was "a dangerous theory of economic or political reformation because it seeks to put government in the hands of an ignorant white mass who have not been able to destroy their natural prejudices towards Negroes and other non-white people. While it may be a good thing for them, it will be a bad thing for the Negroes who will fall under the government of the most ignorant, prejudiced class of the white race." In response, the Communist International characterised Garveyism as a reactionary bourgeois philosophy.

=== Black Christianity ===
Whilst our God has no color, yet it is human to see everything through one's own spectacles, and since the white people have seen their God through white spectacles, we have only now started out (late though it be) to see our God through our own spectacles.

— Garvey, on viewing God as black, 1923

Grant noted that "Garveyism would always remain a secular movement with a strong under-tow of religion". Garvey envisioned a form of Christianity which would specifically be designed for black African people, a sort of black religion. Reflecting his own view of religion, he wanted this black-centric Christianity to be as close to Catholicism as possible.

Even so, he attended the foundation ceremony of the African Orthodox Church in Chicago in 1921. According to Graves, this Church preached "the orthodox Christian tradition with emphasis on racism", and Cronon suggested that Garvey promoted "racist ideas about religion".

Garvey emphasised the idea of black people worshipping a God who was also depicted as black. In his words, "If the white man has the idea of a white God, let him worship his God as he desires. Since the white people have seen their God through white spectacles, we have only now started out to see our God through our own spectacles[...] we shall worship Him through the spectacles of Ethiopia." He called for black people to worship images of Jesus of Nazareth and the Virgin Mary that depicted these figures as black Africans. In doing so, he did not make use of pre-existing forms of black-dominated religions. Garvey had little experience with them, because he had attended a white-run Wesleyan congregation when he was a child, and later, he converted to Catholicism.

== Personality and personal life ==
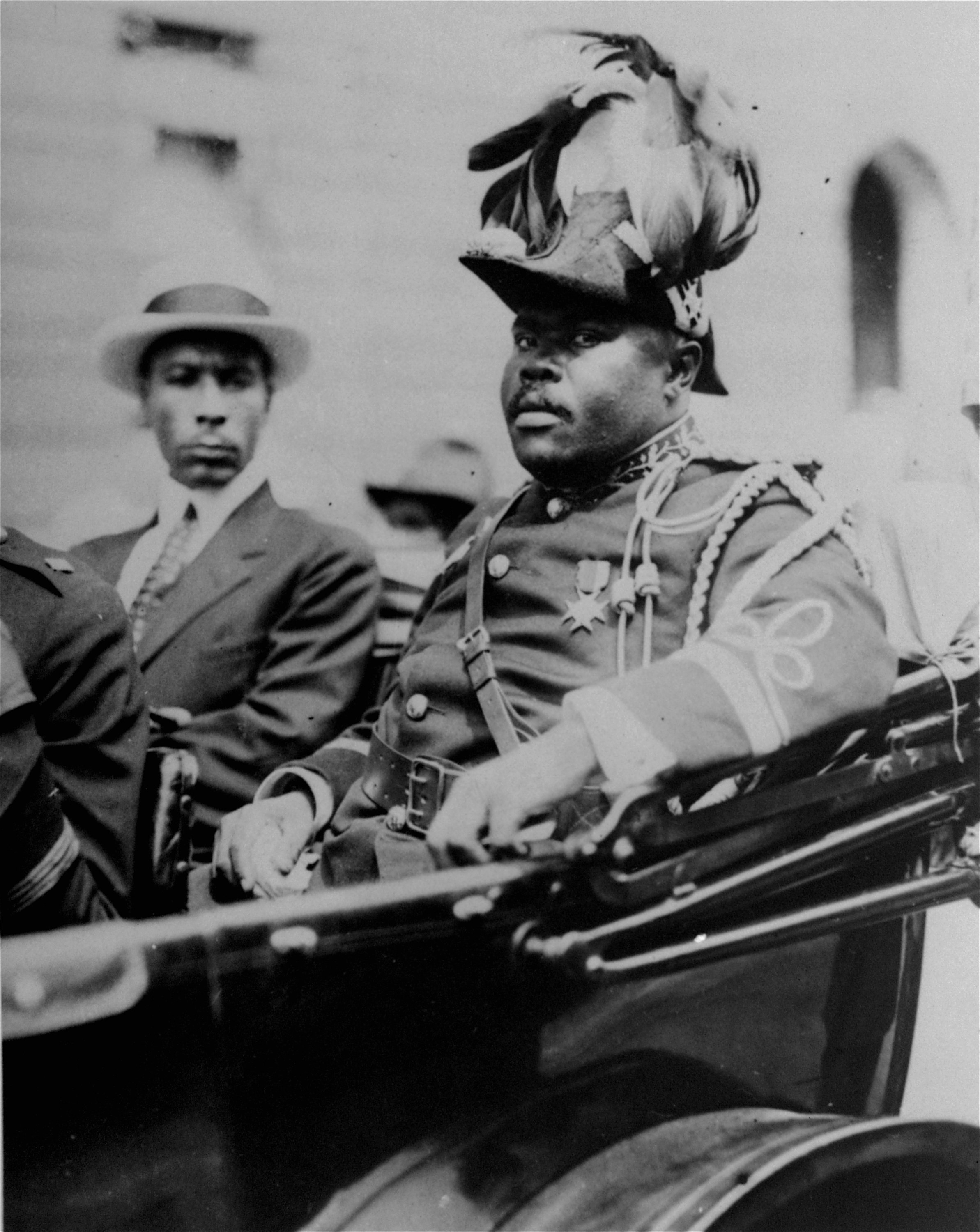
Garvey in a military uniform as the "Provisional President of Africa" during a parade on the opening day of the annual Convention of the Negro Peoples of the World at Lenox Avenue in Harlem, New York City, 1922

Physically, Garvey was short and stocky. He suffered from asthma, and was prone to lung infections; and throughout his adult life, he was affected by bouts of pneumonia. Tony Martin called Garvey a "restless young man", while Grant thought that Garvey had a "naïve but determined personality" in his early years. Grant noted that Garvey "possessed a single-mindedness of purpose that left no room for the kind of spectacular failure that was always a possibility."

He was an eloquent orator, with Cronon suggesting that his "peculiar gift of oratory" stemmed from "a combination of bombast and stirring heroics". Grant described Garvey's public speeches as "strange and eclectic – part evangelical […] partly formal King's English, and part lilting Caribbean speechifying". Garvey enjoyed arguing with people, and he wanted to be seen as a learned man; he read widely, particularly in history.

Cronon suggested that "Garvey's florid style of writing and speaking, his fondness for appearing in a richly colored cap and gown, and his use of the honorary degree initials "D.C.L." after his name were crude attempts to compensate" for his lack of formal academic qualifications. Grant thought that Garvey was an "extraordinary salesman who'd developed a philosophy where punters weren't just buying into a business but were placing a down payment on future black redemption." Even his enemies acknowledged that he was a skilled organiser and promoter.

For Grant, Garvey was "a man of grand, purposeful gestures". He thought that the black nationalist leader was an "ascetic" who had "conservative tastes". Garvey was a teetotaller who believed that alcohol consumption was morally reprehensible; he collected antique ceramics and enjoyed going around antique shops and flea markets and searching for items to add to his collection. He placed value on courtesy and respect, discouraging his supporters from being loutish.

Garvey enjoyed dressing up in military costumes, and he also adored regal pomp and ceremony; he believed that pageantry would stir the black masses out of their apathy, despite the accusations of buffoonery which were made by members of the African-American intelligentsia. Grant noted that Garvey had a "tendency to overstate his achievements", but Cronon thought that Garvey tended to surround himself with sycophants rather than more competent advisors. In 1947, the Jamaican historian J. A. Rogers included Garvey in his book, the World's Great Men of Colour, where he noted that "had [Garvey] ever come to power, he would have been another Robespierre", resorting to violence and terror to enforce his ideas.

Garvey was a Catholic. In 1919, he married Amy Ashwood in a Catholic ceremony, but they separated after three months. The New York court did not grant Garvey a divorce, but later, he obtained a divorce in Jackson County, Missouri. Ashwood contested the legitimacy of this divorce, and for the rest of her life, she claimed that she was Garvey's legitimate spouse. He married secondly to Amy Jacques Garvey, and they had two sons. His first son, Marcus Garvey III (also known as Marcus Jacques Garvey Jr.; 1930 – 8 December 2020), became an electrical engineer and served as the seventh president-general of the UNIA-ACL. His second son, Julius Garvey, (born 1933) became a cardiovascular surgeon.

== Reception and legacy ==
Garvey has invariably been described as the Black Moses of his race, a group psychologist and an idealist planner, an iconoclast, an egotist, a zealot, a charlatan and a buffoon. He has also been portrayed as flamboyant, dynamic, bombastic, defiant, ruthless, a dreamer and a fool. Regardless of what history will write about him, and his personal shortcomings notwithstanding, Marcus Garvey was undoubtedly the peerless champion of his race. He was a bulwark for the world-wide organization of people of African descent.

— Milfred C. Fierce in The Black Scholar, 1972

A polarizing figure, Garvey was both revered and reviled. Grant noted that views on him largely divided between two camps, one camp portrayed him as a charlatan and the other camp portrayed him as a saint; similarly, Cronon noted that Garvey was varyingly perceived as a "strident demagogue or a dedicated prophet, a martyred visionary or a fabulous con man". Martin noted that by the time Garvey returned to Jamaica in the 1920s, he was "just about the best known Black man in the whole world". The size and scope of the UNIA has also attracted attention; Mark Christian described Garvey as the leader of "the largest Black mass movement in modern history", and John Henrik Clarke termed it "the first Black mass protest crusade in the history of the United States". Garvey's ideas influenced many black people who never became paying members of the UNIA, with Graves noting that "more than anything else, Garvey gave Negroes self-assertion and self-reliance."

In Jamaica, Garvey is considered a national hero. In 1969, Jamaica's government posthumously conferred the Order of the National Hero upon him. The scholar of African-American studies Molefi Kete Asante included Garvey on his 2002 list of 100 Greatest African Americans, and in 2008, the American writer Ta-Nehisi Coates described Garvey as the "patron saint" of the black nationalist movement. Grant thought that Garvey, along with Du Bois, deserved to be seen as the "father of Pan-Africanism", and the Nigerian historian B. Steiner Ifekwe called Garvey "one of the greatest Pan-African leaders of the time". Garvey has received praise from people who believe that he was a "race patriot", and many African Americans believe that he encouraged black people to develop a sense of self-respect and pride. While he was living in the U.S., Garvey was frequently referred to—sometimes sarcastically—as the "Negro Moses", implying that like the eponymous Old Testament figure, he would lead his people out of the oppressive situation which they were living in.

In 1955, Cronon stated that while Garvey "achieved little in the way of permanent improvement" for black people, he "awakened fires of Negro nationalism that have yet to be extinguished". In Cronon's view, Garvey was important because he gave African-descended peoples a new feeling of collective pride and a sense of individual worth. Hart believed that Garvey's importance lay in the fact that he stirred millions of people who were otherwise apathetic into action. In this way, Hart believed that Garvey had helped lay the groundwork for the U.S. civil rights movement during the 1950s and 1960s, even though that movement's call for racial integration and equality within the U.S. ran contrary to Garvey's belief in racial separation and his advocacy of migration to Africa.

Garvey chiefly attracted attention because he put into powerful ringing phrases the secret thoughts of the Negro world. He told his listeners what they wanted to hear—that a black skin was not a badge of shame but rather a glorious symbol of national greatness. He promised a Negro nation in the African homeland that would be the marvel of the modern world. He pointed to Negro triumphs in the past and described in glowing syllables the glories of the future. When Garvey spoke of the greatness of the race, Negroes everywhere could forget for a moment the shame of discrimination and the horrors of lynching.

— Edmund David Cronon, one of Garvey's biographers, 1955

Kwame Nkrumah, the first president of Ghana, wrote in his autobiography that of all the works of literature which he had studied, the book that inspired him more than any other book was The Philosophy and Opinions of Marcus Garvey, or Africa for the Africans. Nkrumah went on to name Ghana's national shipping line the "Black Star Line", and there is a Black Star Square in Accra, and the Ghanaian flag also contains a black star. Ghana's national football team is also nicknamed the Black Stars.

While he was living in the U.S., Garvey faced strong opposition from many prominent figures in the African-American community as well as from leading progressive and left-wing organisations. He was also unpopular within elite sections of the African-American community, in part perhaps out of envy of his successes in attracting the support of the black masses, and in part out of concern that he was leading their community astray. Critics regarded him as an idealist, and he was sometimes regarded as "an egotist, a zealot, a charlatan and a buffoon". Garvey obtained a reputation for failing to pay his debts, and his detractors accused him of dishonesty.

Critics like Du Bois often mocked Garvey for his outfits and the grandiose titles which he gave to himself; in their view, he was embarrassingly pretentious. According to Grant, many members of the established African-American middle-class were "perplexed and embarrassed" by Garvey, who thought that the African-American working class should turn to their leadership rather than his. Concerns were also raised about his violent language because the people who raised them believed that it was inciting many Garveyites to carry out violent acts against Garvey's critics.

During his lifetime, some African Americans wondered if he really understood the racial issues which were present in U.S. society because he was a foreigner, and later African-American leaders frequently held the view that Garvey had failed to adequately address anti-black racism in his thought. Grant noted that in the years after Garvey's death, his life was primarily presented by his political opponents. Writing for The Black Scholar in 1972, the scholar of African-American studies Wilson J. Moses expressed concern about the "uncritical adulation" of Garvey within African-American political circles. In Moses' opinion, this adulation led to "red baiting" and "divisive rhetoric" about being "Blacker-than-thou". Moses argued that it was wrong for people to regard Garvey as a "man of the people" because he had a petty bourgeoise background and as a result, he had "enjoyed cultural, economic, and educational advantages which few of his black contemporaries" had enjoyed.

Posthumous pardon granted by President Joe Biden on 19 January 2025

U.S. President Joe Biden issued a full and unconditional pardon to Garvey on 19 January 2025.

=== Influence on political movements ===
In the late 1920s, Garvey had some ties to the French black movement, especially the group of the Comité de Défense de la Race Noire and the editor of its journal, Maurice Satineau. As the group was somewhat divided between a larger group of colonial reformists and a smaller group of representants of the Négritude, there was strong concern by moderate members about Garvey as they were afraid of his radical nationalist approach, resulting in a cut of the ties.

In the Colony of Jamaica, Garvey was largely forgotten in the years after his death, but interest in him was revived by the Rastafari religious movement. Jacques wrote a book about her late husband, Garvey and Garveyism, and after finding that no publishers were interested in it she self-published the volume in 1963. In 1962, when Jamaica became independent, the government hailed Garvey as a hero. In 1969, he was posthumously conferred with the Order of the National Hero by the Jamaican government. In 1975 the reggae artist Burning Spear released the album Marcus Garvey.

Interest in Garvey's ideas would also be revived in the 1960s through the growth of independent states across Africa and the emergence of the Black Power movement in the United States. Mark Christian suggested that Garveyism gave an important psychological boost to African leaders campaigning for independence from European colonial rule, while Claudius Fergus proposed that it played an important role in encouraging Africans to see the African diaspora as an "integral constituent of their own political destiny."

In his autobiography, Kwame Nkrumah, the prominent Pan-Africanist activist who became Ghana's first president, acknowledged Garvey's influence on him. The flag that Ghana adopted when it became independent adopted the colours of UNIA (See: Pan-African colours). In November 1964, Garvey's body was removed from West Kensal Green Cemetery and taken to Jamaica. There, it lay in state in Kingston's Catholic Cathedral before a motorcade took it to King George VI Memorial Park, where it was re-buried.

During a trip to Jamaica, Martin Luther King Jr. and his wife Coretta Scott King visited Garvey's shrine on 20 June 1965 and laid a wreath. In a speech he told the audience that Garvey "was the first man of color to lead and develop a mass movement. He was the first man to give millions of Negroes a sense of dignity and destiny on a mass scale and level. And he was the first man to make the Negro feel that he was somebody." The Vietnamese Communist revolutionary Ho Chi Minh said that Garvey and Korean nationalists shaped his political outlook during his stay in America. Thandeka K. Chapman believed that Garveyism contributed to the formation of the multicultural education movement during the 1960s. Chapman believed that both "Garveyism and multicultural education share the desire to see students of color learning and achieving academic success", and both allotted significant attention to generating racial pride.

=== Influence on religious movements ===
Garvey never regarded himself as a religious visionary but he was perceived as such by some of his followers. Various Bedwardites for example regarded him as the reincarnation of Moses. The Moorish Science Temple of America regarded Garvey as a prophet akin to John the Baptist in relation to their prophet Noble Drew Ali, whom they regarded as a Jesus figure. Garvey's ideas were a significant influence on the Nation of Islam, a religious group for African Americans established in the U.S. in 1930.

Garvey and Garveyism was a key influence on Rastafari, a new religious movement that appeared in 1930 Jamaica. According to the scholar of religion Maboula Soumahoro, Rastafari "emerged from the socio-political ferment inaugurated by Marcus Garvey", while for the sociologist Ernest Cashmore, Garvey was the "most important" precursor of the Rastafari movement. Rastafari does not promote all of the views that Garvey espoused, nevertheless, it shares many of them. Garvey knew of the Rastas from his time in Jamaica during the 1930s but his view of them, according to the scholar Barry Chevannes, "bordered on scorn".

According to Chevannes, Garvey would have regarded the Rastas' belief in the divinity of Haile Selassie as blasphemy. Many Rastas regard Garvey as a prophet, believing that he prophesied the crowning of Haile Selassie in a manner which was similar to how John the Baptist prophesied the coming of Jesus Christ. Many legends and tales are told about him within Jamaica's Rasta community. Many attribute him with supernatural attributes, for instance there is a tale told about him—and also independently told about the pioneering Rasta Leonard Howell—that Garvey miraculously knew that his bath had been poisoned and refused to get into it. Other stories among Jamaica's Rastas hold that Garvey never really died and remained alive, perhaps living in Africa. Some Rastas also organise meetings, known as Nyabinghi Issemblies, to mark Garvey's birthday.

=== Memorials ===
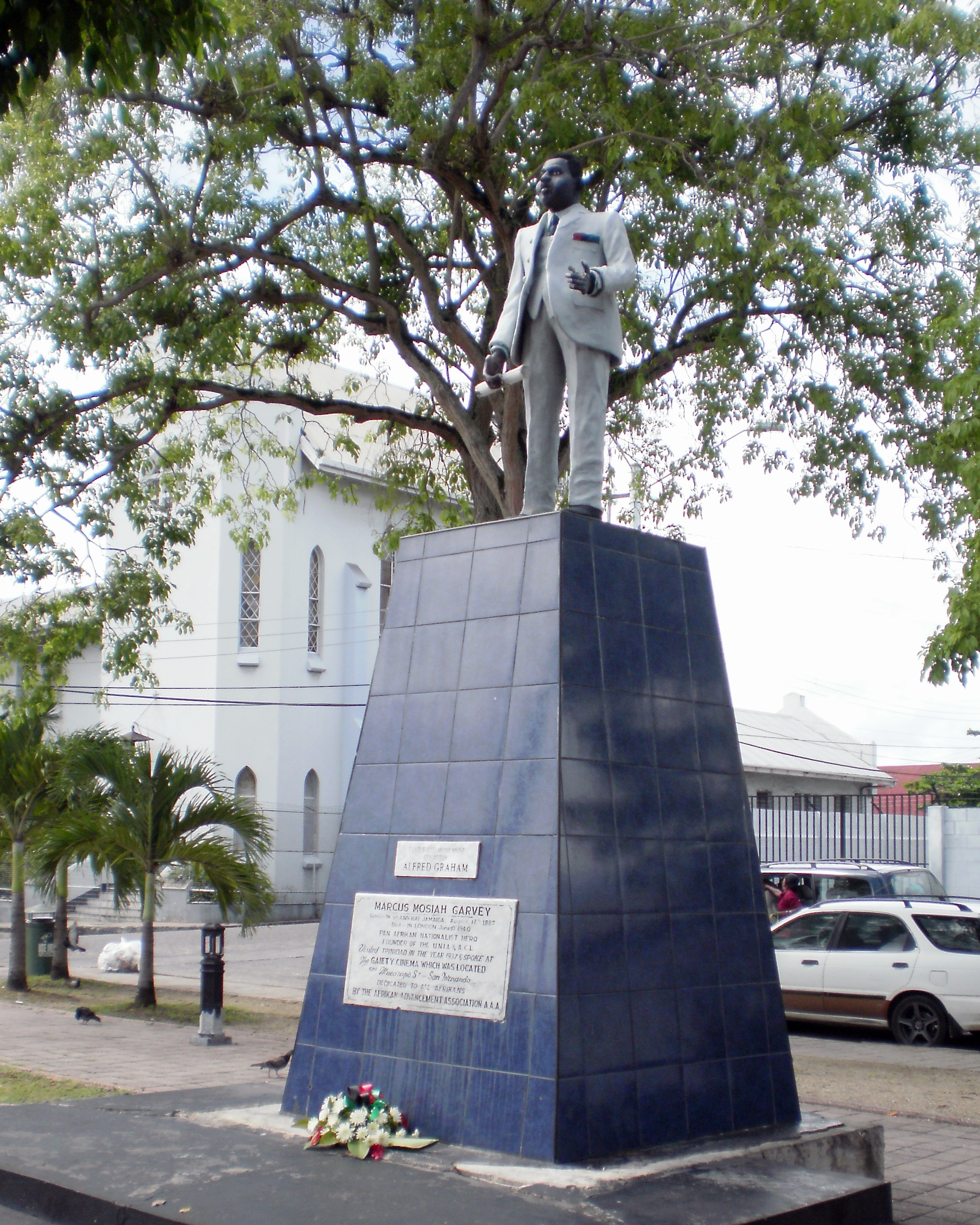
Statue of Garvey on Harris Promenade in San Fernando, Trinidad and Tobago

Garvey's birthplace, 32 Market Street, St. Ann's Bay, Jamaica, has a marker signifying it as a site of importance in the nation's history. His likeness was on the 20-dollar coin and 25-cent coin of the Jamaican dollar. In 2012 the Jamaican government declared 17 August as Marcus Garvey Day. The Governor General's proclamation stated "from here on every year this time, all of us here in Jamaica will be called to mind to remember this outstanding National Hero and what he has done for us as a people, and our children will call this to mind also on this day" and went on to say "to proclaim and make known that the 17th Day of August in each year shall be designated as Marcus Garvey Day and shall so be observed."

The Brownsville neighborhood in Brooklyn, New York City, is home to Marcus Garvey Village, whose construction was completed in 1976. Garvey Houses is another housing complex located in Brownsville.

In the 1980s, Garvey's sons launched a campaign requesting that the US government issue a pardon for their father. They had the support of Harlem-based US congressman Charles Rangel. In 2006, Jamaican Prime Minister Portia Simpson-Miller tasked various Jamaican lawyers with investigating how they could assist this campaign. The Obama administration declined to pardon Garvey in 2011, writing that its policy was not to consider posthumous pardons.

President Joe Biden posthumously pardoned Marcus Garvey on January 19, 2025, his final full day in office. The pardon was supported by members of Congress, including the Congressional Black Caucus, who said that the charges against Garvey were fabricated to discredit and silence him as a civil rights leader. President Biden's decision was seen as a significant step in acknowledging and rectifying historical injustices faced by Black leaders.

There have been several proposals to make a biopic of Garvey's life. Those mentioned in connection with the role of Garvey have included the Jamaican-born actor Kevin Navayne and the British-born actor of Jamaican descent Delroy Lindo.

In 1995 a new, private, residential road in Dulwich, London was named Marcus Garvey Mews in commemoration.

Marcus Garvey appears in Jason Overstreet's The Strivers' Row Spy, a 2016 historical novel about the Harlem Renaissance. The novel also includes as characters W. E. B. Du Bois, James Weldon Johnson, and Adam Clayton Powell, among other historically significant figures.

The 2001 documentary Marcus Garvey: Look For Me In The Whirlwind would be released as an episode of PBS tv series American Experience.

The 2021 documentary film African Redemption: The Life and Legacy of Marcus Garvey, directed by Roy T. Anderson, was made with the collaboration of Julius Garvey.

In 2023, the short film Mosiah became the first narrative film released about Marcus Garvey. The film was shot and directed by Jirard. The script was co-written by the lead actor, Samuel Lee Fudge and Jirard.

Garvey is briefly portrayed in composer Michael R. Jackson's Tony Award Best Musical A Strange Loop.

== See also ==
- Garveyism
- Hubert Harrison
- African-American literature
- The Black King (film)
- Controversial friendship with E. S. Cox
- Double-duty dollar
- Marcus Garvey: Look for me in the Whirlwind
- Right of return
- Marcus Garvey Prize for Human Rights
