= Julius Garvey =

Jamaican thorasic surgeon (born 1933)

The Honourable Julius Garvey OJ FRCS
- Born: Julius Winston Garvey; August 16, 1933 (age 93); Kingston, Colony of Jamaica, British Empire
- Citizenship: United States; Jamaica
- Education: Wolmer's Schools for Boys; McGill University
- Occupations: Cardiovascular surgeon; Medical professor
- Spouse: Constance Lynch Garvey
- Children: 3
- Parent(s): Marcus Garvey (father); Amy Jacques Garvey (mother)

Julius Winston Garvey OJ FRCS (born August 16, 1933) is a Jamaican thoracic surgeon and medical professor. He is the son of Marcus and Amy Jacques Garvey. He resides in New York.

== Personal life ==
Garvey is married to Constance Lynch and they have three children: Nzinga, Makeda and Paul.

== Awards ==
- In 2019, Garvey received the Order of Jamaica.
