= Printers' Union =

Trade union in Jamaica

The Printers' Union or Typographical Union was a trade union representing printing workers in Jamaica.

The union was established in 1907. It has been described as the first trade union in Jamaica, although the Jamaica Union of Teachers and some ephemeral unions had previously been founded. The union was divided in to three sections, covering pressmen, compositors, and bookbinders. Each section was organized as a local of a North American union, each of which was affiliated to the American Federation of Labor. The vice-president of the compositors' section was Marcus Garvey.

The union undertook a strike in Kingston, Jamaica in December 1908, which proved unsuccessful, and led to the dissolution of the union.
