= People's Political Party (Jamaica) =

Jamaican political party (founded 1929)

The People's Political Party (PPP; Jamaican Patois: Piipl’s Politikal Paati) (PPP) was Jamaica's first modern political party. It was formed in 1929 by Marcus Garvey.

The PPP set out a 14 point manifesto—the first of its kind in the island's electoral history. The points contained in the PPP's manifesto were far-reaching and perceptive as illustrated by a few of them, such as:

- An eight-hour work day
- A minimum wage
- A larger share of self-government
- Protection for native industries
- A legal aid department for the poor
- Technical schools for each parish
- Land reform
- Libraries and civic improvement for parish capitals
- City status for Montego Bay and Port Antonio
- A National Park at the Kingston Race Course

The PPP contested the 1962 elections, receiving 0.9% of the vote and failing to win a seat. The party did not contest any further elections.

In December 2012, lawyer Michael "Ras Miguel" Lorne was the party leader.
