= Amy Jacques Garvey =

Jamaican journalist and political activist (1895–1973)

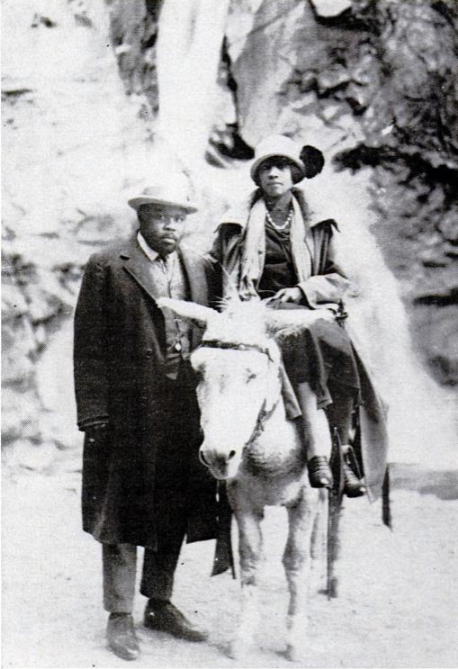
- Garvey with her husband, Marcus, in 1922
- Born: Amy Euphemia Jacques; 31 December 1895; Kingston, Jamaica
- Died: 25 July 1973 (aged 77); Kingston, Jamaica
- Other name: AJ Garvey
- Occupations: Publisher, journalist
- Known for: Activism, black nationalism, Pan-Africanism
- Spouse: Marcus Garvey (1922–1940)
- Children: 2
- Parent(s): George Samuel; Charlotte Henrietta

Amy Euphemia Jacques Garvey (31 December 1895 – 25 July 1973) was a Jamaican-born journalist and activist. She was the second wife of Marcus Garvey. She was one of the pioneering female Black journalists and publishers of the 20th century.

== Early life and education ==
Amy Euphemia Jacques was born on 31 December 1895 in Kingston, Jamaica. As the eldest child of George Samuel and Charlotte Henrietta, she was raised in a middle-class home. Ula Taylor, in her account of the life of Amy Jacques Garvey, refers to her as being "mulatta". Charlotte Henrietta was biracial, and George Samuel was a dark-skinned Black man. Taylor goes on to explain that Amy's mixed race heavily influenced her upbringing. At a young age, she was taught to play the piano and took courses in music appreciation because music and music appreciation were believed to be considered the "cultural finishing to a girl's education". Amy Jacques was a part of a small minority of Jamaican youth to attend high school. She attended Wolmer's Schools.

Amy Jacques Garvey was urged by her father to read periodicals and newspapers to "enhance" her knowledge of the world. Upon graduating school and receiving some of the highest honors of the time, Garvey was recruited to work at a law firm. Her father initially said no, refusing to allow his daughter to work in an environment with males. George Samuel died that year, and the lawyer proceeding over his estate urged Charlotte Henrietta to allow Garvey to work in the clerical office so that she could control the estate. Charlotte agreed, and Garvey worked there for four years, where she ultimately gained knowledge of the legal system.

After four years of working for this company, Garvey migrated to the United States in 1917. She promised her employer and mother that she would return in three months if conditions in the U.S. were not suitable to her; however, Garvey did not return. Karen Adler, in her article chronicling Garvey's life, argues that she did not return because she was enthralled by Garveyism.

Adler says that Amy attended a conference being held by Marcus Garvey and was moved by his words, soon afterwards assuming the role of his private secretary and working alongside him and the Universal Negro Improvement Association (UNIA). She also became involved with the publishing of the Negro World newspaper in Harlem from its inception in August 1918.

== Marriage and family ==
On July 27, 1922, several months after his previous marriage was severed, Marcus Garvey married Amy Jacques in Baltimore.

Jacques was said to have been Amy Ashwood's (Marcus Garvey's previous wife) chief bridesmaid in her wedding to Garvey. Ashwood attempted to have the second marriage annulled and failed, leaving Amy Jacques as Garvey's legitimate wife.

Jacques Garvey had two children in her marriage: Marcus Mosiah Garvey Jr. and Julius Garvey born in 1930 and 1933 respectively.

== Leadership of UNIA ==
Jacques Garvey toured nationally as a public speaker, both with and without her husband. After a western tour, Marcus Garvey was scheduled to speak in New York without her on the program.

Jacques Garvey was not scheduled to speak, however, in response to the overwhelming outcry from the crowd, the plans for the speech were altered. Adler believes that Marcus Garvey failed to show any appreciation for his wife, despite her growing fame in the public forum. Amy, however, did not pose an initial threat to Garvey. Given her strong beliefs in her position as his wife, and the structure of the organization, she took a back seat, as did other women in the UNIA . The grievances were made public at UNIA's national convention in 1922. Sexism found a means to thrive, in spite of UNIA's commitment to sexual equality. This being the case, women such as Amy Jacques Garvey, found a way to become invaluable to the organization.

While supporting her husband's ambitions and the UNIA, Jacques Garvey began to focus on her own writings, which made her known within the black community. In the UNIA’s official newspaper, The Negro World, she had have her own segment, “Our Women and What They Think”, where she focused on the struggles that Black women in America face. As a Black feminist, she emphasized the importance of Black women being educated in different aspects of life; in order to have a brighter future for the next generation, to live in a society where Black women are not seen as less than others. In writing about the newly discovered tomb of Tutankhamun in The Negro World, she argued against White, Western imperialistic views of history and showed the power and relevance of African history to African-American communities.

In light of unforeseen circumstances, Jacques Garvey was forced to assume a lead role in UNIA after Marcus was convicted of mail fraud on 21 June 1922, less than a year after their marriage. It is at this time that Garvey assumed interim leadership of UNIA. In addition to speaking all over the country to raise money for Garvey's defense fund, she edited and published volume 2 of the Philosophy and Opinions of Marcus Garvey, two volumes of his poetry, The Tragedy of White Injustice and Selections from the Poetic Meditations of Marcus Garvey. While doing this, she worked tirelessly with lawyers to get her husband out of jail, and kept the UNIA moving forward by delivering speeches and occasionally meeting with the leaders of the group. Despite the effort that she put into keeping her husband's dream alive, Marcus rarely showed appreciation towards her. Jacques Garvey never assumed official leadership of the organization because Marcus would not allow for it.

== Life after UNIA ==
After her husband was deported in 1927, Jacques Garvey went with him to Jamaica. They had two sons: Marcus Mosiah Garvey III (b. 1930) and Julius Winston Garvey (b. 1933). She remained with their children in Jamaica when Garvey moved to England in 1934.

After Marcus Garvey's death in 1940, Jacques continued the struggle for black nationalism and African independence. In 1944, she wrote "A Memorandum Correlative of Africa, West Indies and the Americas", which she used to convince the United Nations representatives to adopt an African Freedom Charter.

In November 1963, Garvey visited Nigeria as a guest of Dr. Nnamdi Azikiwe, who had been installed as the nation's first President. She published her own book, Garvey and Garveyism, in 1963, as well as a booklet entitled Black Power in America: The Power of the Human Spirit, in 1968. She also assisted John Henrik Clarke in editing Marcus Garvey and the Vision of Africa (1974). Her final work was the Philosophy and Opinions of Marcus Garvey volume III, written in conjunction with E. U. Essien-Udom.

She was awarded the Musgrave Medal in 1971.

== Works ==
Amy Jacques Garvey was an ardent writer on behalf of the UNIA movement as well as her husband, Marcus Garvey. She also wrote books regarding Pan-African, civil rights, and feminist movements. In her Women as Leaders, she mentions the importance of Black women's roles in society, and her writing serves as both a call to action and a celebration of women's capabilities in leadership positions.

Books
Title	Year published
The Philosophy and Opinions of Marcus Garvey Vol I	1923
The Philosophy and Opinions of Marcus Garvey Vol II	1925
Garvey and Garveyism	1963

Books
Title	Year published
Women as Leaders	1925

== Death ==
Amy Jacques Garvey died aged 77 on 25 July 1973, in her native Kingston, Jamaica, and was interred in the churchyard of Saint Andrew's Parish Church.
