= List of riots and civil unrest in Omaha, Nebraska =

The following is a list of riots and civil unrest in Omaha, Nebraska. With its economic roots in cattle processing, meatpacking, railroads, manufacturing and jobbing, the history of Omaha has events typical of struggles in other American cities over early 20th-century industrialization and labor problems. Racial tension was deeply based in economic and social competition as older immigrants had to contend with different ethnic groups from eastern and southern Europe and African Americans from the South. The latter were recruited for jobs in the expanding meatpacking plants as World War I shut off immigration from Europe. While numerous African Americans migrated to the city in its growing industrial phase, they were a distinct minority within the overall state population. Civil disorder in Omaha has related to the most critical events and tensions of an era, from showing support of homeless people in the 1890s; to anti-strikebreaker sentiment, focused on new Japanese residents at the turn of the 20th century; to anti-war events in the 1970s. The 1960s inner-city riots that destroyed parts of the Near North Side neighborhood were another manifestation of social and economic tension breaking out in violence.

Often the violence did little to resolve the problems at their roots: for instance, labor inequities were persistent because of major industries' opposition to unionizing and insistence on "open shop" policies into the 1940s and beyond. Just as workers were finally achieving some successes, industries underwent major restructuring, causing loss of tens of thousands of jobs and movement of industrial work away from Omaha, stranding many in the working classes for some time. The challenges facing African Americans in Omaha with regard to economic inequity and social immobility also persist but the form has varied with social and economic changes. The racial tension persists in part because of problems with crime arising from dysfunctions of poverty, entwined issues of class and race, and the relative geographic and social isolation of some of the minority communities.

== 19th century ==
In the late 19th century civil unrest in Omaha was chiefly related to labor disputes that arose with industrialization. During the 1880s and '90s, the Governor of Nebraska repeatedly sent in the state militia during labor disputes in the smelting, railroad and meatpacking house industries. In 1895 the American Protective Association threatened large-scale riots throughout the city after Nebraska state law forced a complete alteration of the police and fire boards in the city.

Riots and civil unrest in Omaha in the 19th century chronological order
Date	Issue	Event
1877	Labor dispute	A railroad riot led to nearby military units being called out to suppress the violence. The strikes were part of a nationwide series of strikes to protest the growing influence of railroad corporations in the U.S. Other similar events happened in St. Louis and Kansas City, Missouri, and Ogden, Utah. These events led General Phillip Sheridan to recommend the permanent stationing of a U.S. Army regiment in Omaha. Writing about the events, Sheridan remarked, "There is no telling when greater trouble than the Indian difficulties on the plains may exist nearer home."
July 12, 1878	Homelessness	A group of fifty homeless men forced their way onto a train near Neola, Iowa, that was bound for Omaha. The conductor wired ahead and warned officials, who waited in Council Bluffs with an armed contingent of 200 to run the men out of town. Forty were arrested; they said another 200 men were to follow the next day.
May 4, 1880	Labor dispute	Hundreds of workers at the Omaha Smelting Works surrounded the plant on May 4, and went on strike. When more than 100 black men were brought in as strikebreakers, the strikers offered to pay their fares back to their homes. The black workers reportedly accepted, joining the white workers on the picket line until transportation arrived. The strike continued until at least May 21. That day at least 700 men paraded, as city leaders threatened to bring in the state militia.
March 9, 1882	Labor dispute	The Camp Dump Strike pitted state militia against unionized strikers. Reportedly the first Omaha riot to receive national attention, on March 12 the Nebraska governor called in U.S. Army troops from Fort Omaha to protect strikebreakers at the Burlington Railroad. They brought along Gatling guns and a cannon for defense, and the event purportedly ended.
November 13, 1887	Politics	A crowd of 200 gathered in the Sheelytown (ethnic Irish) neighborhood of South Omaha and threatened the anarchists who hung an anarchist flag outside a building. As a larger crowd started gathering, police arrived and removed the flag without further incident.
August 2, 1891	Labor dispute	A mob of 500 attacked the Omaha Granite and Smelting Works, later an ASARCO facility, damaging property and driving out workers. Police were reported powerless against the mob, and the mob was labeled drunk.
October 8, 1891	Lynching	Joe Coe, also known as George Smith, a 50-year-old African-American railroad porter, was lynched by a mob after being accused of raping a 14-year-old. Coe had an alibi and witnesses attesting to his innocence. Because he had been convicted of rape several years before in neighboring Council Bluffs, the mob assumed he was guilty of this event. A crowd of 10,000 gathered for the lynching.
1893	Labor dispute	A strike by hundreds of butchers in South Omaha's packing houses was broken by the government bringing in six companies of militias and strikebreakers.
April 22, 1894	Unemployment	Kelly's Army, an "industrial army" of 2000 homeless men, were traveling from California to Washington, D.C. to protest the continuing recession, at the time the worst in the country's history. They traveled through Omaha. Kelly's Army was halted in Council Bluffs when a mob of Omaha supporters stopped a train bound for St. Louis, Missouri. They intended to commandeer the train for Kelly's Army, but were stopped by military forces from Fort Omaha. When the supporters had first tried to get a train in Council Bluffs, they were thwarted by the railroads. They crossed back over the Ak-Sar-Ben Bridge and went to the Union Pacific Yards to get an engine and several cars. But, "General" Kelly would not accept the stolen equipment. Soon Kelly's Army kept moving into Iowa on foot.
August 6, 1894	Labor dispute	A general strike called on July 29 escalated when workers in the South Omaha meatpacking plants were replaced by strikebreakers. Widespread violence was reported against the imported laborers, and two companies of Nebraska state militia arrived on August 10 to protect them. After their arrival, workers continued unabated. The strike was broken September 10.
March 12, 1895	Religious conflict	Fighting among Polish immigrants at St. Paul's Catholic Church in Omaha included clubs, fist fighting and a gunfight between a fake priest of the parish and parishioners who supported the local Bishop. When the Bishop took the side of the parishioners against the priest over ownership of the church, the case went to the U.S. Supreme Court. When the Court ruled in favor of the Bishop, the dissident priest and his supporters burnt the building to the ground. The congregation disbanded and never reformed.
November 18, 1898	Transportation	After the Trans-Mississippi Exposition many of the large streetcars employed to carry throngs of passengers were removed from service by the Omaha and Council Bluffs Railway and Bridge Company. In the face of increasingly uncomfortable crowding on the small cars, a large demonstration by a group of residents from the Walnut Hill suburb took over several streetcars in the city to protest.
February 5, 1899	Legal process	Dozens of people were locked into the Vendome Hotel in Downtown Omaha during a smallpox outbreak that primarily afflicted guests. Several guests, mainly traveling businessmen, stirred to riot-like proportions when they were kept in the building after almost a week, claiming they were denied due process by being incarcerated against their wills.

== 20th century ==
Social tensions related to two world wars and several labor disputes resulted in violent upheavals in the first half of the 20th century, including the lynching of a black man in Omaha, followed by a race riot in 1919. The first recorded incidences of recorded racial discrimination occurred, pitting whites against Japanese and Greek immigrants. The emerging civil rights movement in Omaha raised expectations and the Vietnam War produced its own tensions. In the 1960s, African Americans violently protested in several different events, reacting against police brutality and other issues.

Riots and civil unrest in Omaha from 1900 to 1929 chronological order
Date	Issue	Event
June 28, 1902	Labor dispute	Protesters at the Union Pacific shops in Downtown Omaha go on strike with 1,800 workers affected across the Western United States. On September 14, 1902, a strikebreaker is killed by a group affiliated with the strikers.
May 14, 1903	Labor dispute	3,000 teamsters, restaurant workers, freight package handlers, and members of the building trades strike in Omaha. Governor John H. Mickey was called in to arbitrate after several days of protests. The protesters riot in Downtown Omaha after strikebreakers are called in to move wagons westward with supplies from Jobbers Canyon.
July 28, 1904	Labor dispute	5,000 South Omaha laborers walkout in solidarity with general laborers whose salaries were cut across the board on July 12. The Douglas County sheriff assumed full control of policing in South Omaha during packinghouse strikes. The meatpacking companies were found to have hired a gang from Colorado called "Reno's thugs," who were responsible for inciting riots in mining strikes in Colorado to create crises needing U.S. Army intervention. After assuring the company owners that the county sheriff would keep the peace, he and his officers ran the gang out of town. On August 24 stockyards lawyers asked the U.S. Army to protect trainloads of strikebreakers traveling into South Omaha in order to keep them safe. After the plants were forced to close for several weeks in August and September, the strike was broken; former laborers lost 300 positions and wages.
April 17, 1905	Race relations	More than 800 students, children of European immigrant laborers in South Omaha, protested the presence of ethnically Japanese students, the children of strikebreakers. Protesting students locked adults out of their school buildings.
March 15, 1906	Lynching	A mob of 500 men attacked the second Douglas County Courthouse and jail in an attempt to lynch eight murderers. The crowd had threatened the lynching for three nights and attacked on March 15 using clubs, crowbars and ropes. The sheriff told them he had moved the men out. The crowd persisted in calling for dynamite to destroy the jail, and police called the Omaha Fire Department to assist. In zero-degree weather they sprayed the mob, who retreated and did not return.
May 13, 1906	Politics	A group of 1,000 citizens surround the Old City Hall in Downtown Omaha after a Republican-controlled Omaha City Council refused to allow a new Democratic-controlled City Council to assume their positions. The former city councilmen relinquished their control under threat.
February 20, 1909	Race relations	A Greek immigrant was arrested for loitering after being accused of having sex with a white woman. During the arrest, a police officer was shot. The accused man was captured later. The Greek Town Riot started with a mob of 3,000 men gathered outside the South Omaha jail where the Greek immigrant was being held. Police distracted the crowd while the prisoner was moved to the Omaha City Jail, but after discovering this, the mob marched to Greektown, a local ethnic enclave. They forced all of Greek residents living there to abandon the area, destroyed businesses, completely demolished 30 buildings and set fire to the neighborhood.
September 19- September 23, 1909	Labor dispute	Several days of rioting ensued as the Amalgamated Association of Street and Electric Railway Employees tried to unionize workers in Gurdon Wattles's Omaha Traction Company, which ran the streetcars. Wattles resisted and hired strikebreakers to cross picket lines. Threatening the unionists and refusing arbitration, Wattles provoked pro-union mobs. They destroyed streetcars, terrorized company officials, and attacked strikebreakers. Wattles broke the strike in October, and workers agreed to his terms in order to return. Wattles later wrote a booklet about the events entitled A Crime Against Labor: A Brief History of the Omaha and Council Bluffs Street Railway Strike, 1909.
July 4, 1910	Race relations	After a tremendous upset victory by African-American boxer Jack Johnson in Reno, Nevada, mobs of whites roamed throughout Omaha rioting, as they did in cities across the U.S. The mobs wounded several black men in the city and killed one.
September 28, 1919	Lynching	Willy Brown is lynched by a mob with 10,000 spectators in Downtown Omaha. The mob almost burned down the new Douglas County Courthouse in order to take Brown from his cell. This was reported to be the first instance in the 20th century of the U.S. Army becoming involved in quelling urban rioting. This large riot shortly followed those of Red Summer, when post-war tensions led to ethnic white attacks against blacks in race riots in numerous cities across the country, increasing fears and tensions in Omaha as well.
March 12, 1921	Labor dispute	6,000 strikers at the South Omaha meatpacking houses left their jobs, disrupting traffic and businesses throughout the community. In December additional police were called in to abate civil disorder caused by strikers.

=== The Great Depression ===
The Great Depression forced millions of people out of work through the 1930s and caused upheaval across the U.S. The struggle for control over work was a struggle for life, and most Americans were affected.

Riots and civil unrest in Omaha during the Great Depression chronological order
Date	Issue	Event
August 1932	Economic depression	Seeking to increase prices paid for farm produce farmers blockaded roads into Omaha. For three nights picketers clashed with police, including one incident where 1,000 bystanders watched as forty deputies were pelted with logs and rocks as they led farm trucks through a picket line blocking Dodge Street.
1933	Economic depression	Farmers tried to drive home the impact of the Great Depression on their operations in the Milk Strike of 1933. Bands of farmers roaming the streets of the city overturned milk delivery trucks in the streets as they found them. The strike is noted as having failed.
April 1935	Labor dispute	A fragile truce between pro-open shop management of Wattles' Omaha Traction Company, that ran the streetcars, and pro-union labor forces broke, causing a long, violent strike. The company hired strikebreakers from Brooklyn. Within days the company rolled out heavily fortified streetcars, complete with windows covered by heavy wire and armed guards on board. While few cars attracted passengers, the cars initially encountered little resistance. The company resisted calls for arbitration from the Omaha City Council and continued employing strikebreakers. In early May violence broke out, with workers' attacking the streetcars and strikebreakers by rifle attacks, violent beatings and bombings across the city. In June riots broke out with mobs' burning streetcars and looting. There were two deaths. The city government lost control of the violence and called in the National Guard, which sent 1,800 troops. Governor Robert Cochran declared martial law and ordered the streetcars to stop running. After the governor intervened and owner Wattles agreed to arbitration, a number of agreements were made with workers' representatives. But no substantive changes were made and strikebreakers stayed on the job. The violence ended, court cases ensued, and the situation slowly faded away. The Omaha Traction Company never unionized.
June 14, 1935	Labor dispute	Three days of more streetcar strike rioting leads to a man being killed and more than ninety persons, including women and children, were wounded. Governor Robert Leroy Cochran ordered arbitration later in the week; however, new riots were reported by the end of the month. 1,800 National Guardsmen were called in to quell the violence, and martial law was declared. Ultimately two people were killed and 100 were injured.
February 23, 1942	Athletic funding	Students at Omaha University formed picket lines to protest the reduction in funds for athletic programs at the college. Their actions forced the closure of OU for several days and disrupted traffic along Dodge Street, the primary thoroughfare in the city.

=== Post-World War II ===
The aftermath of World War II brought apparent tranquility to much of the nation. However, in working class cities such as Omaha, labor unrest continued to weigh heavily on industry while the middle class was burgeoning. Restructuring of major industries rapidly cost tens of thousands of jobs in Omaha in the railroad and meatpacking industries in the decades after 1950. Members of the working class who could not quickly adapt were isolated in North and South Omaha as the economy retracted. With decreasing revenues, the city and businesses decreased investments in existing housing and infrastructure. At the same time, the city was expanding away from the river, with growth to new suburbs and development in the west, leading to white flight from many inner-city neighborhoods. Some new-style white collar jobs migrated to that area as well, or were concentrated in downtown.

Post World War II riots and civil unrest in Omaha chronological order
Date	Issue	Event
June 24, 1947	Labor dispute	The Omaha Stockyards, along with much of South Omaha, were shut down after workers walked out over labor conditions.
1948	Race relations	Thirty members of the DePorres Club held Omaha's first sit-in at a restaurant by the Douglas County Courthouse. When the group arrived, the owner told them that white customers would stop coming into the restaurant if blacks were served. In response, the group stayed until the owner agreed to allow African-American patrons.
1959	Anti-nuclear proliferation	Karl H. Meyer, the son of Vermont Representative William H. Meyer, is arrested after participating in an anti-nuclear missile protest by the Committee for Non-Violent Action in Omaha.

=== Civil rights and Vietnam War protests ===
The Civil Rights Movement in the United States and in Omaha resulted in demands against racism and for black power in the city, at a time when youth throughout the city were being drafted to fight in the Vietnam War. Resistance increased to what was perceived as mistreatment and police brutality, resulting in protests and riots, the repercussions of which are still felt today in some communities.

Riots and civil unrest related to civil rights and the Vietnam War chronological order
Date	Issue	Event
July 4, 1966	Race relations	After a 103-degree day, a crowd of African Americans gathered at North 24th and Lake streets in the evening. They responded violently when the Omaha Police Department requested their dispersal. The crowd demolished police cars and roamed the North 24th Street business corridor, throwing firebombs and demolishing storefronts. Millions of dollars of damage was caused to businesses in the Near North Side community. The riot lasted three days.
August 1, 1966	Race relations	Riots erupted after a 19-year-old was shot by a white, off-duty policeman during a burglary. The Omaha World-Herald and local television stations were criticized for blaming African Americans for their deteriorating neighborhoods, which had been redlined. Three buildings were firebombed, and 180 riot police were required to quell the crowds.
March 4, 1968	Race relations	A crowd of high school and university students met at the Omaha Civic Auditorium to protest the presidential campaign of George Wallace, the segregationist governor of Alabama. Counter-protesters began acting violently but police brutality led to the injury of dozens of protesters. An African-American youth was shot and killed by an officer, and fleeing students caused thousands of dollars of damage to businesses and cars. The following day local barber Ernie Chambers helped prevent a riot at Horace Mann Junior High School. Recognized as a community leader, Chambers finished his law degree and was elected to the Nebraska State Legislature, serving a record total of 46 years.
June 24, 1969	Race relations	African-American teenager Vivian Strong was shot and killed by police officer James Loder in an incident at the Logan Fontenelle Housing Project. In response, young African Americans, led by the Black Association for Nationalism Through Unity (BANTU), rioted throughout the Near North Side, looting the North 24th Street business corridor. During this attack, eight businesses were destroyed. Rioting went on for several more days.
July 10, 1971	Anti-war	The city was on alert after four days and nights of Anti-Vietnam War protests at Memorial Park. Thousands of youth activists were involved.

== 21st century ==
Instances of mass violence in the 21st century have taken the form of police response to protests against police brutality: the George Floyd protests in Nebraska and protests of the Shooting of James Scurlock.

Riots and civil unrest in Omaha in the 21st century chronological order
Date	Issue	Event
May 29–30, 2020	Police brutality Race relations	Thousands of protesters gathered at 72nd and Dodge to protest the murder of George Floyd. They were attacked by police with physical force, tear gas, and rubber bullets. Protesters were driven into downtown Omaha, where a Black man named James Scurlock was killed by a white bar owner in an alleged act of self-defense, prolonging the riots. The shooter later committed suicide to avoid charges.
June 5, 2020	Police brutality	Hundreds of activists memorialized Zachary Bear Heels, who died during an altercation with Omaha Police three years earlier, by retracing his final steps and holding a rally denouncing police violence.
July 25, 2020	Police brutality	Omaha activists marched in support of the people of Portland, Oregon because of the deployment of federal troops there. A group of 150-200 protestors was observed by the police blocking traffic on multiple Omaha streets. A mass arrest of 120 protestors took place on a highway overpass after multiple warnings by police were made to the protestors to stop blocking traffic. Protestors were trapped on the overpass by police, who then fired pepper balls into the trapped crowd. Official accounts stated that pepperballs were fired after a bicyclist rode towards the officers, and another man interfered as the bicyclist was arrested. Arrestees were detained on the bridge for up to six hours, then jailed for up to 24 hours. Overcrowded jail cells put protestors at risk during the COVID-19 pandemic.
October 5 – December 21, 2021	Labor dispute	Workers from a Kellogg's plant, unionized as members of the Bakery, Confectionery, Tobacco Workers and Grain Millers' International Union (BCTGM) struck and protested outside the plant. The strike was caused due to disagreements between the union and company concerning the terms of a new labor contract, with particular points of contention concerning the current two-tier wage system (with legacy workers making $35/hr and new hires $22/hr), health care, holidays, retirement benefits, cost-of-living adjustments, and vacation time. The demonstration spanned several block surrounding the plant at 120th & I St.

== See also ==
- Ethnic groups in Omaha, Nebraska
- Timeline of racial tension in Omaha, Nebraska
- A Time for Burning
- Crime in Omaha
- History of Omaha
- List of incidents of civil unrest in the United States

== Bibliography ==
- Pratt, W.C. "Advancing Packinghouse unionism in South Omaha, 1917-1920," Journal of the West. 35:2, 42–49.
- Warren, W.J. "The impasse of radicalism and race: Omaha's meatpacking unionism, 1945-1955," Journal of the West. 35:2, 50–54.
- Fogarty, H.A. "Long Packinghouse Strike Hurts Business in Omaha," The New York Times. May 2, 1948.
- "An Omaha Bicyclist Mobbed", The New York Times. June 21, 1895.
