= Timeline of racial tension in Omaha, Nebraska =

The timeline of racial tension in Omaha, Nebraska lists events in African-American history in Omaha. These included racial violence, but also include many firsts as the black community built its institutions. Omaha has been a major industrial city on the edge of what was a rural, agricultural state. It has attracted a more diverse population than the rest of the state. Its issues were common to other major industrial cities of the early 20th century, as it was a destination for 19th and 20th century European immigrants, and internal white and black migrants from the South in the Great Migration. Many early 20th-century conflicts arose out of labor struggles, postwar social tensions and economic problems, and hiring of later immigrants and black migrants as strikebreakers in the meatpacking and stockyard industries. Massive job losses starting in the 1960s with the restructuring of the railroad, stockyards and meatpacking industries contributed to economic and social problems for workers in the city.

== 19th century ==
Events reflecting racial tension in 19th century Omaha (in chronological order)
| Date | Issue | Event |
|---|---|---|
| 1804 | Slavery | The first recorded instance of a black person in the Omaha area is York, who arrives in Omaha area as a slave of William Clark of the Lewis and Clark Expedition. |
| 1854 | Slavery | Nebraska Territory created by Congress with condition that the area stay free of slavery. |
| 1855 | Slavery | Ongoing debate occurs in the early Territorial Legislature regarding slavery. |
| 1859 | Slavery | "The bill introduced in Omaha City Council, for the abolition of slavery in this Territory, was called up yesterday, and its further consideration postponed for two weeks. A strong effort will be made among the Republicans to secure its passage; we think, however, it will fail. The farce certainly cannot be enacted if the Democrats do their duty." - From an 1859 Daily Nebraskan newspaper. |
| 1860 | Slavery | The Omaha-based Nebraskan newspaper quotes the Chicago Times and Herald regarding a slave named "Eliza" who ran away from an Omaha businessman to Chicago and was arrested there under the Fugitive Slave Act. |
| 1860 | Slavery | Census shows 81 Negroes in Nebraska, 10 of whom were slaves. |
| 1865 | Racism | A clause in the original proposed Nebraska State Constitution limited voting rights in the state to "free white males". This kept Nebraska from entering the Union for almost a year. |
| 1867 | African American Churches | St. John's African Methodist Episcopal Church organizes as the first church for African Americans in Nebraska. |
| 1891 | Lynching | A man called Joe Coe, an African-American, is lynched by a mob for allegedly raping a white woman. No one was charged or convicted for his murder. |
| 1894 | Racial segregation | The first African-American fair held in the United States takes place in Omaha in July. |
| 1899 | Police brutality | A local black singer named J. A. Smith died while in custody at the Omaha jail. Arrested for "loud talking" on a public street, Smith and an accomplice were moving through the building when he and an officer had an altercation, and he struck out. The officer struck back at Smith, who fell against a bench and later died. A police examiner thought there was something resembling a stiletto wound in the back of his skull. Anton Inda, the officer, was charged with murder. |

== 1900 to 1950 ==
Events reflecting racial tension in Omaha from 1900 to 1950 (in chronological order)
| Date | Issue | Event |
|---|---|---|
| 1905 | Labor unrest | More than 800 students, children of European immigrant laborers in South Omaha, protested the presence of Japanese students, the children of strikebreakers. Protesting students locked adults out of their school buildings. |
| 1907 | | Mayor "Cowboy" James Dahlman lassoed the editors of the Law Journal of Tokyo during their diplomatic visit to Omaha after they asked him about cow punching. |
| 1909 | Race Riot | The Greek Town Riot destroyed a successful Greek immigrant community in South Omaha. A mob of 3,000 men burnt the community to the ground after a Greek immigrant shot an ethnic Irish policeman while being taken into custody. Greek residents were forced by the mob to leave town. |
| 1910 | Civil rights | African Americans build an "Old Colored Folks Home" in North Omaha. |
| 1910 | Race Riot | After a tremendous upset victory by African-American boxer Jack Johnson in Reno, Nevada, mobs of whites roamed throughout Omaha rioting, as they did in cities across the U.S. The mobs wounded several black men in the city and killed one. |
| 1912 | Civil rights | Omaha chapter of the National Association for the Advancement of Colored People opens. |
| 1917 | Black nationalism | George Wells Parker founds the Hamitic League of the World in Omaha. |
| 1918 | Labor unrest | As veterans from World War I attempt to return to their civilian jobs, violent strikes break out in the South Omaha meat packing industry when they discover African American and Eastern European immigrants in their former positions. |
| 1918 | Black nationalism | Cyril Briggs becomes editor of the African Blood Brotherhood journal, The Crusader, which is printed and distributed in Omaha. |
| 1919 | Lynching | African-American Willy Brown is lynched by a mob from South Omaha after being accused of raping a white woman from that neighborhood, during the Omaha race riot of 1919, sparked by white political boss Tom Dennison. There was a background of resentment against blacks among the ethnic and immigrant white working class in South Omaha because blacks were hired as strikebreakers. The reformist mayor Edward Parsons Smith tried to calm the crowd, for which they also attempted to lynch him. He was only saved by a last minute rescue. The sheriff and police could not control the mob, which numbered in the thousands. No perpetrators were brought to trial. US Army troops were stationed in South Omaha to prevent another mob from forming among white immigrants and ethnic Americans, and in North Omaha to protect the black community. This large riot shortly followed those of Red Summer, when post-war tensions led to ethnic white attacks against blacks in race riots in numerous cities across the country, increasing fears and tensions in Omaha as well. |
| 1920s | Racial segregation | Racial segregation becomes normalized as redlining and restrictive covenants keep African Americans in North Omaha. Harry Haywood is said to have become radicalized by the white mob rule that overtook South Omaha in 1919, which drove him to become a leader of the Communist Party of America. |
| 1920 | Racial segregation | The Colored Commercial Club organizes to help blacks secure employment and to encourage business enterprises among African Americans in Omaha. |
| 1921 | Labor unrest | Violent strikes broke out in the South Omaha meatpacking plants in reaction to African-American and Eastern-European workers, as well as attempts by labor to organize the plants. |
| 1921 | Black Power | Earl Little, Malcolm X's father, founds the Omaha chapter of Marcus Garvey's Universal Negro Improvement Association. |
| 1921 | White supremacy | The Ku Klux Klan reports its first Klavern in Nebraska being formed in Omaha. |
| 1926 | White supremacy | After being born in Omaha in 1925, Malcolm X's family was forced to move from their home in North Omaha by the Ku Klux Klan's threatening Earl Little and his family's safety. |
| 1927 | Civil rights | The Omaha Urban League (now the Urban League of Nebraska) was founded. It is the first chapter of the National Urban League in the American West. |
| 1929 | Civil rights | Whitney Young leads the Urban League in Omaha to triple its membership. |
| 1930s | Civil rights | The Knights and Daughters of Tabor, also known as the "Knights of Liberty", was founded in Omaha in this decade as a secret African-American organization whose goal was "nothing less than the destruction of slavery." |
| 1938 | Civil rights | Mildred Brown founds the Omaha Star with her husband, likely becoming the first woman, and definitely the first African-American woman, to found a newspaper in the U.S. She continued the paper for 50 years on her own, for the rest of her life. It celebrated African-American contributions and successes in Omaha and America, and became the only newspaper for African Americans in Nebraska. Her niece continues to operate the paper since Brown's death. |
| 1942 | Racial segregation | Alfonza W. Davis from Omaha fights in the segregated unit known as the Tuskegee Airmen. He is presumed KIA when his aircraft disappears in 1944. |
| 1947 | Community organizing | The DePorres Club begins at Creighton University, actively seeking to fight racial discrimination in Omaha's housing and job markets. |
| 1948 | Community organizing | The DePorres Club stages Omaha's first sit-in at a restaurant in the Douglas County Courthouse in Downtown Omaha with 30 members joining. The restaurant commits to desegregation. |
| 1948 | Community organizing | Mildred Brown invites the DePorres Club to meet at the offices of the Omaha Star after it was kicked off of Creighton's campus. |

== 1950 to 2000 ==
According to several prominent Omaha historians, racial discrimination was a significant issue in Omaha from the 1950s through the 2000s (decade). Analyzing race relations in Omaha during the period they commented, "1968 rivals 1919 as probably the worst year in the history of twentieth-century America from the standpoint of violence and internal tension." In 1969 three days of rioting swept the Near North Side, and in 1970 a policeman was killed by a suitcase bomb while answering a disturbance call at a house in North Omaha. However, as the 1966 Oscar-nominated documentary A Time for Burning and the 1970s books of Lois Mark Stalvey illustrated, the violence apparently served a purpose as lines of communication were opened between the "West Omaha matron and the black laborer."

Events reflecting racial tension in Omaha from 1950 to 2000 (in chronological order)
| Date | Issue | Event |
|---|---|---|
| 1950s | Racial discrimination | "We Don't Serve Any Colored Race." - Signs are posted in café windows throughout the city. |
| 1952-54 | Boycott | The Omaha Bus Boycott was led by the DePorres Club, including Mildred Brown, who extolled readers of the Omaha Star stating "Don’t ride Omaha’s buses or streetcars. If you must ride, protest by using 18 pennies." Focusing on ending the Omaha and Council Bluffs Street Railway Company's policy of not hiring black drivers, the boycott was successful. |
| 1955 | Community organizing | Picketing and other protests are held at Peony Park after the amusement park refuses to allow black athletes to participate in a regional swim meet. A Nebraska Supreme Court trial finds the park guilty of violating the state's desegregation laws and fines it $50. |
| 1958 | Community organizing | A group of African-American educators in Omaha Public Schools start a professional caucus called Concerned and Caring Educators. |
| 1958 | Civil rights movement | Rev. Dr. Martin Luther King Jr. preached at Salem Baptist Church in North Omaha. |
| 1962 | Community organizing | North Omaha resident Bertha Calloway forms the Negro History Society. |
| 1963 | Civil rights movement | The Citizens Civic Committee for Civil Liberties, or 4CL, led by Black ministers, rallies to demand change civil rights for all African Americans in Omaha through picketing, stand-ins during city council meetings, and other efforts. |
| 1963 | Civil rights movement | The Omaha Human Rights Commission is created, holding a rally of more than 10,000 people later in the year. However, organizations such as 4CL were suspicious that the Commission, led by Omaha's mayor at the time James Dworak, was a stalling tactic. |
| 1963 | Youth activism | Black Association for Nationalism Through Unity (BANTU) was founded in Omaha to rally high school student activists towards action. |
| 1963 | Youth activism | Local youth activists were successful in bringing down the color barrier at Peony Park, the city's main amusement park, after protesting at the admission gates for several weeks. |
| 1964 | Black Power | Malcolm X speaks in Omaha. |
| 1966 | Race Riot | National Guard quells two days of rioting in North Omaha in July. |
| 1966 | Racial discrimination | A Time for Burning, a documentary made featuring North Omaha and its issues, is released. Later that year it is nominated for an Oscar. |
| 1968 | Race Riot | National Guard quells North Omaha riots in April after the assassination of Martin Luther King Jr. |
| 1968 | Civil rights movement | Robert F. Kennedy visits North Omaha in his quest to become president, speaking in support of Omaha's civil rights activists. |
| 1969 | Race Riot | Riots erupt in June after James Loder, an Omaha police officer, fatally shoots teenager Vivian Strong in the Logan Fontenelle Housing Project in North Omaha. |
| 1969 | Youth Activism | 54 black students staged a sit-in at the office of the University of Nebraska at Omaha president to lobby for African American history courses and student voices at the institution. |
| 1970s | Urban renewal | Construction of the North Freeway bisects North Omaha, cutting the African-American community in half and marring its social fabric. |
| 1970 | Political activism | Ernie Chambers from North Omaha elected to Nebraska State Legislature. |
| 1970 | COINTELPRO | On August 17 an Omaha police officer is killed when an explosive blows up in an abandoned house in North Omaha. August 28 an African-American man named Duane Peak is arrested, and he implicates six others. August 31 David Rice and Ed Poindexter are arrested, despite not having been originally implicated. |
| 1971 | COINTELPRO | Rice and Poindexter were convicted of murder in the controversial Rice/Poindexter Case. |
| 1971 | Black studies | University of Nebraska-Omaha starts a Department of Black Studies in response to student activism. |
| 1974 | COINTELPRO | Appeal for retrial of Rice and Poindexter denied by the Nebraska State Supreme Court. |
| 1976 | Racial integration | Omaha Public Schools begins court-ordered integrated busing. |
| 1976 | Community organizing | Negro History Society with leadership of Bertha Calloway formally opens the Great Plains Black History Museum in the Webster Telephone Exchange Building to celebrate African-American contributions to the city and region. |
| 1981 | White Supremacy | Arsonists blaze an East Omaha duplex after an African-American family signs a rental agreement there. The arson is unsolved. |
| 1993 | COINTELPRO | The Nebraska Parole Board votes unanimously and repeatedly to commute Rice and Poindexter's sentences to time served; however, the Nebraska Board of Pardons refuses to schedule a hearing in the matter. |
| 1995 | White Supremacy | Arsonists tip over and fire an African-American woman's car in East Omaha at the same location as the 1981 arson. Both cases are unsolved. |
| 1996 | Racial integration | Omaha Public Schools ends court-ordered busing. |
| 1997 | Police brutality | Marvin Ammons, an African-American Gulf War veteran, is shot and killed by an Omaha police officer. A grand jury indicts the officer for manslaughter, then the judgment was thrown out for jury misconduct. A second grand jury acquits the officer of wrongdoing and admonishes the Omaha Police Department for mishandling the case. |

== 2000s ==
Events reflecting racial tension in Omaha from 2000 to present (in chronological order)
| Date | Issue | Event |
|---|---|---|
| 2000 | Police brutality | George Bibins, an African American who leads Omaha police on a high speed chase, is shot and killed by officer Jared Kruse at the end of the chase. Charges are filed against the officer, but special prosecutors force them to be presented to a grand jury which declines to recommend charges. The Omaha Police Department does not make a decision on the use of force because Jared Kruse refused to be questioned and is allowed to retire a year later for PTSD. A second jury in the civil case refuses to award damages to Bibins' family. |
| 2000 | Institutional racism | Nebraska State Legislature sets term limits, with some using this action to target Ernie Chambers. |
| 2003 | Institutional racism | An African-American gang member shoots Jason Tye Pratt, an Omaha police officer. US Attorney General John Ashcroft visits Pratt's wife and makes a statement admonishing a Douglas County District Judge for offering the gang member second chances in past offenses. |
| 2004 | Institutional racism | Omaha police officer Tariq Al-Amin is fired from the police department for comments he made during a television show. He appeals and is reinstated with the maximum penalty allowed by police union contract, along with an apology for his comment. |
| 2006 | Racial Segregation | Ernie Chambers proposes separating Omaha Public Schools into three districts that reflect the city's racial composition: one for the predominantly white western part of Omaha, one for the now predominantly Hispanic South Omaha, and one for predominantly black North Omaha. The Nebraska State Legislature approves the plan to be implemented in 2008. The NAACP challenges the proposed educational funding plan in court, but the case is thrown out by the Nebraska Supreme Court under the Political question doctrine. In response to a separate lawsuit, Legislature revises the school funding formula and enacts other legislation to attempt to address the need for more equitable school funding and improved services for 'at-risk' students. |
| 2020 | Police brutality | Omaha George Floyd protests are met with police brutality. During the protests, a white bar owner shot and killed unarmed Black protestor James Scurlock. No charges were filed, which lead to more protests. |

== See also ==
- History of North Omaha, Nebraska
- Timeline of North Omaha, Nebraska history
- History of Omaha, Nebraska
- Civil Rights Movement in Omaha, Nebraska
- African Americans in Omaha, Nebraska
- Greeks in Omaha, Nebraska
- Timeline of riots and civil unrest in Omaha, Nebraska
- Racial tension in Omaha, Nebraska
- Ernie Chambers, state senator representing a district in North Omaha; in Nebraska's history, the only African-American to have run for governor and the US Senate and longest-serving state senator.
