= Racial tension in Omaha, Nebraska =

Racial tension in Omaha, Nebraska occurred mostly because of the city's volatile mixture of high numbers of new immigrants from southern and eastern Europe and African-American migrants from the Deep South. While racial discrimination existed at several levels, the violent outbreaks were within working classes. Irish Americans, the largest and earliest immigrant group in the 19th century, established the first neighborhoods in South Omaha. All were attracted by new industrial jobs, and most were from rural areas. There was competition among ethnic Irish, newer European immigrants, and African-American migrants from the South, for industrial jobs and housing. They all had difficulty adjusting to industrial demands, which were unmitigated by organized labor in the early years. Some of the early labor organizing resulted in increasing tensions between groups, as later arrivals to the city were used as strikebreakers. In Omaha as in other major cities, racial tension has erupted at times of social and economic strife, often taking the form of mob violence as different groups tried to assert power. Much of the early violence came out of labor struggles in early 20th century industries: between working class ethnic whites and immigrants, and blacks of the Great Migration. Meatpacking companies had used the latter for strikebreakers in 1917 as workers were trying to organize. As veterans returned from World War I, both groups competed for jobs. By the late 1930s, however, interracial teams worked together to organize the meatpacking industry under the United Packinghouse Workers of America (UPWA). Unlike the AFL and some other industrial unions in the CIO, UPWA was progressive. It used its power to help end segregation in restaurants and stores in Omaha, and supported the civil rights movement in the 1960s. Women labor organizers such as Tillie Olsen and Rowena Moore were active in the meatpacking industry in the 1930s and 1940s, respectively.

Most violence and civil unrest in the 1960s, by contrast, arose out of poverty and problems caused by massive loss of working-class jobs through industrial restructuring. The city's African-American community suffered particularly and erupted in protest.

== 19th century ==
The Nebraska Territory was created in 1854 with the condition that the area stay slave-free. But, from 1855 on, there was debate in the Territorial Legislature about whether slavery should specifically be prohibited. As there were few slaves in the state, some legislators did not think the bill was needed. In 1859, the Daily Nebraskian newspaper reported its favoring of slavery, writing,

The bill introduced in [Omaha City] Council, for the abolition of slavery in this Territory, was called up yesterday, and its further consideration postponed for two weeks. A strong effort will be made among the Republicans to secure its passage; we think, however, it will fail. The farce certainly cannot be enacted if the Democrats do their duty.

During that period, some local newspapers openly editorialized against the presence of blacks in Omaha, for the Confederacy and against the election of Abraham Lincoln. The 1860 census showed that of the 81 Negroes in Nebraska, only 10 were slaves.

Because a clause in the original proposed Nebraska State Constitution limited voting rights in the state to "free white males", as had been common in many states, Nebraska was delayed about a year from entering the Union. In 1865, the Nebraska Territorial Legislature changed the proposed State Constitution to provide expanded suffrage. The territory gained statehood soon after.

Following the Civil War, enough blacks lived in Omaha to organize St. John's African Methodist Episcopal Church in 1867 as the first church for African Americans in Nebraska. The first recorded birth of an African American was that of William Leper, recorded in Omaha in 1872. In 1891, a mob lynched George Smith, an African American man, for allegedly raping a white woman. No one was charged in his murder.

== 20th century ==
In the early 20th century, social tensions of the rapidly industrializing city absorbing waves of new immigrants and migrants broke out in riots between ethnic minorities. The riots included extensive property damage and some deaths.

=== South Omaha ===
South Omaha was where many different immigrant groups established their own neighborhoods. These ranged from Sheelytown for ethnic Irish to Polish and Czech. Little Italy and Little Bohemia closely bordered South Omaha at its north boundary as well. The immigrants comprised most of the workers at the stockyards and meatpacking plants, also located there. They started organizing different laborers and stopped work with strikes. The industry responded by hiring workers from other parts of the country who were also seeking work: both European immigrants and black migrants from the South (whose numbers doubled in Omaha from 1910 to 1920). In 1905, more than 800 students (mostly children of immigrant workers) in South Omaha protested the presence of Japanese students at their school, calling them "scabs". The Japanese students were children of strikebreakers brought in by the Omaha Stockyards the previous summer during a fierce strike. Children of the regular workers refused to attend classes and locked teachers out of the building.

=== Greek Town Riot ===
Greek Town was a growing Greek immigrant community in South Omaha. Other immigrants resented the Greeks, who had come to the city as strikebreakers. Many men of the community had been jobless for an extensive period after they were laid off following the strikes. Some Omaha citizens assumed they were lazy rather than unemployed. In September 1909 a male resident of the Greek community was arrested by an ethnic Irish South Omaha policeman for allegedly having a relationship with a white woman. (He was taking English lessons from her.) The man took the officer's gun and shot him. After the Greek was captured a short while later, a mob of ethnic whites numbering about 1,000 arrived at the door of the jail. By then, the South Omaha policemen had transferred the man to the Omaha city jail. (The jurisdictions were then separate.) Frustrated, the mob turned to the Greek neighborhood and began to destroy it, threatening all of its residents with death if they stayed in town. Within a day, the Greek residents abandoned the six-by-six block area and scattered into cities across the Midwest. Meanwhile, the mob destroyed the entire neighborhood. The accused Greek immigrant was brought to trial; but, after intervention from the Greek ambassador to the U.S., who protested the government's failure to protect the immigrant community, the city of Omaha released the man and dropped charges against him.

=== Anti-German sentiments ===
In the immediate years after World War I and defeat of Germany by the Allies, anti-German sentiment ran high across the country. The Nebraska legislature passed a law in 1919 that enforced teaching in English in public schools. (Because of substantial immigration by Germans to Nebraska, in earlier years, studies in German were available in the public schools, along with French and classical languages.) By law, "No person, individually or as a teacher, shall, in any private, denominational, parochial or public school, teach any subject to any person in any language than the English language." Robert Meyer was found to violate this law because he taught German. He was taken to court by the State of Nebraska, and when found guilty he appealed. Although his appeal to the Nebraska Supreme Court failed, the U.S. Supreme Court in Meyer v. Nebraska determined that Meyer had the right to teach the German language as a subject, and to teach it in German. During the course of the year, open discrimination against Germans throughout Omaha was taking hold. Many German-language newspapers were forced to change to English, or to close.

=== Red Summer ===
In September 1919, following a summer of racial riots in several other industrial cities, an African-American laborer named Willy Brown was lynched in Omaha. He had been accused of raping a young white woman. A mob of 5,000 ethnic white men marched from South Omaha (some young men were classmates of the woman) and appeared at the Douglas County Courthouse to demand "justice". Within hours the mob grew to 10,000 people. Many were drinking. When the reform mayor Edward P. Smith attempted to intervene, he was nearly lynched by the mob. Only a last-minute rescue saved him from being hanged. The mob threw stones at windows, far outnumbered the police, and set the courthouse on fire to force the release of Brown. The police turned him over to save other prisoners. In a frenzy, the mob hung Brown from a lamppost and shot him, later dragged his body and burned it. The mob turned against police vehicles and attacked any blacks they found in the street. They began to move toward a large African-American enclave in North Omaha. The city and governor had called in the U.S. Army from Fort Omaha to intervene. It stationed troops in North Omaha to protect the blacks, and after gaining control of the mob, in South Omaha to prevent any more riots forming. An unseasonal rainstorm cooled the mob down as well. The Army commander established martial law for several days. A grand jury's investigation identified the mob as arising from South Omaha and being encouraged by the city's vice world. No one was charged in the events, however.

=== Anti-Black racism ===
On July 4, 1910, African American boxer Jack Johnson won a major upset at a national match in Reno, Nevada. Upon hearing the news, a dozen fights broke out in different areas of the city between whites and blacks, as happened in other cities. Whites wounded several black men and killed one.

After World War I, white veterans trying to return to their civilian jobs found African-Americans and Eastern European immigrants in their former positions. Their resentment led to several violent strikes in the South Omaha meat packing industry as groups tried to control access to jobs. During this period, Earl Little was a Baptist minister in North Omaha. After his son, Malcolm, was born in Omaha in 1925, the family moved away because of threats by the Ku Klux Klan in 1926. (The KKK had undergone a revival and growth in the Midwest in the early 1920s.) Malcolm Little later changed his last name to X, when he joined the Black Muslims, where he became an important leader known as Malcolm X.

In the 1920s, racial segregation became normalized in Omaha as redlining and restrictive covenants kept African Americans concentrated in housing in North Omaha. The riot had discredited the city's newly elected reformist government. In the next election, "Cowboy" Jim Dahlman was returned to office with the support of Tom Dennison, the informal leader of the vice world. The labor struggles and social struggles led Omaha's African-American leaders, such as Earl Little, Harry Haywood and George Wells Parker, to push harder for civil rights. After this period, African Americans in Omaha were largely concentrated as residents on the city's north side, with a small community in South Omaha.

== Civil rights era ==
In 1947, a student-led civil-rights group called the DePorres Club was forced off the Creighton University campus, where they started. Mildred Brown, a community activist and publisher, invited them to meet at the Omaha Star, the paper she directed for the African-American community for decades.

Omaha jazz legend Preston Love reported that in the 1950s he saw signs in Omaha restaurants and bars that said, "We Don't Serve Any Colored Race", but that he was always welcome as a musician. In the 1950s, the United Meatpacking Workers of America (UPWA) helped use their power to have businesses in Omaha integrate their facilities.

The late 1950s and early 1960s was the period which Lois Mark Stalvey wrote about in The Education of a WASP. She recounted her activist efforts to desegregate a middle-class West Omaha neighborhood for an African-American surgeon and his family who wanted to live in the area. Such efforts took place in a different environment from the struggles of most working-class families in North and South Omaha.

In 1955, the State of Nebraska took Omaha's main amusement park, Peony Park, to district court. The state believed that the park, founded in 1919, violated Nebraska Civil Rights Law when African American swimmers at the Amateur Athletic Union Swimming Meet held at the park on August 27, 1955 were discriminated against. In State of Nebraska v. Peony Park, the Nebraska Supreme Court found that two African-American participants were illegally barred from the meet because Peony Park barred them from the pool. On September 7, 1955, the court fined Peony Park $50 and costs of the trial. Additional civil suits were settled out of court. The Omaha Star newspaper reported extensively on the trial, using the opportunity to highlight segregationist policies around the city as well as the city's burgeoning civil rights movement.

By the early 1960s, economic progress by many African Americans and ethnic Americans became unraveled in the massive job losses caused by restructuring of railroad and meatpacking industries. By the mid-1960s, North Omaha had much more poverty than before and increasing social problems. On July 4, 1966, tensions broke out in a riot after a day of blistering 103 degree weather. Refusing a police order to disperse, African Americans demolished police cars and attacked the North 24th Street business corridor, throwing firebombs and demolishing storefronts. Businesses in the Near North Side suffered millions of dollars in damages. The riot lasted three days. The National Guard was called in to disperse the rioters. Less than a month later, on August 1, 1966, riots erupted after a 19-year-old was shot by a white off-duty policeman during a burglary. rioters firebombed three buildings and 180 riot police were required to quell the crowds. Leaders in the community criticized the Omaha World-Herald and local television stations for blaming African Americans for the conditions they faced in their deteriorating neighborhoods, when the problems of joblessness and decreased maintenance were beyond city and regional control. That same year, 1966, A Time for Burning, a documentary featuring North Omaha and the social problems, was filmed. Later, it was nominated for an Oscar for best documentary.

In March 1968, a crowd of high school and university students gathered at the Omaha Civic Auditorium to protest the presidential campaign of George Wallace, the segregationist governor of Alabama. After counter-protesters began acting violently toward the activists, police brutality led to dozens of protesters being injured. During the melee, an African-American youth was shot and killed by a police officer. Students' fleeing the outbreak attacked businesses and cars, causing thousands of dollars of damage.

The following day a local barber named Ernie Chambers helped calm a disturbance and prevent a riot by students at Horace Mann Junior High School. Chambers was already recognized as a community leader. After finishing his law degree, Chambers was elected to the Nebraska State Legislature. He went on to serve a total of 38 years, longer than any of his predecessors. Robert F. Kennedy visited Omaha later that year in his quest to become president, speaking in support of Omaha's civil rights activists.

An African-American teenager named Vivian Strong was shot and killed by police officers in an incident at the Logan Fontenelle Housing Projects in June 1969. Young African Americans in the area rioted after the teenager's death, and looted along the North 24th Street business corridor. Eight businesses were destroyed by firebombing or looting. Events went on for several more days. This is the last noted riot in Omaha.

In 1970, an African-American man named Duane Peak was arrested, and quickly implicated six others in a bombing at a vacant house in North Omaha that killed a police officer. On August 31, local Black Panther Party leaders David Rice and Ed Poindexter were arrested in the case, despite not having been originally implicated. In 1971, both men were convicted of murder in the controversial Rice/Poindexter Case, and in 1974 a retrial of Rice and Poindexter was denied by the Nebraska State Supreme Court.

=== Late 20th century ===
The 1970s construction of the North Freeway bisected North Omaha, effectively cutting the African-American community in half and creating social problems. In 1976, the Omaha Public Schools began court-ordered busing to achieve integration.

In 1981, arsonists burned an East Omaha duplex after an African-American family signed a rental agreement there. The arson is unsolved.

In 1993, the Nebraska Parole Board voted for the first time to unanimously commute the sentences of Rice and Poindexter to time served. The Nebraska Board of Pardons refused to schedule a hearing in the matter. This same sequence of events has occurred no fewer than three times since then, with the same outcome each time.

In 1995, an African-American gang member murdered an Omaha police officer named Jimmy Wilson, Jr. The city responded by equipping every police car with a camera and giving North Omaha officers body armor. Later that year, arsonists tipped over and burned an African-American woman's car in East Omaha near the site of the 1981 arson. Both cases are unsolved.

In 1996, the Omaha public schools ended court-ordered busing. That same year, the Omaha World-Herald reported that, "One resident of Rose Garden Estates near 172nd and Pacific Streets said privately, for instance, that he finds the prospect of being incorporated into the city 'increasingly scary.' 'I left Benson because I didn't like the changes,' he said. 'Too much crime, too much racial tension, too much school busing. I went to the suburbs to get away from that, and now I'm being forced back in.' The man, an insurance company employee, denied that his problems were based on race, but he asked that this part of the interview be anonymous."

In 1997, an African-American Gulf War veteran named Marvin Ammons was shot and killed by an Omaha police officer. A grand jury indicts the officer for manslaughter, then the judgment was thrown out for jury misconduct. A second grand jury acquitted the officer of wrongdoing and admonished the Omaha Police Department for mishandling the case.

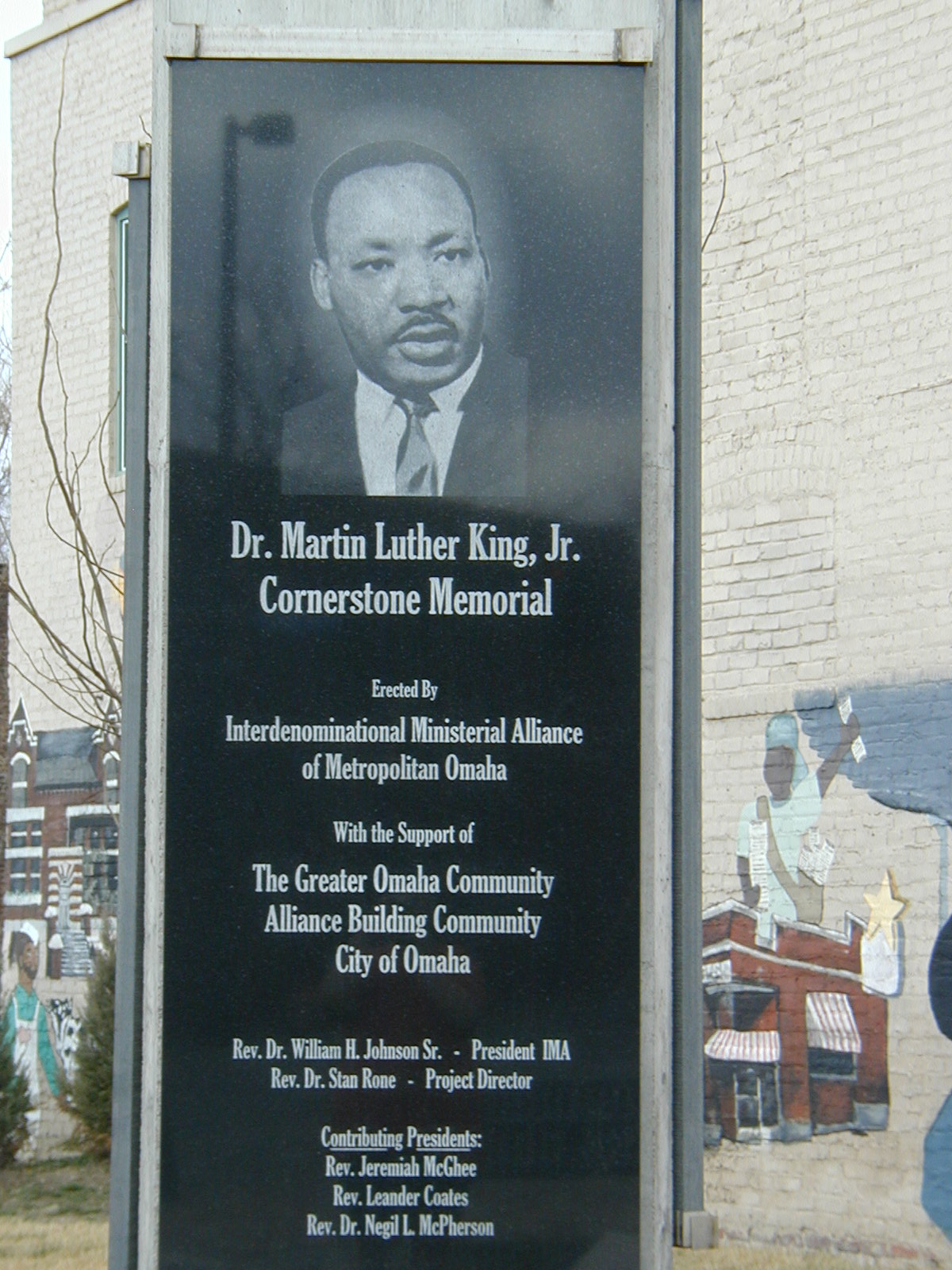
Dr. Martin Luther King Jr. Cornerstone Memorial at the NW corner of 24th & Lake St in North Omaha.

In 2000, George Bibins, an African American who leads Omaha police on a high speed chase, is shot and killed by officer Jared Kruse at the end of the chase. Charges are filed against the officer, but special prosecutors force them to be presented to a grand jury which declines to recommend charges. The Omaha Police Department does not make a decision on the use of force because Jared Kruse refused to be questioned and is allowed to retire a year later for PTSD. A second jury in the civil case refuses to award damages to Bibins' family.

That year, the Nebraska State Legislature enacted term limits. Some used this action to target long-time State Senator Ernie Chambers, an African American who had then served 27 years representing North Omaha. In 2005, Chambers became the longest-serving State Senator in Nebraska history, with more than 32 years of service. Because of the 2002 law, Chambers was not allowed to immediately run for reelection when his term expired in 2009, so he waited until 2013 and ran again. He was reelected consistently until term limits again prevented him from running again in 2021. In total, Ernie Chambers represented North Omaha in the Legislature for 46 years.

Desegregation busing and racial integration in public schools were contentious issues in Omaha. Problems with public schools were a factor in middle-class people moving to the suburbs, but the shift in population to suburbs also followed the growth of the city and highways. Omahans' preference for larger, newer housing was just like that of other Americans. Middle-class African Americans have also moved to the suburbs here and in other cities.

=== Schooling ===
From 1976 to 1999, Omaha had a busing plan as an effort to integrate the schools. Busing was an early goal of civil rights leaders and groups in Omaha, including 4CL, who lauded integrated busing as a particularly important step in improving race relations. When the city considered ending busing in the 1990s, Concerned and Caring Educators, a 100-member group of black education administrators and supervisors, praised the system as having improved race relations and the education of Omaha's students.

Omaha Public Schools ended busing to achieve integration in 1999. It responded to parental desires for neighborhood schools and for choice. It has created magnet schools to attract students from middle-class families. As in many other cities, concerns about schools are high. Like some other districts such as Louisville, Kentucky, Omaha has begun to explore socioeconomic integration - assigning students according to family income - to change the makeup of their schools and address low test scores among poor children in the inner city. There have been delays in efforts to unite the Omaha public school district with newly annexed smaller, local districts in the western half of the city.

== 21st century ==
Senator Ernie Chambers proposed a controversial school separation plan for Omaha in the Nebraska State Legislature in response to concerns by suburban districts outside Omaha boundaries. The state legislature was interested in seeking a way to use suburban districts to help integrate the city's schools. "The law, intended to resolve a boundary dispute between the Omaha schools and largely white suburban districts, created a learning community of area school districts that would operate with a common tax levy and required them to draw up an integration plan for metropolitan Omaha."

Chambers lobbied to create three districts in the city, with each drawn along geographic boundaries that loosely correlated to the racial segregation of the city: African Americans in North Omaha, Hispanic/Latinos in South Omaha, and Caucasians in West Omaha. Chambers defended his decision from the standpoint that much of the city had residential segregation and that his plan would provide African American parents in North Omaha with more control over their district. The State Legislature signed this plan into law in April, 2006, with the plan going into effect in 2008.

Within a month of the legislature's passing the law, the National Association for the Advancement of Colored People brought a lawsuit, arguing that due to Omaha's racially segregated residential patterns, subdivided school districts will also be racially segregated, contrary to United States law. The case has also drawn national attention. Critics regard the plan as "state-sponsored segregation".

In February 2007, unknown assailants robbed, firebombed, and spray painted a racist epithet on the side of an East Omaha grocery store owned by an Ethiopian immigrant. That crime is unsolved.

In October 2007, the Omaha World-Herald noted recent census statistics showed that Omaha, the 43rd largest city in the United States, has the fifth highest poverty rate for African Americans among the 100 largest cities. More than one in three live below the poverty line. The city has plans for public-private development in North Omaha that are intended to revive the area. Investment in infrastructure, parks and street design has already begun.

Some groups have tried to gain political power by opposing immigrants, but more people in the city and community have rallied in support of immigrants, including the Latino community, who comprise the most numerous recent immigrants. In 2007, a neo-Nazi group tried to organize a protest and had 65 participants outside the city's Mexican consulate. They were far outnumbered by the thousands in counter-protests, as well as those celebrating at events marking the diversity of the city.

In May and June 2020, thousands of demonstrators filled Omaha streets to protest the murder of George Floyd by police in Minneapolis and other killings marked by the Black Lives Matter movement. Police injured demonstrators with tear gas and projectiles, in at least one case shooting a bystander in the face, blinding him. A white bar owner in the Old Market, Jacob Gardner, shot and killed unarmed Black protester James Scurlock. County Attorney Don Kleine declined to press charges against Gardner, which lead to more protests. In July 2020, police conducted a mass arrest of 120 peaceful protesters on a highway overpass. Despite Kleine's refusal to press charges, on September 15, a Special Prosecutor, Frederick Franklin, pressed charges against Gardner. Gardner was formally charged with four felonies, including manslaughter. On September 20, while in Oregon, Gardner committed suicide, reportedly near a medical clinic.

== Related publications ==
- Fletcher Sasse, Adam (2016) North Omaha History: Volume 1. Olympia, WA: CommonAction Publishing.
- Fletcher Sasse, Adam (2016) North Omaha History: Volume 2. Olympia, WA: CommonAction Publishing.
- Fletcher Sasse, Adam (2016) North Omaha History: Volume 3. Olympia, WA: CommonAction Publishing.

== See also ==
- History of North Omaha, Nebraska
- Timeline of North Omaha, Nebraska history
- History of Omaha, Nebraska
- History of slavery in Nebraska
- Timeline of racial tension in Omaha, Nebraska
