= Omaha Star building =

- U.S. National Register of Historic Places
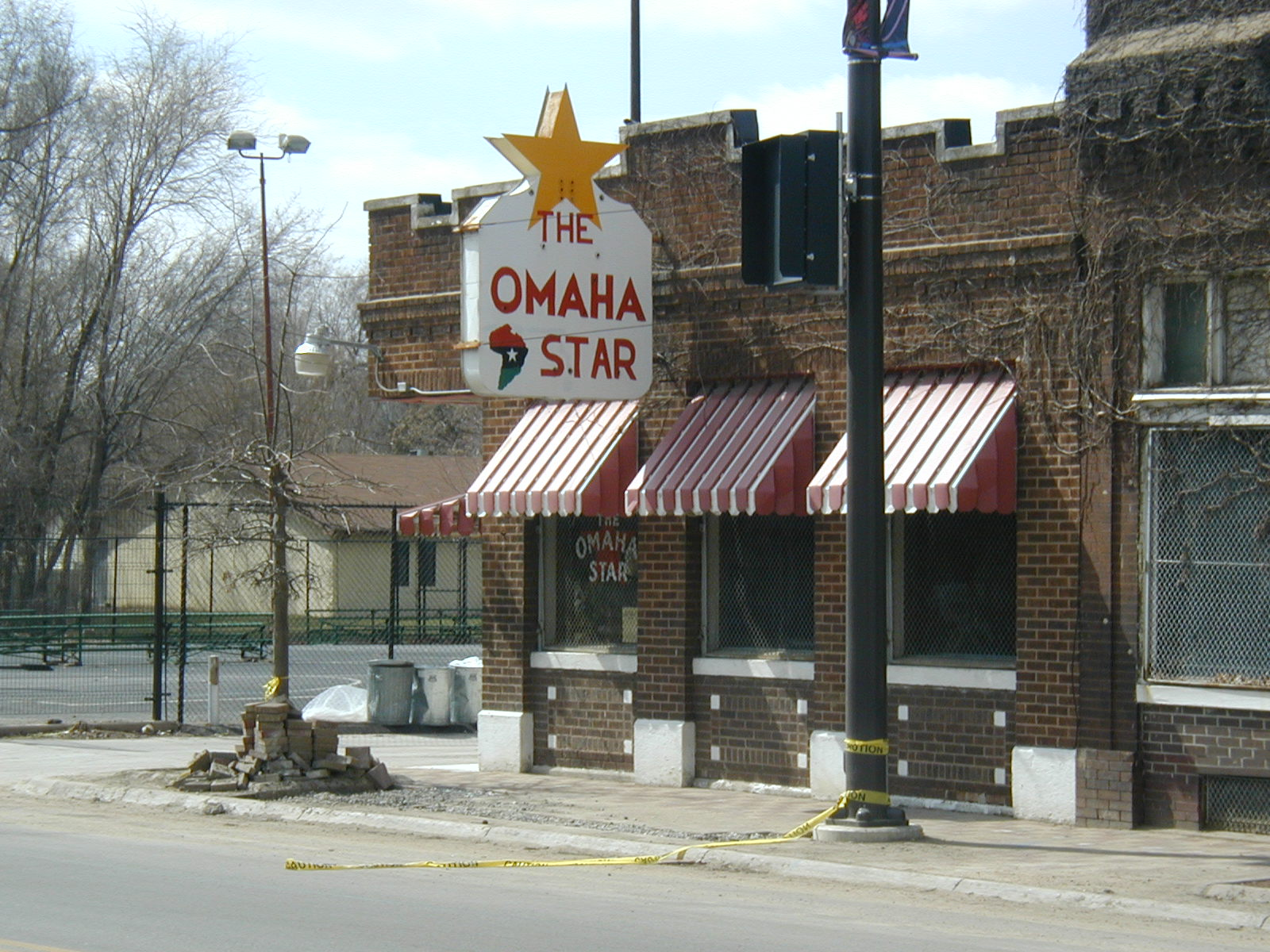
- The Omaha Star building

- Location within Nebraska Location within the United States
- Location: North Omaha, Nebraska
- Coordinates: 41°16′47″N 95°56′49″W
- Built: 1923
- Architect: G.P. Prinz
- Architectural style: Early Commercial
- NRHP reference No.: 07001322
- Added to NRHP: December 27, 2007

The Omaha Star building is located at 2216 North 24th Street in North Omaha, Nebraska. As the site of publication of The Omaha Star newspaper since 1938, the building is notable for its long service to Omaha's African-American community and its connections to the civil rights movement in the city. In recognition of its significance, the building was listed on the National Register of Historic Places in 2007.

== History ==
Through the Great Migration decades, the Near North Side of Omaha was the center of the city's African-American community when Mildred Brown and her husband Edward S. Gilbert founded the Omaha Star in 1938. The building, built in 1923, originally housed a mortuary and then a social hall. Brown lived in an apartment at the back of the building from the founding of the paper through 1989 when she died. (She and her husband divorced in the 1940s.)

Since 1945, the Omaha Star has been the only African-American paper in Omaha. In the 1940s, the building provided a home for the DePorres Club, an important civil rights organization in Omaha. Brown invited the DePorres Club, a youth-led activism organization, to use her offices after the group was exiled from nearby Creighton University.

Brown ensured that the Omaha Star kept the community apprised of national issues, especially the civil rights movement's successes and failures across the country and throughout the city. Journalists researched the issues and presented the facts to its readers, and then urged involvement, but it also provided a voice and a face for the community in general.

In 2007, the City of Omaha unanimously approved a community development block grant to fund a $40,000 renovation for the building. During the renovation, the building's hallmark 1940s sign was temporarily taken down for refurbishing. The sign features the newspaper's name, a map of Africa and a large star that lights up at night.

Dr. Marguerita Washington, Mildred Brown's niece, ran the paper from her aunt's death in 1989 until her own death in 2016. Speaking of the NRHP designation, Dr. Washington said, "I wanted it in recognition for my aunt because of all that hard work she did in the community." The building is owned by the Mildred D. Brown Memorial Study Center, which also currently owns The Omaha Star as well.

The city dedicated the Mildred Brown Memorial Strolling Park in May 2008 next to the Omaha Star Building. Constructed as a service learning project by students from the Metropolitan Community College, the park includes walkways and planting beds.

== See also ==
- History of North Omaha, Nebraska
