= Black Association for Nationalism Through Unity =

The Black Association for Nationalism Through Unity, or BANTU, was a youth activism group focused on black power and nationalism in Omaha, Nebraska in the 1960s. Its name is a reference to the Bantu peoples of Southern Africa.

It was reportedly an arm of the Black Panthers Party. Efforts by some to start a chapter at Tech High School were unsuccessful. According to extensive U.S. government surveillance records, Robert Griffo, a member of the Black Panthers, was appointed minister of student affairs at Tech. BANTU was credited with leading the protests that led to three days of rioting in June 1969, after an Omaha police officer fatally shot teenager Vivian Strong in the Logan Fontenelle Public Housing Projects.

BANTU was also the target of a COINTELPRO investigation by the FBI.

== See also ==
- List of riots and civil unrest in Omaha, Nebraska
- African Americans in Omaha, Nebraska

== Bibliography ==
- Howard, A. M. (2006, Sep) The Omaha Black Panther Party and BANTU: Exploitation or a Relationship of Mutual Convenience Paper presented at the annual meeting of the Association for the Study of African American Life and History, NA, Atlanta, GA
