= Omaha Coalition of Citizen Patrols =

Omaha Coalition of Citizen Patrols (OCCP) is a group of volunteer unarmed patrollers in Omaha, Nebraska, United States.

It was founded in 2005 and comprises 36 neighborhood patrol and watch groups such as Home Park Citizen Patrol. Last year alone there were about 1,000 volunteers who donated nearly 20,000 hours of their time to the City of Omaha to make it a safer place. Omaha Citizen Patrols were started as a response to increased criminal activity in a given area or neighborhood.

Citizen Patrollers make a visible presence by driving through the local area usually at night or on the weekends to send a clear message that illegal activity will not be tolerated. All patrollers are trained by the Omaha Police Department which includes a four-hour class. The OCCP has extra patrols on Halloween, and has more than 300 members currently.
