= Operation Blue Storm =

American anti-drug operation

- Part of the Mexican drug war
Date	2012
Location	Arizona, Nebraska
Result	Successful operation, illegal marijuana smuggling ring dismantled.

Belligerents
United States	Sinaloa Cartel; South Family Bloods

Operation Blue Storm was a successful police investigation of an illegal marijuana smuggling ring operating in Arizona and Nebraska. During a lengthy investigation in 2012, police investigators uncovered links between the South Family Bloods street gang of Omaha, Nebraska, and the Sinaloa Cartel of northwestern Mexico, which was supplying South Family with illegal marijuana smuggled into and out of Arizona. The Nebraska investigation resulted in the indictment and conviction of 15 individuals, and the seizure of $60,000 in property, while the investigation in Arizona resulted in the indictment of 11 others, who, according to police, were directly linked to the Sinaloa Cartel. Police officials also announced that the illegal marijuana ring was responsible for smuggling 16,000 pounds of product into the United States, with a street value of approximately $7.75 million.

On May 13, 2013, the United States Attorney's office released an assessment of Operation Blue Storm, and credited it as the "most outstanding regional drug trafficking case" of 2012. Six police officers and one civilian were honored with a national ceremony on May 7, 2013, including Officer Dennis O'Connor, Sergeant John Brazda, Officer Shawn McAlpin, Officer Zeb Simmones, Officer John Stuck and Officer R.J. Radik (retired).

During the ceremony, U.S. Attorney Deborah Gilg made the following statement:

"The outstanding work done by this collaboration of federal, state and local law enforcement agencies disrupted a major tentacle of the Sinaloa Mexican Cartel to the Midwestern region.... This demonstrates law enforcement teamwork at its best."

The following police agencies participated in Operation Blue Storm: Bellevue Police Department (Nebraska), Omaha Police Department (Nebraska), Peoria Police Department (Arizona) and the Federal Bureau of Investigation (FBI).

== See also ==
- Mexican drug war
