= Timeline of North Omaha, Nebraska history =

Significant events in the history of North Omaha, Nebraska include the Pawnee, Otoe and Sioux nations; the African American community; Irish, Czech, and other European immigrants, and; several other populations. Several important settlements and towns were built in the area, as well as important social events that shaped the future of Omaha and the history of the nation. The timeline of North Omaha history extends to present, including recent controversy over schools.

== Historical timeline ==
=== Pre-1850 ===
- Pre-19th century Bands from the Pawnee, Otoe and Sioux nations alternatively occupy the land now comprising North Omaha as hunting area
- Early 19th century Omaha nation uses the land now comprising North Omaha as hunting area
- 1804 Between August 3 and August 20, the Lewis and Clark Expedition traveled along the banks of the Missouri and camped in North Omaha near Dodge Park. There is speculation that Clark traveled in the area, possibly to the Belvedere Point Lookout.
- 1812 Manuel Lisa builds Fort Lisa north of Omaha and helps sway local tribes to support the US in the War of 1812.
- 1819 The first steamboat to ply Nebraskan waters, the Western Engineer, arrives at Fort Lisa.
- 1824 Cabanne's Trading Post established in far North Omaha for the American Fur Company owned by John Jacob Astor.
- 1846 Winter Quarters established in present-day Florence as a hold-over of the Church of Jesus Christ of Latter-day Saints on their way from Nauvoo to Utah. 359 died and are buried in what is now called the Mormon Pioneer Cemetery. This area was the first city in the Nebraska Territory, called Culter's Park by its 2500 residents. Although it only existed for two years, the city had a mayor and city council, 24 policemen and fireguards, various administrative committees, and a town square for public meetings.

=== 1851-1900 ===
- 1855 Florence makes a bid to become the Nebraska State Capitol, but loses to Omaha.
- 1855 Scriptown is platted for legislators in the Nebraska Territorial Legislature.
- 1856 The town of Saratoga is founded within today's North Omaha.
- 1856 Prospect Hill Cemetery was set out in a plat by Moses F. Shinn.
- 1856 East Omaha is annexed to Omaha.
- 1863 Brownell Hall is founded at the location of present-day North 24th and Grand Streets.
- 1863 The Storz Brewery is founded along North 16th Street.
- 1865 The oldest African American congregation in Nebraska, St. John's African Methodist Episcopal Church, is founded in North Omaha.
- 1868 Nebraska's first high school graduates come from Brownell Hall in North Omaha.
- 1868 The Sherman Barracks are built in the location of present-day North Omaha.
- 1875 A farmhouse is built along present-day North 24th Street that is eventually expanded into the Redick Mansion.
- 1875 Purchased by the Omaha Driving Park Association, the Omaha Driving Park was the original site of the Douglas County Fair starting in 1858.
- 1877 The Saratoga Bend is "cut off" from the Missouri River by a flood, forming what originally called Cutoff Lake. Vacation cabins on the east side of the lake eventually become the town of Carter Lake, Iowa.
- 1878 The Sherman Barracks are renamed Fort Omaha by the US government.
- 1879 General Crook House completed at Fort Omaha.
- 1879 The first acknowledgment of Native Americans' human rights by the US Government occurs during the trial of Standing Bear v. Crook.
- 1883 Buffalo Bill founds the Wild West, Rocky Mountain and Prairie Exhibition in North Omaha.
- 1883 The Kountze Place neighborhood was formed.
- 1883 Holy Family Catholic Church is built at the intersections of 18th and Izard Streets.
- 1887 Saratoga was annexed into Omaha.
- 1887 The area that became the Bemis Park neighborhood was annexed into Omaha.
- 1887 The Kountze Place neighborhood is annexed into Omaha.
- 1887 The John P. Bay House is built at North 20th and Binney Streets.
- 1889 The Orchard Hill neighborhood is established.
- 1889 The Bemis Park neighborhood is platted.
- 1889 The new Gold Coast neighborhood is platted.
- 1889 Kountze Park is accepted as a gift from Augustus Kountze to the City of Omaha.
- 1890 Cutoff Lake was renamed Carter Lake and the city of Omaha formed Levi Carter Park.
- 1891 African American George Smith lynched in North Omaha for "leering at a white woman."
- 1891 The Omaha Presbyterian Theological Seminary is founded at 3303 North 21st Place.
- 1892 Dr. Matthew Ricketts, a physician in North Omaha, is the first African American man elected to the Nebraska State Legislature.
- 1897 Future political writer and activist George Wells Parker begins attending Creighton University, later rallying African Americans in the Hamitic League of the World.
- 1897 The Sherman, one of the first apartment buildings in Omaha, is completed along North 16th Street.
- 1898 The Trans-Mississippi Exposition was held in north Omaha from June 1 to October 31, 1898. Its ornate grounds were created to highlight the economic, cultural and artistic achievements of the individuals who lived in the Midwest. All of the buildings, which housed over 5000 exhibits, were built as temporary structures. Today there is a monument in North Omaha's Kountze Park, the former site of the exposition.
- 1898 Protesters in the Walnut Hill suburb of North Omaha take over several streetcars in their neighborhood to protest poor public transportation conditions.
- 1899 The Greater America Exposition held on the same site with many of the same features at the Trans-Mississippi Exposition.

=== 1901-1950 ===
- 1902 The Sacred Heart Catholic Church is completed at 22nd and Binney Streets.
- 1903 Dr. Ricketts leaves Omaha, and Jack Broomfield, owner of a notorious saloon in downtown Omaha, becomes the de facto political leader of Omaha's African American community.
- 1903 The George F. Shepard House is completed at North 18th and Wirt Streets.
- 1904 The George H. Kelly House is completed at North 19th and Binney Streets.
- 1907 The Webster Telephone Exchange Building is built by the Nebraska Telephone Company at 22nd and Lake Streets.
- 1908 The US Army Signal Corps is established at the Fort Omaha Balloon School.
- 1908 Omaha University is founded in the Redick Mansion at North 24th and Pratt Streets.
- 1909 The Charles Storz House is built at North 19th and Wirt Streets.
- 1910 Gifford Park is platted.
- 1910 Boxer Jack Johnson wins an upset title match in Reno, Nevada, setting off riots across the U.S. In Omaha white mobs prowl North Omaha looking for blacks to victimize, wounding several and killing one.
- 1910 North Presbyterian Church is built along North 24th Street.
- 1910 The Lizzie Robinson House is built at 28th and Corby Streets.
- 1912 Local chapter of NAACP founded.
- 1913 The Zion Baptist Church, designed by future master architect Clarence W. Wigington, is completed.
- 1913 Renowned Jewish author Tillie Olsen moves to North Omaha's Jewish community as a young child.
- 1913 Easter Sunday tornado kills dozens and destroys countless blocks of North Omaha.
- 1913 Bandleader and vocalist Anna Mae Winburn is born in North Omaha.
- 1913 The George F. Shepard House is completed at North 18th and Wirt Streets.
- 1913 Clarence Wigington's award-winning design for the Broomfield Rowhouse is completed at North 25th and Lake Streets.
- 1914 Noted Harlem Renaissance writer Wallace Thurman completes grammar school in North Omaha.
- 1915 The Lincoln Motion Picture Company was founded in North Omaha to produce black films.
- 1917 Florence is annexed by the City of Omaha.
- 1917 Redick Mansion is demolished.
- 1919 Rioters lynch Will Brown and pillage North Omaha during the Omaha Race Riot of 1919.
- 1919 The first African American pilot from North Omaha, future Tuskegee Airman Alfonza W. Davis, is born in North Omaha.
- 1920s First wave of white flight from near North Omaha following the riots, with whites leaving the area en masse from Cuming north to Kountze.
- 1920s Earl Little founded Omaha chapter of Universal Negro Improvement Association and African Communities League.
- 1921 Noted songwriter, bandleader and saxophonist Preston Love is born in Omaha.
- 1923 The third high school in Omaha, Technical High School, is opened.
- 1923 The Jewell Building is completed.
- 1925 Malcolm X born in North Omaha.
- 1927 Omaha chapter of the Urban League is formed.
- 1929 The Harry Buford House, later listed on the National Register of Historic Places, is completed along North 30th Street.
- 1930s Midwestern territorial band Cotton Club Boys are formed in North Omaha.
- 1930s Renowned bandleader Red Perkins moves to North Omaha.
- 1934 Renowned bandleader Nat Towles takes up residence in North Omaha.
- 1938 The Logan Fontenelle Housing Project is built at 20th and Paul Streets.
- 1938 Omaha University moves from North Omaha.
- 1938 The Omaha Star, the only African American newspaper in Nebraska, is founded at 2216 North 24th Street.
- 1943 The Omaha Presbyterian Theological Seminary was permanently closed.
- 1947 DePorres Club starts campaign for nonviolent social change against racial discrimination in North Omaha.
- 1947 Future business leader Cathy Hughes is born to Helen Jones Woods.
- 1950 Whitney Young becomes the president of the Urban League in North Omaha.

=== 1951-2000 ===
- 1954 The North Presbyterian Church is racially integrated and renamed Calvin Memorial Presbyterian Church.
- 1958 Rev. Dr. Martin Luther King Jr. visits North Omaha.
- 1961 Trumpeter and big band leader Lloyd Hunter died in North Omaha.
- 1960s Second wave of white flight from further North Omaha as whites begin to leave the area en masse from Kountze to Miller Park.
- 1962 Community leader Bertha Calloway founded the Negro Historical Society.
- 1966 The documentary A Time for Burning is released and nominated for an Academy Award.
- 1966 On July 5 the National Guard is called to quell two days of rioting among African Americans in North Omaha.
- 1968 Riots erupt in North Omaha in response to assassination of Martin Luther King Jr.
- 1968 Robert F. Kennedy visits Omaha in his quest to become president.
- 1969 Riots erupt on June 24 after an Omaha police officer fatally shoots teenager Vivian Strong in the Logan Fontenelle Housing Projects.
- 1970 On August 17 a bombing occurs at a house at 2867 Ohio Street, killing one policeman. Black Panther members are implicated, leading to the Rice/Poindexter Case.
- 1970s The North Omaha Freeway is constructed, thereby splitting North Omaha in half with severe negative impacts on the community.
- 1972 The Storz Brewery closes permanently.
- 1976 Native Omaha Days is celebrated for the first time.
- 1976 Bertha Calloway opens the Great Plains Black History Museum in the Webster Telephone Exchange Building.
- 1990s Third wave of "white flight" from far North Omaha as whites move en masse from Redick north to Craig Street, the informal dividing line between North Omaha and Florence.

=== 2000-present ===
- 2004 Preston Love died in North Omaha.
- 2006 Senator Ernie Chambers forwards a bill through the Nebraska State Legislature to divide Omaha Public Schools along racial lines.
- 2009 Senator Chambers is forced out of office due to a term limits law created to stop him from serving beyond his 38 years in the Nebraska Legislature. He was the longest-serving state senator in the history of Nebraska.

== Related publications ==
- Fletcher Sasse, Adam (2016) North Omaha History: Volume 1. Olympia, WA: CommonAction Publishing.
- Fletcher Sasse, Adam (2016) North Omaha History: Volume 2. Olympia, WA: CommonAction Publishing.
- Fletcher Sasse, Adam (2016) North Omaha History: Volume 3. Olympia, WA: CommonAction Publishing.

== See also ==
- North Omaha, Nebraska
- History of North Omaha, Nebraska
- Landmarks in North Omaha, Nebraska
- Timeline of Racial Tension in Omaha, Nebraska
