= Civil rights movement in Omaha, Nebraska =

The civil rights movement in Omaha, Nebraska, has roots that extend back until at least 1912. With a history of racial tension that starts before the founding of the city, Omaha has been the home of numerous overt efforts related to securing civil rights for African Americans since at least the 1870s.

== Background ==
Prior to the formal founding of the civil rights movement in Omaha, several African Americans secured status that was relevant to later struggles. While the civil rights movement proper did not begin until the 1940s, the historical significance of Omaha in securing civil rights for a variety of American people could be said to start in 1876.

That year stands out in the civil rights movement as Omaha became the location of the pivotal 1876 trial of Standing Bear v. Crook. In that trial a U.S. district court judge at Fort Omaha set U.S. legal precedent by recognising the personhood of Native Americans, thereby granting American Indians the rights of citizens. With Standing Bear, a Ponca chief on trial, local journalist Thomas Tibbles, Omaha Susette LaFlesche and General Crook himself testified on behalf of acknowledging Native American rights. For the first time, a U.S. court had ruled that an Indian was, officially, a person. Standing Bear won the case, securing the right of his tribe to leave their Indian Territory reservation and return to their Nebraska homelands.

The first record of community violence against Blacks in Omaha occurred in 1891, when an African-American man called Joe Coe was lynched by a vigilante mob for allegedly raping a white girl. Another lynching occurred in 1919 when a white mob stormed the Douglas County Courthouse to take Willy Brown, an African American accused of raping a young white woman. While these incidents terrified the population of African Americans in the community and effectively segregated them from the rest of the city, the civil rights movement in Omaha did not gain large-scale momentum until the 1920s.

== Early years ==
With early 20th century growth in the number of African-American migrants recruited by the meatpacking industry, the population doubled from 1910 to 1920. Some groups in the city resisted such changes. Some public places discriminated against African Americans, although segregation was not legal. Up to the 1940s and 1950s, many of the city's restaurants were effectively segregated, with signs that stated, "We Don't Serve Any Colored Race."

An early organized effort for civil rights in Omaha was the creation of the local chapter of the National Association for the Advancement of Colored People (NAACP) in 1912, Episcopal minister, Father John Albert Williams playing the role of first president. At the national level, leadership and membership were integrated. The chapter has continued.

Other civil rights organizations soon formed in Omaha, part of the early 20th century spirit of reform that generated many progressive groups. In 1917, George Wells Parker founded the Hamitic League of the World in Omaha. In 1918 the League published his pamphlet Children of the Sun. The Hamitic League was committed to Black nationalism. Based in New York, Cyril Briggs became editor of their journal, The Crusader. It later became the journal of the African Blood Brotherhood (ABB).

In the 1920s, the Baptist minister Earl Little founded the Omaha chapter of Marcus Garvey's Universal Negro Improvement Association. Little was the father of Malcolm, who later named himself Malcolm X when he became a Black Muslim minister and spokesman for the Nation of Islam. Malcolm X was born in Omaha in 1925, but his family moved away from the city while he was young.

There are reports of African Blood Brotherhood-related action in Omaha, particularly around the time of the Willy Brown lynching. Witnessing the mob rule that overtook the city at the time of the lynching horrified many people. One of those who was radicalized was Harry Haywood, who went on to become involved with the African Blood Brotherhood. Later Haywood became a leading African-American member of the Communist Party of the United States. He was active from the 1920s to his death in 1981.

In 1927, the first chapter in the American West of the Urban League was founded in Omaha. The chapter was organized at a meeting of white and Black citizens at the Y.M.C.A. and its purpose was "the social and economic betterment of Negro residents and improved relationship between races." The Omaha Urban League (now the Urban League of Nebraska) has been led by many prominent African Americans, including Whitney M. Young Jr. and Thomas H. Warren Sr. Young quickly tripled the membership of the chapter during his tenure in the 1950s and would eventually lead the National Urban League during the civil rights movement. Warren previously served as the first African-American chief of police for the City of Omaha. The Urban League of Nebraska continues today.

During this period, the National Federation of Colored Women had five chapters in North Omaha with more than 750 members. They actively conducted a variety of social, political and charitable work throughout the city of Omaha. Starting in 1920, the Colored Commercial Club organized to help Blacks in Omaha secure employment and to encourage business enterprises among African Americans.

The South Omaha Stockyards employed a large portion of the city's African-American workers from the South. Working conditions there were often brutal. These workers made significant gains after organizing with the Industrial Workers of the World in the 1920s. During the Depression of the 1930s, however, they suffered setbacks when major packinghouses closed.

In the 1930s, a clandestine group called the Knights and Daughters of Tabor was founded in Omaha. Also known as the "Knights of Liberty", it was a secret African-American organization whose goal was "nothing less than the destruction of slavery."

In 1938, Mildred Brown founded The Omaha Star. Starting with a circulation of 6,000, it quickly became the city's only African-American newspaper, featuring positive news, role models and activities throughout the community. The paper strongly supported the local civil rights movement, for which it often featured successes and highlighted the challenges facing Blacks in Omaha. The Star reported proudly on the career of Captain Alfonza W. Davis, who fought with the Tuskegee Airmen during World War II. He was presumed Killed In Action when his aircraft disappeared over Germany in 1944.

=== Political representation ===
Matthew Oliver Ricketts, elected from Omaha in 1892, was Nebraska's first African-American state legislator, but no other Black state legislator was elected until 1926. In August 1906, Black members of the Omaha community formed a group called the "Progressive League of Douglas County", Williams president, to pressure the county Republicans to include Blacks on the legislative ticket, in particular Millard F. Singleton. Eventually, North Omaha sent a succession of African Americans to the State Legislature between the 1920s and WWII, starting with John Andrew Singleton and Ferdinand L. Barnett in 1926, Dr. Aaron Manasses McMillan (elected in 1928) and followed by Johnny Owen. In the first Unicameral in 1937 John Adams Jr was elected (he served from 1935 to 1941) and was followed by his father, John Adams Sr, (served from 1949 until his death in 1962). Adams Sr was a noted minister of the African Methodist Episcopal Church. John A Singleton, John Adams Jr, John O. Wood, Andrew Stuart, and Harry Anderson formed the Consolidated Negro Political Organization in March 1933 in an effort to organize Black political activity in Omaha. Adams Jr was a lawyer who frequently was involved in Civil Rights cases and, as a legislator, introduced the state's first public housing law and supported other welfare legislation.

== 1947–1962 ==
In 1947, a group of students developed the DePorres Club. Founded at Creighton University, this club included African-American high school students and white Creighton University students who actively sought to fight racial discrimination in housing and the workplace.

In the 1950s, the offices of the Omaha Star hosted the DePorres Club after Creighton banned them from campus. The club hosted a community center called the Omaha DePorres Center to meet the needs of low-income families. It eventually started branches in Denver and Kansas City. According to one historian, "Their goals and tactics foreshadowed the efforts of civil rights activists throughout the nation in the 1960s."

One of the early efforts led by the DePorres Club was the 1952–54 Omaha Bus Boycott. Mildred Brown, a leader of the boycott, extolled readers of the Omaha Star to "Don't ride Omaha's buses or streetcars. If you must ride, protest by using 18 pennies." Focusing on ending the Omaha and Council Bluffs Street Railway Company's policy of not hiring Black drivers, the boycott was successful.

In 1958, a group of African-American educators in Omaha Public Schools started a professional caucus called Concerned and Caring Educators that continues to this day. Dr. Martin Luther King Jr. preached at Salem Baptist Church in North Omaha late that same year.

== 1963–1971 ==
During the 1960s, community activists liked to gather at North Omaha neighborhood locations, including the Fair Deal Cafe on North 24th Street and Goodwin's Spencer Street Barbershop at 3116 N. 24th Street, where young Ernie Chambers was a barber. Other notable activists important to Omaha's African-American community during this period included Rowena Moore, Lois Mark Stalvey, and Bertha Calloway.

In 1963, a group of African-American ministers from North Omaha formed a group called the "Citizens Civic Committee for Civil Liberties", or 4CL. The group rallied throughout the city to demand civil rights for all African Americans through picketing, stand-ins during city council meetings and other efforts. They set forth the formal agenda for Omaha's civil rights movement, with three main goals to be achieved through state legislation: to ensure equal housing opportunities and equal job opportunities for African Americans, and to secure integrated schools through busing for all African-American students. That year local youth activists were successful in bringing down the color barrier at Peony Park, the city's main amusement park, after protesting at the admission gates for several weeks.

According to the Nebraska Legislature, civil rights demonstrations in Omaha in 1963 led to the creation of the Omaha Human Rights Commission. According to a period documentary, this commission was set up only to placate civil rights activists, and because of that, failed. 4CL and other groups also saw this Commission as a stalling tactic by Omaha's city leaders.

Numerous national civil rights leaders made Omaha a stop on their speaking circuits. After Dr. King spoke in 1958, Malcolm X spoke in Omaha in 1964. In 1966 Robert F. Kennedy visited North Omaha during his presidential campaign and spoke at Creighton University in support of Omaha's civil rights activists.

Starting in 1963, the Black Association for Nationalism Through Unity (BANTU) was a unique Omaha youth activism group that organized African-American students in the city's high schools. Focusing on Black power and self-determination, BANTU claimed concessions from the Omaha City Council, with Senator Edward R. Danner lobbying the Nebraska State Legislature on their behalf. BANTU maintained a unique relationship with the Omaha chapter of the Black Panther Party (BPP). This may have included being a recruiting group for the BPP.

In the late 1960s and early 1970s, the Black Panthers were actively organizing Freedom Schools in Omaha's public housing projects. They were blamed for starting several of the riots in the 1960s. In 1970, Black Panther leaders David Rice and Edward Poindexter were charged and convicted of the murder of Omaha Police Officer Larry Minard with a bomb. Their case continues to be controversial, as Omaha Police allegedly withheld exculpatory evidence at trial. Targeted by the FBI's COINTELPRO, Rice and Poindexter are supported by Amnesty International with calls for retrial or release. The Nebraska Parole Board has recommended the men for release, but political leaders have not acted on these recommendations.

Achievements of the movement in Omaha included the desegregation of city facilities in the late 1950s, the 1964 event of Omahan Gale Sayers becoming the first African-American NFL player to share a room with a white player, and the 1966 production of the Oscar-nominated documentary A Time for Burning, which tracked the sentiment of 1960s white Omaha towards African Americans. In 1968 Marlin Briscoe, a football star and graduate of a local high school, became the first Black quarterback in the American Football League, and in 1970 local barber and law school graduate Ernie Chambers was elected to the Nebraska State Legislature as the newest African-American state legislator, preceded by other African Americans Edward Danner, John Adams Sr. and his son John Adams Jr. The Negro History Society formally opened the Great Plains Black History Museum in 1976 with the goal of celebrating African-American contributions to the city and region.

While the Omaha civil rights movement of the 1950s and 1960s did not gain its goals of passage of state laws to ensure equal housing and job opportunities, it did succeed in securing integrated school busing, and employment with the municipal transit company, for example. The movement also was seen as successful in raising awareness of the inequities facing African Americans in Omaha.

== 1972–present ==
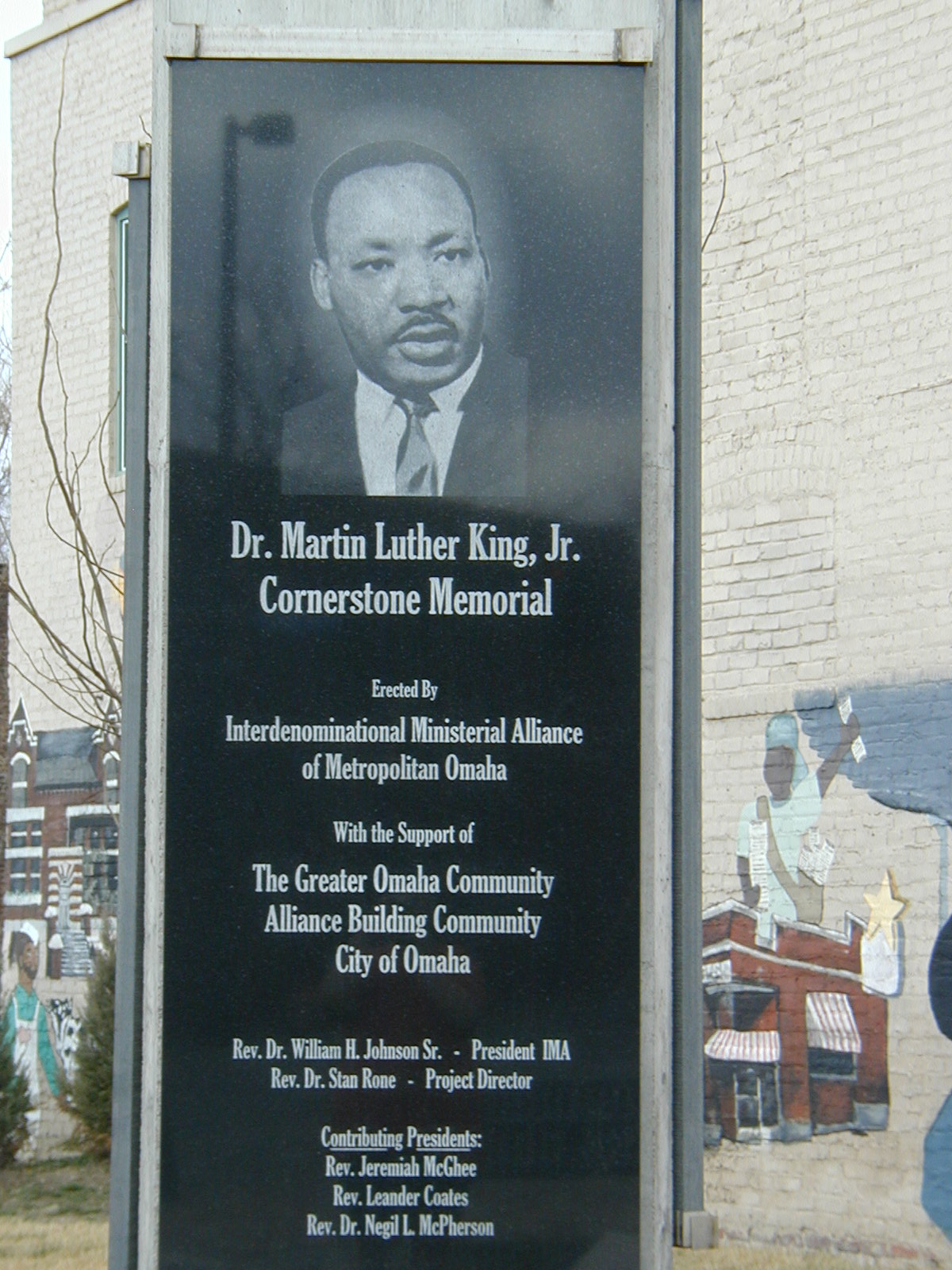
Photo of Dr. Martin Luther King Jr. Cornerstone Memorial at the NW corner of 24th and Lake St in North Omaha.

The City of Omaha installed the Dr. Martin Luther King Jr. Cornerstone Memorial at the NW corner of 24th and Lake Streets in 2002. In 2003, native Omahan Thomas Warren was named the city's first African-American police chief. His advancement could be seen as part of the political progression of African Americans in the city.

In 2005, Ernie Chambers became the longest-serving State Senator in Nebraska history, with more than 32 years of service to his community and state. Because of a term-limit bill enacted in the Nebraska State Legislature, Chambers was not allowed to immediately run for reelection when his term expired in 2009, so he waited until 2013 and ran again. He was reelected consistently until term limits again prevented him from running again in 2021. In total Ernie Chambers represented North Omaha in the Legislature for 46 years.

In response to West Omaha districts' concerns about schools, Senator Chambers proposed a controversial school separation plan for Omaha in the Nebraska State Legislature. He lobbied to create three districts in the city. Each was to be drawn along geographic boundaries that loosely correlated to the residential (and racial) housing patterns in the city: African Americans in North Omaha, Hispanic/Latinos in South Omaha, and Caucasians in West Omaha. The State Legislature signed this plan into law in April 2006.

Within a month, the National Association for the Advancement of Colored People brought a lawsuit. It argued that due to Omaha's racially segregated residential patterns, subdivided school districts will also be racially segregated, contrary to the historic case of Brown v. Board of Education. However, in 2007 the case was thrown out by the Nebraska Supreme Court under the Political question doctrine. In response to a separate lawsuit, the Nebraska Legislature agreed to revise the school funding formula and enacted other legislation to attempt to address the need for more equitable school funding and improved services for 'at-risk' students.

In May and June 2020, thousands of demonstrators filled Omaha streets to protest the murder of George Floyd in Minneapolis and other police killings. Police attacked demonstrators with tear gas and projectiles, in at least one case shooting a bystander in the face, blinding him. A white bar owner in the Old Market, Jacob Gardner, shot and killed unarmed protester James Scurlock. County Attorney Don Kleine declined to press charges against Gardner.

== See also ==
- History of North Omaha, Nebraska
- Timeline of North Omaha, Nebraska history
- History of slavery in Nebraska
- History of African Americans in Omaha in the 19th century

== Related publications ==
- Fletcher Sasse, Adam (2021) #OmahaBlackHistory: African American People, Places and Events in Omaha, NE. Olympia, WA: CommonAction Publishing
- Fletcher Sasse, Adam (2016) North Omaha History: Volume 1. Olympia, WA: CommonAction Publishing
- Fletcher Sasse, Adam (2016) North Omaha History: Volume 2. Olympia, WA: CommonAction Publishing
- Fletcher Sasse, Adam (2016) North Omaha History: Volume 3. Olympia, WA: CommonAction Publishing
