= Killing of Vivian Strong =

1969 shooting in Omaha, Nebraska

Shooting of Vivian Strong
- Strong depicted in an undated photo.
- Date: June 24, 1969
- Time: 10:35 pm
- Location: 1701 North 21st Street, Omaha, Nebraska
- Also known as: Logan Fontenelle Homes Housing Project
- Cause: Police shooting
- Participants: James Loder
- Outcome: Death
- Deaths: Vivian Strong
- Burial: Mount Hope Cemetery, Omaha
- Charges: Manslaughter

On June 24, 1969, Vivian Strong, a 14-year-old Black American girl, was killed in Omaha, Nebraska, United States, when a white police officer shot her in the back of the head without warning. The white police officer, and his Black partner, had been dispatched to the location because there were "juveniles breaking in." When they arrived at the scene a small group of teenagers fled out of an abandoned apartment where they had been dancing. The killing sparked three days of riots in Omaha's predominantly Black Northeast neighborhood.

After being suspended and then fired, the officer was charged with and pleaded not guilty to manslaughter. After the case, in which he personally testified, he was acquitted by an all-white jury and served two more years on the Omaha police force.

The shooting has since been showcased in several theatrical adaptations.

== Vivian Strong ==
The daughter of James and Kasie Strong, Vivian was born on December 24, 1954, in Philadelphia, Pennsylvania. She attended Tech Jr. High in Omaha, Nebraska and planned to become a secretary, but because of a heart condition she developed in 1964 (a leaky aortic valve), her attendance was irregular. She routinely visited local hospitals and care facilities; for example in January 1964 she stayed at the University of Nebraska Medical Center for over a month (January 23 - February 27), and from April to November of the same year, she was a "bed patient" at Hattie B. Munroe Home. She had one sister and six brothers. A childhood friend described her as, "so sweet" and "a good friend to everybody."

== Shooting ==
On June 24, 1969, no more than nine teenagers gathered, played music, and danced at a party hosted in a vacant apartment in the Logan Fontenelle Housing Project. Following a call to police about a suspected robbery, two officers arrived, and the teenagers fled out of the back door. James Loder—the white officer of the two—shot into the fleeing group without warning, which struck the then 14-year old Strong in the back of the head, killing her. Both James W. Smith—Loder's African American partner—and Strong's sister, Carol, asked Loder, "Why did you shoot her?", but he did not reply.

In the first news article about the incident, which appeared on the cover of the Omaha World Herald on June 25, 19-year old Linda Bradley, Strong's babysitter at the time, said, "We were playing records in the alley. We do it all the time. I even went around to the neighbors to see that it would be alright." She said when the police arrived they "went to see what was going on," and she concluded by saying Loder "shot her right in the head. He didn't holler, or shoot in the air or anything. There was only one shot."

=== Community response ===
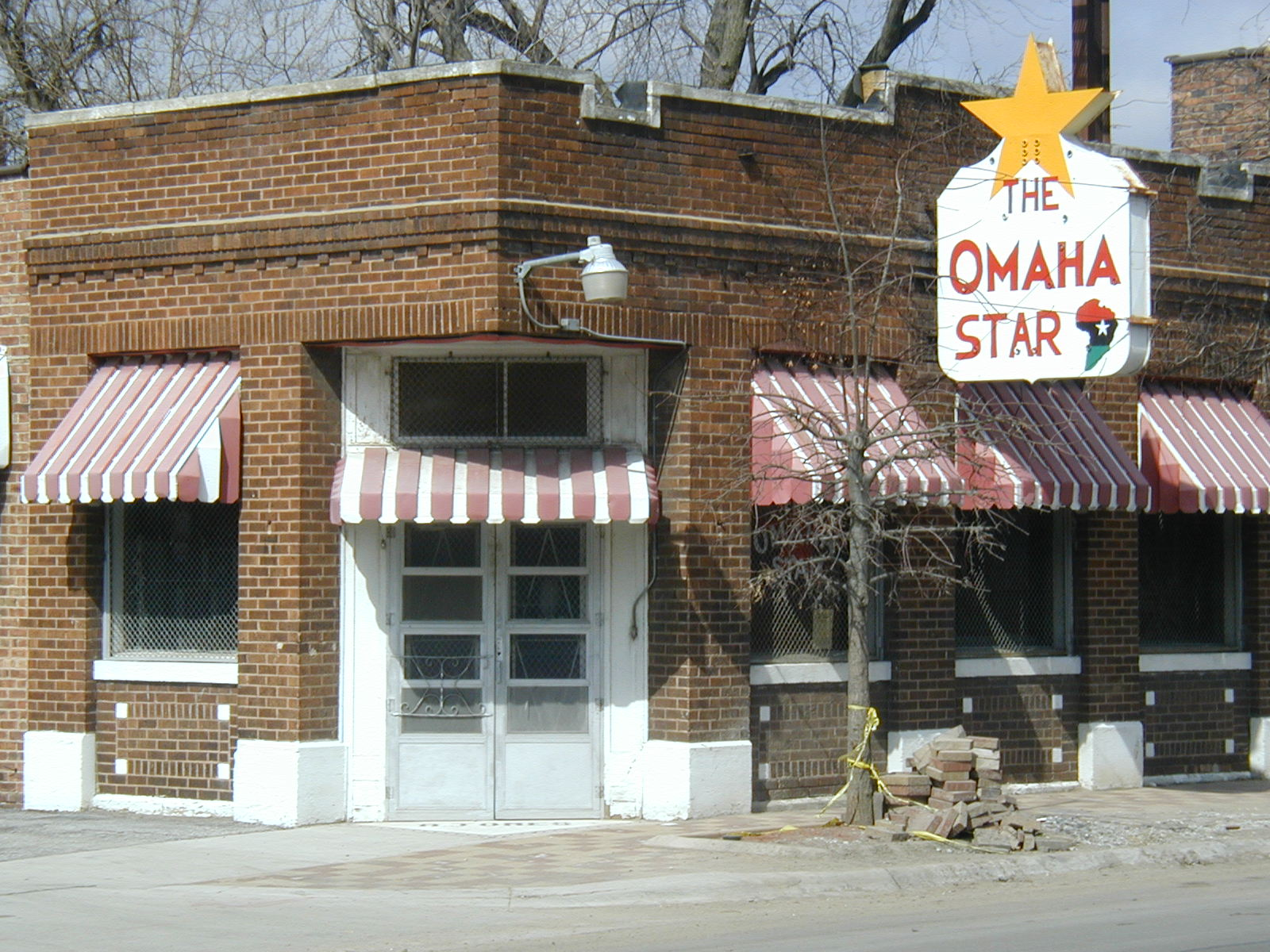
Building protected by the Black Panthers during the 1969 unrest.

Unrest followed for three days in Omaha's Northeast neighborhood, resulting in 88 injuries and over one million dollars in property damage and making national headlines. In just those three days, fifty-six arrests were made, all of them being African-Americans. During the riots, the Black Panthers, armed with weapons, protected Black churches and the local Black newspaper, the Omaha Star.

Within the week, on June 28, 30 Black and white women accused police of brutality in the Near North Side of Omaha, and of having a double standard for the treatment of white and Black people. The police chief denied both charges and talked to the delegation for over an hour. One of the women argued that police should give more attention to psychiatric screening of recruits before they are sent into the field. Similarly, two days later, Omaha Mayor Eugene Leahy met with a delegation of 15 African-American women, who complained about discrimination by the police; in response, the Mayor said their grievances would "be studied and analyzed".

Several days after the killing, activist Ernie Chambers called on the city to pay damages of $100,000 to the parents of Strong. Mayor Leahy responded by saying it was "ridiculous" and, "I'm not saying the $100,000 figure is ridiculous for a girl's life but it is ridiculous to demand that the city pay it," saying instead the remedy would be appropriately found in court. Members of the United Presbyterian Church contributed approximately $300 to the family of Strong, and approximately 35 Omaha policemen and firemen, most of whom were African American, contributed $150.

=== Funeral ===
Strong was buried at Mount Hope Cemetery in Omaha, Nebraska. Reverend General R. Woods, president of the Coordinating Committee for the Civil Liberties in Omaha, spoke at the funeral and said the death of Strong was due to "the actions as well as the inactions of the police, the city council, members of the legislature and citizens of Nebraska." Nebraska state senator Edward Danner said, "I feel ashamed to stand here today because I tried so hard in my legislative efforts." Senator Danner had tried to persuade the legislature to pass an amendment that would have made police more responsible for their actions.

== Legal proceedings ==
Initially, Police Chief Richard R. Anderson indicated Loder would be suspended for 15 days and then fired. Loder was released from jail on a $500 bond, and Local 531 of the AFL-CIO Employees Union contributed at least $3,000 to Loder's defense.

He entered a plea of "not guilty" to the charge of manslaughter. In the time period between the shooting and court case, Loder sought reinstatement by the City Personnel Board, but the board chose to withhold action pending the outcome of the criminal case.

=== Preliminary hearing ===
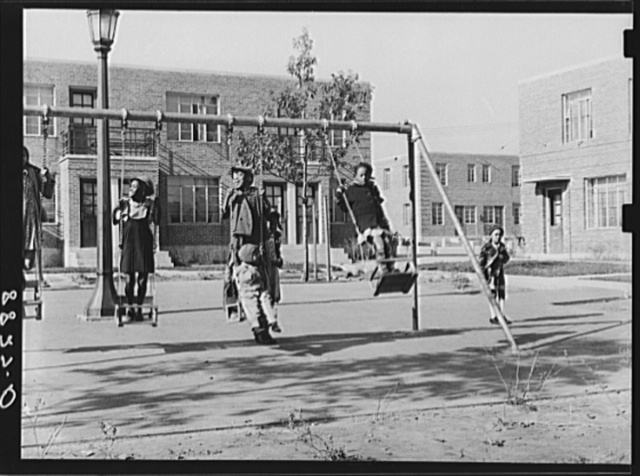
Children playing at the Logan Fontenelle Housing Project (1938)

Since officials banned all statements following the shooting, it was not until the preliminary hearing that the public heard Loder's version of what happened. Loder's statement, taken three hours after the shooting, was read in court, saying, "If I had known it was a female, I wouldn't have fired the shot." Loder claimed he called out three times to the fleeing person, "Stop or I'll shoot." During his testimony, Officer Smith said, "I believe Officer Loder said something like 'halt' or 'stop'."

On the second day of the preliminary hearing, the defense raised two motions to dismiss charges against Officer Loder, though these were rejected. On that same day, the judge commented from the bench to clarify that entering the vacant apartment at 1701 North 21st Avenue Plaza, was not a felony because it had not been established whether the front or back doors were locked.

A total of 21 witnesses were called by the state during the preliminary hearing. Two witnesses, ages 12 and 24, were dismissed when they started "sobbing" while testifying. Judge Simon A. Simon presided over the hearing, the county attorney was Donald Knowles, and the defense attorneys were Joseph J. Vance and Paul Watts.

Loder was ordered to stand trial for manslaughter in Douglas County District Court after a four-day preliminary hearing. After announcing his decision, Judge Simon said, "After we adjourn and everybody clears this courtroom, I don't want anything done or said that will offend the defendant or any police officer. I don't want any arguments or remarks made to provoke an argument in the courtroom or in the halls of the third floor of City Hall." Afterward, in an interview, Judge Simon said he relied heavily upon a 1929 Nebraska Supreme Court decision in the case of Broquet vs. The State of Nebraska. In that case, the Supreme Court asked the jury to consider, "A police officer, in arresting one who is guilty of a misdemeanor, may use such force as, to an ordinarily prudent person, appears reasonably necessary under the circumstances, even to the taking of life; but, if the officer slay the offender while effecting his arrest, the question as to whether he used more force than was, under the circumstances, reasonably necessary."

=== Trial ===
James Loder's trial for manslaughter began on Monday, March 9, 1970, with District Court Judge Lawrence C. Krell. The defense lawyers were Joseph J. Vance and Paul Watts. The county attorney was Donald Knowles and the deputy attorney was Lawrence Corrigan. Loder faced a possible prison sentence of one to ten years. 32-witnesses were called to testify by the state.

During opening remarks, Corrigan said the original call made to police mentioned "juveniles breaking in." He said that when Loder chased Strong, there were "children all over", but that Loder had not called for the fleeing person to halt. But for the defense, Watts argued that there was no mention of juveniles in the original call to Car 206, but instead, "parties breaking in now," and that Loder had indeed called out a command to halt three times before firing. He also noted Loder's more than ten years of experience with the police and military.

His partner, Smith, testified that he heard Loder shout, "'Hey halt, stop' or something like that", while all other witnesses said Loder gave no warning. One witness stated that when Loder pulled his gun, one child playing in the area shouted, "Don't shoot her mister!"

Loder and his partner both testified that the call to Car 206 said, "parties are breaking in." But radio dispatchers had said—as recordings of the calls proved—"juveniles breaking in."

On Thursday, March 12, Sheriff Janing of Douglas County was visited by FBI agents in his office, saying that the agents expressed concern about out-of-town Black "militants" in Omaha, possibly to "exploit the Loder case". Also on the fourth day, Lew Davis, a member of the National Committee to Combat Fascism, read a statement in the courthouse lobby: "Black people have gathered here at the courthouse for the trial of James Loder to show that we are dissatisfied with the way that the Loder case is being dealt with. Namely, that the prosecution and the defense lawyers are cooperating very clearly in an attempt to get Loder acquitted."

Early on the fifth day, a telephoned bomb threat shut down the courtroom, but following a search, nothing was found. Afterward, one member of the jury was dismissed and replaced, and the state rested its case. The defense attorney asked that the trial be dismissed because the "state had failed to prove its case"; Judge Krell took it under advisement. In rebuttal, county attorney Knowles argued that if Strong committed any crime prior to Loder's arrival—such as her entry in the apartment—it was a misdemeanor and did not call for the use of force.

==== Loder testimony ====
Loder testified on the sixth day of the trial, Monday, March 16, on the stand for approximately an hour. After receiving a dispatch to investigate a break-in, Loder said that he and his partner drove quickly without sirens or lights to the location, about ten blocks away. The area was dimly lit and his partner, Smith, was arresting one young person while Loder ran into a playground area to the south, in which he heard a thump and turned around. There, he saw someone hunched over, outside a window. He pursued the person around a corner and through a backyard area, shouting (according to Loder) three times for the fleeing person to halt, or he would shoot. "I drew my weapon, I fired one shot," he said. Apparently afraid the person was getting away, he testified that he needed to shoot. On the stand he denied testimony from other witnesses that he had kicked Strong's body to turn her over. Instead, he said he lifted her arm to turn her partway over, to look for a wound, but did not find one.

=== Verdict ===
On March 17, 1970, after approximately 12 hours of deliberation, an all-white jury of six men and six women acquitted James Loder of manslaughter. One juror said, "It was one of the hardest decisions I ever had to make. I felt that if you don't give police the authority to act we are just not going to have any law and order at all." Of the acquittal, Strong's mother said,

He did wrong. They [the jury] did wrong. ... If it would have been a white girl shot by a black policeman, he'd be serving time right now.

== James Loder after the verdict ==
Loder returned to the police force, where he served for two more years. The Omaha World Herald published an editorial on 2 April 1970, that disagreed with the decision to reinstate Loder to the police force,

With all allowance for the difficulties which the board faced in reaching it, we do not believe reinstatement was the right decision.

After serving at a desk job for many months, on February 1, 1971, Loder was assigned to a patrol cruiser from 6 pm to 2 am in a police district that included Near North Omaha, the location of Strong's shooting. The reassignment was made public, and complaints were made to the mayor of Omaha and governor of Nebraska, and Loder was subsequently assigned to patrol the west side of Omaha.

On Monday, November 29, 1971, Loder was fired by police Chief Richard Andersen for a series of rule infractions, including failure to appear in court to testify as a city witness, misuse of police radio, insubordination to a sergeant, and failure to pass uniform inspection.

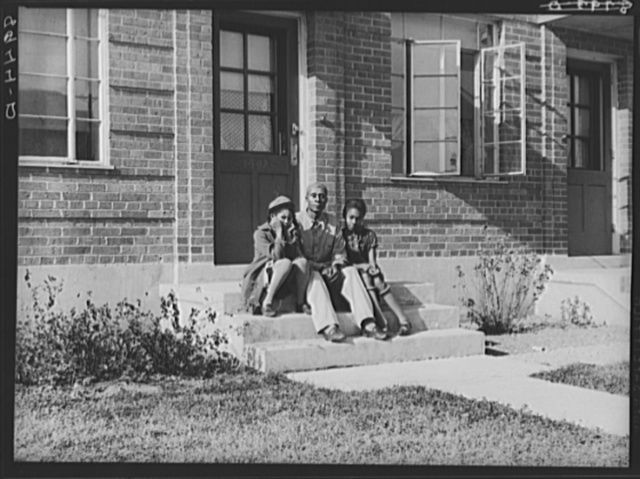
1938 photo from the Logan Fontenelle Housing Project in Omaha, Nebraska.

Loder was the estranged adopted son of Hollywood actress Hedy Lamarr and actor John Loder, both of whom had claimed him as their adopted son. A DNA test proved him not to be biologically related to either, as documented in Bombshell: The Hedy Lamarr Story.

== Aftermath ==
Strong's parents were divorced at the time of the shooting. During the unrest, her father, James Strong, said,

I've been very confused this week. Our whole family took Vivian's death very hard. All this trouble doesn't help at all. — J. Strong (1969)

One of Strong's younger sisters, Carol, was with her when she was killed; Carol did not receive any counseling afterward. Her mother had a nervous breakdown, and Carol subsequently took over the care of her younger brothers and sisters.

In March 1970, approximately nine months after the deadly shooting, Strong's mother, Kasie Strong, sued James Loder for $75,000 in district court for future loss of "earnings, support, and service".

Strong's 17 year-old brother, Orlando, was fined $100 and sentenced to 90 days in jail after throwing a rock toward a police cruiser on April 10, 1970, less than a month after the Strong verdict. Later the same year, on October 25, 1970, Orlando published a poem about the shooting of his sister in the classified newspaper section of the Omaha World Herald. The poem ends with the four lines

He could have fired a warning shot
as he gunned her down in a very small lot.
What a price for suspicion of burglary
and Loder walked away – scott free.

== Legacy ==
=== Vivian Strong Street ===
In April 2023 the Omaha City Council voted unanimously to name 21st Street from Clark Street to Paul Street, "Vivian Strong Street." On June 16, 2023, the Vivian Strong Street sign was unveiled.

=== Vivian Strong Memorial Liberation School ===
The summer of Strong's death, the Black Panther Party (BPP) established the Vivian Strong Memorial Liberation School. The BPP established Liberation Schools in several US cities. The school in Omaha may have operated for only a week before it closed down.

=== Theater ===
Sometime between 1969 and 1972, the Afro Academy of Dramatic Arts in Omaha presented a play written by Reverend Darryl Eure comparing the killing of Strong to that of Emmett Till.

Since then, three plays have been produced relating to Strong. Monica Bauer's 2019 play, Vivian's Music: 1969, imagines the last days of her life; it won an award at the Edinburgh Fringe Festival and was produced off-off-Broadway at 59E59 Theaters in New York City. Christopher Maly's 2018 play, The Blues of Knowing Why, was a "community account" of her short life based on interviews with friends, family, media, and members of resistance organizations, produced in Omaha's Union for Contemporary Arts. In 2025 the performance Northside Carnation depicted the day-after response by Mildred Brown, editor and founder of the Omaha Star.
