= Mildred Brown =

American journalist and publisher

Mildred D. Brown
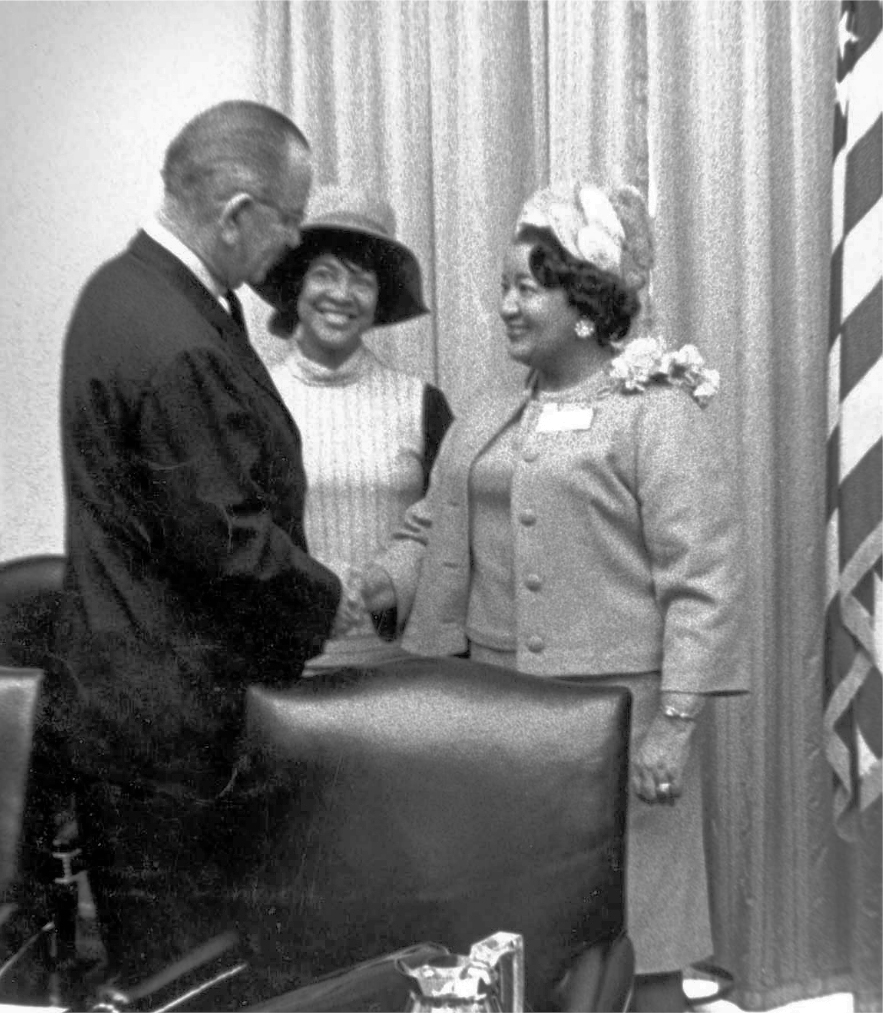
- Then U.S. President Lyndon Johnson greets Mildred Brown in 1965
- Born: December 20, 1905; Alabama, U.S.
- Died: November 2, 1989 (aged 83); Omaha, Nebraska, U.S.
- Occupations: Newspaper publisher, civic activist
- Spouse: S. Edward Gilbert (ex)

Mildred D. Brown (December 20, 1905 – November 2, 1989) was an African-American journalist, newspaper publisher and leader in the Civil Rights Movement in Omaha, Nebraska. Part of the Great Migration, she travelled from Alabama via New York and Des Moines, Iowa. In Omaha, she and her husband founded and ran the Omaha Star, a newspaper of the African-American community.

After 1945, Brown continued to run alone what was the only African-American newspaper in Omaha. It became the only newspaper of the African-American community in the state. She used its influence for education, community building, supporting the national civil-rights movement and opening up jobs for blacks. In the 1960s, President Lyndon Johnson appointed her as a goodwill ambassador to East Germany.

Brown was the first African-American and one of only three women inducted into the Omaha Business Hall of Fame. She also has been posthumously inducted into the Nebraska Journalism Hall of Fame (2007) and the Omaha Press Club Journalism of Excellence Hall of Fame (2008).

== Early life and family ==
Mildred Brown was born in Bessemer, Alabama, in 1905 to Rev. and Mrs. Bennie J. Brown, a prominent African-American family. Her mother was a teacher. They encouraged her education. In 1931, Brown graduated from Miles College (then called Miles Memorial Teachers College), an historically black college (HBCU) founded in Birmingham, Alabama, by the Christian Methodist Episcopal Church.

Brown worked as a teacher in Birmingham, where she met and married S. Edward Gilbert, a pharmacy graduate of Howard University. They moved to Chicago, where Brown studied at Chicago Normal College, and then to Des Moines, where she took journalism at Drake University. Brown started in journalism and started selling advertising and writing news at the Silent Messenger in Sioux City, Iowa, where Gilbert was editor.

At the invitation of a friend who invited them to his paper, in 1937 they moved to Omaha. Initially, Brown worked as advertising manager.

== Career ==
In 1938, the couple founded the Omaha Star. By 1945, it was the only remaining African-American newspaper in Omaha and the largest in the state. Brown was the owner and publisher until her death in 1989. Still operating, it has become the longest-running newspaper in the city's history and is the only black paper printed in the state.

Brown and Gilbert divorced in 1943, with Brown taking charge of the newspaper's operations as the "advertising and general manager". She used the newspaper as a way of expanding opportunities for the African-American community, especially for jobs. She hired young black men and provided scholarships for education. She refused to accept advertising from businesses that discriminated against blacks in hiring and also led customer boycotts of them to achieve change. Seeing the paper as a center of community journalism, she promoted positive news about accomplishments of individuals and groups.

In the late 1940s, Brown became involved with Omaha's DePorres Club, a group of high school and Creighton University students fighting against racial discrimination in Omaha. They led a sit-in at a cafe near the courthouse. After Creighton kicked the group off campus for too much activism, Brown volunteered the Star's office for use by the club. She also provided the group with her informal guidance and support.

Restructuring of industry and loss of jobs produced hard years in Omaha. Brown's balanced coverage of the 1960s riots earned commendation from President Johnson. She continued her activism to persuade businesses to make more opportunities open to blacks.

In the 1970s, Brown joined the Citizens Co-Ordinating Committee for Civil Liberties (also known as Citizens Civic Committee for Civil Liberties), better known as the 4CL. Created by prominent black church leaders, the group continued efforts for broader grassroots employment. It also added the issues of housing, civil rights and social justice. As a well-known journalist and publisher, Brown had a wide circle of friends, who invited her on many travels for business, conventions, social events and meetings with other publishers of black and white papers. Because of her prominent position in Nebraska's largest city, she also knew a wide array of politicians and national leaders.

Brown lived in an apartment in the Omaha Star building in the North Omaha neighborhood from 1938 to her death in 1989 from a cold. Her niece, Dr. Marguerita Washington, continued to publish the newspaper until her own death in 2016. In 2019, the assets of the newspaper were purchased by the Mildred D. Brown Memorial Study Center, which continues to run the newspaper today.

== Honors ==
- Brown was the first African American and the second woman inducted into the Omaha Business Hall of Fame.
- In the 1960s, President Johnson commended Brown for her balanced coverage of civil rights efforts and riots, and appointed her as a goodwill ambassador to travel to East Germany.
- The National Newspaper Publishers Association, with 200 member owners of black newspapers, once recognized the Omaha Star as having the "Best Church Page".
- In 2007, the Omaha Star Building was listed on the National Register of Historic Places because of the newspaper's significance in the history of Omaha, journalism and the civil rights movement.
- In 2007, Brown was posthumously inducted into the Nebraska Journalism Hall of Fame.
- in May 2008, Brown was posthumously inducted into the first class of the Omaha Press Club Journalists of Excellence Hall of Fame.
- The Mildred Brown Memorial Strolling Park was dedicated in her honor in May 2008 next to the Omaha Star building.
- Her niece, Dr. Marguerita Washington, founded the non-profit Mildred D. Brown Memorial Study Center in 2007 to provide scholarships for journalism students to explore communication fields.

== See also ==
- Civil Rights Movement in Omaha, Nebraska
- History of North Omaha, Nebraska
