= Omaha Star =

Newspaper in Nebraska, US

The Omaha Star

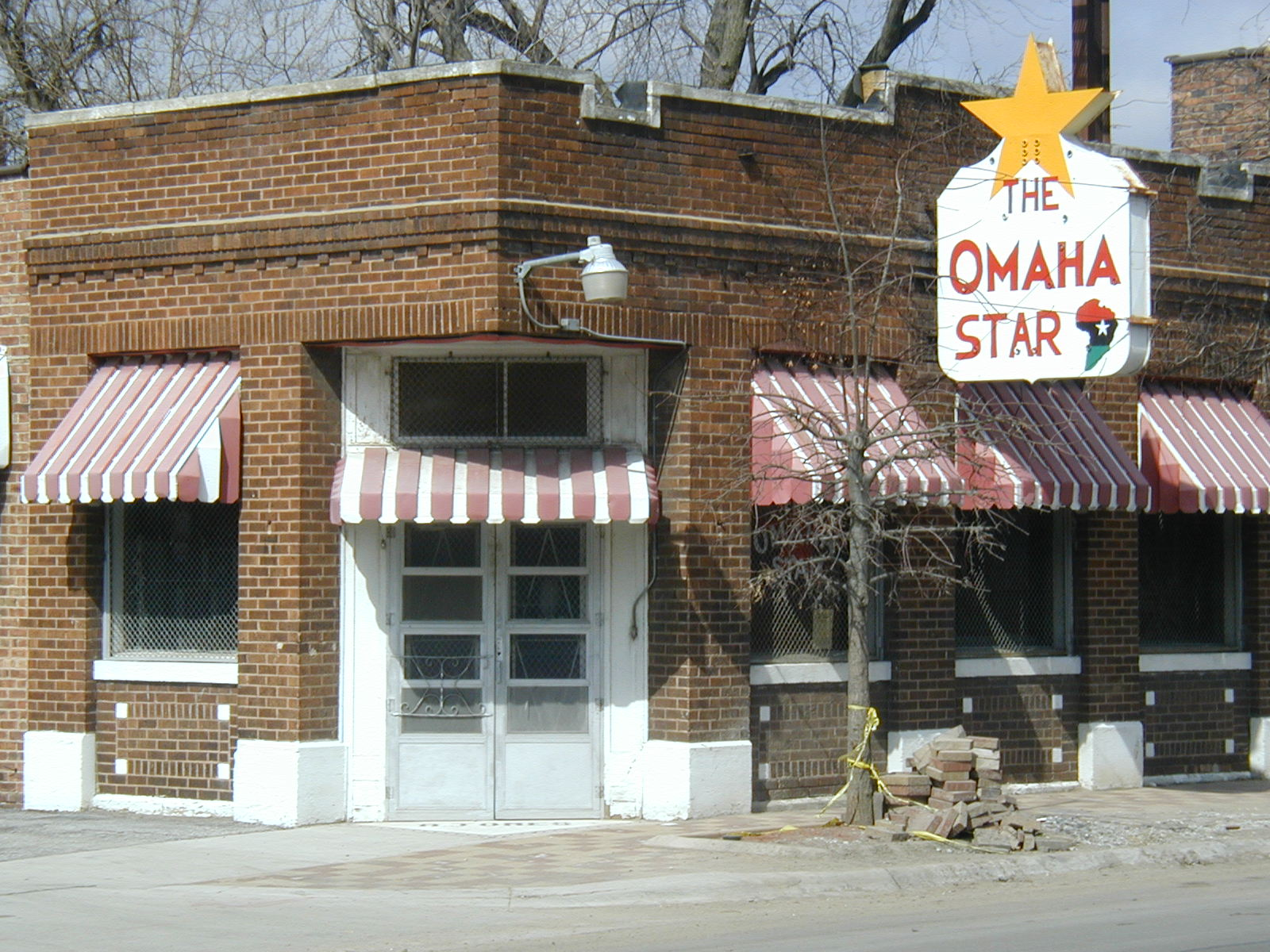
- The Omaha Star building
- Type: Weekly newspaper
- Format: Tabloid
- Owner: Terri D. Sanders
- Publisher: Terri D. Sanders
- Founded: July 9, 1938; 88 years ago
- Language: English
- Headquarters: 2216 N 24th St Omaha, NE 68110
- Circulation: 30,000
- Website: www.omahastarnewspaper.com

The Omaha Star is a newspaper founded in 1938 in North Omaha, Nebraska, by Mildred Brown and her husband S. Edward Gilbert. Housed in the historic Omaha Star building in the Near North Side neighborhood. Today, it is the only remaining African-American newspaper in Omaha. It may be the only newspaper in the United States started by an African-American woman.

== History ==
The first issue of The Omaha Star was published on July 9, 1938, at their offices at 2216 N. 24th Street in North Omaha. Five thousand copies were printed and sold for ten cents each. With the banner "Joy and Happiness", the Star featured positive news about the black community in North Omaha, Nebraska. Celebrating positive African-American families, role models and accomplishments, the Star quickly became a pillar of the North Omaha community. By 1945 it was the only black newspaper remaining in Omaha, the state's largest city.

In the 1950s the Omaha Star won national respect by reporting the Omaha African-American community's perspectives on local and national news. Readers were encouraged to vote and run for office. The DePorres Club, an early youth-led Omaha-based civil rights group founded in 1947, met at the offices of the Omaha Star in the early 1950s after Creighton University kicked them off campus. As publisher, Brown used pressure to persuade advertisers to accept blacks in more positions. Her coverage of civil rights and riots in the 1960s earned her commendations from President Lyndon Johnson.

After Brown died in 1989, her niece, Dr. Marguerita Washington, took over leadership until her own death in 2016. In 2019, the newspaper assets were purchased by the Mildred D. Brown Memorial Study Center. The paper continues today as a weekly print and digital subscription publication.

== Present ==
Today the Star's circulation is approximately 30,000 and is distributed to 48 states. A 2001 survey found each copy of the paper is read six times before being discarded. In its 85-plus-year history, The Omaha Star has never missed an edition. Omaha jazz legend Preston Love worked as an advertising specialist for the Star before his death.

In spring 2006 the paper's building was designated an Omaha Landmark by the City of Omaha. In January 2007, the Omaha City Council awarded a community development grant to the Omaha Star for remodeling purposes. The Star building is located in the North Omaha Neighborhood Revitalization Strategy Area and the North 24th Street Business District. Marguerita Washington, the owner and publisher, announced a partnership with Metropolitan Community College to create a memorial adjacent to the Star office to honor Washington's aunt and Star founder Mildred Brown. Metropolitan Community College students began landscaping on the "Mildred Brown Strolling Park" in 2007.

In 2020, Symone Sanders' mother, Terri D. Sanders, was named the new publisher. She purchased the paper in June 2023.

== Honors and recognition ==
- 1996 - The Star was inducted into the Omaha Chamber of Commerce Business Hall of Fame
- Received the Golden Spike Award presented by the Greater Omaha Chamber of Commerce. Established in 1979, the award recognizes businesses that have made outstanding contributions to the Omaha economy.
- 2007 - Dr. Marguerita Washington founded the non-profit Mildred D. Brown Memorial Study Center in honor of her aunt, for scholarships for journalism students. It is located at the Omaha Star building.

The Omaha Star is a member of the National Newspapers Publishers Association.

- In 2008 the Omaha Star building was listed on the National Register of Historic Places for its important association with the civil rights movement.

== See also ==
- History of North Omaha, Nebraska
- List of newspapers in the United States
