= DePorres Club =

American civil rights organization

The DePorres Club was an early pioneer organization in the Civil Rights Movement in Omaha, Nebraska, whose "goals and tactics foreshadowed the efforts of civil rights activists throughout the nation in the 1960s." The club was an affiliate of CORE.

== History ==
The DePorres Club was formed in 1947 by a group of African American high school students and white college students who worked with Rev. John Markoe of Creighton University, a Catholic Jesuit University in Omaha. The club’s early mission was to improve interracial relations on the Creighton campus. Their patron, Martin de Porres, a Peruvian of mixed ancestry, was canonized by the Catholic Church in 1962. Within a year DePorres extended their reach, working to challenge the history of racism in Omaha. According to club member and eventual founder of the Great Plains Black History Museum Bertha Calloway, the organization deliberately targeted Reid’s Ice Cream, the Coca-Cola bottling plant at 3200 North 30th Street, Dignotti’s Doughnut Shop, Harry’s Tea Club, the Greyhound Bus station, the Hotel Fontenelle, the Paxton Hotel, and Eppley Air Field for not hiring black workers.

The group met at Creighton until it became too controversial and was asked to move off campus. Omaha Star publisher and community ally Mildred Brown volunteered the newspaper's office for the club after Creighton kicked them off campus. In 1948, a group of 30 members of the DePorres Club participated in the club's first sit-in at a restaurant by the Douglas County Courthouse in Downtown Omaha. When the group arrived the owner told them that white customers would stop coming into the restaurant if blacks were served; in response, the group stayed until the owner agreed to allow African American patrons. The Club also called for a general boycott against the Omaha and Council Bluffs Street Railway Company for their segregation practices and poor service to the Near North Side neighborhood four years before the Montgomery bus boycott.

Aside from its activism, the club regularly held other activities, as well. They staged events to raise funds, had their own dances and picnics. They painted houses for poor families and stuffed acres of envelopes.

In the following years the club hosted a community center called the Omaha DePorres Center to meet the needs of low-income families, and eventually started branches in Denver and Kansas City.

== See also ==
- Timeline of the civil rights movement in Omaha, Nebraska
- History of North Omaha, Nebraska
- History of Omaha, Nebraska
