= Omaha Police Department =

Law enforcement agency of Omaha, Nebraska, United States

Coordinates: 41°15′19″N 95°56′06″W

- Patch of Omaha Police Department

- Badge of Omaha Police Department
- Motto: To Serve and Protect

Agency overview
- Formed: 1857; 169 years ago
- Annual budget: $160 million (2020)

Jurisdictional structure
- Legal jurisdiction: Municipal

Operational structure
- Sworn members: ▼809 of 906 (2025)
- Agency executive: Todd Schmaderer, Chief of police

Facilities
- Stations: 6
- helicopters: 3

Website
- Omaha Police Department

The Omaha Police Department (OPD) is the principal law enforcement agency of the city of Omaha, Nebraska, United States. It is nationally accredited by the Commission on Accreditation for Law Enforcement Agencies. The OPD is the largest law enforcement agency in the state of Nebraska.

The OPD has 906 sworn officers covering an area of 118.9 square miles (308 km^{2}) and a population of 478,192 people (2019 census estimate) within city limits.

== History ==
In 1941, the department chose a distinctive badge design. The design is still in use today.

There have been 25 deaths of Omaha Police Department officers in the line of duty. Officer Larry Minard was killed on August 17, 1970, by a bomb placed by members of the Black Panther Party. The Omaha Police Department was heavily involved in the FBI's COINTELPRO operation, and using evidence from COINTELPRO, and from the confession of Duane Peak, Panthers David Rice (now known as Mondo we Langa) and Ed Poindexter were convicted for Minard's death and were both sentenced to life in prison. The guilt of the two has been questioned, and Amnesty International has released reports criticizing the prosecution's actions in the Rice/Poindexter Case. Rice later died in prison.

Officer James B. Wilson, Jr. died on August 20, 1995. He was killed while sitting in his cruiser after pulling over a van with fictitious plates. Two of eight gang members in the vehicle exited and shot Wilson with an AK-47 and a 9 mm semi-automatic pistol.

Officer Jason Pratt died on September 19, 2003, a week after being admitted to the intensive care unit with a gunshot wound to the head. Pratt, a member of the Omaha Police's SWAT team, was shot in the line of duty during a foot pursuit.

On March 21, 2013, while responding to a parking complaint, an Omaha policeman punched a man named Octavius Johnson and threw him to the ground by his neck. The ACLU filed a lawsuit on Johnson's behalf. This came to be referred to as the 33rd and Seward incident. The officer was fired but reinstated after arbitration.

On August 26, 2014, Omaha policemen accidentally shot and killed television sound technician Bryce Dion. Dion was killed while his team was filming an episode of the TV show Cops.

Officer Kerrie Orozco, a 7-year veteran of the Omaha Police Department, and a member of the Gang Unit, was shot and killed on May 20, 2015. Officer Orozco was part of the Metro Area Fugitive Task Force, and was in the process of serving an arrest warrant when the suspect opened fire, striking Orozco; she was rushed to CHI Health Creighton University Medical Center, where she succumbed to her injuries. The suspect was also shot, and was taken to the hospital, where he too succumbed to his injuries.^{[4]} This was the first time an officer died in the line of duty since Officer Jason Pratt was shot and killed. Orozco was also the first female Omaha Police officer killed in the line of duty.

On January 23, 2016, Omaha Police Department police dog Kobus was shot and killed while attempting to apprehend a barricaded suspect following a standoff that began when Douglas County Sheriff's Deputies attempted to serve a mental health-related warrant. Kobus was the first known K9 with the Omaha Police Department to have been killed in the line of duty.

In June 2017, a schizophrenic man named Zachary Bear Heels died while being restrained by Omaha police, who used a stun gun on him 12 times, including while he was handcuffed. Four officers were terminated but three were later reinstated: the remaining officer was acquitted of charges of second-degree assault. The city paid Bear Heels' mother a $550,000 legal settlement.

== Organization ==
=== Command structure ===
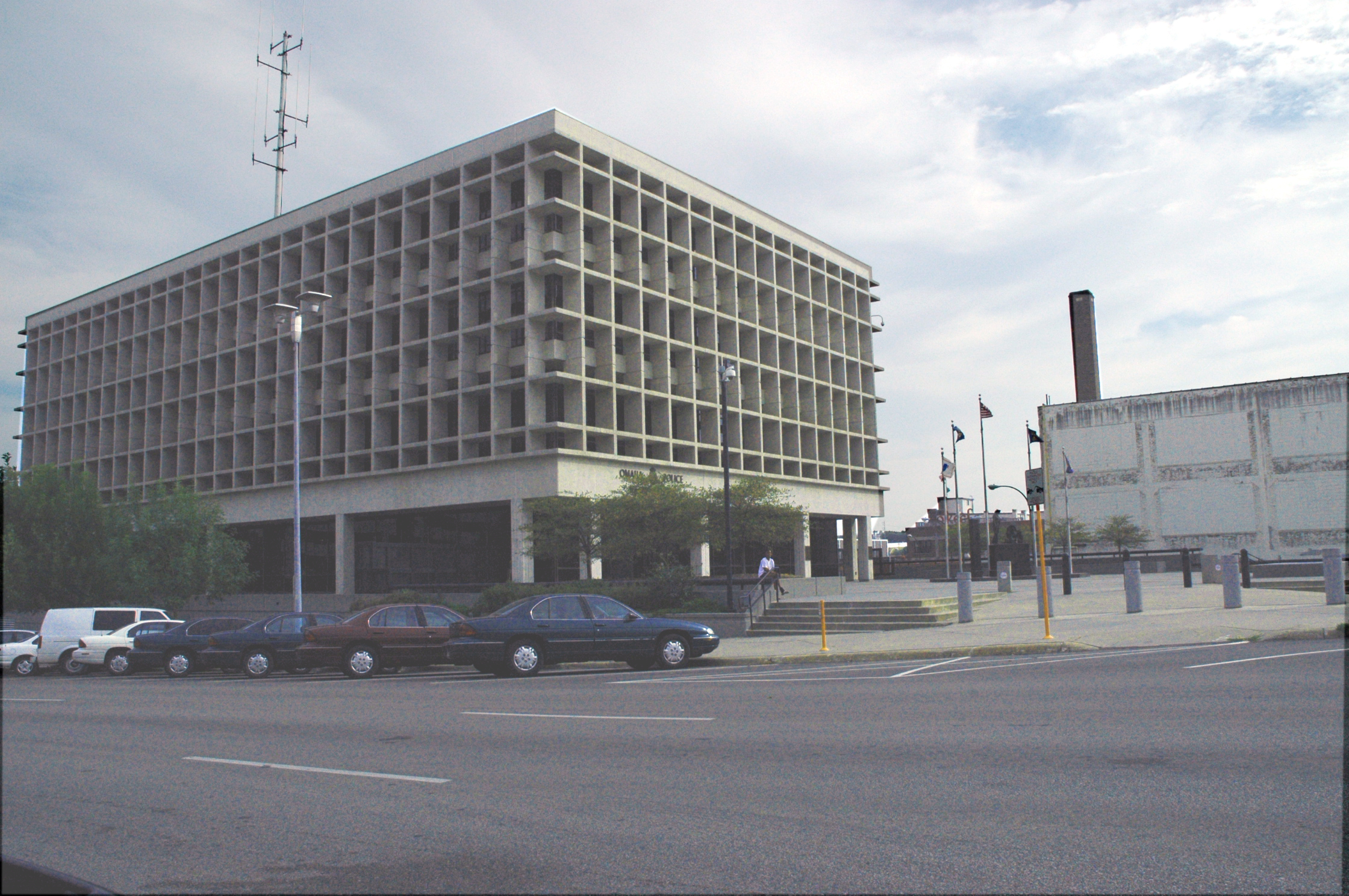
Omaha Police Headquarters

Police Chief Todd Schmaderer has served as Chief of police since 2012. He was appointed by the mayor with approval by the Omaha City Council, as are all Omaha police chiefs. Below the Chief rank, there are five sworn Deputy Chiefs and one non-sworn Deputy Director who are responsible for the Uniform Patrol Bureau, Criminal Investigations Bureau, Police Services Bureau, Executive Services Bureau and the Professional Standards Bureau.

=== Rank structure and insignia ===
Rank	Insignia
Chief of Police	
Deputy Chief	
Captain	
Lieutenant	
Sergeant	
Police Officer*	
Police Officer	

- Officers with at least seven years' service with the department wear two blue chevrons on their uniforms. This insignia was introduced in 2016 to recognize officers for continued service over an extended period of time with the department. It is not a supervisory rank.

=== Omaha Police Chiefs ===
- Todd R. Schmaderer (2012–Present)
- David L. Baker (interim, 2012)
- Alex N. Hayes (2009–2012)
- Eric W. Buske (2008–2009)
- Thomas H. Warren, Sr. (2003–2008)
- Alan F. Pepin (interim, 2003)
- Donald L. Carey (1998–2003)
- Charles J. Circo (interim; 1997–1998)
- James N. Skinner (1989–1997)
- Robert C. Wadman (1982–1989)
- Jack D. Swanson (1981–1982)
- Elwin Lewis Stokes (1981)
- Richard R. Andersen (1967–1981)
- Lester K. Smith (1965–1966)
- C. Harold Ostler (1957–1964 and 1966–1967)
- Harry N. Green (1954–1957)
- Henry Boesen (1951–1954)
- Fred Franks (1948–1950)
- Robert Munch (1947–1948)
- Paul Haze (1944–1947)
- Bob Samardick (1935–1936 and 1944)
- George W. Allen (1932–1935)
- John J. Pszanowski (1928–1932 and 1936–1944)
- Charles VanDeusen (1924–1928)
- Peter Dillon (1923–1924)
- Marshal Eberstein (1918–1921)
- Michael Dempsey (1918 and 1921–1923)
- Henry W. Dunn (1912–1918)
- J. J. Donahue (1899–1912)
- Con Gallegher (1897–1898)
- Al Sigwart (1895–1897)
- Martin J. White (1895 and 1898–1899)
- Webber S. Seavey (Omaha's first police chief; August 1887–June 1895)

=== Chief history ===
Webber Seavey, the Omaha Police Department's first chief, founded the International Association of Chiefs of Police in 1893. In 1982, Robert C. Wadman was the first Chief to be appointed from outside the ranks of the Omaha Police (he was Utah Deputy Commissioner of Public Safety), serving until 1989. Thomas Warren, named by Mayor Mike Fahey in 2003, was the first African American to serve as Chief in the Omaha Police Department. He served until 2008.

=== Patrol area ===
The city of Omaha is divided into five geographical areas by the department, with a precinct in each area; Northeast, Southeast, Northwest, Southwest, and West. Omaha Airport Authority Police Department is a separate agency and is the law enforcement agency at Eppley Airfield, a medium-hub, primary airport serving Greater Omaha and the region.

=== Specialized divisions and units ===
Like most urban police departments, OPD has specialized squads and units to deal with the differing law enforcement issues of the city. Units include:

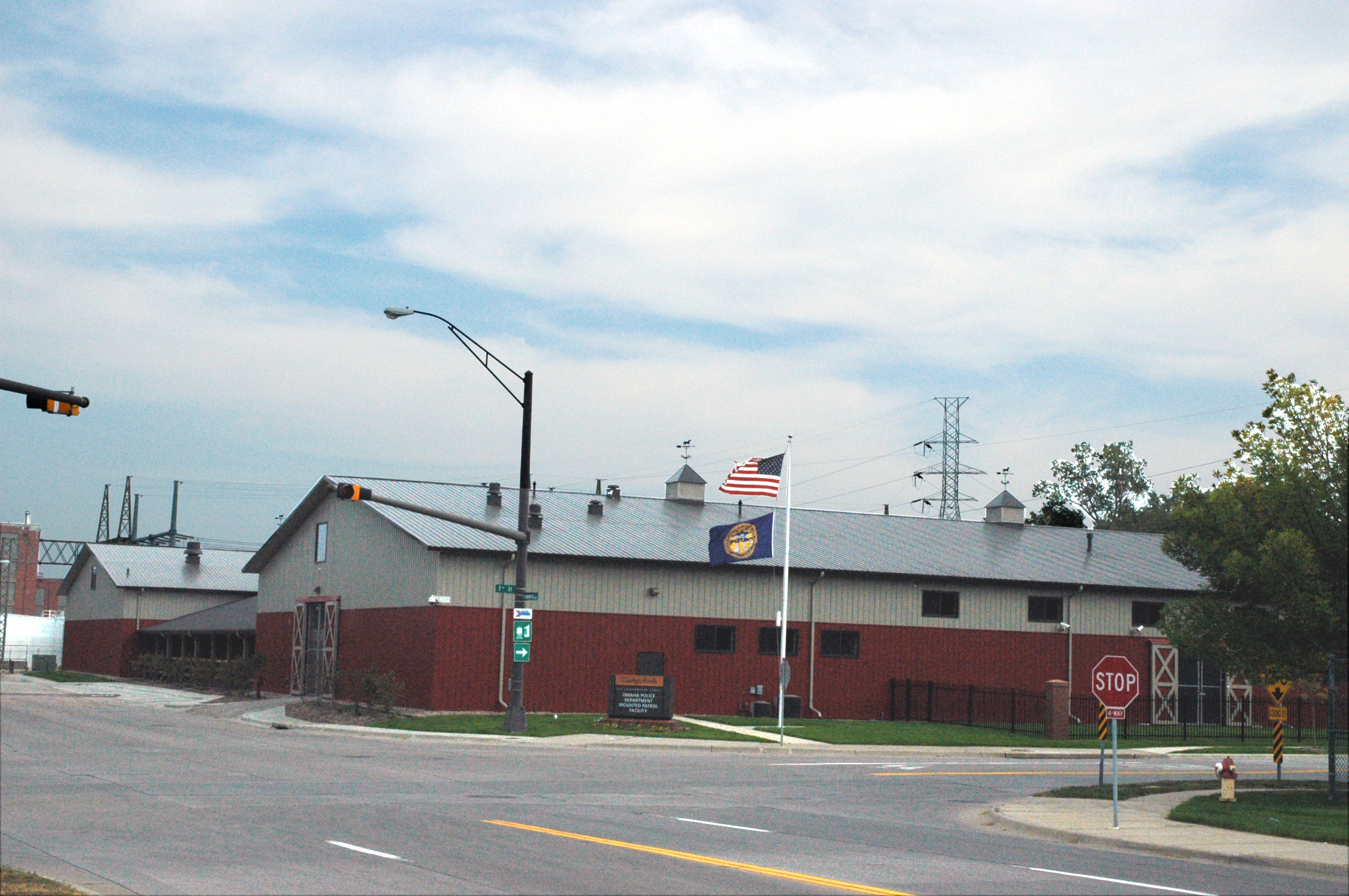
Omaha Police Department Mounted Patrol Unit horse barn at 615 Leavenworth Street, opened in 2005

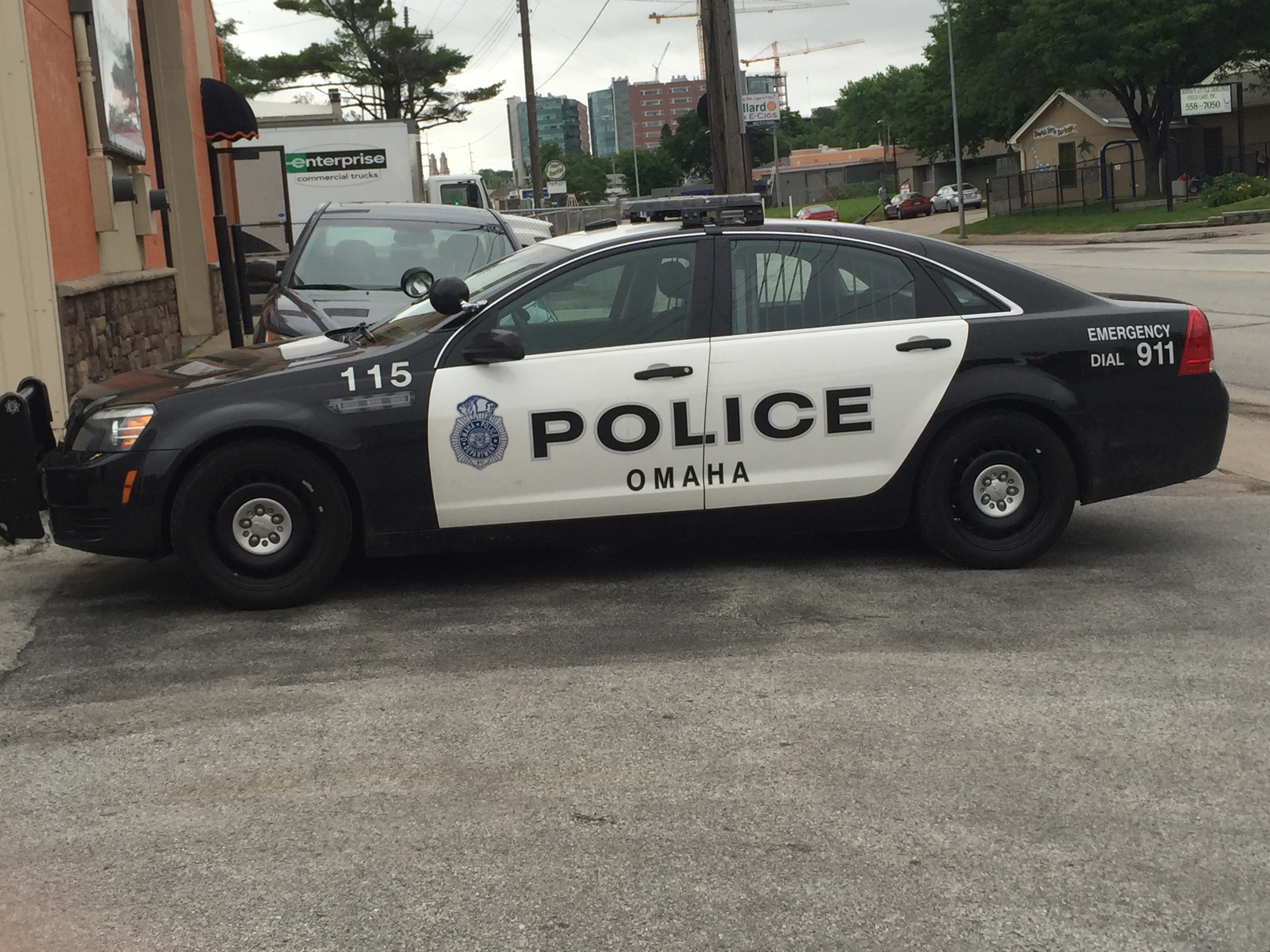
Omaha Police Department cruiser

- Air Unit
- Burglary Unit
- Auto Theft Unit
- Digital Forensics Squad
- Fraud Unit
- Pawn and Salvage
- Felony Assault Unit
- Emergency Response Unit (SWAT)
- Fugitive Squad
- Gang Unit
- Homicide Unit
- K-9 Unit
- Bomb Squad
- Internal Affairs Unit
- Narcotics Unit
- Organized Crime Squad
- Robbery Unit
- Special Victims Unit (Child Abuse/Neglect)
- Traffic Unit
- Vice Squad
- Training Unit

== Demographics ==
Breakdown of the makeup of the rank and file of OPD:

- Male: 80%
- Female: 20%
- White: 82%
- African-American/Black: 11%
- Hispanic: 5%
- Asian: 1%
- Native American:1%

== Vehicles used ==
List of the vehicles currently used in the OPD as of 2017

- Chevrolet Caprice PPV
- Ford Crown Victoria
- Ford Explorer
- Bell 505 Jet Ranger X Named ABLE 1 (Air Borne Law Enforcement)

== Line of duty deaths ==
According to ODMP, 26 officers and 1 K9 of the OPD have been killed in the line of duty.

== See also ==
- Shooting of Vivian Strong
- List of law enforcement agencies in Nebraska
- List of United States state and local law enforcement agencies
- Crime in Omaha
