= African-American history of Nebraska =

Ethnic group in Nebraska

African Americans in Nebraska
Total population
- 91,896 (2020)

Languages
- African American English, African American Vernacular English

Religion
- Historically Black Protestant

Related ethnic groups
- Black Southerners

African Americans in Nebraska or Black Nebraskans are residents of the state of Nebraska who are of African American ancestry. With history in Nebraska from the Lewis and Clark Expedition through the Civil War, emancipation, the Reconstruction era, resurgence of white supremacy with the Ku Klux Klan and Jim Crow Laws, the Civil Right movement, into current times, African Americans have contributed vastly to the economics, culture, and substance of the state.

== History ==
The history of African Americans in Nebraska includes towns and cities across the state and crosses all sectors of society, including the economy, culture, politics, education, and much more.

The first recorded Black person in Nebraska was York (1770–75 – after 1815), an explorer who was enslaved by William Clark and traveled on the Missouri River with the expedition. There are records of free Black people and enslaved Black people living at and nearby Fort Lisa, which was located north of Omaha on the Missouri near the Ponca Hills of rural Douglas County. They reportedly lived at the post and in neighboring farmsteads.

== Early Black residents ==
After the Nebraska Territory was established, enslaved people were brought during the slave trade.

The first free black person to live in Nebraska was Sally Bayne, who moved to Omaha in 1854. A clause in the original proposed Nebraska State Constitution from 1854 limited voting rights in the state to "free white males", which kept Nebraska from entering the Union for almost a year. In the 1860s, the U.S. Census showed 81 "Negroes" in Nebraska, ten of whom were accounted for as slaves. At that time, the majority of the population lived in Omaha and Nebraska City.

Some of the earliest African-American residents of Nebraska may have arrived by the Underground Railroad via a small log cabin outside of Nebraska City built by Allen Mayhew in 1855. There are several documented reports of activity on the Nebraska Underground Railroad.

There were settlements, including villages, towns and neighborhoods created by African Americans across the state. The earliest Black settlements in Nebraska were neighborhood in Omaha, Nebraska City, Brownville, and Auburn. Later, the cities of Valentine, Grand Island, North Platte, Beatrice, and Alliance all had numbers of Black people living there.

The Black population in Grand Island existed in the city since at least the 1870s, with a Black neighborhood including churches, businesses, and more. It included people who worked as cowboys, maids, chauffeurs, and other servitude positions. There were also railroad porters and others.

John Grant Pegg was the Leading Colored Republican of the Western States Meet in Conference. In 1906, he was appointed as the City Weights and Measures Inspector by J. C. Dalhman, Mayor of Omaha 1910. Pegg held the post for 10 years until his death in 1916. He encouraged and sponsored many of the black settlers who went by wagon out to Cherry County, Nebraska, to homestead benefiting from The Kincaid Homestead Act of 1904, where a black colony was established and where his brother, Charles T. Pegg, lived.

Black homesteaders tended to settle in central and western Nebraska. They formed small colonies and stayed largely self-sufficient when possible. Other substantial Black homesteading counties in Nebraska were in Dawson, Harlan, and Custer. Other rural towns with identifiable populations included Crawford, Stromsburg, and Seward. The towns of Overton, Brownlee, and DeWitty were established by Black settlers. Today, the town of DeWitty, later known as Audacious, is recognized as the longest-standing Black town in Nebraska history.

African American populations in Nebraska's two largest cities grew greatly over the decades. In smaller cities the population receded for several reasons. For instance, after living there for more than 50 years, the Black community of more than 200 residents in North Platte was violently forced to leave the city in 1929. Meanwhile, settlement in Omaha continuously grew from 1870 through 2010, when the number of Black residents started to recede in the city. Settlement in Lincoln grew continuously from its establishment into the 1950s, when it began receding. The city of Omaha and particularly the North Omaha community is largely associated with the state's Black population today, despite the once-wide-ranging presence of Black people across Nebraska.

== Politics ==
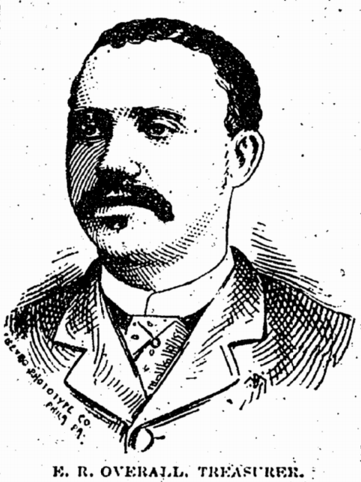

Political organizing by Black people in Nebraska began in the 1860s. Edwin R. Overall (1835–1901) was an early civil rights activist and politician in Omaha. After being an Underground Railroad conductor in Chicago, he moved to Omaha, where he led the establishment of the National Afro-American League and a Nebraska branch of the same organization. He was the first Black person in Nebraska to be nominated to the state legislature in 1890, which he lost. From the 1870s through the 1880s, political organizing among Black people in Nebraska was led by several people. In Omaha, Cyrus Bell, Dr. Stephenson, John Lewis, Edwin Overall, and Samuel Colman organized the Black community, working to support local Black newspapers and advocate for local and national improvement in rights for African Americans.

The Golden Link Literary Club was founded in Omaha in 1871 to serve as a de facto political organizing committee, with many political leaders closely associated with it. The club itself was closely associated with the St. John's A.M.E. Church. Members included Dr. W. H. C. Stephenson as president, Dr. Matthew O. Ricketts, Abraham W. Parker, W. H. Washington, Rev. R. Ricketts, Emmanuel S. Clellans, J. Johnson, C. C. Cary, and Overall's wife.. In 1882, the club celebrated the seating of John R. Lynch to a seat in the U.S. House of Representatives from Mississippi after a long legal battle.

In 1892, Dr. Matthew Ricketts was the first black person elected to serve in the Nebraska Legislature and in 1895 Silas Robbins was the first black lawyer admitted to the Nebraska State Bar Association. Since then, there have been more than 13 African American legislators in Nebraska's House.

In 1897 and 1898, Edwin Overall organized a Congress of White and Colored Americans to be held in Omaha during the Trans-Mississippi Exposition which took place from June 1 to November 1, 1898. Overall worked with Rev. Dr. John Albert Williams and Cyrus D. Bell to bring a convention of the National Colored Personal Liberty League led by Henry Clay Hawkings to Omaha August 17, 1898, during the Expo. Nebraska Governor Holcomb and Mayor Moores welcomed those in attendance, and Cyrus Bell and J. C. Parker of Omaha and D. Augustus Stroker, J. Milton Turner, and Dr. Crossland played prominent roles as well with P. G. Lowery supplying music. On August 22, the National Colored Press Association met in Omaha as well

The first State Convention of Black people ever held in Nebraska was held in 1871. In 1876, Dr. Stephenson, Edwin Overall, William R. Gamble (father of Lucy Gamble) and the Rev. W. W. H. Wilson were elected to be a delegates to the National Convention of Colored Men in Nashville on April 5, 1876, . R. D. Curry, John Lewis, Calvin Montgomery, and P. Hampten were alternates to the Nashville Convention. One of the most important issues in the meeting was the denunciation of lynchings, particularly in Louisiana and Mississippi. In May 1876, he was a delegate to the Nebraska Republican Convention.

In late 1889 and early 1890, Chicago's T. Thomas Fortune called for the organization of local leagues for the purpose of the advancement of blacks which would meet in January 1890 to form the National Afro-American League. On January 9, 1890, a meeting was held in Omaha to this effect. Overall was elected chairman of the meeting. Other leaders at the meeting were J. O. Adams, Price Saunders, E. S. Clemens, Cyrus D. Bell, W. B. Walker, Parker, Alfred S. Barnett, W. G. Woodbey, F. Lewis, Dr. Stephens, Alfonso Wilson, Fed Thomas, Silas Robbins, and Dr. Matthew Ricketts. There were disagreements over the local league's constitution. While Adams supported Overall, Ricketts, Walker, and Bell loudly opposed Overall's domination of the writing of the constitution. Ricketts initially opposed the idea that whites could be allowed in the league, fearing they could dominate it, but Walker supported that clause convincingly. There was also a debate over dues. Ricketts, Barnett, and Thomas were selected to be the local league's delegates to the national convention of the league and Silas Robbins would attend the national convention as a delegate from the Republican Colored Club. Eventually, Ricketts, A. L. Bennet, S. G. Thomas, Robbins, and Overall attended. At the national meeting, Overall served on the Committee on Credentials, Ricketts on the Committee on Permanent Organization and the executive committee, Robbins on the Address Committee, and Thomas as a Sergeant-at-arms. Back in Nebraska later that year, he was elected treasurer of the Nebraska chapter of the league. Also, he was a delegate to the Colored Men Convention of Nebraska on April 30, 1890.

The "most prominent colored citizens" of Omaha formed the Afro-American Civil Rights Club in July 1892. Seeking to influence African American voters, the club discussed methods and more.

In 1912, Rev. John Albert Williams started an effort to create the Omaha Chapter of the National Association for the Advancement of Colored People. National co-founder Mary White Ovington spoke in Omaha in 1918, and the chapter was officially started. Rev. Williams was the first president with Harrison J. Pinkett acting as executive secretary. The Hamitic League of the World was founded in Omaha in 1917 by George Wells Parker. An Afro-centric organization focused on Black history, it published a pamphlet in 1918 called Children of the Sun that was widely recognized. In the 1920s, the Baptist minister Earl Little and his wife Louise Little established an Omaha chapter of Marcus Garvey's Universal Negro Improvement Association, or UNIA. Little was renowned for preaching on street corners in the heart of the African American business district. The first chapter in the American West of the Urban League was started in Nebraska in 1927. It continues today.

=== Lynchings ===
There were several racially motivated lynchings of African Americans in Nebraska history. In 1878, a lynching occurred in Nebraska City. Two black men, Henry Jackson and Henry Martin, were convicted of the December 2, 1878 murder of a sixty-year-old white man named Charles Slocum and his wife in Nebraska City. They were sentenced to life in prison, but were hung by a mob in that city in the early morning of December 10, 1878. Other lynchings included George Smith in 1891 and Will Brown in 1919, both in Omaha; and Louis Seeman in 1927.

== Notable individuals ==
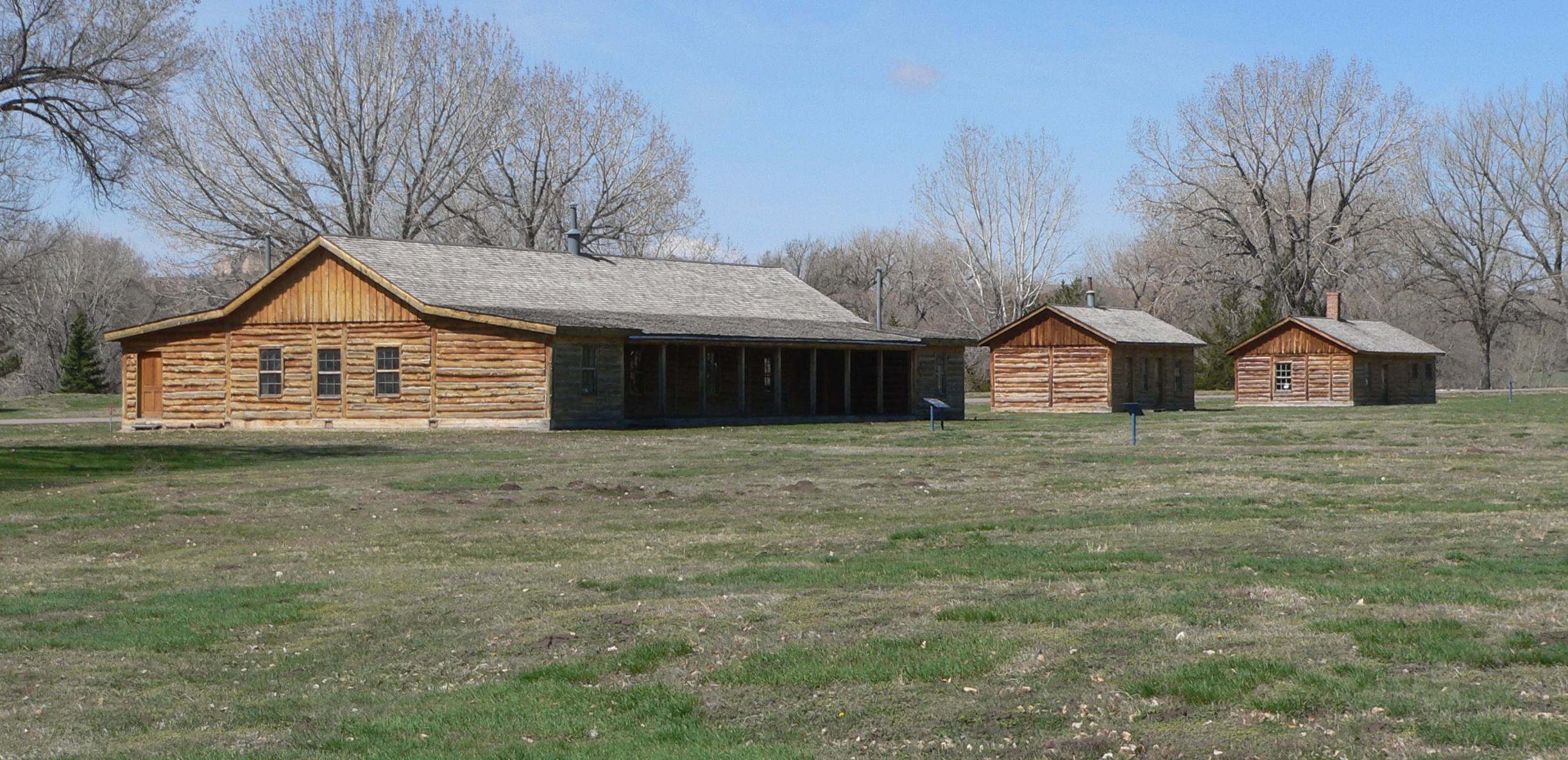

In the early history of the Nebraska, the state was home to the Buffalo Soldiers of the U.S. Army, with many stationed at Fort Robinson and others at Fort Niobrara. During this early era, there were several notable Black cowboys in Nebraska history, too, including "Big Amos" Harris and others.

Nebraska's most notable African American son is Malcolm X, who was born in 1926 in North Omaha and lived there for a short time before his family moved.

Reared in Omaha, Clarence W. Wigington was the first black architect to design a home in Nebraska as a student of Thomas Rogers Kimball. He also designed churches in Omaha.

== Current population ==
In the 2020 Census, 96,535 Nebraska residents were identified as African American (of the total 1,961,504). African Americans make up more than 10% of the population in only one county: Douglas (11.1%). African Americans in the seven counties of Douglas (64,721), Lancaster (13,759), Sarpy (7,459), Hall (1,919), Dakota (1,613), Dawson (1,210), and Buffalo (643) make up more than 94% of all African Americans in the state.

== Notable places ==
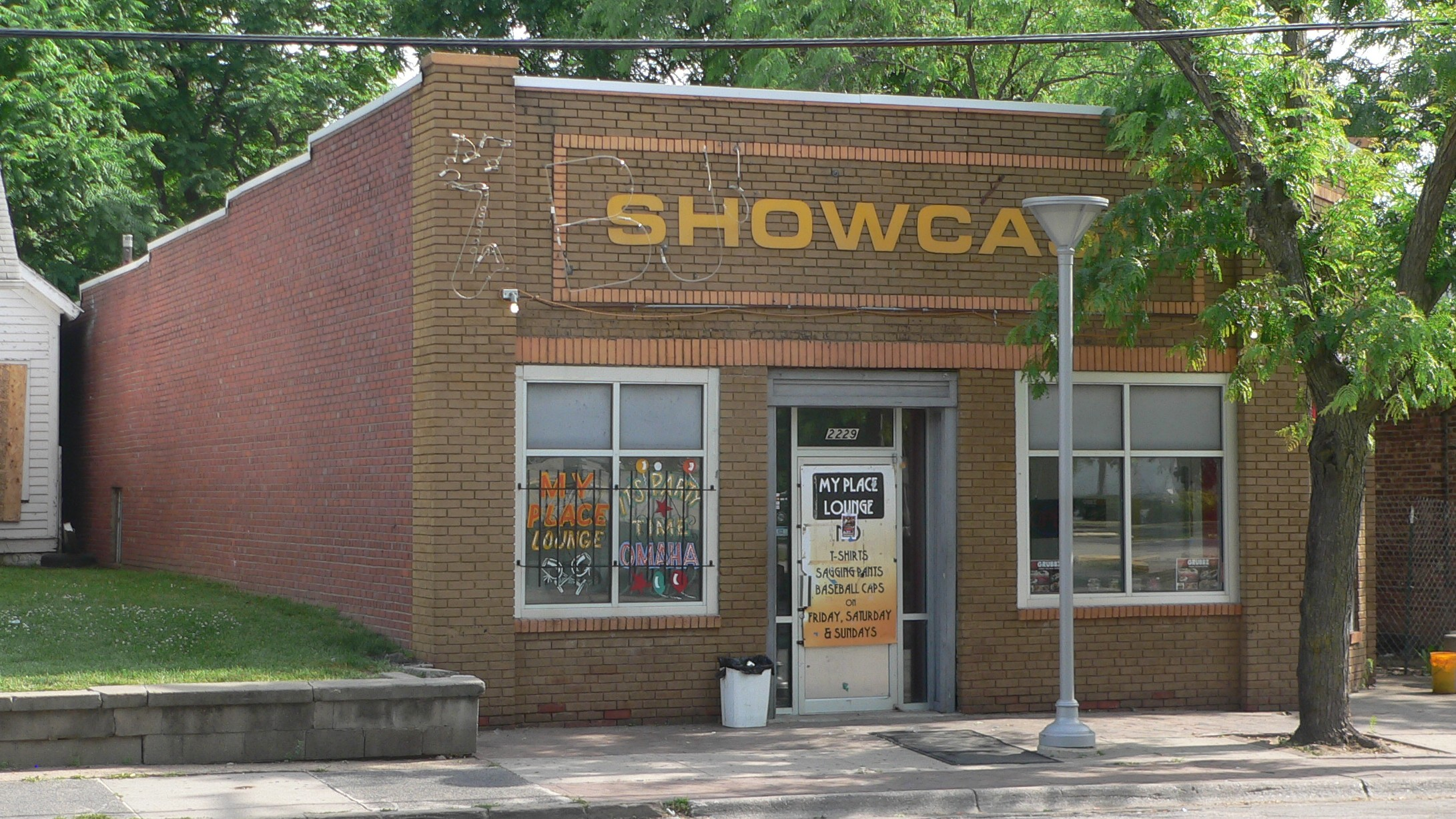

Today, there are many places associated with African American heritage across the state, with many concentrated in Omaha. One historian has identified more than 160 Black heritage sites throughout the city.

Today, one of the primary locations on the Underground Railroad in Nebraska is preserved as the Mayhew Cabin Museum. Since 2012, the National Park Service has identified more than a dozen sites in Nebraska for their "Network to Freedom" program.

There are several African American heritage sites in Grand Island, including a former community and recreation center, a former Black church, and others. According to one researcher, there are more than 150 Black burials in the Grand Island Cemetery.

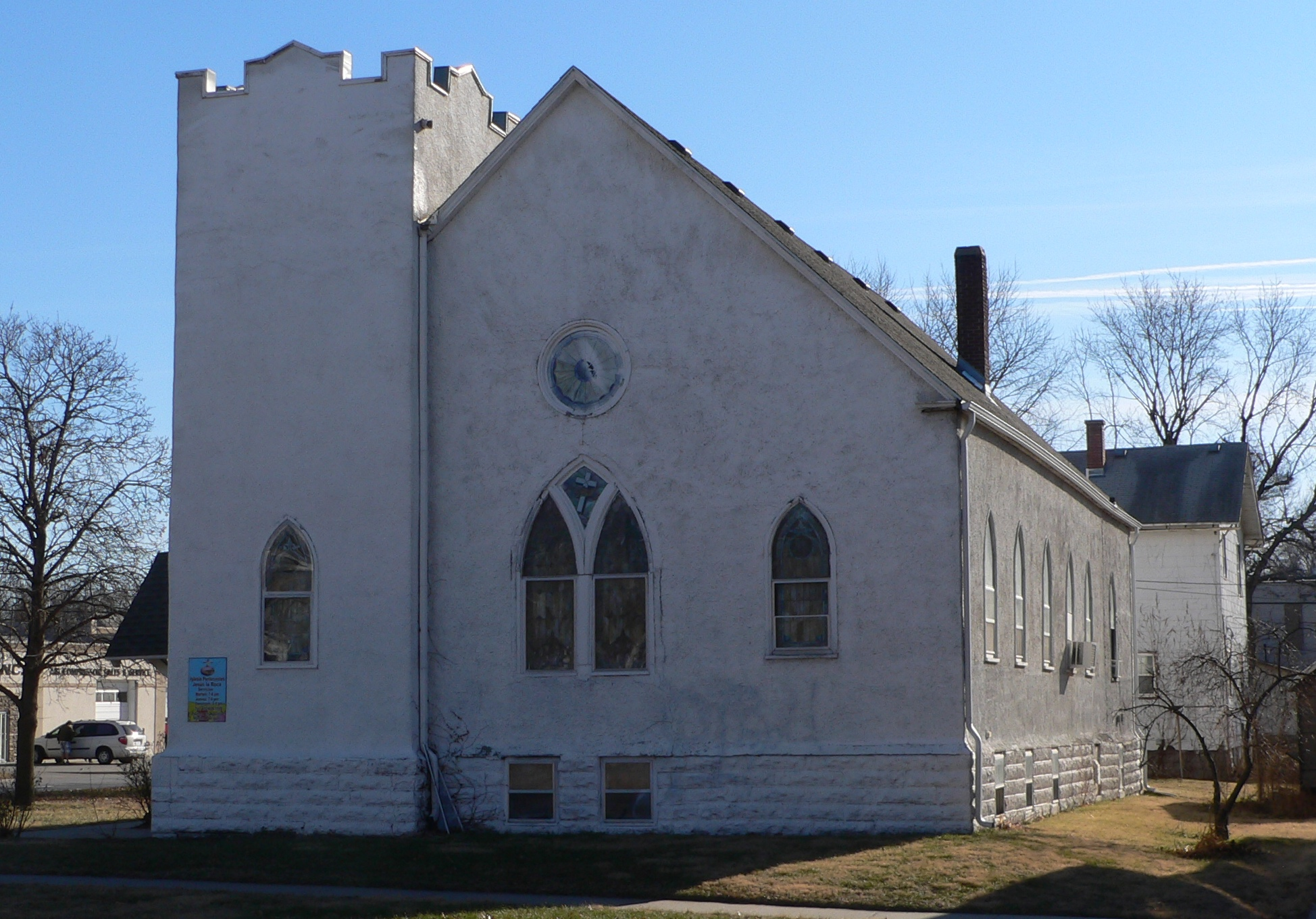

Founded in 1867, St. John's African Methodist Episcopal Church in the Near North Side neighborhood was the first church for African Americans in Nebraska. Other early Black churches were in Nebraska City and Lincoln. In Lincoln, a notable African American heritage location is Quinn Chapel African Methodist Episcopal Church and Parsonage. Built in 1905, the building was listed on the National Register of Historic Places in 1999.

The Great Plains Black History Museum is the only African American history museum in Nebraska today. According to their website, "For the past 40 years, the Great Plains Black History Museum has been an important institution dedicated to publicizing and preserving the achievements of the region's vibrant African American heritage. We welcome the African American community, regional residents and schools, and Omaha-area visitors."

== See also ==
- African Americans in Omaha, Nebraska
- History of slavery in Nebraska
- Demographics of Nebraska
- History of Nebraska
