= History of African Americans in Omaha in the 19th century =

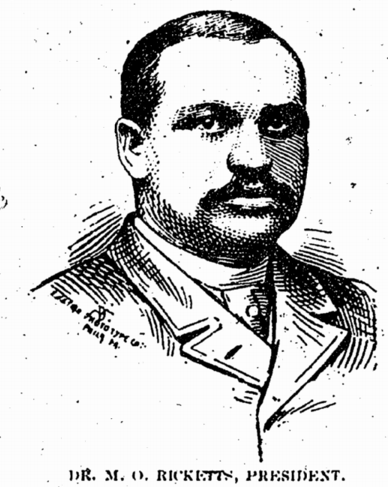
Matthew Ricketts in 1890

The history of African-Americans in Omaha in the 19th Century begins with "York", a slave belonging to William Clark of the Lewis and Clark Expedition who came through the area in 1804, before the city existed. African-Americans have lived in the Omaha area since at least 1819, when fur traders lived in the area.

After the American Civil War (1861–1865), many blacks moved to the city. They joined together, forming numerous black churches and black social and political organizations. Father John Albert Williams moved to Omaha in 1891 and became a fixture in black religious life. Omaha also produced Nebraska's first two black school teachers, Lucy Gamble and Eula Overall.

Three black newspapers were formed in the city in the last part of the century. They were founded by George F. Franklin, Thomas P. Mahammitt, and Ferdinand L. Barnett respectively. Many Omahans participated in the founding of the National Afro-American League in 1890. African-Americans also played a prominent role in the 1898 Trans-Mississippi Exposition.

The city produced some of Nebraska's most politically active African-Americans, producing nominees to stand as candidates for state legislature. The earliest such candidate stood for office in 1880. In 1890, Edwin R. Overall was accepted by a party to stand as a candidate for the legislature. Nebraska's first black state legislator, Matthew Ricketts was finally elected in 1892.

Before Omaha's African-American residents gathered in North Omaha, they lived dispersed throughout the city. In the 1860s, the U.S. Census showed 81 "Negroes" in Nebraska, ten of whom were slaves. By 1880 there were nearly 800 black residents, many recruited by Union Pacific Railroad as strikebreakers. By 1884 there three black churches had been founded. By 1900 there were 3,443 black residents, in a total city population of 102,555.

== Pre-Civil War ==
The first recorded instance of a black person in the Omaha area occurred in 1804. "York" was a slave belonging to William Clark of the Lewis and Clark Expedition. The presence of several black people, probably slaves, was recorded in the area comprising North Omaha today when Major Stephen H. Long's expedition arrived at Fort Lisa in September 1819. They reportedly lived at the post and in neighboring farmsteads.

After a short history of slavery in Nebraska, the first free black person to live in Omaha was Sally Bayne, who moved to Omaha in 1854. A clause in the original proposed Nebraska State Constitution from 1854 limited voting rights in the state to "free white males", which kept Nebraska from entering the Union for almost a year. In the 1860s, the U.S. Census showed 81 "Negroes" in Nebraska, ten of whom were accounted for as slaves. At that time, the majority of the population lived in Omaha and Nebraska City.

Some of the earliest African-American residents of the city may have arrived by the Underground Railroad via a small log cabin outside of Nebraska City built by Allen Mayhew in 1855. It is honored today as the Mayhew Cabin Museum. One report says, "Henry Daniel Smith, born in Maryland in 1835, still living in Omaha in 1913 and working at his trade of broom-maker, was one escaped slave who entered Nebraska via the Underground Railroad."

== Early culture ==
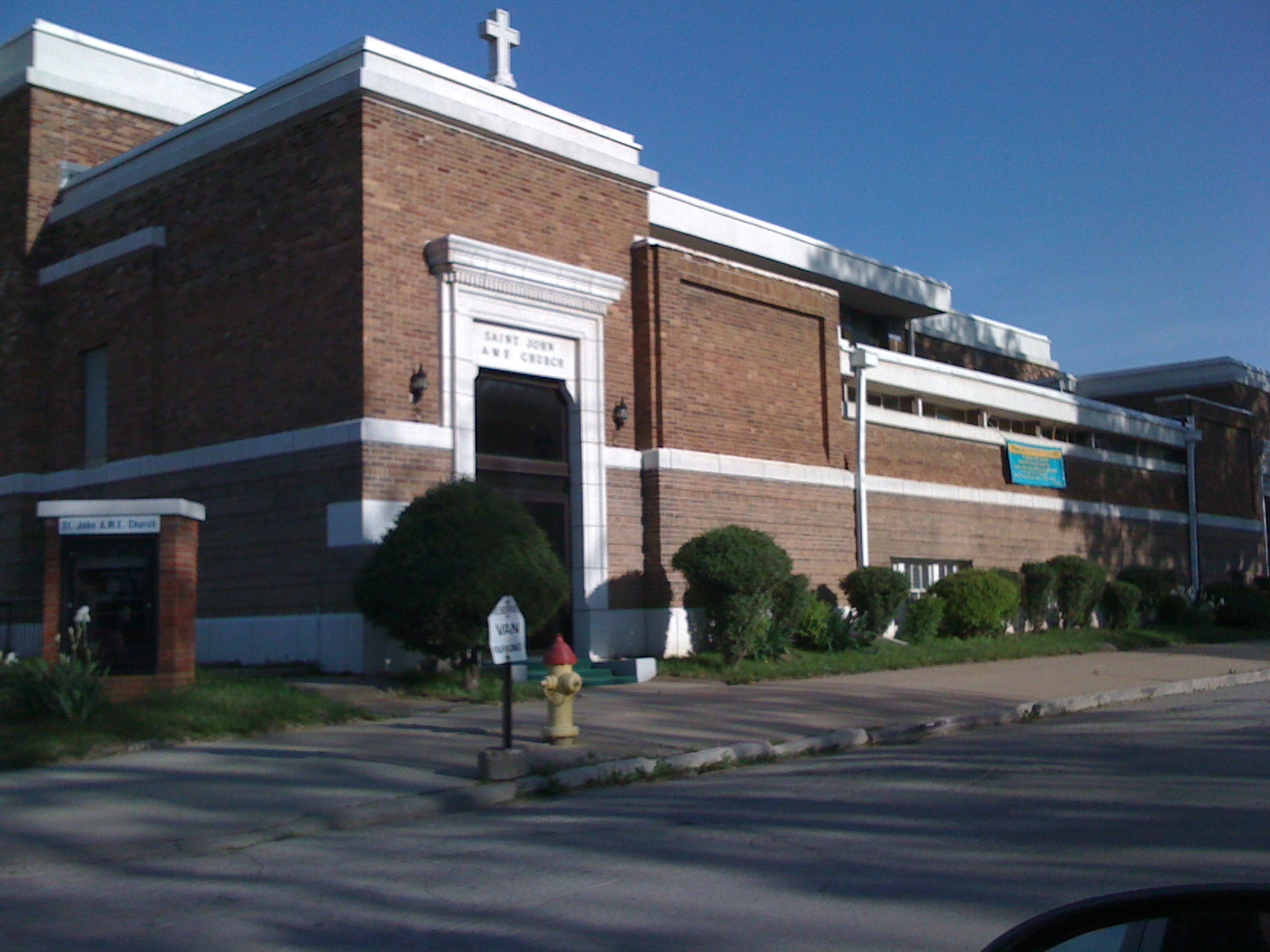
St. John's AME Church today

By 1867 enough blacks gathered in community to found St. John's African Methodist Episcopal Church in the Near North Side neighborhood. It was the first church for African Americans in Nebraska. The first recorded birth of an African American in Omaha occurred in 1872, when William Leper was born.

The Old Trinity Mission worked under the direction of Dean Millspaugh starting in late 1879, meeting in the old Cossens House and in 1881, Rev. W. Green was pastor. St. Philip's was announced to be formed out of a chapel of the old Trinity Cathedral in April, 1882, and to eventually exist as a separate structure. In 1891, Father John Albert Williams came to Omaha to serve the congregation at St. Philips.

George T. McPherson was known as Omaha's first prominent black musician, arriving in Omaha in the early 1870s and opening a music studio there. Mcpherson was called by Thomas P. Mahammitt's Enterprise "the leading pianist of the [African-American] race".

In 1879, John Lewis organized a brass band initially consisting of eleven members and instructed by professor Toozer. The band adopted the name, "Lewis' Excelsior Brass Band" and had Lewis as president, Cyrus D. Bell as secretary, Frank Bellmay as assistant secretary and D. H. Johnson as treasurer. Toozer was a drummer in the British Army Band in the Crimean War and was the leader of the Union Pacific Band, where he was an employee from 1867 to 1905. Lewis' brass band played at numerous celebrations, including the 1880 15th Amendment anniversary celebration and the August 4, 1887 anniversary of Emancipation

== Party politics ==
Black men and women quickly formed political, social, and community organizations. In June 1870, Richard D. Curry was voted in Omaha's Third Ward as Republican candidate for Trustee or Alderman, but white Omaha Republican's opposed Curry's selection and nominated someone else. This created a good deal of distrust of Republican's in Omaha by blacks. A committee of black citizens in Omaha chaired by John Lewis and with G. G. Iredell as secretary was formed to encourage blacks to distance themselves from party politics and to vote more independently. This was in particular a response to the rejection by the Republican Party of Curry's candidacy.

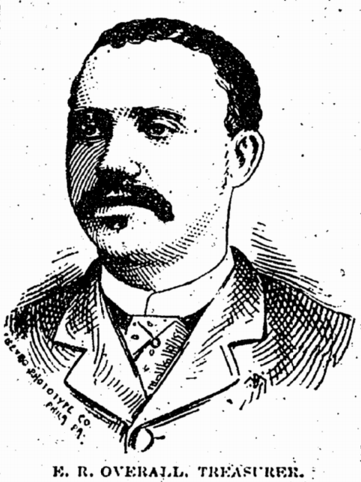
Edwin Overall in 1890

In January, 1876, Edwin R. Overall, William R. Gamble, and Rev W. H. Wilson organized a State Convention of Colored men. The convention met to discuss lynching and to select delegates for the national convention to be held in Nashville later that year. Overall, Dr. W. H. C. Stephenson, Wilson, and Gamble were selected as delegates, with Curry, John Lewis, Calvin Montgomery, and P. Hampton as alternates. Wilson served as president of the meeting, Curry, Lewis, and J. C. Boone as vice presidents, and Cyrus D. Bell as secretary. However, in February of that year, Curry attacked Edward Rosewater, then editor of the Omaha Bee for calling his saloon a "den". Curry was imprisoned for the assault and his public career came to an end

Democrat Cyrus D. Bell, an ex-slave, was proposed for city, county, legislative, or state office by the Anti-Republican Omaha Herald in 1878, although this proposal was meant to show that Republicans in the city had poor commitment to black rights in Omaha, the Democratic paper, Omaha Herald commenting that "hundreds of colored men are constantly disfranchised from holding office by the Republican party whilst casting a solid vote and giving power to that party.". Throughout his life, Bell frequently voiced his frustration at the Republican Party in Nebraska for failing to promote black candidates for elected and appointed offices, a cause in which Bell was joined by C. E. Burke

In the late 1860s, Edwin R. Overall moved from Chicago to Omaha. Overall had been working for black betterment since before the civil war, and along with Bell was frequently chosen to represent the Omaha black community. In a March 30, 1879 celebration of the anniversary of the ratification of the fifteenth amendment at the Masonic Hall, Overall and Bell spoke. Overall emphasized the ascendance of ex-confederates to federal elective office, while characteristically, Bell focused on the need for blacks to vote independently and that emancipation alone did not bring blacks to full citizenship. Other leaders in the community included Emanuel S. Clenlans, H. W. Coesley, and Gabriel Young.

In the 1870s, Omaha became a destination of the great migration, black migration to Nebraska and Kansas was a particularly noted public issue in 1879 when a large group of migrants arrived in the city.

== Republican organization ==
In spite of Bell's dissent, black Republicans in Omaha became quite organized by 1880. In August of that year, a delegation of Omaha blacks attended the state Republican convention. Also that month, a meeting of a "State Convention of Colored Americans" met, this was part of the Colored Conventions Movement and was led by Overall, Dr. W. H. C. Stephenson, James O. Adams, John R. Simpson, Peter Williams, Benjamin Fulton and Rev. E. H. Brown of Lincoln. Overall was put forward by the group as a candidate for the state legislature. That year, both Overall and Stephenson sought nomination for candidate for State Legislature but their contesting efforts divided the community and they were denied by the Republican Party.

Overall's daughters eventually became teachers in Kansas City and in Omaha (Eula was a teacher in Omaha from 1898 to 1903), but in 1880, one of them was not confirmed in her candidacy. In late October, 1882, Stephenson was endorsed by a convention of Omaha blacks to be nominated as a republican candidate for the legislature, Overall possibly declined to be considered. Overall and C. C. Cary created a group called the Workingmen's Central Committee where Overall was endorsed for this nomination. Cyrus D. Bell felt that this was irregular and protested that Overall was achieving his nomination by unfair methods. Overall was selected at the first State Convention of blacks ever held in Nebraska to be a delegate to the National Convention of Colored Men in Nashville on April 5, along with Dr. W. H. C. Stephenson, William R. Gamble (father of Lucy Gamble, who was Omaha's first black teacher, teaching from 1895 to 1901), and the Rev. W. W. H. Wilson W. G. Robinson (Nebraska City), Major Moore (Lincoln), and W. R. Gamble (Omaha) were elected as delegates to the National Convention of Colored Men, at Louisville, Ky., September 24, 1883,"

In the 1880s, Overall became active in organized labor. He joined the Knights of Labor, and led black organized labor groups in the city. In 1890, Overall finally gained the Republican nomination for the state legislature and received the endorsement of the labor party, but he lost the election. The local black press believed that if white Republican's in his district had voted for him, he would have been elected, and thus it was believed his loss resulted from racist voting by Omaha Republicans. In 1893, as a Populist candidate on a pro-labor platform, Overall ran for a position on the Omaha City Council.

== Journalism ==
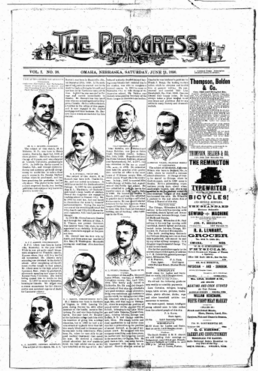
Cover of The Progress, June 21, 1890

The black community created a number of newspapers. The first was the Progress, established in 1889 by Ferdinand L. Barnett and contributed to by his brother, Alfred S. Barnett. Cyrus D. Bell established the Afro-American Sentinel in 1892. In 1893 George F. Franklin started publishing the Enterprise, later published by Thomas P. Mahammitt. It was the longest lived of any of the early African American newspapers published in Omaha.

The Sentinel was noted in its pro-Democratic stance in contrast to the Republican Progress and Enterprise, and the three papers became rivals. An example of their difference occurred in 1895 in the wake of Booker T. Washington's Atlanta Compromise Speech. Barnett's Progress opposed any sort of compromise, Franklin's Enterprise supported Washington's leadership in making a compromise, while Bell's Sentinel strongly endorsed Washington's position.

== Afro-American League ==
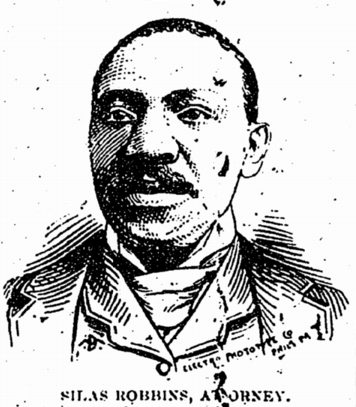
Silas Robbins in 1890

In late 1889 and early 1890, Chicago's T. Thomas Fortune called for the organization of local leagues for the purpose of the advancement of blacks which would meet in January 1890 to form the National Afro-American League. On January 9, 1890, a meeting was held in Omaha to this effect. Overall was elected chairman of the meeting. There was a disagreement over the local league's constitution. While Adams supported Overall, Matthew O. Ricketts, Walker, and Bell loudly opposed Overall's domination of the writing of the constitution. Ricketts initially opposed the idea that whites could be allowed in the league, fearing they could dominate it, but Walker supported that clause convincingly. There was also a debate over dues. Ricketts, A. S. Barnett, and Thomas were selected to be the local league's delegates to the national convention of the league and Silas Robbins would attend the national convention as a delegate from the Republican Colored Club. Eventually, Ricketts, A. L. Bennet, S. G. Thomas, Robbins, and Overall attended. At the meeting, Overall served on the Committee on Credentials, Ricketts on the Committee on Permanent Organization and the Executive Committee, Robbins on the Address Committee, and A. Thomas as a Sergeant-at-arms.

At the meeting, Ricketts gave a noted speech, saying: "The use of which has been made of the Afro-American voter by all political parties has been proverbial. We have helped by our efforts to carry men into power who, when secure in the results of our efforts, have done nothing for us. I am reminded of the old colored man who went to heaven's gate and asked for admittance. 'Are you afoot or horseback,' asked St. Peter. 'I'm afoot.' said the suppliant. 'Then you can't come in,' said the doorkeeper. The Afro-American went back down the hill and met the Honorable 'Billy' Mahone who said he could arrange it all right. 'You go down on your hands and knees and I'll ride up to the door and then we'll both go in,' he said to the colored brother. So they came to the gate. To the question of the saint, Mahone said he was riding and not afoot. 'Well,' said St. Peter, 'tie your horse outside and come in.' Gentlemen, we have been hewers of wood for years, but we haven't been near the fire; we have been drawers of water, but have gone thirsty. Let us be of no party but the Afro-American party."

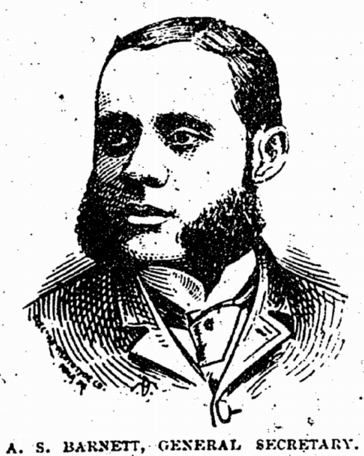
Alfred S. Barnett in 1890

April 30, 1890, Omaha leaders called for a meeting of black Nebraskans to discuss issues relating to equal rights, to form a permanent state league, and to support black people seeking to move to Nebraska to purchase homes and farms. The meeting was called by A. S. Barnett (Omaha), M. O. Ricketts (Omaha), H. Curry (Omaha), G. F. Franklin (Omaha), B. F. C. Albert (Linsoln), Edward Jones (Columbus), Jerry Smith (Blair), J. S. Shannon (Blair), J. C. Boone (Plattsmouth), George W. Slater Sr (Aurora), Benjamine Snell (Chadron), R. E. Allen (Overton), Abe Williams (Schuyler), and J. S. Webb (Ansley). Among the issues discussed at this State Afro-American League meeting were segregated restaurants, segregated barbers, and segregated public houses. Southern oppression and northern caste were denounced. An important division at the meeting was the call made by Cyrus Bell and supported by Matthew Ricketts that blacks no longer give their full support to the Republicans, but, rather vote their conscience. The motion was especially disliked by delegates who did not live in Omaha

== Early successes ==
Violence against blacks was a great cause for concern in the community and was a frequent topic at meetings and from the pulpit. In 1891, George Smith (aka Joe Coe, a convicted rapist) was lynched in Omaha and in 1894, Sam Payne (convicted murderer of Maud Rubel) was threatened with lynching. Local leaders James Alexander, Rickets, Richard Gamble, and Bell were outspoken in condemnation of the lynching in Omaha and Payne's safety was assured.

On September 20, 1894, Ida B. Wells came to speak and organize a branch of the anti-lynching league in Omaha. In December 1894 the Anti-Lynching league was founded with John Albert Williams as president. In that role, Williams frequently sought to calm Omaha's black community in the face of racial tensions, such as during the Spring Valley, Illinois black-Italian labor war in August 1895.

In 1892, Dr. Matthew Ricketts was the first black person elected to serve in the Nebraska Legislature, serving two consecutive terms. In 1895 Silas Robbins was the first black lawyer admitted to the Nebraska State Bar Association.

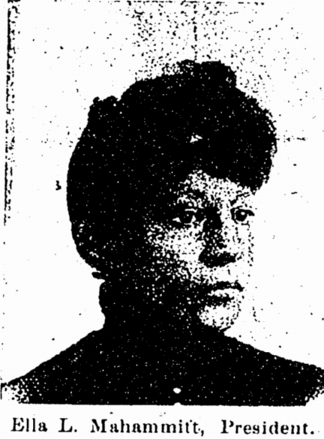
Ella Mahammitt in 1896

Another division in the community occurred in 1895, when G. F. Franklin was appointed Inspector of Weights and Measures with the support of the Thomas and Ella Mahammitt and against the protest of Bell. A contributing cause was a dispute involving money in a social club of which Franklin and Bell were both members.

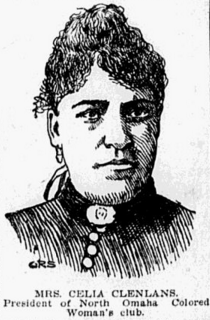
Ophelia Clenlans

Later in 1895, Ella Mahammitt (wife of Thomas P. Mahammitt) traveled to The First National Conference of the Colored Women of America held on August 26, 1895, in Berkeley Hall, Boston, Massachusetts on July 29–31, 1895, called by the Woman's Era Club of Boston. The focus of the convention was the education of black children and the group named themselves the National Federation of Afro-American Women. She was elected as Vice-President representing the West at the meeting. At the meeting, Mahammitt worked closely with Margaret James Murray, wife of Booker T. Washington. In 1896 was a committee member of the successor organization, the National Association of Colored Women under president Mary Church Terrell. Other female African American leaders in Omaha included Ophelia Clenlans, Nettie Johnson, Laura Craig, Clara Franklin, Lucy Gamble, and Comfort Baker. Along with Mahammitt, Clenlans, Johnson, Craig, and Franklin were officers of Mahammitt's Omaha Colored Women's Club in 1896. All seven women contributed to an Easter edition of The Enterprise in 1896 which was entirely produced by women.

== Trans-Mississippi Exhibition ==
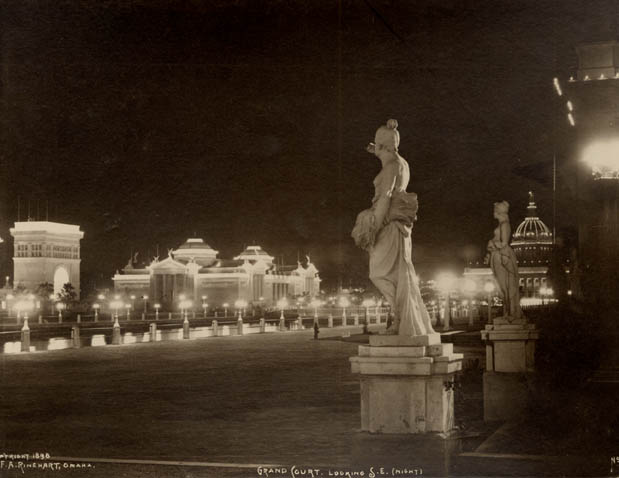
Night view of the Grand Court of the Trans-Mississippi Exhibition, Omaha. Photograph by Frank Rinehart, 1898.

In the late 1890s, Omaha blacks sought to use the 1897 Tennessee Centennial and International Exposition in Nashville and the 1898 Trans-Mississippi Exposition in Omaha to bring attention to the role of African Americans in Nebraska. J. C. C. Owens, M. O. Ricketts, T. P. Mahammitt, Franklin, George E. Collins, John Wright, J. W. Long all played key roles in organizing the initial efforts. They succeeded in sending a delegation to the Tennessee exhibition, and in securing central presence of African-Americans in the Omaha exhibition. Edwin R. Overall, John Albert Williams, and Cyrus D. Bell worked to bring a convention of the National Colored Personal Liberty League led by Henry Clay Hawkings to Omaha August 17, 1898 during the Trans-Mississippi Exposition., and there was a "Congress of Representatives of White and Colored Americans" and a meeting of the National Colored Press Association on August 22 and a meeting of the Western Negro Press Association. A the meeting of the Western Negro Press Association, John Albert Williams was selected first vice president and Bell was selected treasurer

The relationship between erstwhile political allies G. F. Franklin, F. L. Barnett, M. F. Singleton, and M. O. Ricketts fractured in the buildup to the expositions over the lack of inclusion of blacks in the city's organizational ranks. In The Progress, Barnett considered Singleton and Franklin's support for the expositions hypocritical, as Franklin was slow in paying his stock subscription to the exposition and did not press enough for employment of blacks in the build up to the exposition. Franklin countered that Matthew Ricketts, who was a member of the state house of representatives, was not doing enough to push for black employment in government positions, and that The Progress should question its support for Ricketts. In The Sentinel, Cyrus D. Bell, Omaha's pre-eminent black Democrat, felt that Ricketts' greed for power was at the root of the problem and was critical of Franklin as well

== Notable people ==
Some of the notable figures in Omaha's African American community in the 19th century included the following.

Name	Role(s)	Birth/Death
York	A slave belonging to William Clark of the Lewis and Clark Expedition; he was the first recorded Black person in the Omaha area in 1804.	(1770–1775 – after 1815)
Dr. Matthew O. Ricketts	Nebraska's first Black state legislator, elected in 1892; he was also a physician and a prominent orator in the National Afro-American League.	(April 3, 1858 – January 3, 1917)
Father John Albert Williams	A priest who moved to Omaha in 1891 to serve St. Philip's Episcopal Church who was a fixture in religious life and a journalist who served as vice president of the Western Negro Press Association. He was also the founder of The Monitor newspaper.	(February 28, 1866 – February 4, 1933)
Lucy Gamble	One of Nebraska's first two Black school teachers, teaching from 1895 to 1901; she was the daughter of William R. Gamble.	(August 9, 1875 – July 23, 1958)
Eula Overall	One of Nebraska's first two Black school teachers, teaching in Omaha from 1898 to 1903; she was the daughter of Edwin R. Overall.	
George F. Franklin	Founder of The Enterprise newspaper in 1893.	(February 1852 – 1901)
Thomas P. Mahammitt	Publisher of The Enterprise and a key organizer for African American events during the Trans-Mississippi Exposition.	(August 1862 – March 28, 1950)
Ferdinand L. Barnett	Founder of Omaha's first African American newspaper, The Progress, in 1889.	(July 1854 – July 18, 1932)
Edwin R. Overall	A prominent political leader, abolitionist, and organizer who stood as a candidate for the state legislature in 1890 and served as a mail clerk starting in 1869.	(August 25, 1835 – July 31, 1901)
Sally Bayne	The first free Black person to live in Omaha, arriving in 1854.	
Henry Daniel Smith	An escaped slave who entered Nebraska via the Underground Railroad and worked as a broom-maker in Omaha.	(1835-??)
William Leper	Recorded as the first birth of an African American in Omaha.	(1872-??)
George T. McPherson	Omaha's first prominent Black musician and pianist, arriving in the early 1870s.	
John Lewis	President of "Lewis' Excelsior Brass Band" (organized in 1879) and chairman of a committee formed in 1870 to encourage independent voting.	
Cyrus D. Bell	An ex-slave and Democrat who established the Afro-American Sentinel in 1892; he was a frequent speaker and secretary for various conventions.	(August 1848 - October 21, 1925)
Richard D. Curry	A Civil War veteran and Republican candidate for Alderman in 1870 whose rejection by white Republicans led to community distrust; his public career ended after an assault on Edward Rosewater in 1876.	
William R. Gamble	Organizer of the 1876 State Convention of Colored Men and a delegate to several national conventions.	
Silas Robbins	An attorney and delegate from the Republican Colored Club to the National Afro-American League in 1890.	(February 14, 1857 – September 11, 1916)
Alfred S. Barnett	Contributor to The Progress newspaper.	(December 27, 1858 – aft. 1905)
James O. Adams	A local leader involved in the National Afro-American League and the Republican party.	
Dr. W. H. C. Stephenson	A physician and active participant in state and national conventions during the 1870s and 1880s.	(c.1825 – April 6, 1899)
Rev. W. H. Wilson	President of the 1876 State Convention of Colored men and a delegate to national conventions.	
John R. Simpson	A delegate for the sixth ward to the state Republican convention in 1880.	
Emanuel S. Clenlans	A delegate for the sixth ward to the 1880 state Republican convention.	(born c. 1841)

== See also ==
- African Americans in Omaha, Nebraska
