= Edwin R. Overall =

American abolitionist and civil rights activist (1835–1901)

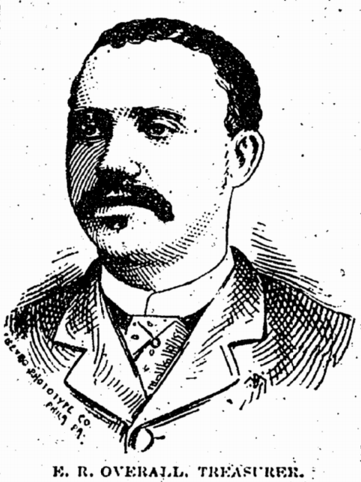
- Phototype from the Progress, June 21, 1890
- Born: August 25, 1835; Saint Charles County, Missouri, U.S.
- Died: July 31, 1901 (aged 65); Omaha, Nebraska, U.S.
- Occupations: Abolitionist civil rights activist mail carrier politician
- Political party: Republican, Populist
- Spouses: Mary L. Blackburn (m. 1859, died) Mary E. Washington (m. 1887)
- Children: 7

Edwin R. Overall aka Edwin R. Williams (August 25, 1835 – July 31, 1901) was an abolitionist, civil rights activist, civil servant, and politician in Chicago and Omaha. In the 1850s and 1860s, he was involved in abolition and Underground Railroad activities headed at Chicago's Quinn Chapel AME Church. During the U. S. Civil War, he recruited blacks in Chicago to join the Union Army. After the war, he moved to Omaha, where he was involved in the founding of the National Afro-American League and a local branch of the same. He was the first black in Nebraska to be nominated to the state legislature in 1890. He lost the election, but in 1892, his friend Matthew O. Ricketts became the first African-American elected to the Nebraska legislature. He was also a leader in Omaha organized labor.

== Life ==
Edwin was born into slavery in Saint Charles County, Missouri, August 25, 1835 to a man with the last name of Overall. Edwin was probably born to a slave woman with the last name of Williams and for the first part of his life used Williams as his last name. As a boy, he worked on a farm, and he moved to Chicago about 1855 where he attended the Jones School. In 1861 he read law in Chicago, but discontinued for financial reasons. He moved to Omaha in the late 1860s.

In 1859 he married M. L. Blackburn of Cincinnati. Overall had many children: Ida, Grace Victoria, Florence Esther, Norman Murray, Maud, Guy, and Eula. Eula served as a teacher in the Omaha Public Schools from 1898 to 1903, making her Omaha's second black teacher following Lucy Gamble. Victoria, Florence, and Ida lived in Kansas City, Missouri where they, too, served as teachers. One of his daughters was a candidate for teacher in the Omaha Public Schools in 1880 but was denied by the board, likely due to her race. After the death of his first wife, he married Mary E. Washington about 1887.

In 1875, his father died and Overall was awarded his father's fortune. It was at this time he changed his name from Williams to Overall. With this inheritance and his own businesses he became one of Omaha's wealthiest citizens. He invested widely in real estate and was a director and later president of the Missouri and Nebraska Coal Mining Company. The company's mine was sixteen miles from Plattsmouth.

Overall's work brought him into contact with many friends who visited him in Omaha, including Paul Lawrence Dunbar. His close relationship with the city government and military experience placed him on the reception committee for the visit of Ulysses S. Grant to Omaha in 1879. He was also closely aligned with Andrew and Edward Rosewater in various Omaha civic affairs, as well as with Mayors Bemis and Moores.

He died July 31, 1901, of Bright's disease. His services were at St. Philip the Deacon and were said by his friend, Father John Albert Williams, and he was buried at Prospect Hill Cemetery.

== Civil War ==
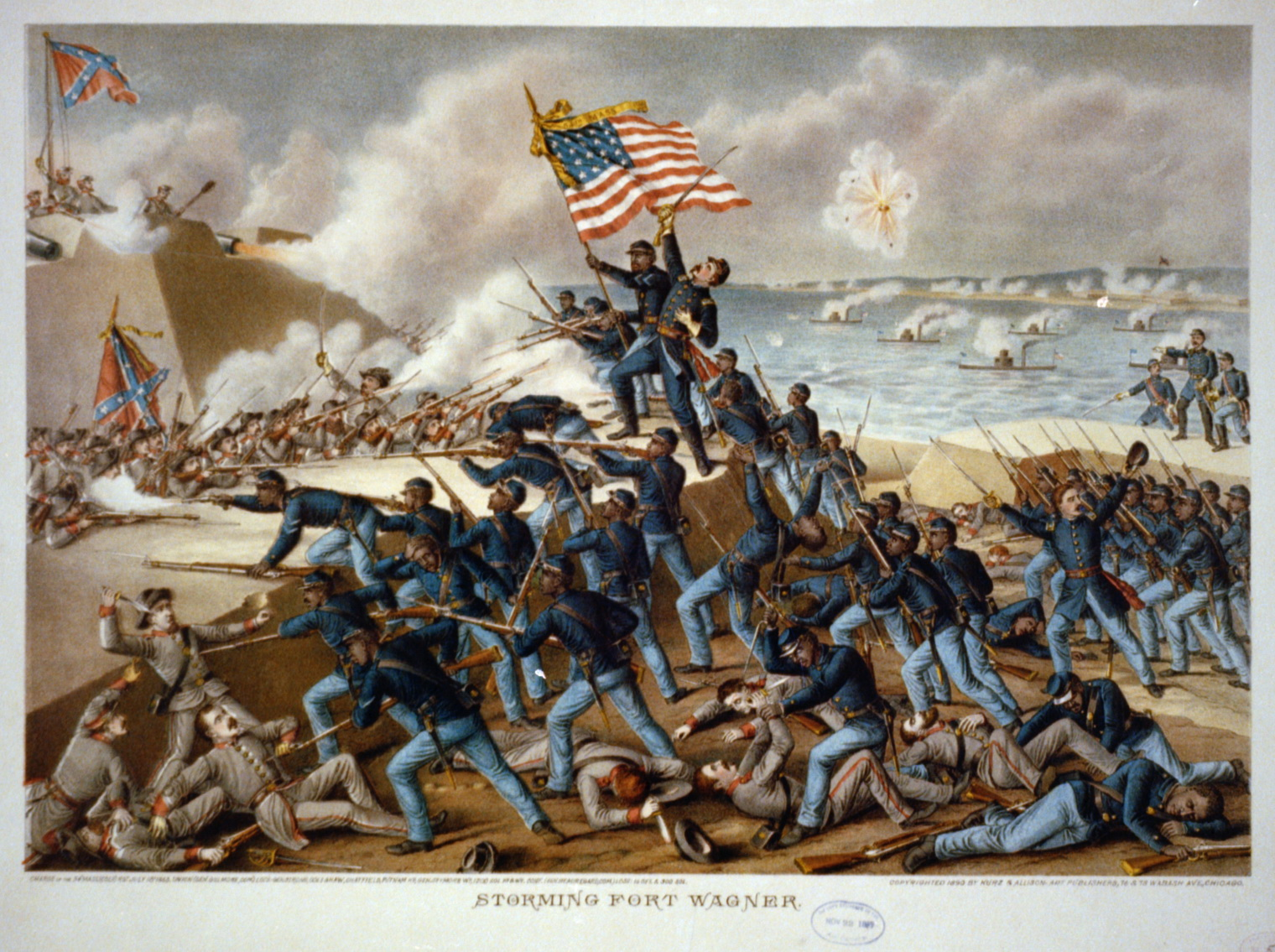
The 54th Massachusetts at the Second Battle of Fort Wagner, July 18, 1863

At the age of twenty he moved to Chicago, where he was an outspoken abolitionist. He joined the Quinn Chapel AME church, where he became a member of the chapel's Anti-Slavery association and was involved in the Underground Railroad. He also was interested in the education of blacks. In the early 1860s, he was superintendent of the Bethel Sunday School and was an officer of the Chicago Sunday School Union He was also president of the Colored Young Men's Literary Association which met at the Quinn Chapel.

At the outset of the U. S. Civil War, Williams pressed for the inclusion of blacks in the Union Army. On April 23, 1861, Williams chaired a meeting of blacks in Chicago with R. C. Warius as secretary to call for the raising of black troops and the repeal of black laws and resolved to raise money for Chicago soldiers and their families.

When the governor of Massachusetts obtained permission to enlist blacks to fight in the civil war in early 1863, Overall was appointed superintendent of the western divisions. He served as recruiting officer for the 54th and 55th Massachusetts Infantry, including Sergeants John H. W. Collins and Joseph D. Wilson of Company H in the 54th, and offered his services to Illinois governor Richard Yates to raise a company to join the United States Colored Troops.

On April 27, 1863, Williams played a prominent role in an assembly of African-Americans at Quinn's Chapel in Chicago organizing a call to arms by blacks in Chicago and led by Joseph Stanley (president), John Jones, Theodore Sterrett, Rev A. Hall, Rev. E. McTosh (vice presidents), Lewis B. White, and John Byrd (Secretaries). Williams was a member of the resolutions committee along with H. J. Maxwell, Jno. E. Carter, R. M. Hancock, and William R. Bonner, and spoke to the organization of his own desire and the desire he saw in many African-Americans to fight for the Union. At the end of the meeting, Williams was appointed to the committee on recruiting along with H. J. Maxwell, L. Isbell, J. Early, and E. H. Walker.

== Post-War Chicago ==
After the war, Overall continued to work for the advancement of blacks and of civil rights. On October 16, 1866, he served as chairman of the Chicago delegation to a "convention of the colored Americans of the State of Illinois" at Galesburg, Illinois. The convention took place concurrently with the Convention of Men of Color in Albany, New York, and the two conventions communicated by telegram during their assemblies. The convention sought to discuss the educational, political, and legal limitations faced by blacks in Illinois and to express the desire of blacks to be given full political rights as citizens, particularly the right to vote and to participate fully in legal proceedings. Williams, along with Lewis B. White and George L. Thomas, were the Corresponding Committee making the initial call to the meeting. William Johnson was named president of the convention and Williams was on the Ways and Means committee, the Committee on Resolutions, the Committee on Suffrage, and the Publishing Committee to publish the proceedings of the convention. In the Committee on Resolutions, under chairman Joseph Stanley, spoke for the rights of blacks to vote, to form stock associations, to attend public schools, and to purchase land. Williams was chairman of the Committee on Suffrage, who recommended the creation of a State Central Suffrage Committee to press for black electoral rights.

== Civil rights in Omaha ==
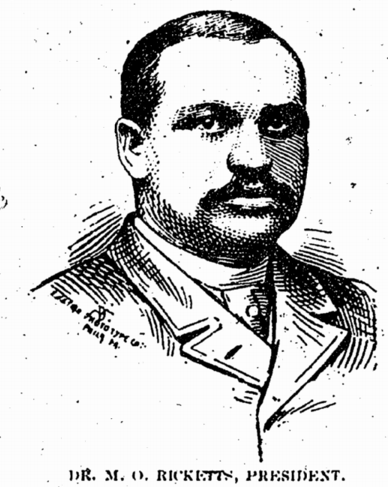
Matthew Rickets in 1890

In the late 1860s Overall moved to Omaha, where he continued his civil rights activism and civic involvement. When he arrived, Omaha schools were segregated and education for blacks was very poor. In 1868, he led in a fight to end the segregation and in 1869 the system ended. In 1869 he received an appointment to the office of general delivery clerk for the post office by J. H. Hellum, making him the first black mail carrier in the state and the only black man to hold a government position in Nebraska until the 1880s. Overall briefly resigned from the post in 1879 to focus on his business activities, but soon was reinstated and continued to work for the postal service until two weeks before his death.

In 1871, he organized the first literary society in Omaha, then known as the Progressive Age Association. Overall helped found the successor group, the Golden Link Literary club in Omaha closely associated with the A.M.E. Church. The club's meetings became an important gathering place for Omaha African Americans. In 1882, the club celebrated the seating of John R. Lynch to a seat in the U.S. House of Representatives from Mississippi after a long legal battle. Members included Dr. W. H. C. Stephenson (then president), M. O. Ricketts, Abraham W. Parker, W. H. Washington, Rev. R. Ricketts, E. S. Clellans, J. Johnson, C. C. Cary, and Overall's wife.

In Omaha, he worked closely with Cyrus D. Bell, Dr. Stephenson, John Lewis, and Samuel Colman in organizing the city's blacks; working to support black newspapers and local and national improvement in black rights. He was selected at the first State Convention of blacks ever held in Nebraska to be a delegate to the National Convention of Colored Men in Nashville on April 5, 1876, along with Dr. W. H. C. Stephenson, William R. Gamble (father of Lucy Gamble) and the Rev. W. W. H. Wilson. R. D. Curry, John Lewis, Calvin Montgomery, and P. Hampten were alternates to the Nashville Convention. One of the most important issues in the meeting was the denunciation of lynchings, particularly in Louisiana and Mississippi. In May 1876, he was a delegate to the Nebraska Republican Convention.

=== Afro-American League ===
In late 1889 and early 1890, Chicago's T. Thomas Fortune called for the organization of local leagues for the purpose of the advancement of blacks which would meet in January 1890 to form the National Afro-American League. On January 9, 1890, a meeting was held in Omaha to this effect. Overall was elected chairman of the meeting. Other leaders at the meeting were J. O. Adams, Price Saunders, E. S. Clemens, Cyrus D. Bell, W. B. Walker, Parker, Alfred S. Barnett, W. G. Woodbey, F. Lewis, Dr. Stephens, Alfonso Wilson, Fed Thomas, Silas Robbins, and Dr. Matthew Ricketts. There were disagreements over the local league's constitution. While Adams supported Overall, Ricketts, Walker, and Bell loudly opposed Overall's domination of the writing of the constitution. Ricketts initially opposed the idea that whites could be allowed in the league, fearing they could dominate it, but Walker supported that clause convincingly. There was also a debate over dues. Ricketts, Barnett, and Thomas were selected to be the local league's delegates to the national convention of the league and Silas Robbins would attend the national convention as a delegate from the Republican Colored Club. Eventually, Ricketts, A. L. Bennet, S. G. Thomas, Robbins, and Overall attended. At the national meeting, Overall served on the Committee on Credentials, Ricketts on the Committee on Permanent Organization and the executive committee, Robbins on the Address Committee, and Thomas as a Sergeant-at-arms. Back in Nebraska later that year, he was elected treasurer of the Nebraska chapter of the league Also, he was a delegate to the Colored Men Convention of Nebraska on April 30, 1890.

=== Omaha's Trans-Mississippi and International Exposition ===
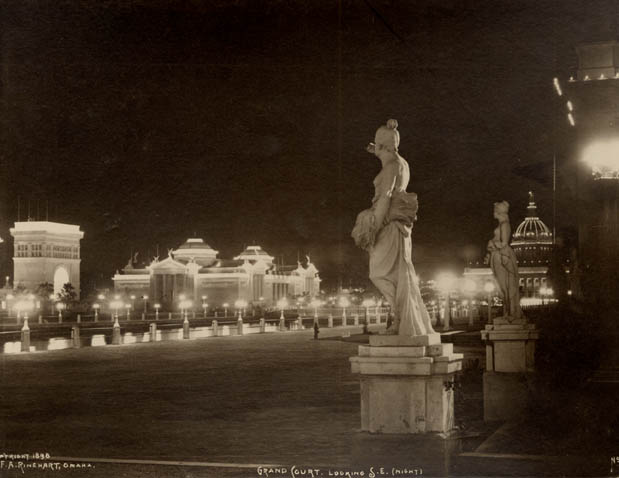
Night view of the Grand Court. Photograph by Frank Rinehart, 1898.

In 1897 and 1898, Overall organized a Congress of White and Colored Americans to be held in Omaha during the Trans-Mississippi Exposition which took place from June 1 to November 1, 1898. Overall worked with John Albert Williams and Cyrus D. Bell to bring a convention of the National Colored Personal Liberty League led by Henry Clay Hawkings to Omaha August 17, 1898 during the Expo. Governor Holcomb and Mayor Moores welcomed those in attendance, and Cyrus Bell and J. C. Parker of Omaha and D. Augustus Stroker, J. Milton Turner, and Dr. Crossland played prominent roles as well with P. G. Lowery supplying music. On August 22, the National Colored Press Association met in Omaha as well

== Electoral politics and organized labor ==
In 1880, he was chairman of the colored Campaign Club in Omaha, and along with Dr. W. H. C. Stephenson, James O. Adams, John R. Simpson, and Peter Williams organized an effort to organize black's in Nebraska as a firm voting block and to express the power of the block by enumerating both urban and rural blacks in the state. Later that year Stephenson and Overall sought selection at a convention of black Republicans to be put forward for the state legislature. At the meeting, Overall eventually received unanimous endorsement, but he was not selected to run by the party. In 1882 Overall again competed with Stephenson for the nomination as the republican candidate for the state legislature.

In the 1880s, he became active in organized labor. He joined the Knights of Labor, a labor organization in the late 1800s, and in 1895 was treasurer of the Nebraska State Federation of Labor under president George F. Daggett.

In 1890, he finally gained the Republican nomination for the state legislature and received the endorsement of the labor party, but he lost the election. The local black press believed that if white Republicans in his district had voted for him, he would have been elected, and thus it was believed his loss resulted from racist voting by Omaha Republicans. In 1893, as a Populist candidate on a pro-labor platform, Overall ran for a position on the Omaha City Council.

On May 28, 1898, Overall attended a meeting of the National Federation of Colored Labor of the United States, where he was elected general statistician. Overall's old friend from Chicago, John G. Jones, was elected president. On July 4, 1898, he attended a meeting of the National Colored Soldiers and Sailors Association of the United States where he was elected to serve as assistant grand auditor to grand auditor George E. Taylor again with John G. Jones president. This society sought to erect a monument in Washington, D.C., to honor black soldiers in the Civil War and the Spanish–American War.

== See also ==
- History of African Americans in Omaha in the 19th century
- History of North Omaha, Nebraska
- History of slavery in Nebraska
- African Americans History of Nebraska
