= William Gamble =

William Gamble may refer to:

- William Gamble (general) (1818–1866), U.S. Army cavalry officer who fought at the Battle of Gettysburg
- William Gamble (business) (1805–1881), Canadian merchant, miller, and pioneer
- William R. Gamble (1850–1910), civil rights activist and barber in Nebraska
- William Gamble (cricketer) (1798–1855), English cricketer
- William Gamble of Procter and Gamble, son of James Gamble, co-founder of Procter and Gamble

== See also ==
- William Gambel (1823–1849), U.S. naturalist and collector
