= Cyrus D. Bell =

American journalist

- Born: Cyrus Dicks Bell; August , 1848; Mississippi, U.S.
- Died: October 21, 1925 (aged 77); Omaha, Nebraska, U.S.
- Occupation: Journalist
- Political party: Democrat
- Spouse: Celia (m. 1869; died 1899)
- Children: 11

Cyrus Dicks Bell (August 1848 - October 21, 1925) was a journalist, civil rights activist, and civic leader in Omaha, Nebraska. He owned and edited the black newspaper Afro-American Sentinel during the 1890s. He was an outspoken political independent and later in his life became a strong supporter of Democrats. He was a founding member of the state Afro-American League and frequently spoke out against lynchings and about other issues of civil rights.

== Life ==
Bell was born into slavery in August 1848 and raised on a cotton farm in Mississippi. In about 1864 he escaped as a "contraband" and moved to St. Louis. He moved to Omaha on March 24, 1868, and believed he was the first African American to vote Democrat in Omaha.

Bell married a woman named Celia on June 3, 1869. She came to Omaha from Leavenworth, Kansas, in 1868 and was born in Beaufort, South Carolina, in about 1853. She died December 18, 1899. Celia and Cyrus had 11 children. Their oldest son, Eugene M. worked for the Omaha World Herald. Another son, Walter, was manager at the newspaper the Afro-American Sentinel which Cyrus owned and edited. A third son was named Ira. Bell's oldest daughter, Ida May, married Silas Johnson on July 18, 1894. Bell's other daughters included, Beulah (married June 28, 1905, to Fred Emory) Gertrude (married Gordon Handy of Chicago), Bessie, and Adiline.

On November 6, 1893, Bell was inducted into the office of U. S. Storekeeper, Bell worked occasionally as a painter, and Bell and his family ran a laundry service. Bell was an officer in the Widow's Son Grand Lodge, Prince Hall. Bell was a very active member of Omaha's St. Philip's Methodist Episcopal Church and involved in the state Methodist Episcopal church as well. In this capacity, he was refused admission to a Methodist Episcopal convention in 1889 because his selection to the convention had not occurred in the presence of the missionary assigned to the black mission. Bell died at the age of 77 on October 21, 1925. His funeral was at St. Philip the Deacon and he was buried at Forest Lawn Cemetery.

== Political independent ==
Cyrus Bell was mentioned as a good candidate for city, county, legislative, or state office by the anti-Republican Omaha Herald in 1878, although this was in part brought up by the paper as an illustration of the Republicans' poor commitment to black rights in Omaha. Bell, himself, made the complaint that "hundreds of colored men are constantly disfranchised from holding office by the Republican party whilst casting a solid vote and giving power to that party.". Bell again expressed his frustration at the Republican Party in Nebraska for failing to promote black candidates for elected and appointed offices in February 1879, writing in opposition to a letter by Benjamin Fulton.

In a March 30, 1879, celebration of the anniversary of the ratification of the 15th amendment at the Masonic Hall, Bell and another prominent Omaha ex-slave, Edwin R. Overall, spoke. Overall emphasized the ascendance of ex-confederates to federal elective office, while Bell focused on the need for blacks to vote independently and that emancipation alone did not bring blacks to full citizenship.

Bell, along with John Jeffcoat and Silas Robbins, led the Afro-American Bimetallic League in Omaha during the pro-growth/pro-inflation Free Silver movement of William Jennings Bryan in the late 1890s, and Bell played a prominent role in the Negro Interstate Free Silver League headed by George Edwin Taylor. Bell considered Bryan a friend, and praised him in his paper, but joined the majority of African Americans in endorsing the McKinley Hobart ticket.

Bell was a delegate to the Douglas County Democratic Convention September 3, 1898.

His Democratic leanings and calls for political independence occasionally put him at odds with other black Omaha leaders, including his friend John Albert Williams and Matthew Ricketts, and he was a supporter of independent black leaders such as William Monroe Trotter and Booker T. Washington.

== Afro-American League ==
In late 1889 and early 1890, Chicago's T. Thomas Fortune called for the organization of local leagues for the purpose of the advancement of blacks which would meet in January 1890 to form the National Afro-American League. On January 9, 1890, a meeting was held in Omaha to this effect. Overall was elected chairman of the meeting. Other leaders at the meeting were J. O. Adams, Price Saunders, E. S. Clemens, Cyrus D. Bell, W. B. Walker, Parker, Alfred S. Barnett, W. G. Woodbey, F. Lewis, Dr. Stephens, Alfonso Wilson, Fed Thomas, Silas Robbins, and Dr. Matthew Ricketts. There was a disagreement over the local league's constitution. While Adams supported Overall, Ricketts, Walker, and Bell loudly opposed Overall's domination of the writing of the constitution. Ricketts initially opposed the idea that whites could be allowed in the league, fearing they could dominate it, but Walker supported that clause convincingly. There was also a debate over dues. Ricketts, Barnett, and Thomas were selected to be the local league's delegates to the national convention of the league and Robbins would attend the national convention as a delegate from the Republican Colored Club. Eventually, Ricketts, A. L. Bennet, S. G. Thomas, Silas Robbins, and Overall attended.

Among the issues discussed at the State Afro-American League meeting in 1890 were segregated restaurants, segregated barbers, and segregated public houses. Southern oppression and northern caste were denounced. An important division at the meeting was the call made by Cyrus Bell and supported by Matthew Ricketts that African Americans no longer give their full support to the Republicans, but, rather vote their conscious. The motion was especially disliked by delegates who did not live in Omaha

== Civil rights ==
Bell frequently took part in local meetings to discuss the condition of African Americans. In January, 1876, Edwin R. Overall, William R. Gamble, and Rev W. H. Wilson organized a State Convention of Colored men. The convention met to discuss lynching and to select delegates for the national convention to be held in Nashville later that year. Overall, Dr. W. H. C. Stephenson, Wilson, and Gamble were selected as delegates, with Curry, John Lewis, Calvin Montgomery, and P. Hampton as alternates. Wilson served as president of the meeting, Curry, Lewis, and J. C. Boone as vice presidents, and Cyrus D. Bell as secretary In September, 1879, Bell organized a meeting with Dr. W. H. C. Stephenson chair and Emanuel S. Clenlans secretary to express the political views of the Omaha black community.

In the early 1890s, local leaders James Alexander, Matthew Rickets, Richard Gamble, and Bell were outspoken in condemnation of the lynching in Omaha of George Smith (aka Joe Coe, a convicted rapist) and threatened lynching of Sam Payne (convicted murderer of Maud Rubel). Later, he criticized the Omaha World-Herald′s coverage of a 1909 lynching in Cairo, Illinois, feeling that the paper condoned the action.

Edwin R. Overall, John Albert Williams, and Cyrus D. Bell worked to bring a convention of the National Colored Personal Liberty League led by Henry Clay Hawkings to Omaha August 17, 1898 during the Trans-Mississippi Exposition. On August 22, the National Colored Press Association met in Omaha as well. Also that month the Western Negro Press Association met; where John Albert Williams was selected first vice president and Bell was selected treasurer

He remained active in politics and civil rights even late in his life. He was an officer of another black political club, the Mutual Interest Club, in 1910.

== Afro-American Sentinel ==
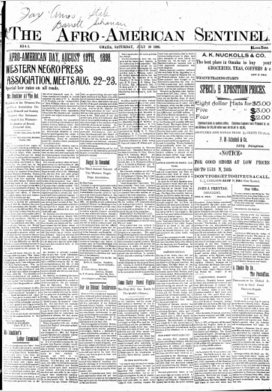
Cover

In 1889, Ferdinand L. Barnett began publishing a black newspaper in Omaha called The Progress. In 1892 or 1893, Bell established the Afro-American Sentinel and in 1893, George F. Franklin began publishing the Enterprise (later owned and edited by John Albert Williams). The Sentinel was noted in its pro-Democrat, pro-Grover Cleveland stance, and the three papers became rivals. In the wake of Booker T. Washington's 1895 Atlanta Compromise Speech, the three papers had different responses. Barnett's Progress opposed any sort of compromise, Franklin's Enterprise supported Washington's leadership in making a compromise, while Bell's Sentinel openly endorsed the position that higher education for blacks should be limited, writing "the race is in too big a hurry," and that there were not yet jobs for blacks who had higher education, and thus the education was disruptive to society.

== See also ==
- History of African Americans in Omaha in the 19th century
