= Harrison J. Pinkett =

American journalist, civil rights activist and lawyer

- Born: 1882; Luray, Virginia, U.S.
- Died: July 19, 1960 (aged 78); Omaha, Nebraska, U.S.
- Education: Howard University; Columbia University
- Occupations: Journalist, Lawyer

Harrison J. Pinkett (1882 – July 19, 1960) was a journalist and civil rights activist in Washington DC and then a lawyer in Omaha, Nebraska. As a journalist, he was the head of the so-called "Press Bureau" and often used the bureau's collective pen name, "P.S. Twister". In 1907, at the recommendation of friends in the NAACP, he moved to Omaha where he frequently worked in civil rights. He served as a first lieutenant in the 92nd Infantry Division in World War I and frequently defended the rights of black soldiers.

== Life ==
Harrison J. Pinkett was born in Luray, Virginia in the Shenandoah Valley in 1882 to Civil War Veteran Charles Pinkett, of Indian and black ancestry, and Columbia Kemper, a white woman. He had fifteen siblings, seven of whom died in early youth. Included among these are two sisters, Daisy and Carrie, and four brothers, Archibald S, Wallace, Martin, and Charles. His father was a wagon maker and wheel wright. Archibald was also a lawyer and served as Secretary of the Washington DC branch of the NAACP.

Along with Archibald, Harrison was a part of the Howard University Law School class of 1906. He also received education at Columbia University. In DC, Pinkett worked as a bricklayer and printer and worked for a time as a printer in Martinsburg, West Virginia and as an apprentice journalist at the Pioneer Press. His first wife was Eva Madah Banks. Eva died January 20, 1948. He later remarried and his second wife was named Venus.

In 1936 he was interviewed by the Federal Writers' Project funded by the Works Progress Administration. In that interview he talks about his life and especially about the lynching of Willy Brown.

== Journalist and Activist ==
Pinkett was active in student affairs while at Howard. He took part in the Blackstone Club and was active at the Bethel Literary and Historical Society (where he was secretary) and the Richards Debating Club. In 1905, Pinkett acted as secretary of the first meeting of the Niagara Society in Washington, DC presided by DC Society Head, Lafayette McKeene Hershaw. Hershaw was then elected secretary with the presidency going to John F. Cook: Pinkett shifted to assistant secretary. Other officers included, Lewis Henry Douglass, Francis James Grimké, William Henry Harrison Hart, William Calvin Chase, William H Richard, John Wesley Cromwell, and William C. Martin.

In January, 1907, Pickett was admitted to the DC bar and became a prolific writer for black papers. He served as manager and attorney of a group called the Press Bureau under the pen name "P.S. Twister". In this capacity, he was deeply critical of other black leaders, including Journalist R. W. Thompson, and of Howard University President, Wilbur P. Thirkield for their support of the election of Booker T. Washington, Jesse E. Moorland, J. H. N. Warring, and John T. Baldwin to the Board of that university because of their connection with capitalists as well as previous Howard University President, John Gordon. Writings under this pen name ceased and he was asked by black leaders to consider practicing law in Omaha, where he moved in 1908 becoming the first University trained lawyer in Nebraska. Pinkett's connection to DC continued, and W. E. B. Du Bois visited Pinket in Omaha in the summer of 1908.

== Omaha Lawyer ==
When he arrived in Omaha, he was listed as one of four black lawyers along with S Robbins, F L Smith, and J W Carr. An early national case Pinkett worked in was in support of black troops stationed in Omaha who were erroneously discharged for involvement in the 1906 Brownsville Affair which falsely accused troops stationed in Brownsville of a disturbance at Brownsville bars resulting in the death of a white bartender and the wounding of a police officer. The affair reached Omaha when an imposter who went by the name G S Ward claiming to represent Senator Joseph B. Foraker and presenting a list to the command at Fort Omaha of individuals who supposedly confessed to involvement. He also spoke out against the mob involved Greek Town riot of 1909.

In 1911, he wrote an affidavit in support of newly elected governor Chester Hardy Aldrich's accusations of fraud (that three times as many votes were cast as the population supported) in the election in Omaha's third ward, a position which put him in opposition to Tom Dennison's supposed machinations and in support of John Lewis and his Anti-Saloon League. In a not dissimilar situation, Pinkett was a part of campaigns in 1916 to make Douglass County a dry county.

Blacks were not united in support of Pinkett, however. He was heavily involved in the prosecution of black businesses in Omaha's Midway, which before World War I was the city's red light district. He spoke against saloons and bootlegging joints and called for greater enforcement of laws against drug sales, noting the availability of morphine, opium, and cocaine. Both before and after the war he worked for the newspaper, The Monitor, which gave his message a voice, and in 1921 he started the short-lived newspaper A New Era.

== World War I ==
Pinkett was a strong patriot and in the days before the United States declared war on the German Empire and joined World War I, he wrote a letter to the Omaha World Herald in support of the action and calling blacks to service. Pinkett enlisted, becoming one of five Omaha officers (Pinkett was a first lieutenant).

Pinkett received his commission at Fort Des Moines on October 15, 1917 after five months training and first reported to Camp Dodge. He served with as battalion adjutant for the first battalion of the 366th Infantry in the 92nd Infantry Division. He landed in France on June 26, 1918 and was stationed for six weeks at Bourbonne for training. He then was sent to the Boche to the Vosges sector. He saw active service for a month on the Vosges sector, he was ten days on the Argonne, and a month on the Metz sector where he was when armistice was signed. He believed his men fought gallantly, noting that of 32 distinguished services medals given to the 92nd division, his organization received 22 of them. Upon the end of World War II, Pinkett remembered the hearing of the November 11, 1918 armistice while under fire in front of Metz, saying, "The colored boys under me laid down their rifles, and the Germans did the same. They rushed across the clearing that separated them and embraced with joy."

Near the end of the war while serving in Mayenne, France Pinkett continued to write editorials to the World Herald, writing in support of a national cemetery in France. Pinkett returned to the US March 1, and was discharged at Camp Upton on March 8 and returned to Omaha shortly after.

== Committee of 5,000 controversy ==
In early 1921, Pinkett became the focus of a controversy in Omaha. In part, the controversy arose when he sued pastor W C Williams of St. John AME Church (where Pinkett had been a member) over financial irregularities when the church built a factory for the employment of the women in the church. At nearly the same time, Pinkett hired George Wells Parker to be editor of the newspaper "The New Era", a paper Pinkett paid to produce. When the pair disagreed over the contents of the paper, Parker created a new paper, "The Omaha Whip" which managed two editions before closing. Parker accused Pinket and two other men, Ole Jackson and Johnny Moore, of promising to give the black vote to police superintendent Dean Ringer. The accusations included that the police look the other way while Moore, who had recently been released from prison, and Jackson sold "anything they want to sell". Further, Parker accused Pinkett of association with the supporters of the Ku-Klux-Klan and called on Omahan's to stand by the campaigns of Mayor James C. Dahlman and his party. Williams preached in support of Parker and against what he believed was police protection of these joints and called black candidate for police commissioner John T. McDonald, Sr to state his position. Williams also associated his opponents with a group called the "committee of 5,000" which he claimed consisted of the ministers and members of white Protestant churches in Omaha who campaigned against Jews, Catholics, and blacks in the city and supposedly had KKK ties

== Law and civil rights work ==
The Omaha NAACP was founded in 1918 after Mary White Ovington spoke in Omaha and after the end of World War I was led by Pinkett and Father John Albert Williams. W. E. B. Du Bois came and spoke to the group in May 1919 and Mayor Edward P. Smith was in attendance. An important cause of the violence throughout 1919 were cases of police or media sensationalize of crimes perpetrated by blacks and the resulting anger and violence of whites. When the paper, the Omaha Bee, ran such a story, the Omaha NAACP organized a rally in protest of over 600 people. Another report in the Bee of a rape allegation against Willy Brown in September 1919 is often considered the instigation of violence by a mob of whites culmination in the lynching of Willy Brown and followed by more rioting and violence. Among others, Williams and Pinkett worked to bring peace in the city. Pinkett would later blame the riots on the Dennison machine as an action in support of Dahlman and against Smith for Mayor.

In a similar indecent seven years later, Pinkett played another important role. Blacks living in North Platte faced mob violence and fled the city after a police officer was killed on July 15, 1929. Pinkett, John Andrew Singleton, and E W Killingsworth petitioned the governor to step in and worked closely with the governor in reducing tension and allowing the people to return to their homes.

In the case of street violence, Pinkett supported increased policing both of blacks and whites. Pinkett also protested what he felt was inequal enforcement and police harassment of blacks and black owned businesses. In 1922, he served as the attorney for Robert H. Johnson, who he felt was a victim of a different kind of police abuse. Johnson was a political agitator who supported M. L. Endes for police commissioner and who was arrested and held in jail the week of the election. Pinkett claimed in court that Johnson's right of habeas corpus was illegally taken and the acts of the police were in retaliation for Johnson's politics.

Pinkett also continued a somewhat antagonistic involvement in Howard University affairs, working to remove John Stanley from president of the institution. Indeed, the vehemence of his positions was not without cost. On October 26, 1927, Picket was attacked by a man brandishing a pistol in response to his work with Reverend John Grant of St. John's AME against gambling.

In 1928, the NAACP retained Pinkett to aid in the defense of serial killer Jake "the Chopper" Bird - defense was led by Edwin D Mitchell.

== Omaha civic leader ==
In conjunction with other black leaders, including Father John Albert Williams, John Andrew Singleton, and Thomas P. Mahammitt, Pinkett was instrumental in the creation of Omaha's Colored Commercial Club to support black business in Omaha and while generally a Republican, supported the Negro Democratic Club. He was also an integral part of the Omaha Branch of the NAACP and, along with John Williams and W. W. Peebles, and strongly spoke out against the World Herald's publishing remarks of KKK imperial wizard, Hiram Wesley Evans. He continued to work with veterans and was an officer Roosevelt Post No. 30, American Legion.

Later in his career he frequently lectured on African American history and continued involvement with civic organizations. In 1933, Pinkett ran for the post of city commissioner where he lost in the primary. In 1936, ran and lost again. He continued to write letters to the editor in support of civil rights as well as work as a defense attorney and as council for the NAACP in Omaha until his death in 1960.

== Writings ==
- H.J. Pinkett, An Historical Sketch of the Omaha Negro (1937). - parts of this text are available appended to WPA interview by Fred Dixon of Arthur Goodlett https://www.loc.gov/resource/wpalh1.16041210/
