= Frederick S. Stott =

American architect

- Born: December 27, 1889; Saint Paul, Minnesota, U.S.
- Died: September 14, 1968 (aged 78); Los Angeles, California, U.S.
- Resting place: Mountain View Cemetery, Los Angeles
- Occupation: Architect

Frederick Simon Stott (December 27, 1889 – September 14, 1968) was an American architect. Active in Nebraska and California, he was a member of the American Institute of Architects.

== Life and career ==
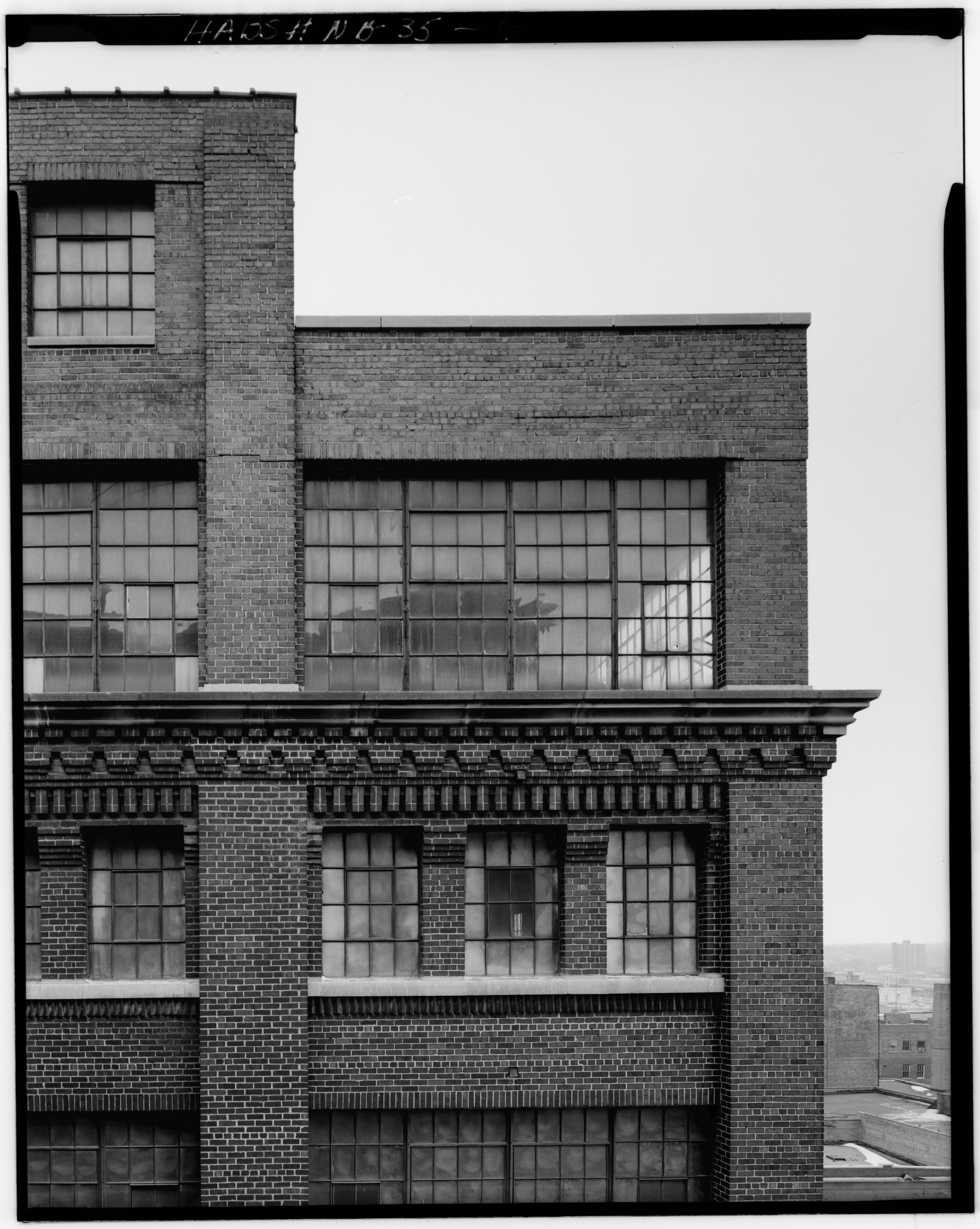
The M.E. Smith Building, designed by Stott, built in 1920 and formerly located at 201 South 10th Street in Omaha. It was demolished in 1989.

Stott was born on December 27, 1889, in Saint Paul, Minnesota.

He married Agnes Cornelia Russell (1891–1982), with whom he had at least one child: son, Russell Frederick Stott (1922–2005). He was a Harvard University graduate, and was in the Construction Division of the United States Army during World War I.

In 1919, Stott opened an office at 216 Kennedy Building in Omaha, Nebraska. He was formerly with John McDonald. He lived with his wife at 411 N. 40th Street.

The St. John African Methodist Episcopal Church in Omaha, completed in 1921, is "widely regarded as a quality example of the Prairie style of design". It is now listed on the National Register of Historic Places.

Stott was elected to the American Institute of Architects by 1925.

The following year, Stott designed the M. E. Smith Building in the Jobbers Canyon Historic District in Omaha. All but one of the 24 buildings in the district were demolished in 1989, the largest National Register historic district loss to date.

=== Death ===
Stott died in Los Angeles on September 14, 1968, aged 78. He is interred in the city's Mountain View Cemetery.
