= Emanuel S. Clenlans =

Civil rights activist

- Born: c. 1841; Washington, D.C., U. S.
- Occupation: Postal Clerk
- Political party: Republican
- Spouse: Ophelia Clenlans

Emmanuel S. Clenlans (born c. 1841) was an American civil rights activist and postal worker in Omaha, Nebraska. Clenlans was born about 1841 in Washington, DC. He married a woman named Ophelia and they had a daughter named Laura (married name of Craig). In 1876, Clenlans was a part of the Nebraska Convention of Colored Americans, where he was on the committee on resolutions, and in 1879, Clenlans was a part of a meeting organized by Cyrus D. Bell with Dr. W. H. C. Stephenson, chair and Clenlans, secretary to express the political views of the Omaha black community. H. W. Coesley, Bell, and Gabriel Young played prominent committee roles in the meeting. The meeting passed resolutions against the unilateral support of blacks to the Republican party. In spite of this, he was a delegate to the state Republican convention in 1888. In 1890, he was a part of the forming of the Nebraska branch of the National Afro-American League, and was part of the committee that wrote the constitution of the state branch.

Professionally, he was a clerk in the post office from the 1870s until at least 1910. Along with his postal service work, he owned a business with J. C. Parker, the Coal and Feed store, at 1016 N 24th St.
