= Ophelia Clenlans =

American activist and journalist

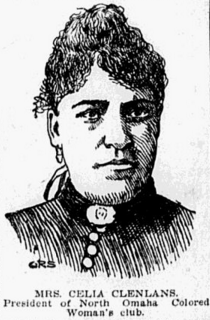
- Ophelia Clenlans in 1901
- Born: c. 1841; Platte County, Missouri, U. S.
- Died: February 12, 1907 (aged 65–66); Omaha, Nebraska, United States
- Occupation: Journalist
- Spouse: Emanuel S. Clenlans

Ophelia Clenlans (c. 1841 – February 12, 1907) was a civil rights activist and journalist from Omaha, Nebraska.

== Biography ==
Clenlans was born a slave in about 1841 in Platte County, Missouri, and came to Omaha. Clenlans married Emanuel S. Clenlans and they had one daughter, Laura (married name of Craig).

Clenlans was appointed a member of the executive board of the National Federation of Afro-American Women in 1896. She was also a prominent member of the Omaha Colored Women's Club led by Ella Mahammitt. She was a prime mover or the organization of the North and South Omaha Colored Woman's club. She was treasurer of the Nebraska chapter of the Ruth Corps, an Omaha religious group, and an officer of the Prince Hall Order of the Eastern Star.

She was an outspoken activist for racial equality. In 1901, she wrote in the Omaha World-Herald about a debate over whether black women should be allowed to join white Women's Clubs throughout the country: "I belong to the old slavery days. I know what it is to suffer, and I know what it is to feel grateful. I am grateful to my white sisters for their assistance in many ways, and I want them to understand that we only desire to learn of them that we may be better enabled to help ourselves and our families.[...]" "Who is responsible for the white blood in black veins, but the whites themselves, and who can say but what black blood flows in the veins of many a woman whose skin would cause the rose to blush? Did the blacks do it? Were they the ones that caused the color of the negro to change? Shame on such hypocrisy. Shame on a woman who is afraid to take another woman by the hand and say, 'God bless you in your noble work.'".

She also wrote in the World-Herald about interracial marriage: "As to love between the two colors, that is a matter open to discussion, yet to my mind, love is a God-given instinct, over which no man or woman has control.[...] Intermarriage with the whites is last in their thoughts, but intellectual equality they have a right to expect, and who has a right to deny them this boon?"

Clenlans died on February 12, 1907, of cancer and pneumonia. Her funeral was at the St. John's AME Church and she was buried at Forest Lawn Cemetery.
