= Quinn Chapel African Methodist Episcopal Church and Parsonage =

- U.S. National Register of Historic Places
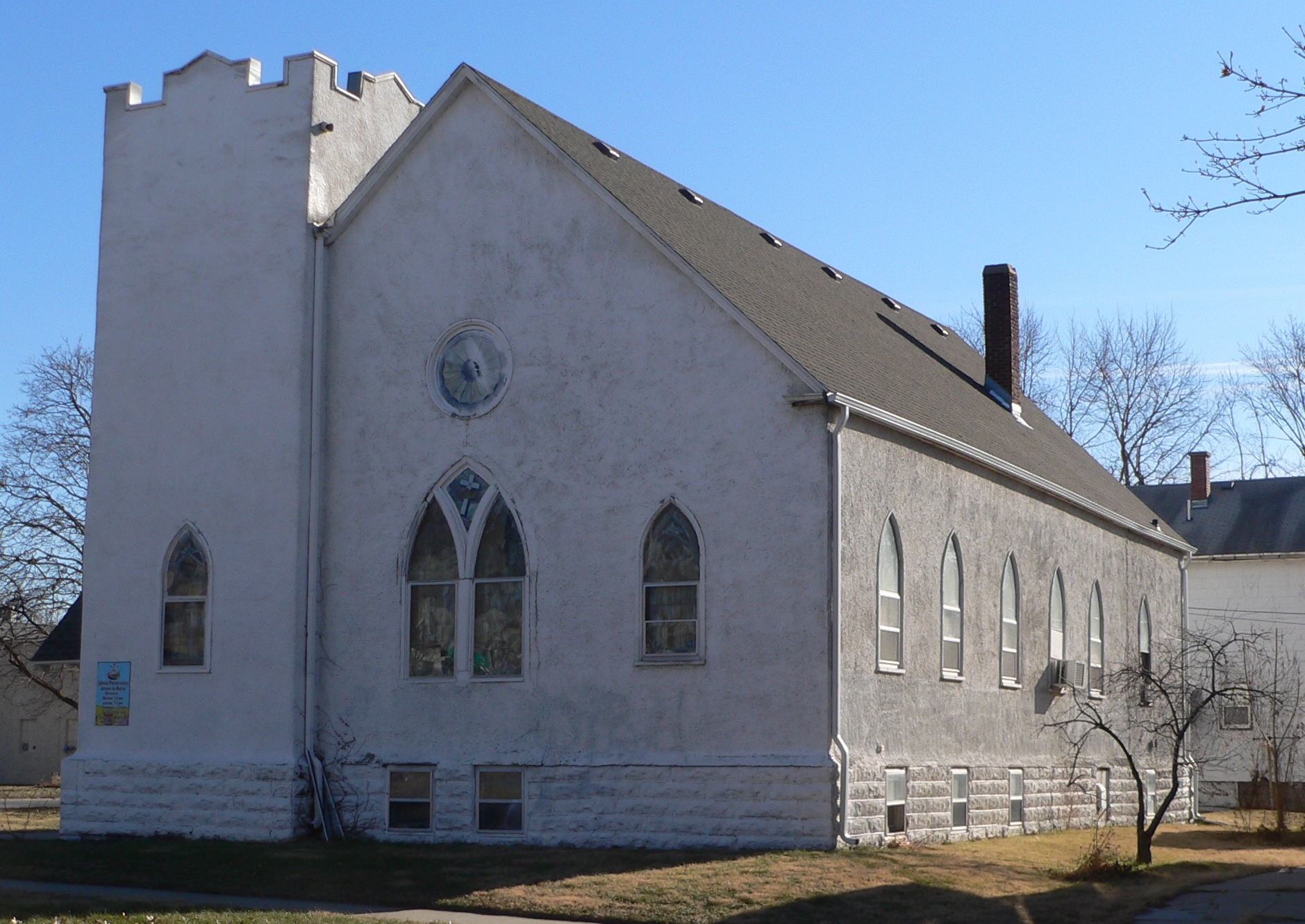
- The chapel in 2012

- Location within Nebraska Location within the United States
- Location: 1225 South 9th Street, Lincoln, Nebraska
- Coordinates: 40°48′01″N 96°42′26″W
- Area: less than one acre
- Built: 1905
- Built by: A.L. Hansen
- Architect: A.W. Woods
- Architectural style: Late Gothic Revival, American foursquare
- MPS: African American Historic and Architectural Resources in Lincoln, Nebraska MPS
- NRHP reference No.: 99000749
- Added to NRHP: June 25, 1999

Quinn Chapel African Methodist Episcopal (AME) Church was the first Black church to be founded in Lincoln, Nebraska.

Founding members of Quinn Chapel started meeting in their homes in 1870 with an itinerant minister. In 1871, Rev. G. W. Gaines officially organized the church. The first church of the congregation was built in 1889 between 10th and 11th on E Street. It was 2.5 stories tall with a 60 foot tall spire. In 1899, the congregation lost that building and moved into a renovated two-story apartment building at 1026 F Street. In 1905, the congregation constructed a new building on F Street. The building was moved to 925 C Street in 1915.

The Quinn Chapel African Methodist Episcopal Church and Parsonage is a historic structure that was listed on the National Register of Historic Places since June 25, 1999. The chapel was built by A. L. Hansen in 1905, and designed in the Gothic Revival style. The parsonage, designed in the American Foursquare style, was built in 1923. The chapel was redesigned by architect A. W. Woods in 1926. Both structures are affiliated with the African Methodist Episcopal Church. The property has been
