= William Gamble (cricketer) =

English cricketer

William Gamble (5 November 1798 in Leicester – 10 August 1855 in Leicester) was an English cricketer who was associated with Leicester Cricket Club from 1821 to 1829 and made his debut in 1828.

== Bibliography ==
- Haygarth, Arthur (1862). Scores & Biographies, Volume 2 (1827–1840). Lillywhite.
