= John Lewis (Nebraska activist) =

- Born: c. 1841; Virginia, U.S.
- Occupations: Hotel keeper, musician
- Political party: Republican
- Spouse: Charity

John Lewis (c. 1841 – ?) was a hotel keeper, musician, and civil rights activist in Omaha, Nebraska. He was proprietor of the Lewis House in the early days of Omaha. In 1879, he organized a brass band which was a fixture in African-American events in Omaha in the 1880s. He was active in the Nebraska State Convention of Colored Americans, a part of the Colored Conventions Movement and involved in Republican politics in Omaha.

== Career ==
By 1876, John Lewis was proprietor of the Lewis House hotel. In 1879, Lewis organized a brass band initially consisting of eleven members and instructed by professor Toozer. The band adopted the name "Lewis' Excelsior Brass Band" and had Lewis as president, Cyrus D. Bell as secretary, Frank Bellmay as assistant secretary and D. H. Johnson as treasurer. Toozer was a drummer in the British Army Band in the Crimean War and was the leader of the Union Pacific Band, where he was an employee from 1867 to 1905. Lewis's brass band played at numerous celebrations, including the 1880 15th Amendment anniversary celebration and the August 4, 1887, anniversary of emancipation.

== Political life ==
In June 1870, R. D. Curry was voted in Omaha's Third Ward as Republican candidate for Trustee, but white Omaha Republicans opposed Curry's selection and nominated someone else. This created a good deal of distrust of Republicans in Omaha by blacks. In response, a committee of black citizens in Omaha chaired by John Lewis and with G. G. Iredell as secretary was formed to encourage blacks to distance themselves from party politics and to vote more independently. On January 18, 1876, Lewis was a delegate to the Nebraska State Convention of Colored Men, led by E. R. Overall, Rev W. H. Wilson, and C. D. Bell.

Black Republicans met August 18, 1880, to send delegates to the state convention from each of Omaha's six wards as well as the Saratoga precinct. The delegates were: first ward – Peter Williams, W. W. Porter, W. H. C. Stephenson; second ward - George Bolden, Edwin R. Overall, and R. W. Bell; third ward - James O. Adams, John Lewis, B. Sanders; fourth ward - Albert Kercheval, Frank Bellamy, T. Hargreaves; sixth ward - Emanuel S. Clenlans, W. H. Butler, John R. Simpson; Saratoga precinct - Smith Coffee. A similar group met on August 30 at the call of W. H. C. Stephenson, James O. Adams, E. R. Overall, John R. Simpson, and Peter Williams. E. R. Overall was at that time chairman of the Campaign Club and Rev. E. H. Brown of Lincoln was chosen as chairman of the "State Convention of Colored Americans". The convention named Rev. C. M. Brown (Lancaster County) president; J. Gordon (Otoe County), J. Smith (Washington County), John Lewis (Douglas County), and L. W. Washington (Merrick County) as vice presidents; Frank Bellamy (Douglas County), and Benjamin Fulton (Douglas County) as Secretaries.

== See also ==
- African Americans in Omaha, Nebraska
