= North Platte black exodus =

Expulsion of black residents in North Platte

On July 13, 1929, the town of North Platte, Nebraska, experienced a racial exodus (or race riot), when all black residents—somewhere between a few dozen and 200 in number—were ordered to leave by the town's white residents, following the killing of a policeman by a black man. Louis Seeman shot and killed Ed Green after he had been asked to leave the town, and crowds quickly formed, demanding that all black residents vacate. Seeman died in his hiding spot (a chicken coop), either due to suicide or a lynching, and members of the mob were acquitted of any wrongdoing.

== Background ==
After being told he was a public nuisance and ordered to leave the town by white police officer Ed Green, Louis Seeman, a black resident of North Platte either 30 or 35 years old, drew his pistol, shot it at Green, and killed him.

Crowds quickly formed and they demanded that by 3 o'clock, all black residents leave the town. After the formation of these crowds, they became mobs of some 500 people, and they (alongside police) attempted to have Seeman removed from his place of hiding, a chicken coop the mob poured gasoline on and set on fire. During this encounter, Seeman was killed by gunshot, reported as suicide. According to Jim Griffin of the Lincoln County Historical Museum, he was lynched.

The mob, soon armed, shouted "lynch them all" and "run them out of town" as they reportedly began to manhandle many of the black residents in the town.

== Exodus ==
Immediately, the population of black residents left the town, with some leaving on foot and unable to retrieve their belongings. Sources at the time reported, and historian David G. Dales later corroborated, that they faced death threats were they to stay, but a later state investigation was not able to substantiate any report of physical violence. While the chief of police, James Dorran, promised to protect the black residents who were to return, he and state sheriff William Condit were noncommittal: Dorran indicated it "may not be possible" to protect those who returned, and Condit said he would not intervene unless asked to do so, adding that the black residents "are better off in leaving for the time being."

By July 15, governor Arthur Weaver had demanded that the black residents of North Platte be able to safely return to the town, and the attorney general, Christian A. Sorensen, launched an investigatory probe into the racial unrest, warning that he would "prosecute the case to the limit". Both indicated they would prosecute any members of the mob that drove out the town's black residents.

Sources disagree on the number of black residents who lived in North Platte prior to their expulsion. A contemporaneous news source says there were some 200 black residents of the town, while Dales said that the number was on the order of a few dozen.

== Aftermath ==
At least four residents of North Platte faced trial for "unlawful assembly" by August, though three had been acquitted after their jury deliberated for ten minutes. The state made no attempts to further prosecute those involved in the exodus.

It was described by black community leaders in Omaha as among the most serious attacks on black people in the northern United States. Dales said that although the deaths of Green and Seeman were brutal, and although the expulsion of the black population was "an act of force", their exodus was not a race riot.
