= History of slavery in Nebraska =

The history of slavery in Nebraska is generally seen as short and limited. The issue was contentious for the legislature between the creation of the Nebraska Territory in 1854 and the outbreak of the American Civil War in 1861.

There was a particular acceptance of African Americans in the Nebraska Territory when they first arrived en masse. According to a publication by the Federal Writers' Project,

In the Territory of Nebraska the fight to exclude slavery from within the territorial boundaries spread from the Senate to the press and to the pulpit. Even among the slaves in the South the word spread that here was a place where the attitude toward Negroes was tempered with tolerance.

== Early history ==
York, an enslaved African American held by William Clark, traveled and worked with him from 1804 to 1806 as part of the famous Lewis and Clark Expedition's exploration of the Missouri River lands. He was the first black person recorded in what would become Nebraska.

In 1820, the United States Congress passed the Missouri Compromise. It prohibited slavery in the unorganized lands that would become the Nebraska Territory. The topic of slavery in Nebraska would not be revisited by Congress until 1854.

== Kansas–Nebraska Act ==
In 1854 the Kansas–Nebraska Act created the Nebraska Territory. The act overturned the Missouri Compromise by allowing legislatures of the Nebraska and Kansas territories to determine whether to permit or abolish slavery. From 1855 on, what to do about slavery was a recurring topic of debate in the Territorial Legislature.

== Incidents ==
Meanwhile, some immigrant farmers from Southern states brought a small number of slaves with them into the territory. "In Nebraska the people never voted for slavery, but people coming here from the South brought slaves with them. In 1855 there were thirteen slaves in Nebraska and in 1860 there were ten. Most of these were held at Nebraska City."

It is not generally known, but it is a fact, that there were from 1856 to 1858 more slaves in Nebraska than in Kansas. Most of the Kansas slaves were conveyed to the North Star section [the Underground Railroad] soon after. The first attempt to cross the Missouri River by the new route was made by the Massachusetts party, under the charge of Martyn Stowell, of which I was a member. We were the advance guard in July, 1856, of Jim Lane's hastily gathered command. The Nebraska City ferry was a flat boat worked by a Southern settler named Nuckolls, who had brought slaves there and who declared we should not cross. Three of us, who were mounted, rode down, called, and got the ferry over on the Iowa or eastern side of the river with Nuckolls himself in charge, and we held him there until our little company of sixty-five young men, with three wagons, wene ferried over. These incidents are only mentioned to show the nature of the obstacles. Mr. Nuckolls yielded to our persuasive force, aided by that of his neighbors, many of whom were free state in sympathy, and perhaps even more by the profit he found by the large ferriage tolls we promptly paid.

On November 25, 1858, two slaves owned by the above Mr. Nuckolls escaped, and on June 30, 1860, six slaves owned by Alexander Majors also of Nebraska City did the same thing. Two slaves were sold at public auction in Nebraska City on December 5, 1860.

In 1859, the Daily Nebraskian newspaper reported that it favored slavery:

The bill introduced in [Omaha City] Council, for the abolition of slavery in this Territory, was called up yesterday, and its further consideration postponed for two weeks. A strong effort will be made among the Republicans to secure its passage; we think, however, it will fail. The farce certainly cannot be enacted if the Democrats do their duty.

During that period, several local newspapers openly editorialized against the presence of blacks in Omaha, for the Confederacy and against the election and re-election of Abraham Lincoln. Nebraska Territory Governor Samuel W. Black vetoed two antislavery bills during these years, arguing that popular sovereignty, as defined by the Kansas-Nebraska Act, made it the responsibility of the drafters of the state constitution to outlaw slavery, as opposed to the Territorial Legislature. There were many legislators who argued that Nebraska simply did not need a law because slavery did not exist "in any practical form" in the state.

The 1860 census showed that of the 82 blacks in Nebraska, 67 were free and 15 were enslaved, including 5 in Kearney County and 10 in Otoe County.

Answering the criticism of legislators who opposed an anti-slavery law, Mr. Little, a legislator, remarked in session that:

The opponents of this measure have not a single reason to advance why this bill should not pass. They put forth, however, some excuses for opposing it. They come forth with the miserable plea that they are opposed to blotting our statute books with useless legislation. Sir, this is not so much a plea against this law as it is in favor of blotting our territory with slavery. They say that slavery does not exist here, and that this measure is useless. This excuse will not now hold good, for a president's message has just reached us, in which it is declared, and in this opinion he is backed by a powerful party, that men have the right to bring slaves here, and to hold them as such, and that this is slave territory ... If the friends of slavery insist that they have the right to hold slaves here, shall we tamely submit to it? If they insist on making this a slave territory, which they do, shall we not insist that it shall be forever free?

In 1861 the territorial legislature passed a bill prohibiting slavery in Nebraska, but the governor vetoed it. He claimed that since there were few slaves in the territory, passing a slavery ban was an unworthy use of time, and that the issue should instead be raised if Nebraska earned statehood. The veto message was called "the weakest paper we have ever known to come from a man of the Governor's pretentions and acknowledged ability" by the Nebraska Advertiser in 1861. A vote of ten to three in the Territory Council, and thirty-three to three in the Territorial House overrode his veto, and slavery was forbidden in Nebraska.

Although the Territory prohibited slavery, at first the legislators limited suffrage to "free white males", as was typical of many states. Following the Civil War, having this clause in the proposed 1866 Nebraska State Constitution delayed Nebraska's entrance to the Union for nearly a year, until the legislature changed it.

== Mayhew Cabin ==
Located just outside Nebraska City, Nebraska, is the Mayhew Cabin. Built in 1855, it was owned by Allen and Barbara (Kagi) Mayhew. John Henri Kagi, Barbara's brother, met and was deeply influenced by abolitionist John Brown in 1856. Kagi became the secretary of war in Brown's army. Kagi made his sister's farm a stop on the Underground Railroad to house slaves escaping from the South. In 2005, the Mayhew's cabin was rehabilitated. Today, the museum site also houses the Mt. Zion African Methodist Episcopal Church, one of the first black churches established west of the Missouri River.

== See also ==
- African Americans History of Nebraska
- African Americans in Omaha, Nebraska
- History of slavery in Kansas
