= P. G. Lowery =

American conductor, cornetist, and composer (1869–1942)

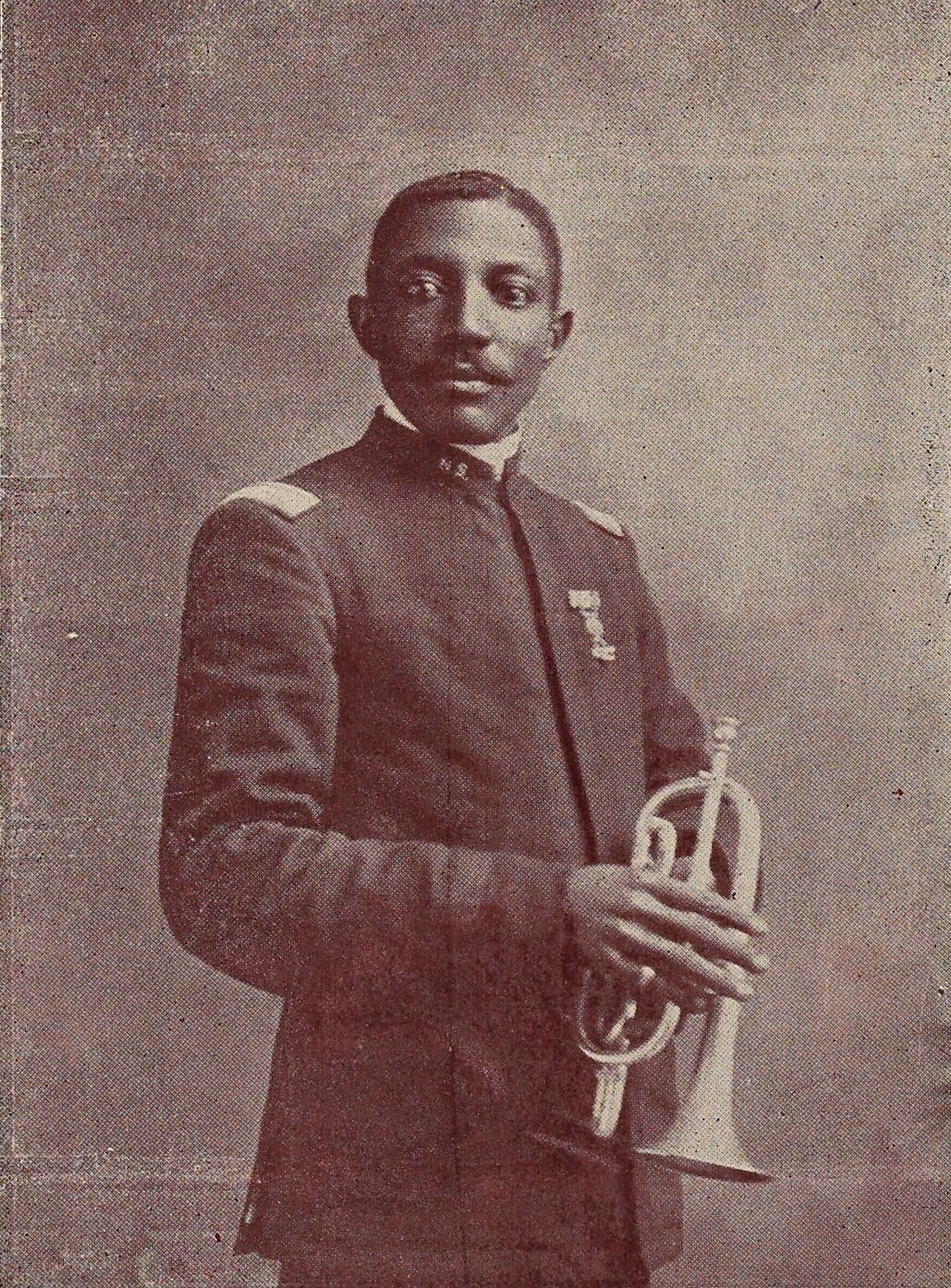
- P. G. Lowery holding a cornet

Background information
- Born: Perry George Lowery; October 11, 1869; Topeka, Kansas
- Origin: Reece, Kansas U.S.
- Died: December 15, 1942 (aged 73) Cleveland, Ohio
- Genres: Jazz; Ragtime

Perry George Lowery (Topeka, October 11, 1869 – Cleveland, December 15, 1942) was an American composer, conductor, cornet player, and a circus sideshow manager of African American entertainment and musical ensembles.

== Early life ==
Born October 11, 1870, P. G. Lowery came from a musical family. He played the drums in a family band, but later transitioned to cornet.

== Musical career ==
P.G. Lowery spent most of his musical career as a performer, manager, and band leader with different traveling circuses. At the turn of the century the U.S. was a deeply segregated country and economic opportunities were limited. Most African Americans worked in agriculture, domestic work, or unskilled labor. P.G. Lowery and many other Black musicians found opportunities in the circus. The traveling circus was a popular form of entertainment before movies. In the early 1900s every circus had an African-American sideshow band and/or minstrel show.

=== Early career ===
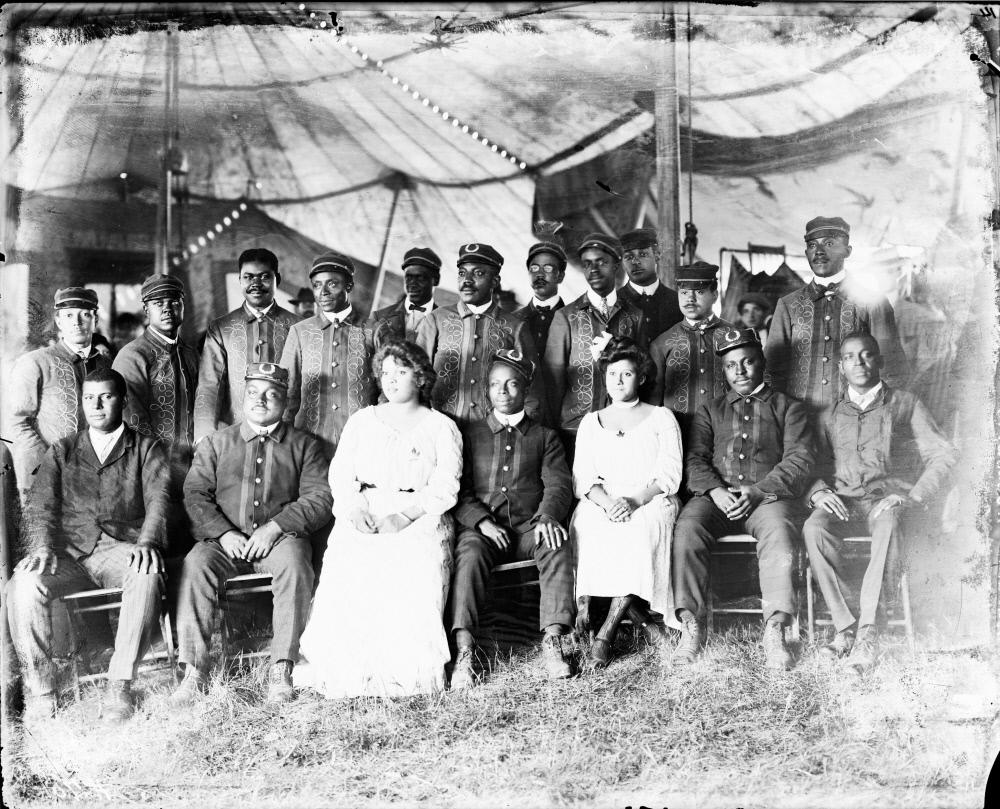
P.G. Lowery Sideshow Band (date unknown).

In 1895 Lowery performed the cornet in a band for the show Darkest America, with the Mallary Brothers Minstrels. The following year he played with the Wallace Circus. Next Lowery became a cornetist with the Original Nashville Students and P. T. Wright's Colored Comedy Company. In 1897 or 1899 he studied at the Boston Conservatory under the direction of Henry C. Brown. In the summer of 1898 he played solo cornet at the Trans-Mississippi Exposition in Omaha, Nebraska with the Original Nashville Students. And in 1899 he started the P.G. Lowery's Famous Concert Band and P.G. Lowery's Vaudeville Company, an important accomplishment because he was the first African American to bring his own vaudeville troupe to the circus.

During the early 1900s he published a newspaper column, "The Cornet and Cornetists of Today" in The Freeman.

=== Late career ===
P.G. Lowery led and managed bands in circus sideshow tents for the remainder of his career. Black band leaders, like P.G. Lowery, "strove toward social and economic equality through hard work and artistic and musical achievement." Lowery worked with the following circuses: Sells Brothers and Forepaugh's Circus, Wallace and Hagenbeck, Ringling Brothers, Cole Brothers, and Barnum and Bailey. His longest stint with a circus was from 1919–1931 with the Ringling Brothers & Barnum and Bailey Circus where he managed his own band.
