= St. John African Methodist Episcopal Church (Omaha, Nebraska) =

Historic church in Nebraska, United States

- St. John A.M.E. Church
- U.S. National Register of Historic Places
- Omaha Landmark
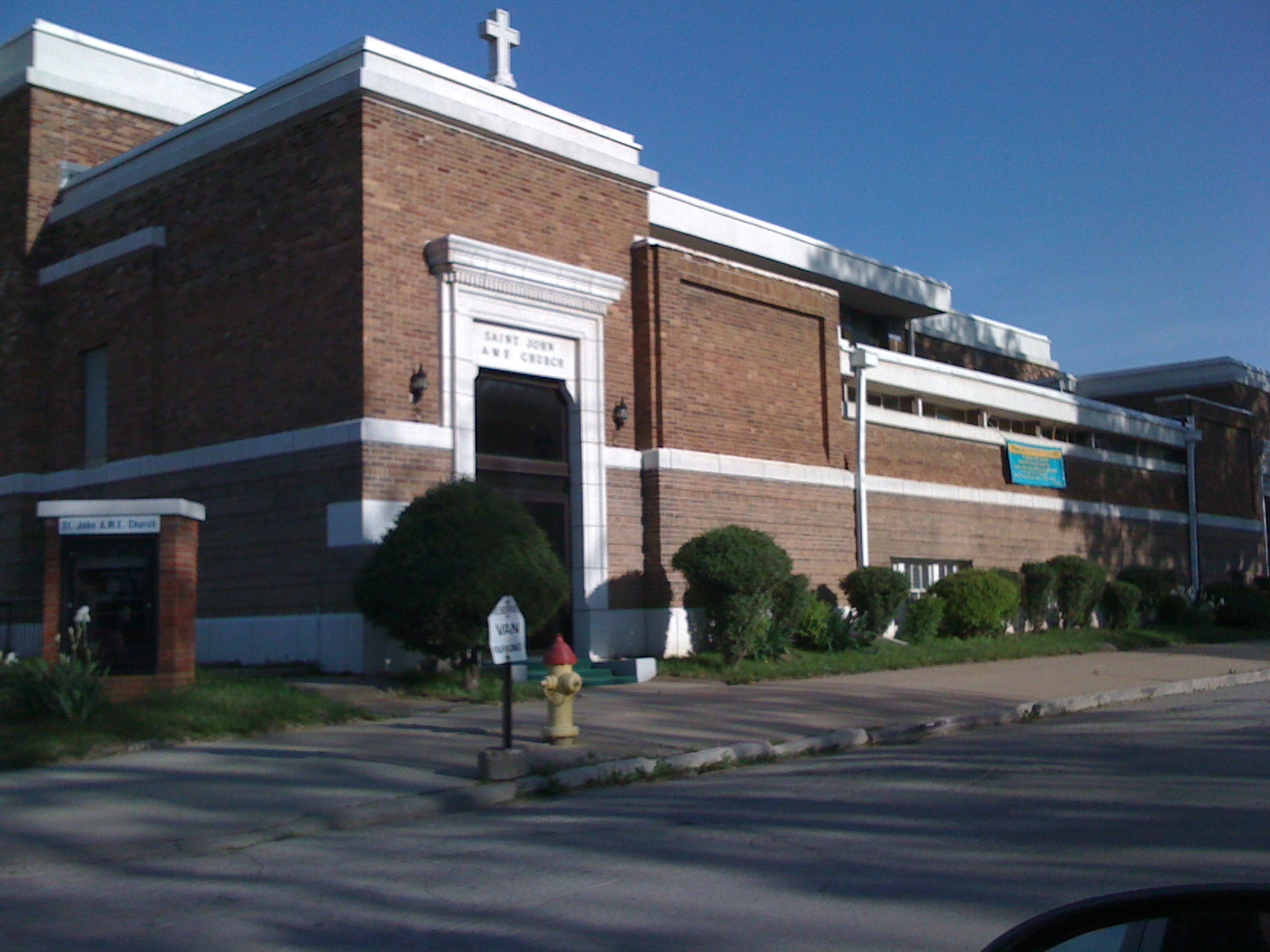
- The east entrance to St. John A.M.E. Church.

- Location within Nebraska Location within the United States
- Location: Omaha, Nebraska
- Coordinates: 41°16′50.6″N 95°56′42.18″W
- Built: 1921
- Architect: Frederick S. Stott
- Architectural style: Prairie School
- NRHP reference No.: 80002449

Significant dates
- Added to NRHP: May 29, 1980
- Designated OMAL: December 19, 1978

St. John African Methodist Episcopal Church was the first church for African Americans in Nebraska, organized in North Omaha in 1867. It is located at 2402 North 22nd Street in the Near North Side neighborhood. The building is listed on the National Register of Historic Places. The building was constructed in the center of Omaha's North Side in the Prairie School architecture style. Prairie School architecture is rare, and this architectural gem in urban Nebraska is particularly unusual for being designed and built in the 1920s, after the Prairie Style's rapid loss of popularity beginning after 1914.

== About ==
Organized in the fall of 1865, the first minister of St. John was Rev. W. T. Osborne, who was also the first African American minister in Nebraska. The first meetings being held at a private residence on Capitol Avenue and Ninth Street in present-day downtown Omaha. After worshiping for a short time on Harney Street, the church moved to Douglas and Fifteenth Streets until the summer of 1865. That year a lot was purchased on the corner of Eighteenth and Webster Streets in Near North Omaha. The original church was built for $1,000.

The longest standing member of the church was Mrs. Eliza Turner, who until her death in 1938 regularly attended St. John's for seventy years. Today St. John hosts a thriving congregation, and the church serves in a variety of capacities to the surrounding community.

=== Pastors ===
- Rev. J. H. Hubbard, 1866 to 1868
- Rev. W. B. Ousley, 1868 to 1869
- W. L. Harrod, 1869 to 1870
- William Sexton, 1870 to 1871
- G. W. Gaines, 1871 to 1873
- J. W. Braxton, 1873 to 1875
- B. F. Watson, 1875 to 1876
- J. A. Fouche, 1876 to 1878

== Architecture ==
St. John's has been housed in three different churches. The second church was located at North 25th and Grant Streets, and was notably designed by Omaha's first African American architect, Clarence W. Wigington, which was built around the turn of the century.

When the congregation outgrew that building, they located a new place to build at 2402 North 22nd Street, St. John A.M.E. Church building was designed by local architect Frederick S. Stott in 1921 in the Prairie School style. In 1947 an auditorium was added, and additional rooms were finished in 1956. The building is remarkable for its reflection of the progressive attitude of its congregation at a time when traditional values in religious architecture were prevalent. The building is recognized as an important contribution to the Prairie School style, and was added to the National Register of Historic Places in May 1980.

== Notable members ==
St. John's has been host to several members who are notable in local and national history. They include:

- Ophelia Clenlans, civil rights leader in Omaha
- Harrison J. Pinkett, the first University trained lawyer in Nebraska and a civil rights leader in Omaha
- W. H. C. Stephenson, a doctor and civil rights leader in Omaha

== See also ==
- History of North Omaha, Nebraska
- Architecture of North Omaha, Nebraska
- Black church
- List of churches in Omaha, Nebraska
