= W. H. C. Stephenson =

American doctor, preacher, and civil rights activist (1825–1899)

- Born: c1825 Washington, D. C., U.S.
- Died: April 6, 1899; Omaha, Nebraska, U.S.
- Occupations: Physician, preacher
- Political party: Republican
- Spouse(s): Jane, Mary

W. H. C. Stephenson (c.1825 – April 6, 1899) was a doctor, preacher, and civil rights activist in Virginia City, Nevada, and Omaha, Nebraska. He was probably the first black doctor in Nevada and worked for the rights of blacks in that city. He was noted for his efforts in support of black suffrage in Nevada at the passing of the Fifteenth Amendment in 1870. He helped found the first Baptist church in Virginia City. He moved to Omaha in the late 1870s and continued his medical, religious, and civil rights work. He founded another Baptist church in Omaha, and was a prominent Republican and activist in the city.

== Life ==
Stephenson was born a slave in Washington, D.C. in about 1825. and trained at one of the Eclectic Medical Institutes in Philadelphia. His medical career was very successful, and his writing frequently appeared in medical journals endorsing botanical remedies such as Sanmetto and Ponca Compound

In 1861 and 1862 he lived in Sacramento and in 1863 he lived in Marysville, California, before moving to the Comstock Lode area. In Virginia City he was married to a woman named Jane and had a daughter, Carrie. He moved to Omaha in the late 1870s and there was married to a woman named Mary. He may have also spent some time in Rhode Island before moving west.

== Nevada ==
In 1865, he helped to organize and was elected chairman of the Nevada Executive Committee to press for legal equality, uniting blacks in Virginia City, Silver City, and Gold Hill. One goal of this group was black inclusion in civic affairs, involving everything from parades to juries. He pushed for the application of the 1866 Civil Rights Act to Nevada, for access to public schools (which were not integrated in Virginia City until after 1872). He also helped to establish the Lincoln Union Club to unify political activity in the state. April 26, 1863, he organized the first Baptist church on the Comstock, "First Baptist (Colored) Church".

At the January 1, 1866, celebration of the anniversary of the Emancipation Proclamation, he said, "It is for colored men to ... Fearlessly meet the opponents of justice... Let colored men contend for 'Equality before the Law.' Nothing short of civil and political rights". He was elected president of the Convention of Colored Citizens of the State of Nevada with treasurer Moses Elliot and Secretary Joseph Price. He was an agent for the Western black paper, the Elevator, published by Philip Alexander Bell

He registered to vote in Nevada as soon as the Fifteenth Amendment passed in 1870, and urged blacks in his community to do the same. That year, the Territorial Enterprise reported that "a person of lighter skin but darker heart refused to register because he would not place his name under the Doctor's." The newspaper offered the opinion that Stephenson would not have objected to placing his name after that of this man because "Dr. Stephenson has intelligence enough to see that it would not detract from him to have his name follow that of an inferior.".

In the mid or late 1870s, it was rumored that Stephenson almost killed a man by prescribing the wrong medication. After that time he disappeared from Nevada.

== Omaha ==
He moved to Omaha in the late 1870s. In January, 1876, Edwin R. Overall, William R. Gamble, and Rev W. H. Wilson organized a State Convention of Colored men. The convention met to discuss lynching and to select delegates for the national convention to be held in Nashville later that year. Overall, Dr. W. H. C. Stephenson, Wilson, and Gamble were selected as delegates, with R. D. Curry, John Lewis, Calvin Montgomery, and P. Hampton as alternates. Wilson served as president of the meeting, Curry, Lewis, and J. C. Boone as vice presidents, and Cyrus D. Bell as secretary

In 1879 he organized a meeting along with C. D. Bell and Emanuel S. Clenlans to express the political views of the Omaha black community. The meeting passed resolutions against the unilateral support of blacks to the Republican party. In spite of this independence, he was active in Republican politics. African American Republicans in Omaha met August 18, 1880, elected Stephenson to be among the delegates sent to the state Republican convention. On August 30 of that year, W. H. C. Stephenson along with James O. Adams, Edwin R. Overall, John R. Simpson, and Peter Williams organized a State Convention of Colored Americans.

In Omaha, he was one of the founders of the Zion Baptist Church and was active in anti-lynching activities, for instance speaking out against the lynching of Julia and Frazier Baker in 1898. He was ordained in the African Methodist Episcopal church. He was a member in the Odd Fellows and the Washington Benevolent Association.

== Death ==
Stephenson died April 6, 1899, of lung disease. His funeral was at the St. John African Methodist Episcopal church and he was buried at Forest Lawn Cemetery.
