= William R. Gamble =

American civil rights activist and barber (1850–1910)

- Born: c1850 Mobile, Alabama, U. S.
- Died: April 16, 1910; St. Paul, Minnesota, U. S.
- Occupation: Barber
- Spouse: Eveline

William R. Gamble (c. 1850 – April 16, 1910) was a civil rights activist and barber in Lincoln, Nebraska and Omaha, Nebraska. Gamble was born a slave in Mobile, Alabama in about 1850. His wife, Eveline, had French-Canadian and Native American ancestry. They were married in Lincoln, Nebraska in 1873 and moved to Omaha, Nebraska around 1880. They had eight children. Gamble's oldest daughter Lucinda became Omaha's first black school teacher and eventually married Father John Albert Williams, serving as an active community leader in North Omaha throughout her life. His other children were William, Richard Joseph, Edward, Leonard, Fred, Mary, and George. Gamble died on April 16, 1910.

In January, 1876, Edwin R. Overall, William R. Gamble, and Rev W. H. Wilson organized a State Convention of Colored men. The convention met to discuss lynching and to select delegates for the national convention to be held in Nashville later that year. Overall, Dr. W. H. C. Stephenson, Wilson, and Gamble were selected as delegates, with R. D. Curry, John Lewis, Calvin Montgomery, and P. Hampton as alternates. Wilson served as president of the meeting, Curry, Lewis, and J. C. Boone as vice presidents, and Cyrus D. Bell as secretary, and Gamble, Stephenson, Overall, and Wilson attended the National Convention of Colored Men in Nashville on April 5. W. G. Robinson (Nebraska City), Major Moore (Lincoln), and Gamble (Omaha) were elected as delegates to another National Convention of Colored Men, at Louisville, Ky., September 24, 1883," In 1890, Gamble was a delegate to the first State convention of T. Thomas Fortune's National Afro-American League led locally by Overall.

In an effort to regulate barber shops and improve overall quality, Gamble along with two other barbers, Grant Williams and L. M. Pickett were appointed to a city examining board in 1898, and later that year Gamble joined a state "Barbers' Protective Association", a barbers union, which sought to extend the examining requirement to the state level, among other protections.
