= Lucy Gamble =

American teacher and civic leader (1875–1958)

Lucinda Gamble
- Born: September 8, 1875; Lincoln, Nebraska
- Died: August 23, 1958 (aged 82); Cleveland, Ohio
- Education: Omaha Normal School
- Occupation: Teacher
- Spouse: John Albert Williams

Lucinda (Lucy) Anneford W. Gamble or Gambol (September 8, 1875 – August 23, 1958) was a teacher and civic leader in Omaha, Nebraska. She was the Omaha Public Schools' first black teacher, teaching at Dodge School and Cass School from 1895 to 1901.

Gamble was born in Lincoln, Nebraska, on September 8, 1875, of French Canadian, Native American, and African-American ancestry. Her father, William R. Gamble (died April 16, 1910) was from Mobile, Alabama and moved to Lincoln in 1870 and her mother, Evaline, was born in New Hampshire. They were married in Lincoln in 1873. Lucy was the oldest of eight children and her family moved to Omaha when she was five. She attended Dodge School before transferring to Pacific school, where she graduated in 1889, graduated from Omaha Central High School in June 1893 and graduated from Omaha Normal School, a teaching school, in June 1895.

On the morning of Thursday, June 27, 1901, Gamble married Episcopal Reverend John Albert Williams. They had one son, Worthington, and two daughters, Catherine and Dorothy E. Dorothy was the first black graduate of the University of Nebraska-Omaha on June 5, 1924. Rev. Williams died of a heart attack Saturday afternoon, February 4, 1933.

After graduating from Omaha Normal School, Gamble was assigned to teach at Dodge School, later the site of the Central Police Department. When the Dodge School closed, she transferred to Cass School.

Gamble's service extended beyond the classroom. She served as a delegate to the annual council of the Episcopal Diocese of Nebraska, served for 10 years as the chairman of the board of Omaha's Negro Old People's Home, was on the board of the Omaha chapter of the National Association for the Advancement of Colored People, was on the board for the Omaha Community of Christ, and served on the governing board of the Omaha Community Chest. She was also a prominent member of the Omaha Colored Women's Club led by Ella Mahammitt.

Lucy Gamble Williams died on August 23, 1958, in Cleveland, Ohio.
