= John Albert Williams =

American journalist

- Born: February 28, 1866; London, Ontario, Canada
- Died: February 4, 1933 (aged 66); Omaha, Nebraska, U.S.
- Education: Seabury Divinity School
- Occupations: Minister, Journalist
- Political party: Republican
- Spouse: Lucinda Gambel

Religious life
- Religion: Episcopal

John Albert Williams (February 28, 1866 – February 4, 1933) was a minister, journalist, and political activist in Omaha, Nebraska. He was born to an escaped slave and spoke from the pulpit and the newspapers on issues of civil rights, equality, and racial harmony. He was a highly respected minister, journalist, and civic leader. He served on many committees and boards among Omaha's black community and in the Omaha and Nebraska Episcopal Church.

== Life ==
John Albert Williams was born February 28, 1866, in London, Ontario to Adaline née D'Or and Henry Williams. Henry was a Virginia slave who escaped along the Underground Railroad to London, and Adaline was of French-Canadian and black heritage. He was one of nine children. When John Albert was 11 his family came to Detroit, where he attended Sunday school held by the Father Worthington, who would later be Omaha's Bishop Worthington. He was a boyhood friend of actor Richard B. Harrison, a relationship which would continue throughout their lives. On Worthington's recommendation, he attended Seabury Divinity School in Faribault, Minnesota, graduating on June 3, 1891.

On the morning of Thursday, June 27, 1901, Williams married Lucinda Gamble, daughter of William R. Gamble. Lucy was the first African-American teacher in the Omaha Public Schools, teaching there for six years from 1899 through 1905. He had one son, Worthington (named for the bishop), and two daughters, Catherine and Dorothy E. Dorothy was the first black graduate of the University of Nebraska-Omaha on June 5, 1924.

William's mother died June 18, 1910, of heart failure. In 1929 Williams suffered a minor stroke, and on February 1, 1933, Williams suffered a heart attack, perhaps brought on by the jar when he stepped into a hole in the pavement. He died Saturday afternoon, February 4, 1933. Bishop Shayler of Omaha said service at Trinity Cathedral, and he was buried at Forest Lawn Cemetery.

== Ministry ==
On June 11, 1891, he was ordered to St. Barnabas Church in Omaha to be deacon, and was ordained priest in October of that year at St. Mathias Church in Omaha. He was ordained together with Irving P. Johnson and Paul Matthews, who became bishops of Colorado and New Jersey respectively.

In 1878, Omaha's Episcopal Trinity Mission organized the congregation of St. Philip, the Deacon. The congregation dwindled to 17 by 1890. At that time, St. Barnabas was led by a white priest of the same name, Reverend John Williams. In 1890, John Williams took interest in the congregation and started working with it. In 1891, John Albert Williams was brought to St Philip the Deacon, and in 1893, with a congregation of over 40, a new building was built for the congregation, paid for by the donation of Bishop Worthington's wife, Amelia T. Worthington (née Milton).

In the church, Williams was immediately very successful and quickly became nationally renowned. In April 1895, Williams was invited to succeed reverend Alexander Crummell at St. Luke's in Washington DC and was again asked to come to St. Luke's in 1904. Eventually, Owen M. Waller succeeded Crummell at St. Luke's. He was considered one of the most well-known priests of the Episcopal Church in the country, and in 1929 was entered into the Episcopal Church's Order of the Sangreal. He was a scholar of Latin and Greek, which he tutored at Creighton University, and was given a doctorate by Seabury in 1929. At the diocese level, he served at various times as assistant secretary and secretary-registrar, examining chaplain, and historiographer of the diocese, and edited the diocesan magazine, The Crozier for 12 years. He was nominated for episcopal bishop of Haiti in 1919 and to another missionary bishopric in 1922, but lost both votes. He opposed excess of emotionalism in religion and had intellectual sermon style.

== Activism ==
Williams was very involved in civil rights activism in Omaha. On September 20, 1894, Ida B. Wells came to speak and organize a branch of the anti-lynching league in Omaha. In December 1894 the Anti-Lynching league was founded with Williams as president. In that role, Williams frequently sought to calm Omaha's black community in the face of racial tensions, such as during the Spring Valley, Illinois black-Italian labor war in August 1895. He also was a member of the Afro-American League branch in Omaha and ran for membership of the Omaha Board of Education. He was a member of the Negro Press Association and when the group met in Omaha during the Trans-Mississippi Exposition in August 1898, he was elected secretary of the association.

In August 1906, black members of the Omaha community formed a group called the "Progressive League of Douglas County", Williams president, to pressure the county Republicans to include blacks on the legislative ticket, in particular Millard F. Singleton. His connections with black and civil rights elites brought many speakers to Omaha, including the aforementioned Wells, Joel Elias Spingarn and Robert W. Bagnall. After a visit to Omaha by W. E. B. Du Bois in 1919, he organized and served as president of the state branch of the Omaha branch of the NAACP.

His activism included many different issues frequently speaking from the pulpit and in the press. He spoke out against Jim Crow cars, voted in opposition to prohibition in an episcopal church meeting, he called for calm after the lynching of Willy Brown in 1919, rallied Omaha support of the Dyer Anti-Lynching Bill, and opposed segregated pools. He was a close friend to Harrison J. Pinkett, and with Pinkett, spoke out in favor of black troops discharged in relation to the Brownsville Affair and supported black troops serving in World War I. He served as the first black to be a member of the Omaha Community Chest's governing board, served on the Omaha tornado relief commission in 1913, was treasurer of the Woodson Cultural Center and member of the board of the Omaha branch of the Urban League.

== Journalism ==
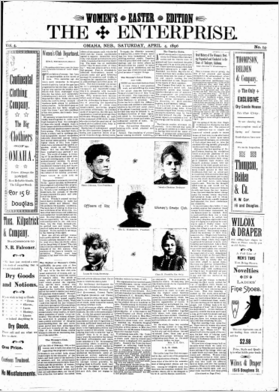
Cover of The Enterprise, April 4, 1896

His words for the public came from other sources than the pulpit, appearing in Omaha and National newspapers. He frequently wrote letters to the editor of Omaha's main papers, the Omaha World-Herald and the Omaha Bee. He also worked in the black press, particularly for Omaha's The Enterprise edited by George F. Franklin and later by Thomas P. Mahammitt. In 1915 he founded what would become Omaha's biggest black paper, the Monitor. The Monitor started as a church paper and branched out as a general black newspaper. The Monitor was an important organ of black thought of the time, occasionally taking outspoken positions. Its pages, for example, asserted that The Bee and another Omaha paper, The Daily News, contributed significantly to racial tension in Omaha around the riots of 1919 with their "biased treatment of blacks". Also, The Monitor supported Marcus Garvey's Universal Negro Improvement Association. Generally, The Monitor was more moderate. George Wells Parker worked for several years for the Monitor before splitting to form the New Era, feeling the Monitor was too moderate and advocating more Pan-Africanist views. Another journalist who wrote for the Monitor was Lucille Skaggs Edwards. The paper ceased publishing in 1929.
