= Silas Robbins =

American lawyer

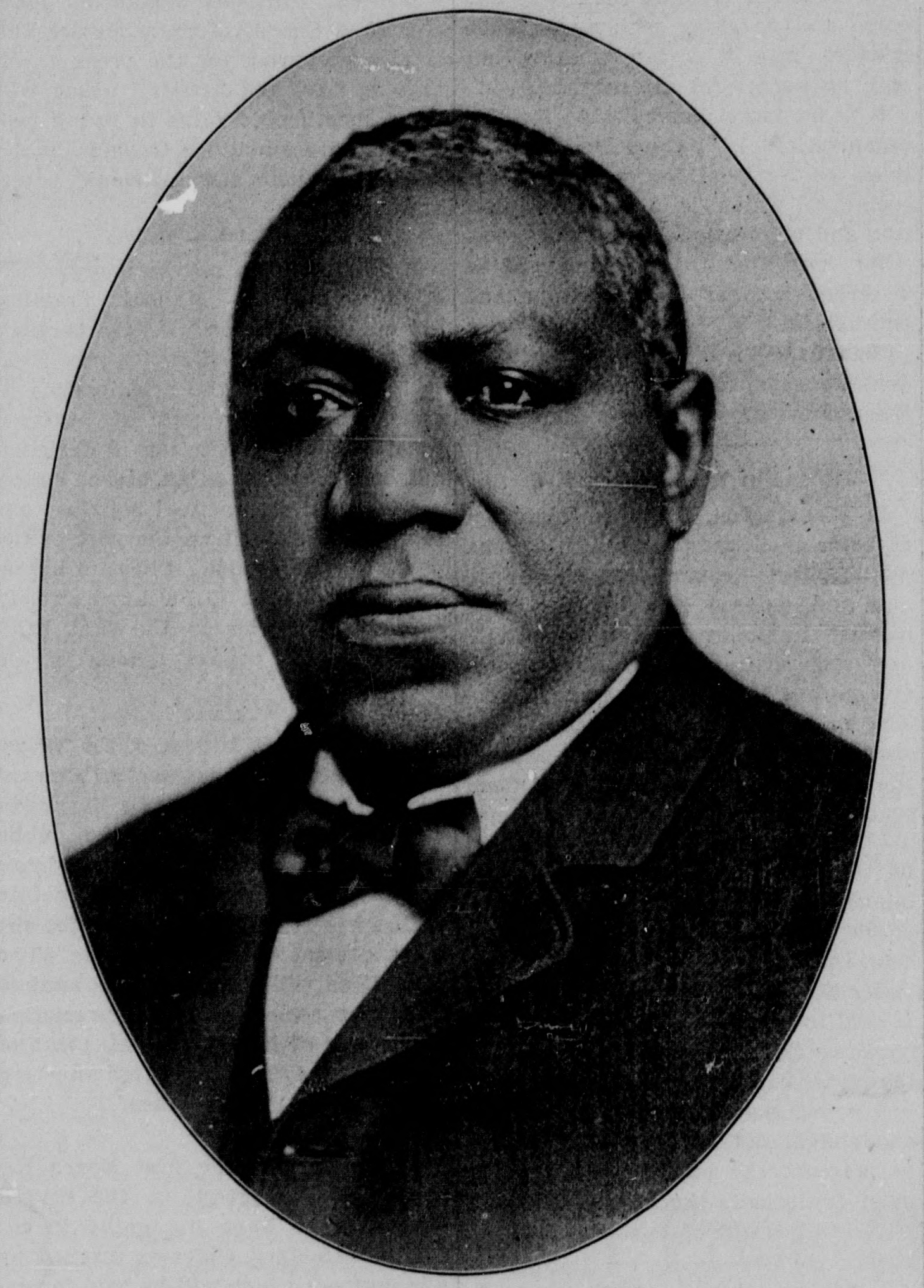
- Born: February 14, 1857
- Died: September 11, 1916 (aged 59); Omaha, Nebraska, US
- Occupation: Lawyer

Silas Robbins (February 14, 1857 – September 11, 1916) was the first African American admitted to practice law in the U.S. state of Nebraska in 1889, and the first Black person in Omaha, Nebraska to be admitted to the Nebraska State Bar Association.

== Biography ==
Prior to serving in Nebraska, Robbins was admitted to the bar in Indiana and Mississippi.

In 1887 Robbins became the second African American to run for Nebraska State Legislature, winning the endorsement of Gilbert Hitchcock's Omaha World-Herald. After losing the race, Robbins continued to serve in Omaha.

In 1889 Robbins became the first Black lawyer admitted to practice in Nebraska, sixteen years after the Nebraska Supreme Court ruled that Black people could not be excluded from serving on juries. In 1892 he became the first African American to be listed on the Douglas County Bar Association. In 1893 he secured a patent from the United States Patent Office for a game he created called "politics".

One of Robbins' most famous cases was the 1890 habeas corpus petition of a young man named Till, who was being enslaved in Filmore County almost thirty years after the Emancipation Proclamation legally ended slavery. The case was featured in newspapers at the time, and was settled in Till's favor outside of court.

In 1898, Robbins was appointed to the Mixed Congress. Governor Silas Holcomb appointed Robbins to this position, and Robbins attended several Mixed Congress events.

When the Populist Party took power in Omaha, Robbins served as the tax commissioner from 1900 to 1901 and again from 1903 to 1905. Afterward he focused primarily on real estate law, and maintained a reputation as one of Omaha's "best known colored attorneys."

Robbins committed suicide on September 11, 1916, by a self-inflicted gunshot wound to the temple, apparently motivated by a long-term illness.

== See also ==
- African Americans in Omaha, Nebraska
