= National Afro-American League =

US civil rights organization

The National Afro-American League was formed on January 25, 1890, by Timothy Thomas Fortune. Preceding the foundation of the National Association for the Advancement of Colored People (NAACP), the organization dedicated itself to racial solidarity and self-help.

In September 1898, Fortune presided at a meeting in Rochester, New York, called by A.M.E. Zion Bishop Alexander Walters, for the purpose of rejuvenating the League. The new organization, the National Afro-American Council, existed until about 1908. Walters was the first president of the council, while Fortune was the first chairman of the executive committee.

Many who originally supported the League and later, the council, eventually started donating to the NAACP, which later became one of the most powerful anti-segregation groups.

== See also ==
- Jim Crow laws
- Niagara Movement

== Sources ==
- Alexander, Shawn Leigh. An Army of Lions: The Civil Rights Struggle Before the NAACP. University of Pennsylvania Press, 2011
