= List of people from North Omaha, Nebraska =

There are a number of notable people from North Omaha, Nebraska. This list includes people who lived in the community for any period of time, as well as groups and organizations of people within North Omaha.

== Political ==
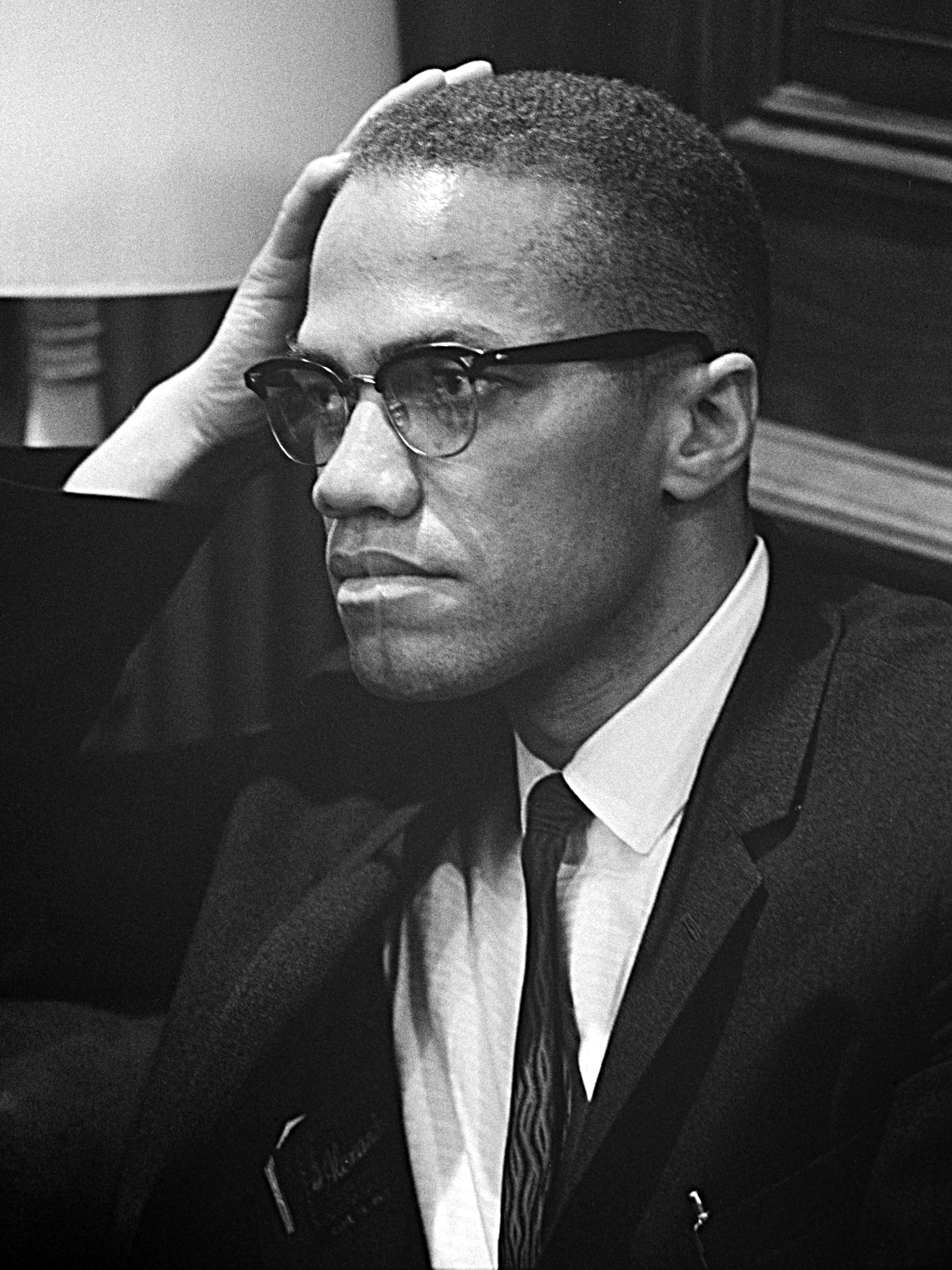
The young Malcolm X

Being born in Omaha doesn't make me an American any more than being born in an oven makes a cat a biscuit. - Malcolm X

- John Adams, Jr., first African American elected to the Nebraska Legislature after it became a unicameral, Nebraska state senator
- Ernie Chambers, Nebraska state senator, historical North Omaha community leader
- Brenda Council, city councilmember
- Gladys Harrison, primary candidate for the U.S. House of Representatives
- Lowen Kruse, Nebraska state senator
- Aaron Manasses McMillan, Nebraska state senator, founder of the Peoples Hospital in North Omaha
- George Wells Parker, founder of Hamitic League of the World
- John Grant Pegg, Weights and Measure Inspector, 1910–1916, Omaha
- Dr. Matthew Ricketts, first African American elected to the Nebraska Legislature, Nebraska state senator
- Silas Robbins, first African American lawyer in Omaha
- Joe Rogers, Colorado lieutenant governor, 1999-2003 (Republican)
- Standing Bear, imprisoned and tried at Fort Omaha in Standing Bear v. Crook
- Susette LaFlesche Tibbles, Ponca member associated with the Standing Bear v. Crook trial
- Thomas Tibbles, journalist associated with the Standing Bear v. Crook trial
- Malcolm X, civil rights leader
- Whitney Young, former head of Omaha Urban League

== Stage, film, theater and dance ==
- John Beasley, television and film actor
- Gabrielle Union, television and film actress

== Literary ==
- Mildred D. Brown, founder of Omaha Star, the oldest and perhaps the only African American newspaper founded by a woman
- Tillie Olsen, Jewish author
- Wallace Thurman, considered one of the greatest writers of the Harlem Renaissance

== Music ==
- Lester Abrams, funk musician
- Wynonie Harris, rhythm & blues singer
- Lloyd Hunter, big band leader
- Preston Love, jazz player
- Buddy Miles, musician
- Geneice Wilcher, beauty pageant winner
- Big Joe Williams, musician
- Anna Mae Winburn, big band leader
- Helen Jones Woods, big band trombonist

== Business ==
- Mildred Brown, founder of Omaha Star newspaper
- Warren Buffett, business magnate, investor, and philanthropist
- Edward Creighton, pioneer businessman
- John A. Creighton, pioneer businessman, philanthropist
- Cathy Hughes, founder and president of Radio One
- Manuel Lisa, fur trapper, founder of Fort Lisa

== Sports ==
- Houston Alexander, mixed martial arts fighter
- Bob Boozer, former National Basketball Association player and gold medalist at the 1960 Summer Olympics
- Terence Crawford, World Champion Boxer
- Bob Gibson, National Baseball Hall of Fame pitcher for St. Louis Cardinals
- Ahman Green, professional football player
- Kenton Keith, professional football player
- Ron Prince, former head football coach at Kansas State University
- Johnny Rodgers, 1972 Heisman Trophy winner, College Football Hall of Fame Inductee, voted Nebraska's "player of the century"
- Gale Sayers, professional football player, Pro Football Hall of Fame inductee

== Military ==
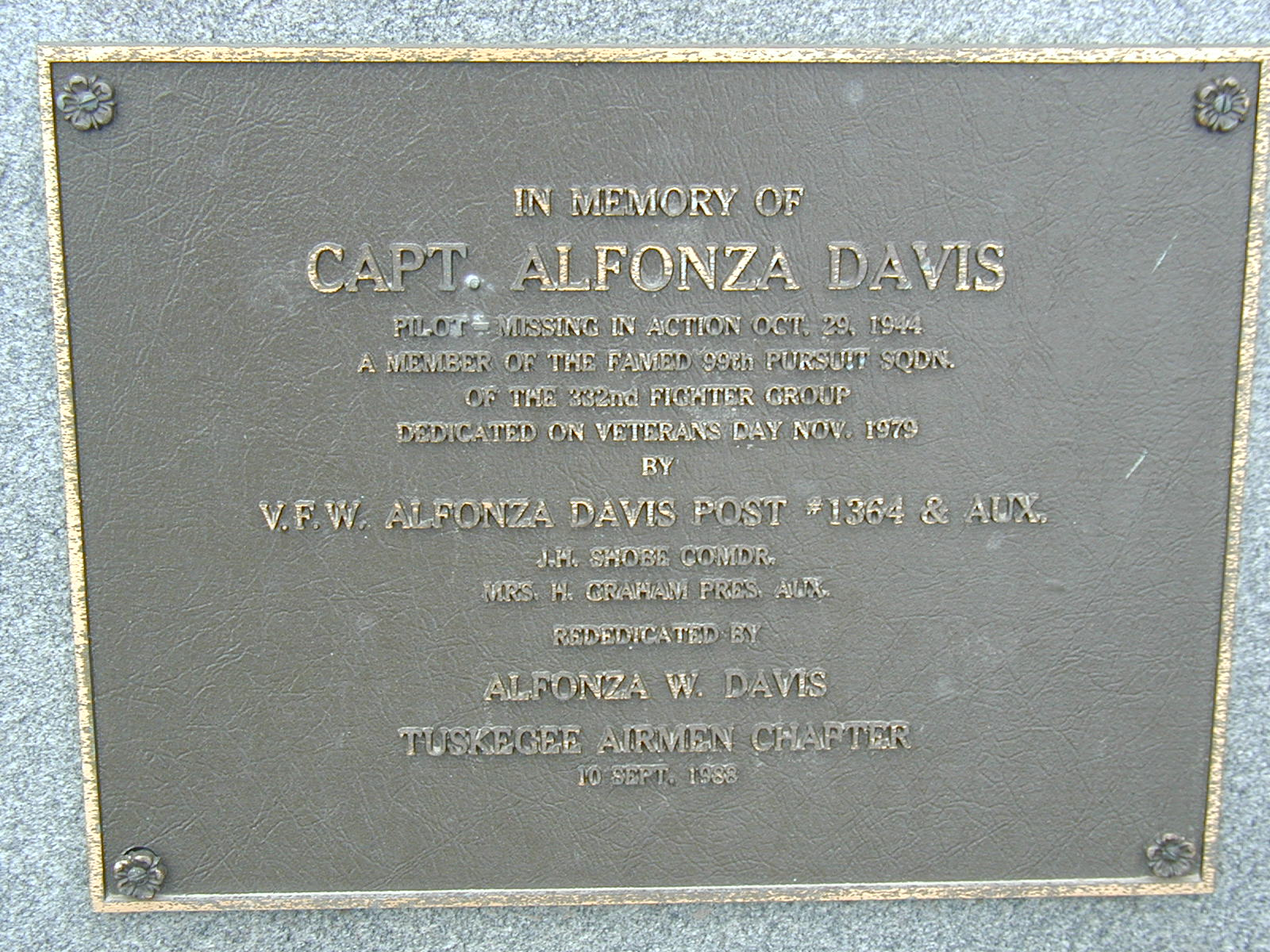
Plaque commemorating Alfonza W. Davis

- George Crook, leader of Fort Omaha
- Alfonza W. Davis, captain in the Tuskegee Airmen; born 1918 in North Omaha, graduate of Technical High School (Omaha, Nebraska), graduate of Omaha University, member of Kappa Alpha Psi; first black military aviator from Omaha to receive his wings from Tuskegee Field; KIA over Germany in 1944
- Benjamin Foulois, stationed at Fort Omaha Balloon School
- Stuart Heintzelman, stationed at Fort Omaha
- Dan Christie Kingman, stationed at Fort Omaha
- Frank Purdy Lahm, stationed at Fort Omaha Balloon School
- Thomas Selfridge, stationed at Fort Omaha Balloon School

== Cultural ==
- Alfred S. Barnett, journalist
- Ferdinand Barnett, newspaper publisher and journalist
- Cyrus D. Bell, newspaper publisher
- Buffalo Bill, founded his Wild West Show in North Omaha
- James Bryant, journalist
- Bertha Calloway, founded the Great Plains Black History Museum
- Ophelia Clenlans, journalist
- Lucille Skaggs Edwards, journalist
- Thomas Rogers Kimball, early Omaha architect; designed Webster Telephone Exchange Building and several other significant buildings in North Omaha
- Sarah Helen Mahammitt, cookbook author and cooking school operator
- Rowena Moore, founder of the Malcolm X House Site
- George Wells Parker, journalist, poet, historian, community leader
- Ken Vavrina, influential liberal activist priest in North Omaha
- Clarence W. Wigington, first African American municipal architect in the U.S; raised and began his career in Omaha
- Rev. John Albert Williams, newspaper publisher, journalist and Episcopal minister

== Other ==
- Joe Coe, local worker lynched by white mob
- Jack Broomfield, locally significant community figure
- Willy Brown, local worker lynched by white mob

== See also ==
- List of people from Omaha, Nebraska
- African Americans in Omaha, Nebraska
