= African Americans in Omaha, Nebraska =

African Americans in Omaha, Nebraska, are central to the development and growth of the 41st most populous city in the United States. While population statistics show almost constantly increasing percentages of Black people living in the city since it was founded in 1854, Black people in Omaha have not been represented equitably in the city's political, social, cultural, economic or educational circumstances since. In the 2020s, the city's African American population is transforming the city's landscape through community investment, leadership and other initiatives.

== Early history ==
First recorded in the Omaha area in 1804, Black people have been present throughout the community for more than 220 years. Black people are first recorded arriving in the area that became the city when York came through in 1804 with the Lewis and Clark expedition and the residence of Jean Baptiste Point du Sable who lived at Fort Lisa for an extended period in 1810. There were also enslaved Black people at the Winter Quarters of the Church of Jesus Christ of Latter-day Saints in 1846. The first free Black settler in the city arrived in 1854, the year the city was incorporated.

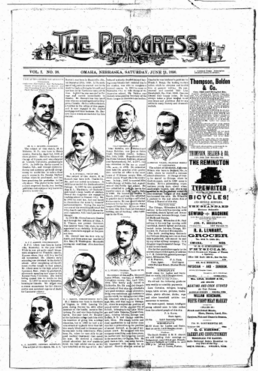

In 1894 black residents of Omaha organized the first fair in the United States for African-American exhibitors and attendees. The 2000 US Census recorded 51,910 African Americans as living in Omaha (over 13% of the city's population). In the 19th century, the growing city of Omaha attracted ambitious people making new lives, such as Dr. Matthew Ricketts and Silas Robbins. Dr. Ricketts was the first African American to graduate from a Nebraska college or university. Silas Robbins was the first African American to be admitted to the bar in Nebraska. In 1892 Dr. Ricketts was also the first African American to be elected to the Nebraska State Legislature. Ernie Chambers, an African-American barber from North Omaha's 11th District, became the longest serving state senator in Nebraska history in 2005 after serving in the unicameral for more than 35 years.

Because of its industrial jobs with the railroads and meatpacking industries, Omaha was the city on the Plains that attracted the most African-American migrants from the South in the Great Migration of the early 20th century. By 1910, it had the third largest black population among western cities after Los Angeles and Denver, and from 1910 to 1920, the African-American population in Omaha doubled to more than 10,000 as new migrants were attracted by jobs in the expanding meatpacking industry. More than 70 percent were from the South. Of western cities, in 1920, only Los Angeles had a greater population of blacks than Omaha, with nearly 16,000. Reflecting the concentration of people and vital community, in 1915, the Lincoln Motion Picture Company was founded in Omaha. It was the first film company owned by African Americans. Like several other major industrial cities during the "Red Summer of 1919", Omaha suffered a race riot. It was marked by the lynching of Will Brown, a black worker, and the deaths of two white men. The violence erupted out of job competition and postwar social tensions among working-class groups, aggravated by sensational journalism in the city. In the aftermath of the riot, the city's residential patterns became more segregated. By the 1920s, a vibrant African-American musical and entertainment culture had developed in the city.

While African Americans were already concentrated in North Omaha, in the 1930s redlining and race restrictive covenants reinforced their staying there without options for years to move to newer housing. In the 1930s and 1940s African Americans were part of successful interracial organizing teams in the meatpacking industry. They succeeded in creating the integrated United Meatpacking Workers of America union and gained an end to segregated jobs in the industry. The union helped support integration of public facilities in the 1950s and the civil rights movement in the 1960s. During this period, activists worked both for local and national changes; they contributed to improving conditions for African Americans in Omaha. Mid-century massive restructuring in railroads and the meatpacking industry cost the city more than 10,000 jobs. African Americans were particularly affected by the loss of industrial jobs. Those who could migrated for work in other areas and problems increased among the remaining population in North Omaha.

Omaha has the fifth-highest African-American poverty rate among the nation's 100 largest cities, with more than one in three black residents in Omaha living below the poverty line. The city ranks number one in the United States by the number of black children that live in poverty, with nearly six of 10 black kids living below the poverty line. Only one other metropolitan area in the U.S., Minneapolis, has a wider economic disparity between blacks and whites.

== Population history ==
The first recorded instance of a black person in the Omaha area occurred in 1804. "York" was a slave belonging to William Clark of the Lewis and Clark Expedition. The presence of several black people, probably slaves, was recorded in the area comprising North Omaha today when Major Stephen H. Long's expedition arrived at Fort Lisa in September 1819. They reportedly lived at the post and in neighboring farmsteads.

=== 19th century ===
After a short history of slavery in Nebraska, the first free black person to live in Omaha was Sally Bayne, who moved to Omaha in 1854. A clause in the original proposed Nebraska State Constitution from 1854 limited voting rights in the state to "free white males", which kept Nebraska from entering the Union for almost a year. In the 1860s, the U.S. Census showed 81 "Negroes" in Nebraska, ten of whom were accounted for as slaves. At that time, the majority of the population lived in Omaha and Nebraska City.

Some of the earliest African-American residents of the city may have arrived by the Underground Railroad via a small log cabin outside of Nebraska City built by Allen Mayhew in 1855. It is honored today as the Mayhew Cabin Museum. One report says, "Henry Daniel Smith, born in Maryland in 1835, still living in Omaha in 1913 and working at his trade of broom-maker, was one escaped slave who entered Nebraska via the Underground Railroad."

By 1867 enough blacks gathered in community to found St. John's African Methodist Episcopal Church in the Near North Side neighborhood. It was the first church for African Americans in Nebraska. The first recorded birth of an African American in Omaha occurred in 1872, when William Leper was born.

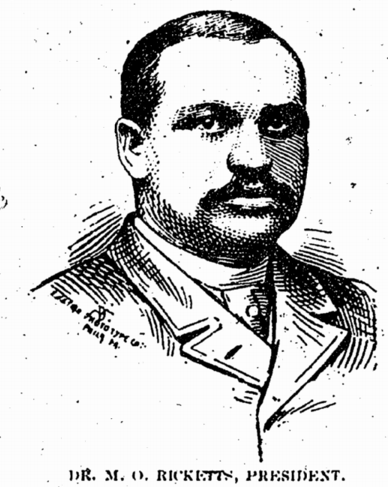
Matthew Rickets in 1890

Before Omaha's African-American residents gathered in North Omaha, they lived dispersed throughout the city. By 1880 there were nearly 800 black residents, many recruited by Union Pacific Railroad as strikebreakers. By 1884 there three black churches had been founded. By 1900 there were 3,443 black residents, in a total city population of 102,555.

Black men and women quickly formed social and community organizations, such as the Women's Club in 1895, devoted to education, respectability and reform. In addition, the community began to create its own newspapers, such as the Progress, the Afro-American Sentinel and The Enterprise in the 1880s and 1890s.

Blacks also quickly distinguished themselves in public life: in 1892 Dr. Matthew Ricketts was the first black person elected to serve in the Nebraska Legislature and in 1895 Silas Robbins was the first black lawyer admitted to the Nebraska State Bar Association.

=== 20th century ===
At the turn of the 20th century, two African-American physicians, doctors Riddle and Madison, opened a hospital for African Americans. Citizens could not afford the facility and it failed financially. Reared in Omaha, Clarence W. Wigington was the first black architect to design a home in Nebraska as a student of Thomas Rogers Kimball. He also designed churches in Omaha. Wigington gained a national reputation after moving to Saint Paul, Minnesota, in 1914, where he soon became the senior architectural designer for the city. His legacy includes 60 surviving buildings, among which four are listed on the National Register of Historic Places.

John Grant Pegg was the Leading Colored Republican of the Western States Meet in Conference. In 1906, he was appointed as the City Weights and Measures Inspector by J. C. Dalhman, Mayor of Omaha 1910. Pegg held the post for 10 years until his death in 1916. He encouraged and sponsored many of the black settlers who went by wagon out to Cherry County, Nebraska, to homestead benefiting from The Kincaid Homestead Act of 1904, where a black colony was established and where his brother, Charles T. Pegg, lived.

In 1912, the Omaha chapter of the National Association for the Advancement of Colored People, the first NAACP chapter west of the Mississippi. George Wells Parker, a founder of the Afrocentric Hamitic League of the World, was instrumental in recruiting African Americans from the Deep South to Omaha during the 1910s.

Railroads and the meatpacking industry recruited African American workers from the South. From 1910 to 1920, the African-American population of Omaha doubled from 4,426 to 10,315, making up five percent of Omaha's population. Of the western cities which were new destinations for blacks of the Great Migration, in 1920 Omaha had the second-largest black population, after Los Angeles. The rapid pace of growth alarmed some people in the city, which was also absorbing thousands of new eastern and southern European immigrants. People were concerned about social problems: labor unrest following strikes in 1917, and the return of veterans looking for work after World War I.

During the first week of August 1919, the Omaha Bee newspaper reported that as many as 500 "Negro" workers, mostly from Chicago and East St. Louis, arrived in Omaha to seek employment in the packinghouses. The Bee tended to sensational journalism, adding to tensions in the city as it highlighted alleged crimes committed by blacks. The migration of African Americans to Omaha and the hiring of black workers created a source of friction in the local labor market. Blacks had been hired as strikebreakers in 1917, and there was a major strike among white workers in 1919. The immigrant workers in the meatpacking industry resented the strikebreakers. Economic pressure exacerbated hostilities.

From 1910 to the 1950s, Omaha was a destination for African Americans during the Great Migration from the American South. An African-American cultural expansion flourished beginning in the 1920s, part of a larger boom time in the Prohibition era. A late 20th-century documentary reported about the 1940s, "On the surface the black community appeared quite stable. Its center was a several-block district north of the downtown. There were over a hundred black-owned businesses, and there were a number of black physicians, dentists, and attorneys. Over twenty fraternal organizations and clubs flourished. Church life was diverse. Of more than forty denominations, Methodists and Baptists predominated."

== Neighborhoods ==
Early African American neighborhoods in Omaha included Casey's Row, a community of housing for African-American families, most of whose men worked as railroad porters at the nearby Union Pacific Railroad. The steady jobs on the railroads were considered good work, even if some men had greater ambitions. In the 1880s, Omaha's original "Negro district" was located at Twentieth and Harney Streets. The Near North Side, located immediately north of Downtown Omaha, is where the majority of African Americans have lived in Omaha for almost 100 years. Originally the community had mostly European immigrants: Germans, Italians and Jews and gradually drew more African Americans. In pre-1900 Omaha, the city's cemetery was always integrated.

The community became more racially segregated soon after the Omaha Race Riot of 1919. During that event an African-American worker named Will Brown was lynched by a white mob outside the Douglas County Courthouse. After the mob finished with Brown, they turned against the entire population of African Americans in the Near North Side; however, their efforts were thwarted by soldiers from Fort Omaha. In the following years the city began enforcing race-restrictive covenants. Properties for rent and sale were restricted on the basis of race, with the primary intent of keeping the Near North Side "black" and the rest of the city "white". These agreements were held in place with redlining, a system of segregated insuring and lending reinforced by the federal government. These restrictions were ruled illegal in 1940.

During the 1930s, the Federal government built housing projects for working families: the Logan Fontenelle Housing Projects in North Omaha and a similar project in South Omaha. Both were intended to improve housing for the large working-class community, whose majority then were immigrants from Eastern and Southern Europe and their descendants. With job losses and demographic changes accelerating in the late 1950s and 1960s, the project residents in North Omaha became nearly all poor and low-income African Americans. By the early first decade of the 21st century, each of these facilities was torn down and replaced with public housing schemes featuring mixed-income and supporting uses.

Today, the 24th and Lake Historic District is widely recognized as the historic heart of Omaha's African American community.

African-American neighborhoods in Omaha have been studied extensively; the most notable reports include Lois Mark Stalvey's Three to Get Ready: The Education of a White Family in Inner City Schools, and the 1966 documentary film A Time for Burning. This movie featured the opinions of the young Ernie Chambers. A barber, Chambers went on to law school and has been repeatedly elected to represent North Omaha in the Nebraska State Legislature for more than 35 years.

== Occupations ==
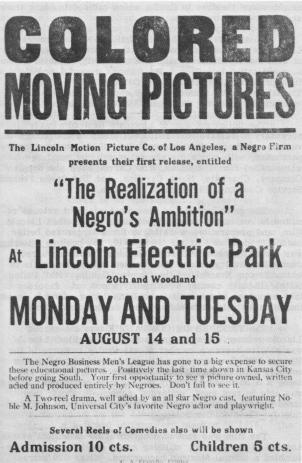
Poster: The Realization of a Negro's Ambition (1916)

The Union Pacific Railroad first introduced large numbers of African American strikebreakers to Omaha during a strike in 1877. Black barbers organized the first labor union in Omaha, and went on strike in Omaha in 1887 after they deemed it "unprofessional to work beside white competitors". Arriving in 1890, Dr. Stephenson was the first African-American physician in Omaha and the start of a substantial professional class. Matthew Ricketts was the first African-American medical student to graduate from the University of Nebraska Medical College and settled in North Omaha to set up his practice. In 1892, Dr. Ricketts was the first African American elected to a seat in the Nebraska State Legislature. According to the Works Progress Administration, the first African-American fair held in the United States took place in Omaha, July 3–4, 1894. Their study reports: "Only Negro-owned horses were entered in the races, and all exhibits were restricted to articles made or owned by Negroes."

African Americans also built a "Colored Old Folks Home" in North Omaha in the 1910s and sustained it for a long period of time. Clarence W. Wigington was a renowned African-American architect from Omaha. He designed St. John's A.M.E. and the Broomfield Rowhouse, among many others in the city, but built most of his career after 1914 in St. Paul, Minnesota.

Miss Lucy Gamble, later known as Mrs. John Albert Williams, was the first African-American teacher in the Omaha Public Schools, teaching there for six years from 1899 through 1905. The first film company controlled by Black filmmakers was founded in Omaha in the summer of 1915. George and Noble Johnson founded the Lincoln Motion Picture Company to produce films for African-American audiences. Noble was a small-time actor; George worked for the post office. Noble Johnson was president of the company; Clarence A. Brooks, secretary; Dr. James T. Smith, treasurer; and Dudley A. Brooks was assistant secretary. Lincoln Films quickly built a reputation for making films that showcased African-American talent in the full sphere of cinema. In less than a year the company relocated to Los Angeles, where the major film industry was located.

Today African Americans own fifty percent of all minority-owned businesses in Omaha.

== Politics ==
From a slow start in the late 19th century, in the mid-20th century on, African Americans began to win more seats and appointments in politics, with their participation steadily growing. More people obtained higher education and entered professional middle classes.

In 1892, Dr. Matthew Ricketts became the first African American elected to the Nebraska State Legislature, and was the acknowledged leader of the African-American community in Omaha. After he left Omaha in 1903, Jack Broomfield, proprietor of a notorious bar in downtown Omaha, became the leader of the community. He is criticized for having allowed the community to fall apart under the influence of Tom Dennison.

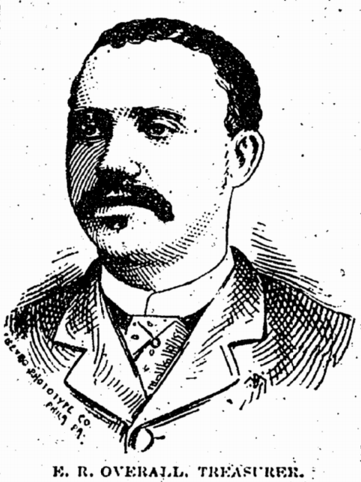
Edwin Overall in 1890

No African Americans served on the Omaha City Council or Douglas County Board of Commissioners until district elections became law. In 1893 Edwin R. Overall, a mail carrier, ran as a Populist for the City Council. He finished 18th in a field of 23 candidates running at-large for nine of 18 council seats. In 1973 and 1977, Fred Conley ran for the Omaha City Council in the at-large format and each time finished 18th – just as Overall did some 70 years earlier. At-large elections were won by candidates who represented the majority population of the city, which was white.

In 1981, after City Council elections were changed to be based on district representation, Conley became the first African American elected. He served until 1989. In 1992, Carol Woods Harris became the first African American elected to the Douglas County Board and served until 2004.

African Americans have been represented on the Omaha School Board since 1950 when attorney Elizabeth Davis Pittman was elected. De facto school segregation, however, persisted in Omaha long after that date with school boundaries tailored to match residential areas, which had de facto segregation.

Brenda Warren Council, a former member of the Omaha School Board and the City Council, narrowly lost the 1997 mayoral election, losing by 700 votes to Mayor Hal Daub. In 2003 Thomas Warren, Brenda Council's brother, was appointed by Mayor Mike Fahey as the city's first African-American Chief of Police for the Omaha Police Department.

In 2005, Marlon Polk was appointed by Governor Dave Heineman to serve as a District Court Judge, the first African American to do so in Nebraska. He was assigned to serve in Douglas County. In 1970 Ernie Chambers became the city's second African American elected to the state legislature. Chambers has won every election since then, and in 2007 became the longest-serving Nebraska Senator in history. In 2005 the Nebraska State Legislature approved a term limit law limiting legislators to two terms, forcing Chambers from office in 2008.

=== African-American firefighters ===
Hose Company #12, and later Hose Company #11, hired the first African-American firefighters in the city. One of these stations was located at 20th and Lake Streets. One of the first African-American firefighters in Omaha was James C. Greer Sr. who was a member of the Omaha Fire Department from May 5, 1906, to August 1, 1933, and was a captain in the department for many years. Horse-drawn wagons were in use when he was assigned to the old No. 11 Station at Thirtieth and Spaulding Streets. He later served at the No. 4 Station at Sixteenth and Izard Streets. He retired as senior captain from the Omaha Fire Department in 1933. His son Richard N. Greer served as a volunteer for the fire department in the 1950s.

The first step towards integration in Omaha's Fire Department came in 1940, when an African-American firefighter was assigned to the city's Bureau of Fire Prevention and Inspection. By the 1950s, the city had two companies of African-American firefighters. Omaha's Fire Department was integrated in 1957.

== African-American culture ==
=== Religious institutions ===
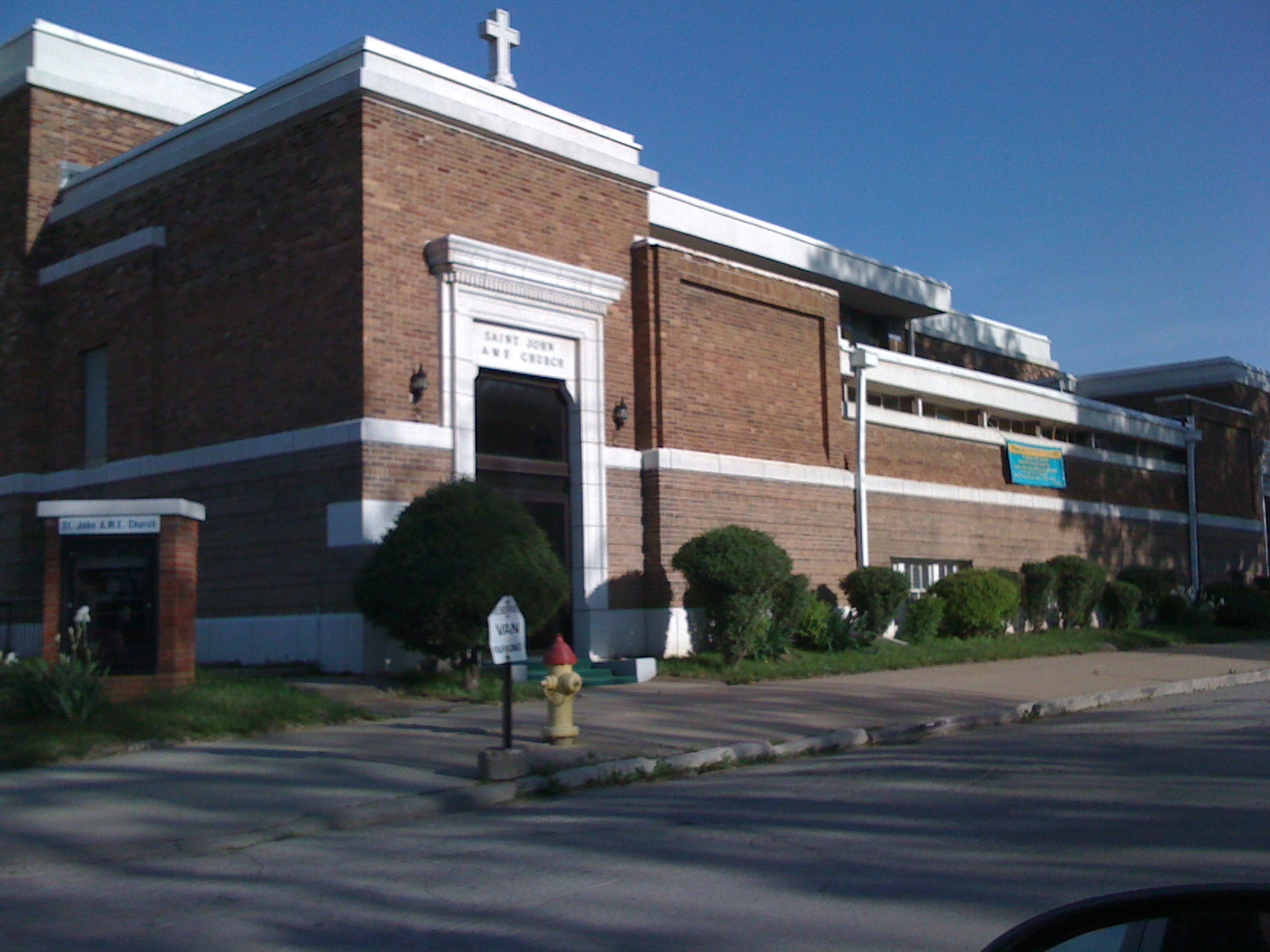

The earliest African-American churches in Omaha were St. John's African Methodist Episcopal Church, organized in 1867; St. Phillip the Deacon Episcopal Church, organized in 1878, Mt. Moriah Baptist Church, organized in 1887 and Zion Baptist Church, organized in 1888. The second St. John's building and Zion's current building were designed by future master architect Clarence Wigington. St. John's current building is a notable example of the Prairie School architectural style.

In 1921, the Omaha and Council Bluffs Colored Ministerial Alliance demanded that Tom Dennison's cabarets in the Sporting District "wherein there is unwarranted mingling of the races" be closed indefinitely. It is unknown what their objectives were.

Other influential churches included Calvin Memorial Presbyterian Church, which opened in 1954 as an integrated congregation. Omaha had several interesting examples of integration in its churches, including those featured the documentary film A Time for Burning and Pearl Memorial United Methodist Church, which began integration efforts in the 1970s. Sacred Heart Catholic Church has operated since the late 19th century and has evolved numerous times as different ethnic groups succeeded each other in the neighborhood. North Omaha's Lizzie Robinson founded the first Church of God in Christ congregation in Nebraska in the 1920s. Salem Baptist Church has been particularly important in the city's African-American community, hosting Martin Luther King Jr. in a major speaking event in Omaha in 1957.

Mt Moriah Baptist Church now houses the Moriah Heritage Center which contains a digital history of the African American Church in North Omaha.

=== Historical social clubs ===
The African-American community in North Omaha was anchored with numerous important social clubs. According to one report from the 1930s, "There are today in Omaha alone some twenty-five clubs and societies with a total membership of over two thousand." These groups included the Pleasant Hour Club (which was estimated to be 50 years old in the late 1930s), Aloha Club, Entre Nous Club, the Beau Brummels Club, the Dames Club, the Jolly Twenty Club, the Trojan Club, and the Quack Club. Important locations included the North Side YWCA. This influential organization, starting in 1920, was located in a house at 2306 N. 22nd Street The African-American community in Omaha also supported the Old Colored Folks' Home, which was organized in 1913. In 1923 they received funds from the city's "Community Chest" fund, with which they purchased a building.

The Royal Circle was a premier African-American social organization. It held annual cotillions for young African-American women through the early 1960s, at which they were "introduced" to adult society. Formed in 1918, the War Camp Community Service became the local American Legion the following year. The Centralized Commonwealth Civic Club, formed in 1937, promoted community business. Two local Boy Scout troops (Troop 23, Troop 79) were founded for African-American youth.

The community also boasted halls for the Odd Fellows, the Masons, (which had about 550 members in North Omaha in 1936), and the Elks, (with about 250 members in the community in 1936). Perhaps the most elusive organization in North Omaha was the Knights and Daughters of Tabor, also known as the "Knights of Liberty". This was a secret African-American organization whose goal was "nothing less than the destruction of slavery".

=== Historic entertainment venues ===
From the 1920s through to the early 1960s, North Omaha boasted a vibrant African-American entertainment district, featuring both local and nationally known musicians. The most important venue in the area was the Dreamland Ballroom, opened in 1923 in the Jewell Building at 24th and Grant Streets. Dreamland hosted some of the greatest jazz, blues, and swing performers, including Duke Ellington, Count Basie, Louis Armstrong, Lionel Hampton, and the original Nat King Cole Trio. Whitney Young spoke there as well. Other venues included Jim Bell's Harlem, opened in 1935 on Lake Street, west of 24th; McGill's Blue Room, located at 24th and Lake, and; Allen's Showcase Lounge, which was located at 24th and Lake.

The Ritz Theater was opened in the mid-1930s at 2041 North 24th Street, near Patrick Avenue. It was specifically designated an "African-American theater" with seating for 548 people. It was closed in the 1950s and has since been demolished.

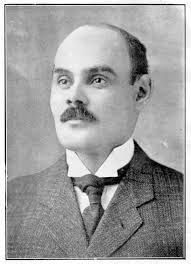
Dan Desdunes in 1911

During this period, North Omaha and its main artery of North 24th Street were the heart of the city's African-American cultural and business community, with a thriving jazz and rhythm & blues scene that attracted top-flight swing, blues and jazz bands from across the country. Due to racial segregation, musicians such as Cab Calloway stayed at Myrtle Washington's at 22nd and Willis, while others stayed at Charlie Trimble's at 22nd and Seward. Early North Omaha bands included Lewis' Excelsior Brass Band, Dan Desdunes Band, Simon Harrold's Melody Boys, the Sam Turner Orchestra, the Ted Adams Orchestra, the Omaha Night Owls, Red Perkins and his Original Dixie Ramblers, and the Lloyd Hunter Band who, in 1931, became the first Omaha band to record. A Lloyd Hunter concert poster can be seen on display at the Community Center in nearby Mineola, Iowa.

The intersection of 24th and Lake was the setting of the Big Joe Williams song "Omaha Blues". Omaha-born Wynonie Harris, one of the founders of rock and roll, got his start at the North Omaha clubs, and for a time lived in the now-demolished Logan Fontenelle Housing Project. There were many African-American churches, social and civic clubs, formal dances for young people, and many other cultural activities.

Several accounts attribute the decline of the African-American cultural scene in North Omaha to the riots of the 1960s and 70s. Television also took away from local entertainment. Since the turn of the 21st century, there has been a resurgence in interest in this vibrant period, with cultural and historical institutions created to honor it, such as Love's Jazz & Art Center, the Dreamland Project, and the Omaha Black Music Hall of Fame.

=== Historic musicians ===
Preston Love, who left Omaha to tour nationally, said,

North Omaha used to be a hub for black jazz musicians, 'the triple-A league' where national bands would go to find a player to fill out their ensemble.

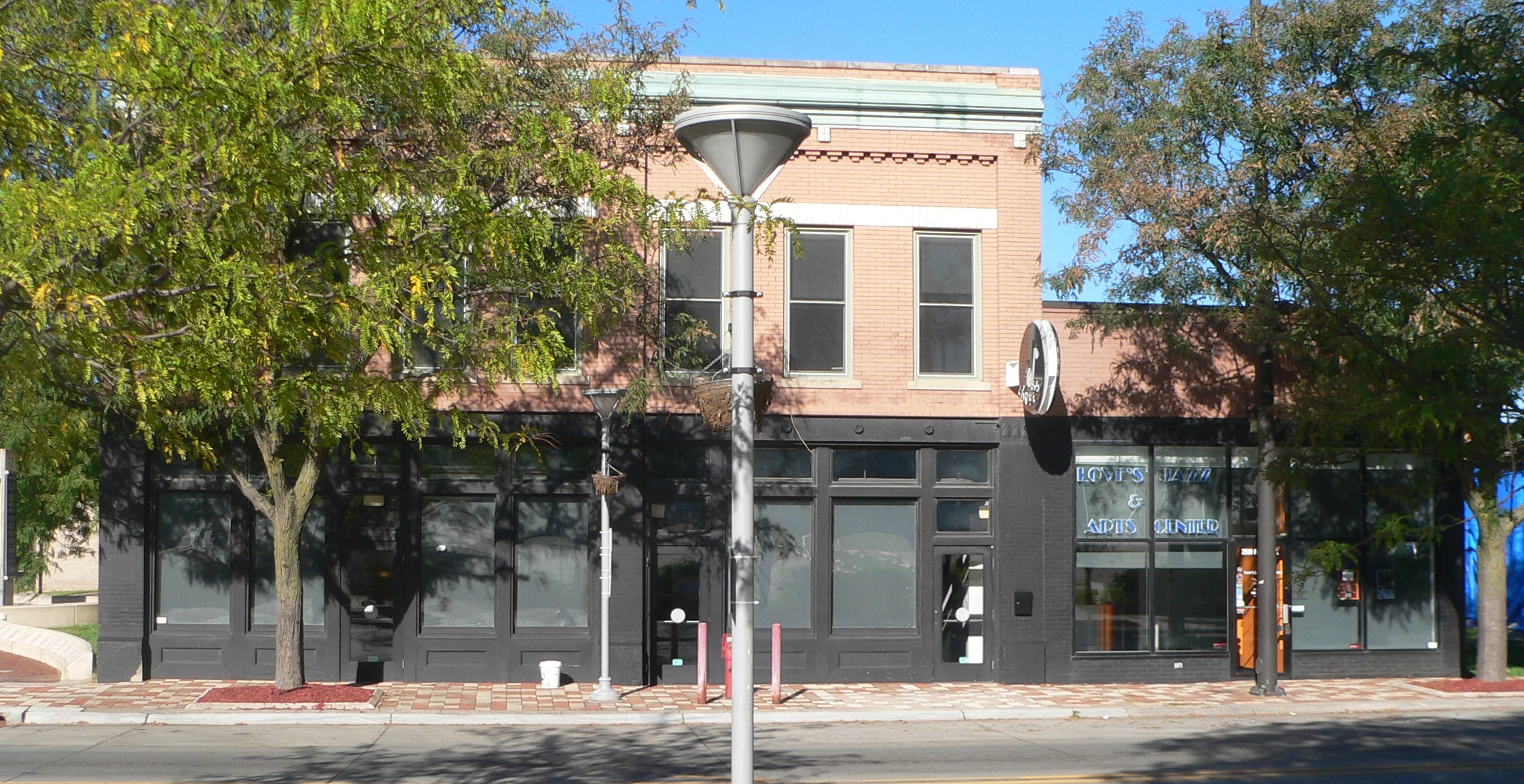

The history of African Americans and music in Omaha is long and varied. The black music community was first organized in the early 20th century by Josiah Waddle, one of Omaha's first barbers. After teaching himself to play a number of brass instruments, Waddle pulled together Omaha's first African American band in 1902. In 1917 he brought together the first women's band in Omaha. One of his most famous students was Lloyd Hunter, who ran one of the most popular orchestras' in the United States Midwest. Anna Mae Winburn was a student of Waddle's as well.

After leading the Cotton Club Boys and several smaller outfits, Winburn led the International Sweethearts of Rhythm to fame during World War II. The Sweethearts were the first integrated all women's band in the United States. Nat Towles also led an important territory band out of Omaha during the swing era, and most of these bands were represented by the National Orchestra Service, which was also based out of Omaha. It was a nationally regarded company which acted as agent for dozens of bands.

International Jazz legend Preston Love was an important figure in Omaha's African-American community. After playing in Towles' and Hunter's bands, Love joined Count Basie as a saxophonist. After traveling the world, Love came back to North Omaha and founded his own band. He also joined the staff of the Omaha Star newspaper. Love toured the U.S. and Europe into the late 1990s and died in 2004.

North Omaha's musical culture gave rise to several influential African-American musicians. Rhythm & Blues singer Wynonie Harris and influential drummer Buddy Miles, who played with guitarist Jimi Hendrix, were friends while they grew up and played together. They collaborated throughout their lives, and while they were playing with the greatest names in rock and roll, jazz, R&B andfFunk. Big Joe Williams and funk band leader Lester Abrams are also from North Omaha.

=== Historic newspapers ===
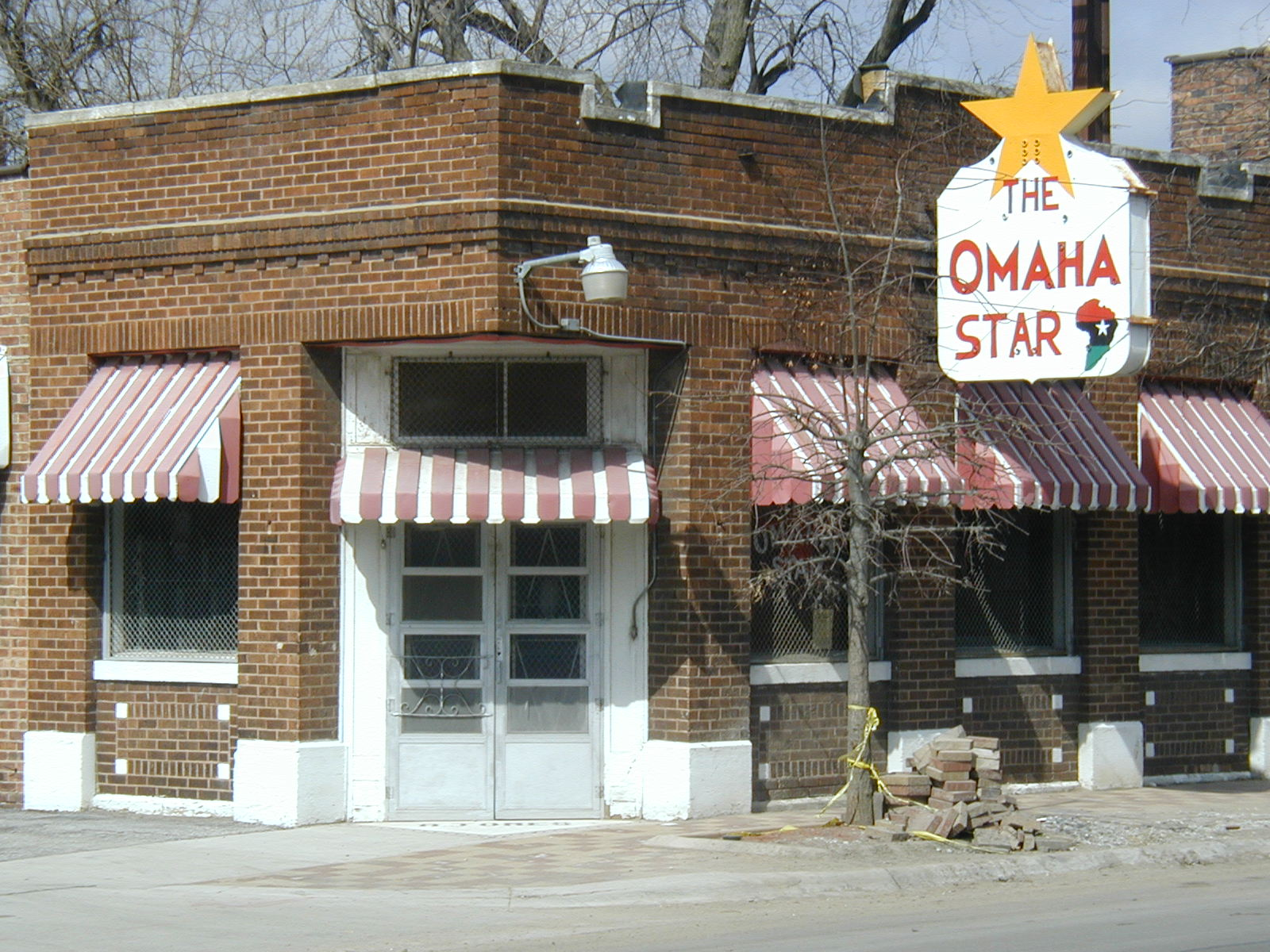
The historic office of the Omaha Star

There have been numerous African-American newspapers in Omaha. The first was the Progress, established in 1889 by Ferdinand L. Barnett. Cyrus D. Bell, an ex-slave, established the Afro-American Sentinel in 1892. In 1893 George F. Franklin started publishing the Enterprise, later published by Thomas P. Mahammitt and edited by his wife, Ella Mahammitt. It was the longest lived of any of the early African-American newspapers published in Omaha. The best known and most widely read of all African-American newspapers in the city was the Omaha Monitor, established in 1915, edited and published by Reverend John Albert Williams. It stopped publishing in 1929.

George Wells Parker, co-founder of the Hamitic League of the World, founded the New Era in Omaha from 1920 through until 1926. The Omaha Guide was established by B.V. and C.C. Galloway in 1927. The Guide, with a circulation of over 25,000 and an advertisers' list including business firms from coast to coast, was the largest African-American newspaper west of the Missouri River through the 1930s.

Today, African-American culture in Omaha is regarded as being anchored, in large part, by The Omaha Star, founded by the late Mildred D. Brown and her husband S. E. Gilbert in 1938. Brown is believed to be the first female, and certainly the first African-American woman, to have founded a newspaper in the nation's history. She managed the paper for the rest of her life. Since 1945 the paper was the only one representing the black community in Omaha and the only black paper being printed in the state. Today the paper has a circulation of more than 30,000, is distributed to the 48 continental states, and is being managed by her niece.

=== Other cultural institutions ===
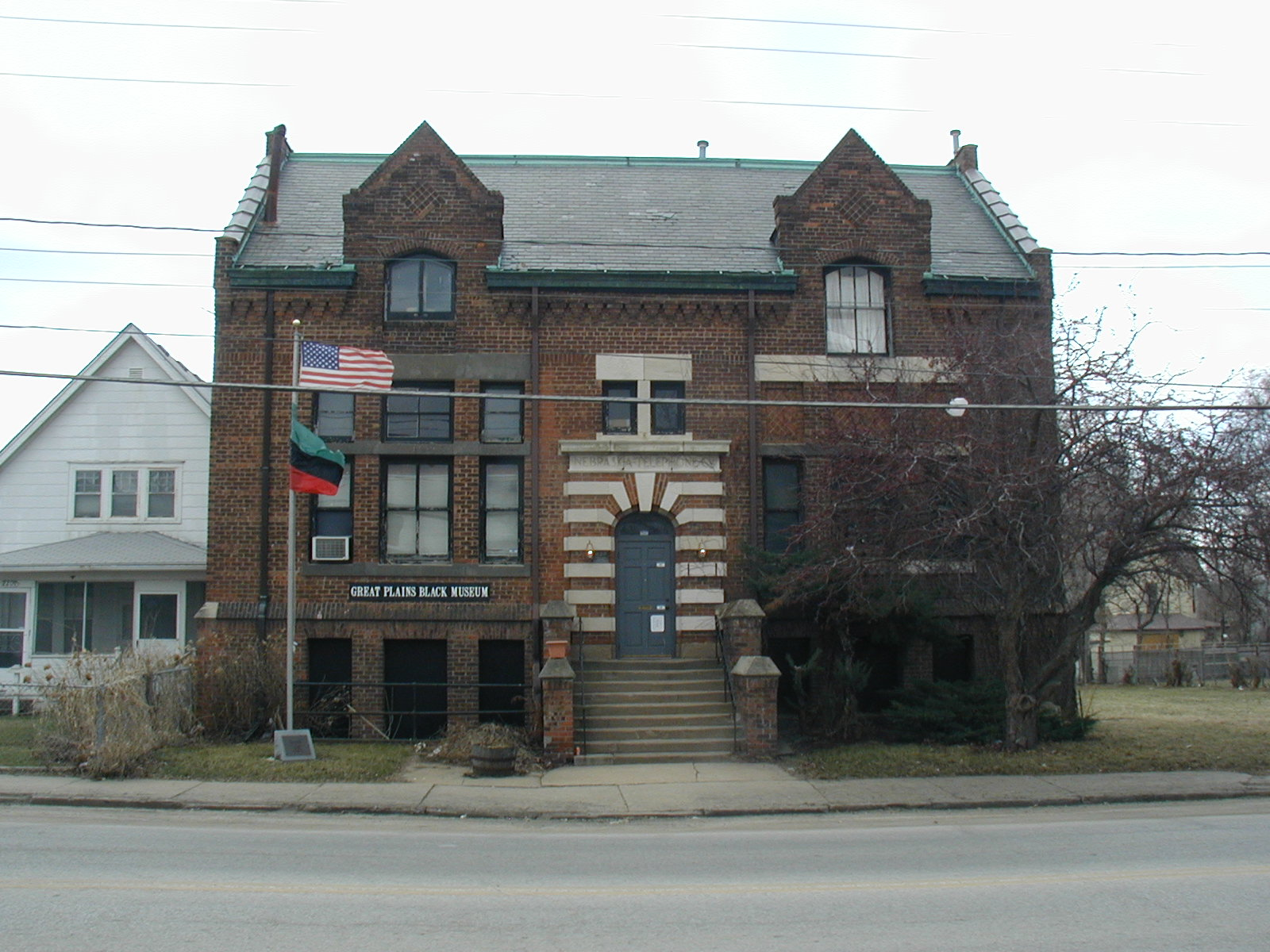

The Fair Deal Cafe, located on North 24th Street, was called the "Black City Hall" during its existence from 1954 to 2003. Today, Omaha's African-American community celebrates its heritage in numerous ways. The biennial Native Omahans Days is a week-long celebration including picnics, family reunions and a large parade. Also held on a biennial calendar is the induction ceremony for the Omaha Black Music Hall of Fame, or OBMHoF. Their inductees include African American contributors to rock and roll, swing, jazz and R&B, as well as other cultural contributions.

Formed by Bertha Calloway in the 1960s, the Negro Historical Society opened the Great Plains Black History Museum in North Omaha in 1974. Located at 2213 Lake Street, the museum is home to Omaha's only African-American history collection. The annual Omaha Jazz and Blues Festival also promotes African-American culture throughout the city.

== Race relations ==
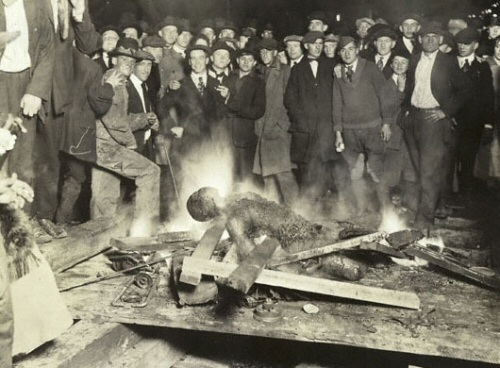
An African American lynched by white mob in Omaha, 1919

North Omaha has a contentious history between whites and African Americans that is predicated on racism. In 1891 an African American George Smith was lynched at the Douglas County Courthouse, accused as a suspect for allegedly attacking a young girl. While little is known about Smith, reports of the incident described a mob dragging Smith from his cell, before any court trial, and hanging him from a nearby street post.

In July 1910 racial tension flared towards the African-American community after a tremendous upset victory by African-American boxer Jack Johnson in Reno, Nevada. Mobs of whites roamed throughout Omaha rioting, as they did in cities across the U.S. The mobs wounded several black men in the city, killing one.

The Red Summer of 1919 caused one Omaha newspaper to run a front page declaration that 21 Omaha women reported that they were assaulted from early June to late September 1919. In an example of yellow journalism, 20 of the victims were white and 16 of the assailants were identified as black, while only one of the victims was black. A separate newspaper warned that vigilante committees would be formed if the "respectable colored population could not purge those from the Negro community who were assaulting white girls." During the ensuing Omaha Race Riot of 1919 in September, a white ethnic mob from South Omaha took over the Douglas County Courthouse. The white rioters lynched Willy Brown, an accused packinghouse worker. They then tried to attack blacks on the street and move against the community in North Omaha. Soldiers from Fort Omaha put down the riot. They reestablished control and were stationed in South Omaha, to prevent any more mobs from forming, and in North Omaha at 24th and Lake streets "to prevent any further murders of black citizens. Orders were issued that any citizen with a gun faced immediate arrest. All blacks were ordered to remain indoors."

=== Segregation ===
A legacy of this terrible summer was the de facto racial segregation of many of Omaha's neighborhoods. Introduced in the 1930s, the practices of redlining by banks and racially restrictive housing covenants effectively ended for decades the ability of African Americans to buy or rent outside North Omaha. Originally built in the 1930s, Omaha housing projects were intended for occupancy without reference to race. A 1937 report from the Omaha Housing Authority reported that residents included "both black and white occupants and there are 284 units. There is no distinct segregation of the whites from the blacks but individual buildings will be confined to either Negro or white." The Logan Fontenelle Housing Project, built during the Depression, with an addition completed in 1941, to improve working class housing in North Omaha, was closed to African Americans through the 1950s. Even in the 1940s, housing was so overcrowded in the area that some families stayed at the projects although their income exceeded the limits, because they couldn't find housing elsewhere. With civil rights challenges, the segregation policy that kept African Americans out of public housing changed in the 1960s.

The massive loss of industrial jobs changed the nature of families and the issues in public housing. Although the Logan Fontenelle projects were first built for working families, they came to be dominated by the unemployed. Other public housing projects also reflected later de facto segregation. A concentration of problems here and in other cities led the City of Omaha, along with the U.S. Department of Housing and Urban Development, to radically rethink public housing in the 1990s. The Logan Fontenelle Housing Project was torn down in 1996. Today public housing is scattered throughout Omaha and often combined with market rate housing and community amenities.

=== Civil Rights Movement ===
The lynching of Willy Brown has been credited for radicalizing Omaha's African-American community. In the 1920s the Omaha chapter of Marcus Garvey's Universal Negro Improvement Association was founded by Earl Little, a Baptist minister and the father of Malcolm X. Malcolm X was born in Omaha in 1925. Malcolm X's mother reported a 1924 incident where her family was warned to leave Omaha by Ku Klux Klansmen. She was told that her husband, Earl Little, was "stirring up trouble" through his involvement with Universal Negro Improvement Association. The family moved shortly thereafter.

Another radical leader, Communist spokesman and one-time leader of American forces in the Spanish Civil War Harry Haywood, was born in 1898 in South Omaha as Haywood Hall to parents who were former slaves. In 1913 his father was beaten by a white gang at the South Omaha meatpacking plant where he worked, forcing the family to move from the city. The African Blood Brotherhood, started in Omaha, contributed to radicalizing Haywood when he joined it the group in Chicago, where his family had moved in 1915.

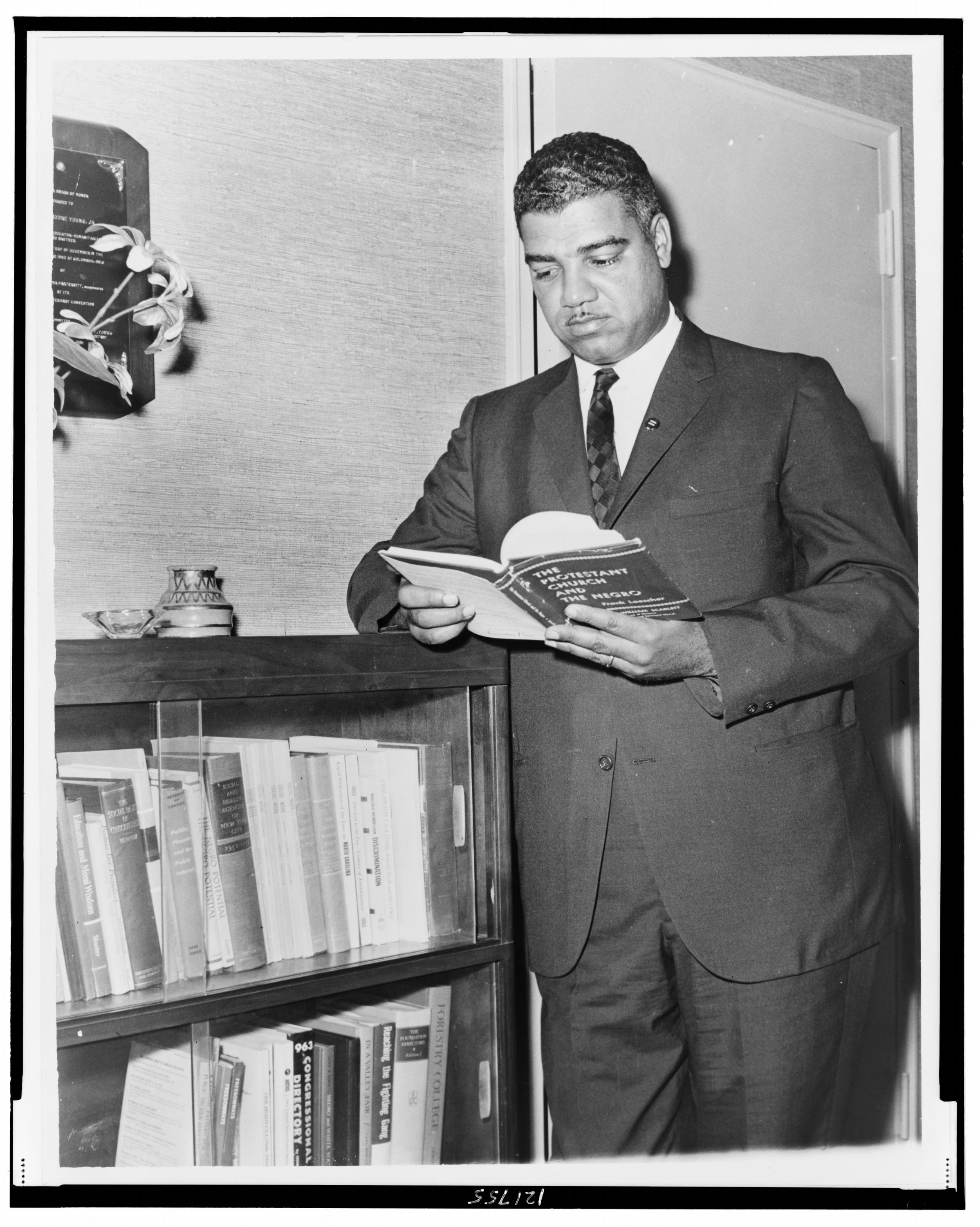
Whitney Young

Starting in 1920, the Colored Commercial Club organized to help blacks in Omaha secure employment and to encourage business enterprises among African Americans. The National Federation of Colored Women had five chapters in Omaha. In 1927 the first Urban League chapter (now the Urban League of Nebraska) in the American West was founded in the city. Whitney Young led the chapter in 1950, tripling its membership. Eventually, he would take over the national leadership of the Urban League in 1961.

The Industrial Workers of the World organized African-American workers in the South Omaha Stockyards in the 1920s. Along with the rest of the working class, they suffered setbacks during layoffs in the Great Depression.

In the 1930s, however, an interracial committee succeeded in organizing the United Meatpacking Workers of America, one of the Congress of Industrial Organizations (CIO) unions. They worked to end segregation of job positions in meatpacking in the 1940s. Community leader Rowena Moore attacked gender restrictions and organized to expand opportunities in industry for black women. UMPWA helped African Americans extend their political power and gain an end to segregation in retail places in the 1950s. After all this progress, however, the loss of more than 10,000 jobs due to structural changes in the railroad and meatpacking industries in the 1960s sharply reduced opportunities for the working-class communities.

In 1952, Arthur B. McCaw became the first African American to be appointed to a cabinet level position in the Nebraska governor's office, budget director of the state of Nebraska in 1952. Prior to that he had been active in Omaha civil rights and was an assessor and on the tax appraisal board of Douglas County. In 1955 he was Nebraska state chairman of the NAACP and helped form a Lincoln chapter of the organization.

As a major western city, Omaha was visited by Martin Luther King Jr. in 1958 and Robert F. Kennedy in 1968, who helped galvanize the civil rights movement in North Omaha. Local leaders continued to struggle against racism. North Omaha was marred by race-related violence and de facto segregation throughout the 20th century. When the Black Panthers were implicated in a police killing in North Omaha in 1970, the trial highlighted political tensions. The Rice–Poindexter case continues to highlight Omaha's contentious legacy of racism. As of 2017, a majority of Omaha's African-American population still lives in North Omaha.

=== Integration ===
Studies have shown starting in the 1950s Omaha's white middle class moved from North Omaha to the suburbs of West Omaha in the phenomenon called "white flight." The inability of government money to solve the problems of Omaha's African American community was accented by white flight. The city's schools were greatly affected by racial unrest. Consequential to the 1971 Swann v. Charlotte-Mecklenburg Board of Education ruling enforcing desegregation busing in the United States, Omaha was reputed to have adapted well to integrated busing. However, an analysis of white flight found that public schools in Omaha had enhanced racial discrimination despite their integration attempts. Optional attendance zones, the location of new schools, and feeder patterns were found to enhance segregation. This study found that mandatory busing was required to attain racial balance in every school. Enrollment of white students in the Omaha Public Schools plummeted in the 1970s, while the enrollment of black students during the same period rose from 21% to 30%, primarily due to the loss of white students. In the 1990s the Omaha Housing Authority adopted a scattered site housing plan, eventually destroying several of the housing projects in the city, including the Logan Fontenelle Housing Project.

=== Race riots ===
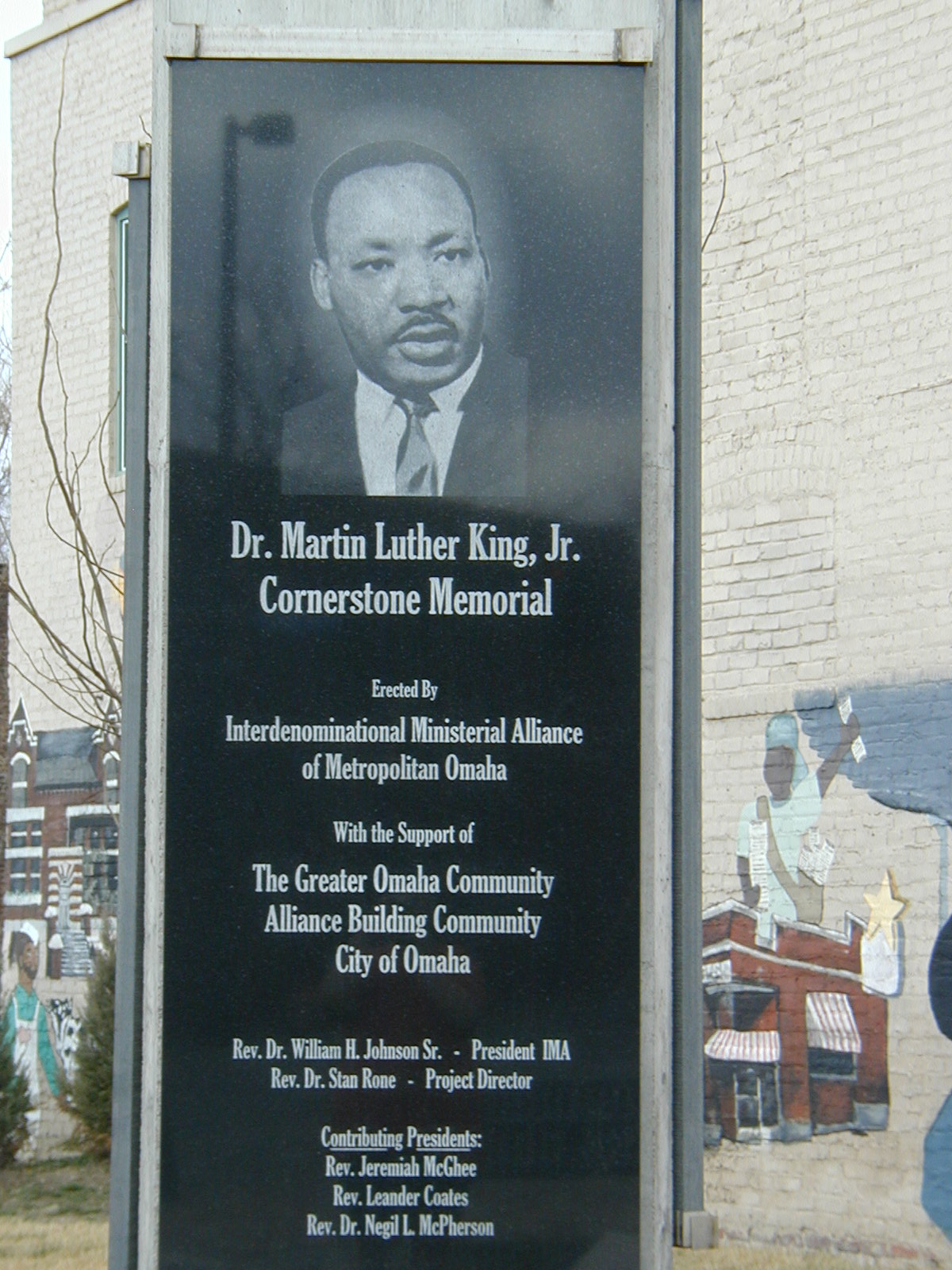
Dr. Martin Luther King Jr. Cornerstone Memorial at the northwest corner of 24th and Lake Street in North Omaha

The civil rights movement brought calls for black power and against racism to Omaha. While youths throughout the city were being drafted to fight in the Vietnam War, funding for education and youth programs were being cut, and policing tactics were targeting African-American youth. This led to a series of protests and riots, the repercussions of which are still felt today in some communities.

On July 4, 1966, the temperature soared to 103 degrees. A crowd of African Americans gathered at the intersection of North 24th and Lake Streets in the evening. When police requested their dispersal they responded violently. After demolishing police cars, the mob roamed the North 24th Street business corridor for hours, throwing firebombs and demolishing storefronts. After three days of rioting, millions of dollars of damage was reported by affected businesses.

Riots erupted again on August 1, 1966, after a 19-year-old was shot by a white, off-duty policeman during a burglary. The Omaha World-Herald and local television stations blamed African Americans for the conditions they faced in their deteriorating neighborhoods during this period. Three buildings were firebombed, and 180 riot police were required to quell the crowds.

On March 4, 1968, a crowd of high school and university students were gathered at the Omaha Civic Auditorium to protest the presidential campaign of George Wallace, the segregationist governor of Alabama. After counter-protesters began acting violently toward the youth activists, police brutality led to the injury of dozens of protesters. An African-American youth was shot and killed by a police officer during the melee, and fleeing students caused thousands of dollars of damage to businesses and cars. The following day a local barber named Ernie Chambers helped calm a disturbance and prevent a riot by students at Horace Mann Junior High School. Chambers was already recognized as a community leader. After finishing his law degree, Chambers was elected to the Nebraska State Legislature, and served a total of 38 years, longer than any of his predecessors.

African-American teenager Vivian Strong was shot and killed by police officers in an incident at the Logan Fontenelle Housing Projects on June 24, 1969. Young African Americans in the area rioted in response to the teenager's death, with looting along the North 24th Street business corridor. During this initial surge, eight businesses were destroyed by firebombing or looting. Rioting went on for several more days. This is the last noted riot in Omaha.

The effects of these riots is still evident in the North 24th Street district, with high numbers of vacant lots and general economic depression still prevalent.

=== Commemorations and recognitions ===
There have been several different organizations formed to commemorate the history of Omaha's African Americans. In the 1960s Bertha Calloway founded the Nebraska Negro Historical Society, and in 1974 the Society opened the Great Plains Black History Museum. The museum remains "dedicated to publicizing and preserving the achievements of the region’s vibrant African American heritage".

In 1976, the community began Native Omaha Days, devised as a series of activities to celebrate black history in the city. In addition to being a labor organizer in meatpacking in the 1940s, Rowena Moore led an effort to recognize the Malcolm X House Site in the 1970s. A monument to Dr. Martin Luther King Jr. was placed along North 24th Street in the late 1990s. The Omaha Black Music Hall of Fame was founded in 2005 to celebrate the city's musical history.

=== Economics ===
The director of a statewide poverty advocacy group was quoted as saying in 2007: "In Omaha, you start talking about low-income issues, people assume you're talking about minority issues..." As of October 2007, the city of Omaha, the 42nd largest in the country, has the fifth highest percentage of low-income African Americans in the country. Census data from 2000 in Douglas County show more than 7,800 families live below the poverty line, about 6.7 percent of families. The percentage of black children in Omaha who live in poverty ranks number one in the United States, with nearly six of 10 black kids living below the poverty line. Only one other metropolitan area in the U.S., Minneapolis, has a wider economic disparity between blacks and whites.

== African Americans from Omaha ==
Being born in Omaha doesn't make me an American any more than being born in an oven makes a cat a biscuit. – Malcolm X

Notable African Americans from Omaha (alphabetical)
Name	Image	Role	Era
Dinah Abrahamson		Author, politician	2010s
Lester Abrams		Funk musician	1970s
John Adams Jr.		Lawyer, state legislator, served in last session of the Nebraska House of Representatives and was only black member of first session of Nebraska unicameral in 1937 where he served until 1941	1932–1940s
John Adams Sr.		Lawyer, minister, presiding elder of AME church, state legislator, only black member of Nebraska unicameral for much of his tenure from 1949 to 1962 (father of John Adams Jr.)	1922–1960s
Houston Alexander		Mixed martial artist, hip hop artist and radio DJ	1980s–present
Comfort Baker		First African American to graduate from Omaha High Schools	1890s
Alfred S. Barnett		Journalist (brother of Ferdinand L. Barnett)	1880s–1890s
Ferdinand L. Barnett		Journalist, founder of The Progress, member of Nebraska State House of Representatives in 1926 (brother of Alfred S. Barnett)	1880s–1931
John Beasley		Television and film actor	1980s–present
Cyrus D. Bell		Politician, journalist, founder of The Afro-American Sentinel	1860s–1910s
Bob Boozer		Former National Basketball Association player, gold medalist at the 1960 Summer Olympics	1950s–1960s
Frank Brown		City of Omaha City councilmember	1970s–present
Mildred Brown		Founder of the Omaha Star newspaper	1930s–1980s
Willy Brown		Local worker lynched by white mob	1919
James Bryant		Journalist	1890s
Herman Cain		Former CEO of Godfather's Pizza (1986–88), Chairman of the Federal Reserve Bank of Kansas City Omaha Branch (1989–91), deputy chairman of the Federal Reserve Bank of Kansas City (1992–94), chairman of the Federal Reserve Bank of Kansas City (1995–96), and among the Republican Party presidential candidates, 2012	1980s–1990s
Bertha Calloway		Founder of the Great Plains Black History Museum	1960s–1990s
Ernie Chambers		Longest-serving Nebraska State Senator in history	1960s–present
Emanuel S. Clenlans		Postal clerk	1870s–1910s
Ophelia Clenlans		Journalist	1890s–1900s
Brenda Council		City of Omaha councilmember, school board member	1970s–present
Alfonza W. Davis		Captain in the Tuskegee Airmen, first black military aviator from Omaha to receive his wings from Tuskegee Field	1940s
Dan Desdunes		Musician, member of Comité des Citoyens involved in Plessy vs Ferguson	1890s–1920s
Rodolphe Desdunes		Poet, historian, member of Comité des Citoyens involved in Plessy vs Ferguson	1870s–1920s
Lucille Skaggs Edwards		Journalist, politician	1900s–1930s
George F. Franklin		Journalist, founder of The Enterprise in Omaha and The Star in Denver	1890s
Lucy Gamble		First African American schoolteacher in Omaha	1890s–1950s
William R. Gamble		Barber (father of Lucy Gamble)	1870s–1890s
Bob Gibson		National Baseball Hall of Fame pitcher for St. Louis Cardinals	1950s–1980s
Ahman Green		Professional football player	1990s – first decade of the 21st century
Wynonie Harris		Rhythm and blues singer	1960s–present
Harry Haywood		High-profile international Communist Party leader	1940s–1970s
Cathy Hughes		Founder and president of Radio One	1970s–present
Lloyd Hunter		Big band leader	1920s–1950s
Kenton Keith		Professional football player	1990s–present
Mondo we Langa (aka David Rice)		Poet, playwright, journalist, convicted murderer	1960s–2010s
John Lewis		Hotel keeper, musician	1870s–1880s
Preston Love		Jazz player	1950s–1990s
Ella Mahammitt		Journalist, founder of the Omaha Colored Woman's Club, co-founder of the National Federation of Afro-American Women	1890s
Sarah Helen Mahammitt		Caterer, writer	1900s–1950s
Thomas P. Mahammitt		Caterer, Boy Scout, journalist, owner of The Enterprise	1890s–1940s
Arthur B. McCaw		Civil servant, NAACP state chairman, first black person to achieve a cabinet level position in the Nebraska governor's office	1940s–1950s
Aaron Manasses McMillan		Doctor, missionary, member of Nebraska legislature 1929–1930	1920s–1960s
Lois "Lady Mac" McMorris		Guitarist	1970s–present
Buddy Miles		Musician	1960s–1990s
Rowena Moore		Labor activist in meatpacking industry; founder of the Malcolm X House Site	1940s for union; 1970s–1980s as civic activist
Sandra Organ		Longtime Houston Ballet soloist	1980s–present
Edwin R. Overall		Abolitionist, mail carrier, and politician	1850s–1890s
Johnny Owen		Member of Nebraska state legislature 1932–1935, nicknamed "Negro Mayor of Omaha"	1930s–1950s
George Wells Parker		Co-founder of the Hamitic League of the World	1910s–1930s
John Grant Pegg		Inspector of Weights and Measures	1900s–1910s
Harrison J. Pinkett		Journalist, lawyer, soldier	1900s–1950s
Ed Poindexter		Community activist, writer, convicted murderer	1960s–present
Dr. Catherine Grace Pope, Ed.D.		First African-American to enter and win a title in the Miss America Pageant	1969
Ron Prince		Head football coach at Kansas State University	1980s–first decade of the 21st century
Billy Rich		Musician, bassist for Taj Mahal	1960s–present
Dr. Matthew Ricketts		First African American elected to the Nebraska State Legislature, in 1892	1880s–1900
Silas Robbins		Lawyer, politician	1880s–1910s
Johnny Rodgers		1972 Heisman Trophy winner, College Football Hall of Fame inductee, voted Nebraska's "player of the century"	1960s–1980
Joe Rogers		Colorado lieutenant governor, 1999–2003 (R)	1990s
Amber Ruffin		Comedian, writer and actress; first black woman to write on a late night network talk show (Late Night with Seth Meyers) in the US	1990s–
Gale Sayers		Professional football player, Pro Football Hall of Fame inductee	1960s
John Andrew Singleton		Dentist, member of Nebraska state legislature 1927–1928, known as "the militant dentist" in Jamaica, New York, after moving there in 1933, important member of the 1941–1947 March on Washington Movement	1920s–1940s
Millard F. Singleton		Civil servant (father of John Andrew Singleton, brother of Walter J. Singleton)	1880s–1910s
Walter J. Singleton		Journalist, clerk (brother of Walter J. Singleton)	1890s–1930s
W. H. C. Stephenson		Doctor, preacher, first African American doctor in Nevada	1860s–1890s
Gabrielle Union		Television and film actress	1990s – first decade of the 21st century
Luigi Waites		Musician	1960s–2010
Victor B. Walker		Soldier, political activist, lawyer, civil rights activist, police officer, saloon owner, journalist, and gangster	1890s–1920s
Clarence W. Wigington		Architect	1910s–1950
Big Joe Williams		Musician	1930s–1970s
John Albert Williams		Preacher, journalist, published The Monitor (husband of Lucy Gamble)	1890s–1930s
Alphonso Wilson		Politician	1890s–1910s
Anna Mae Winburn		Big band leader	1930s–1960
Helen Jones Woods		Big band trombonist	1930s–1960
Malcolm X		Civil rights leader (grew up elsewhere)	1930s–1960s
Whitney Young		Former head of Omaha Urban League (now the Urban League of Nebraska)	1930s–1960s

== See also ==
- History of African Americans in Omaha in the 19th century
- African Americans History of Nebraska
- History of slavery in Nebraska
- History of North Omaha, Nebraska
- Culture in North Omaha, Nebraska
- People from North Omaha, Nebraska
- Music in Omaha
- Ethnic groups in Omaha, Nebraska
- Mexicans in Omaha, Nebraska
- Germans in Omaha, Nebraska
- Danish people in Omaha, Nebraska
- Poles in Omaha, Nebraska
- Irish in Omaha, Nebraska
- Swedes in Omaha, Nebraska
- Czechs in Omaha, Nebraska
- Greeks in Omaha, Nebraska
- History of the Jews in Omaha, Nebraska
