= Salem Baptist Church (Kentucky) =

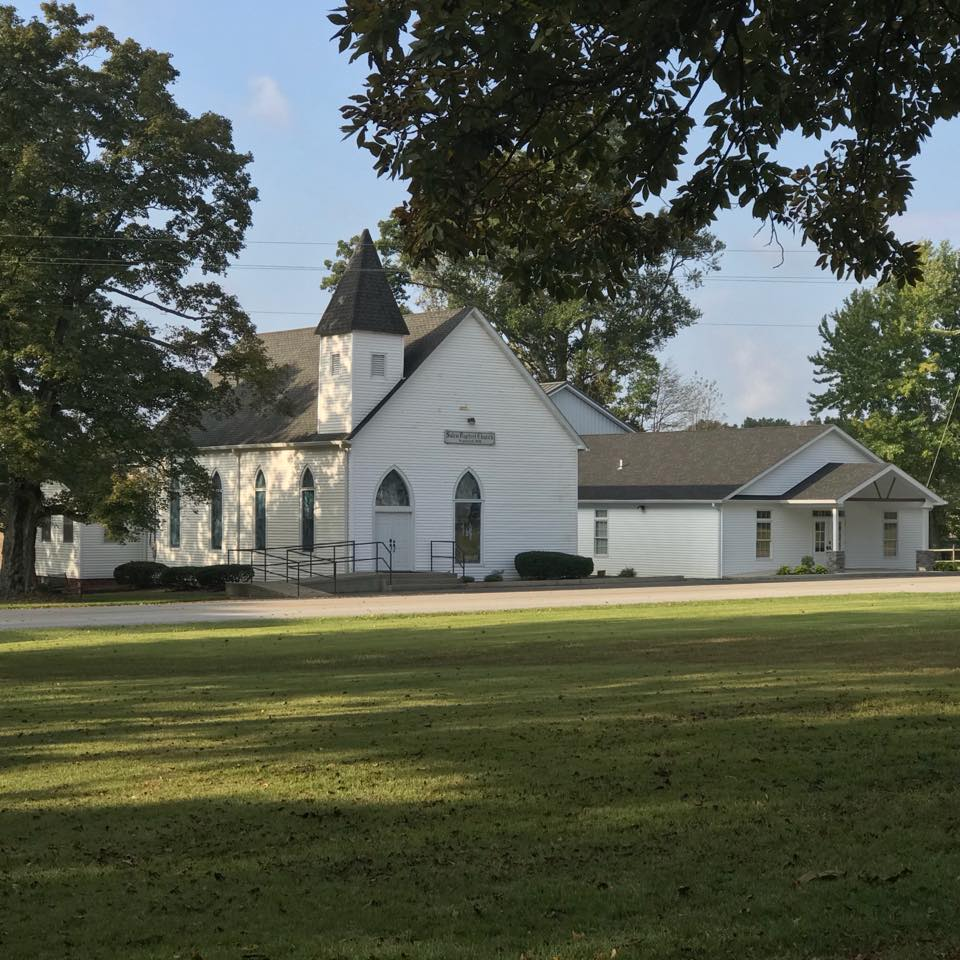

- Location within Kentucky
- 37.2851°N 86.7686°W
- Location: 6407 Logansport Rd., Morgantown, KY 42261
- Country: United States
- Denomination: Southern Baptist
- Website: www.salembchurch.org

History
- Former name(s): The United Baptist Church of Salem, Salem Missionary Baptist Church
- Founded: 1838; 188 years ago
- Founder: Joshua A. Render

Clergy
- Pastor: Pastor Robert Rowland

Salem Baptist Church is a Baptist church located in Logansport, Butler County, Kentucky, and is affiliated with the Southern Baptist Convention. Since 2024, Salem's pastor has been Robert Rowland.

== History ==
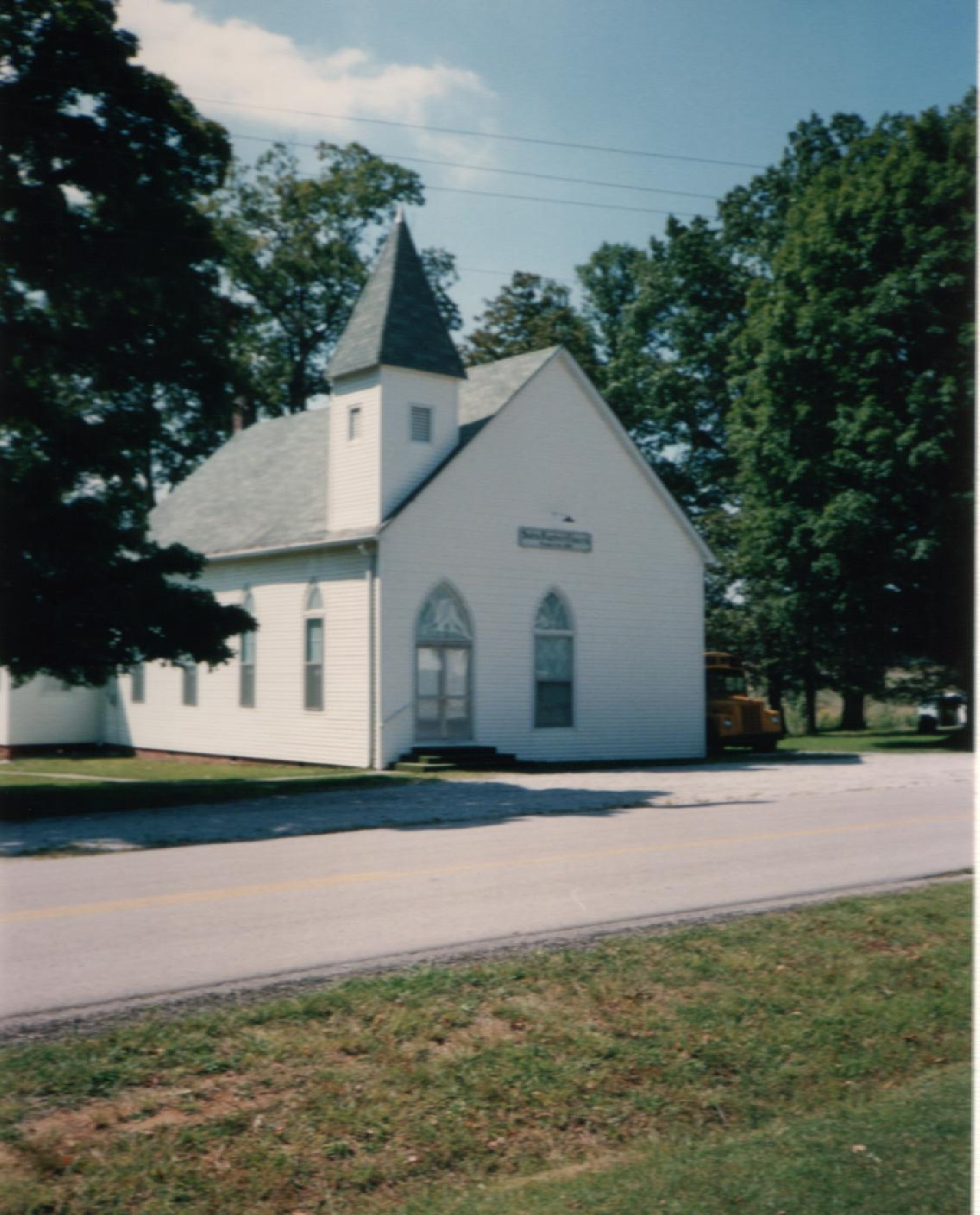
Salem Baptist Church Logansport KY c. 1986-1988

The founding of Salem Baptist Church was a result of the Second Great Awakening. Between 1830 and 1910 the number of Baptist churches in Kentucky tripled, from 574 to 1,774 and church membership increased five-fold from 39,975 to 224,237. In 1838 the Beaver Dam Baptist Church in Ohio County, Kentucky granted part of its congregation leave to constitute an independent body, known as Salem, in the Big Bend of the Green River. Although isolated— separated by seven miles of treacherous roads northwest of the county seat of Morgantown, which itself contained fewer than 500 citizens in 1850—the Big Bend was the site of a busy wharf (Borah's Landing) and boasted several ferries. The people had easy contact with the outside world via steamboats on the Green River.

Salem's congregants first met in a log house, but in 1849 they constructed a more commodious structure which accommodated their meetings and a school. The school building is now used for church and community functions, including the Big Bend Rural Development Club. In 1857, the congregation began construction on a new building that was to be used strictly as a church facility. It was completed in 1860. The congregation met on October 1, 1856, and resolved to constitute a Sunday School by electing pro tem officers who would conduct a meeting later in the month to officially organize the school.

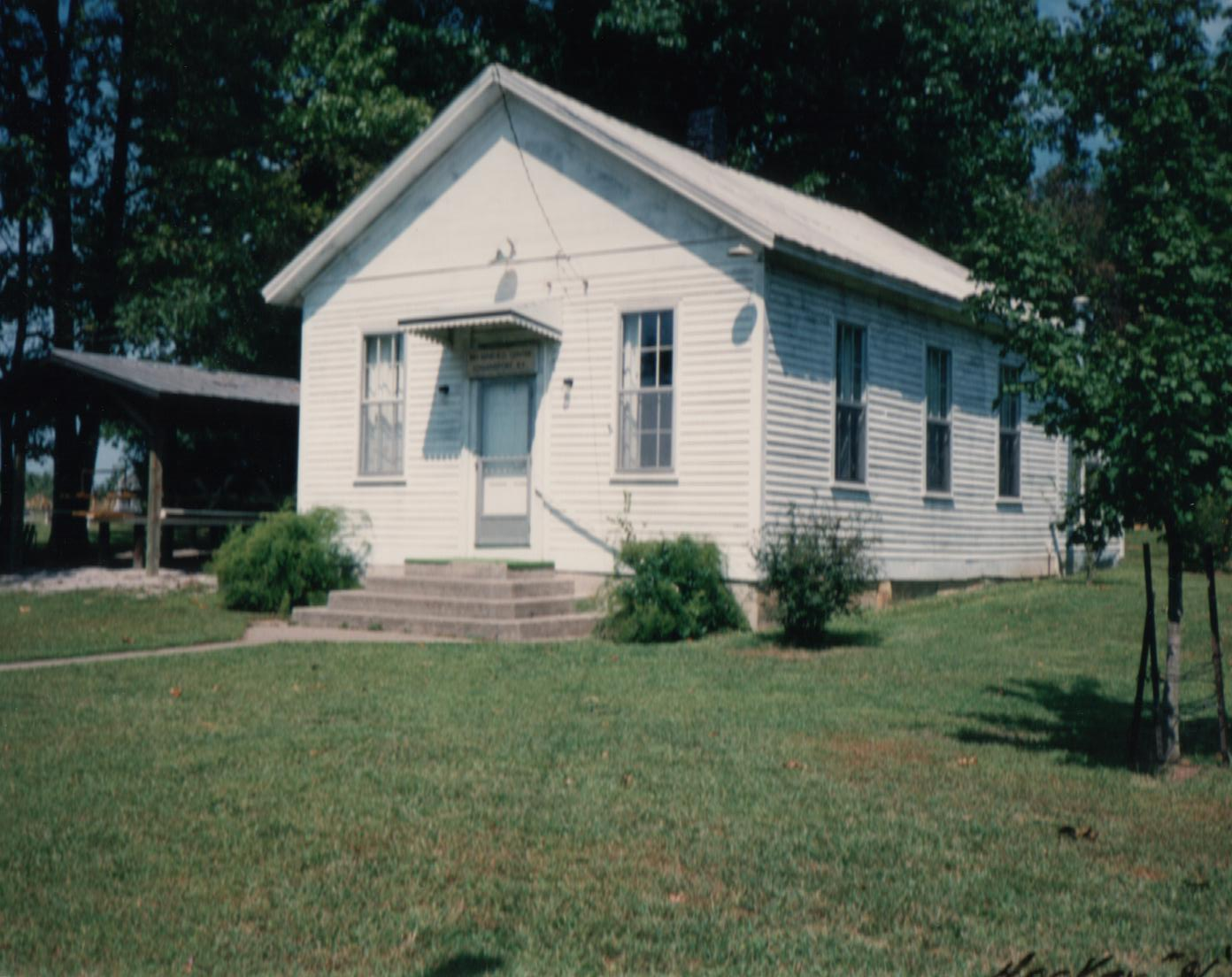
Salem Schoolhouse c. 1986–1988

On January 4, 1905, the church purchased the three fourths of an acre from R.L. Render on the south side of the road, where the current church building now stands. It was dedicated in 1915. Minutes include an offer from Monticello Baptist Church in Provo, Kentucky for the use of their church during the construction of Salem. Over the years, new classrooms, a basement, and many other improvements have been made.

100 years later the church broke ground on a new space for ministry. This additional space was completed in the summer of 2016. This new building is adjacent to the sanctuary. Its use is for fellowship meals, bible school, children and adult Sunday School classes, weddings, community use, and youth gatherings.

== Partnerships and associations ==
Salem Baptist Church freely affiliates and partners with the Southern Baptist Convention, the Kentucky Baptist Convention, the Gasper River Association of Baptists, and other local churches, ministries, and organizations. We support ministries and missionaries through the Southern Baptist Convention.

== Pastors ==
=== Pastors by year ===
Year	Pastor	Notes
1838	Joshua Render	The church met in homes for a while, until the Salem school was built. The United Baptist Church of Jesus Christ as Salem joined the Gasper River Association in 1839.
1839	Joshua Render	
1840	Joshua Render	
1841	Joshua Render	
1842	Joshua Render	
1843	No pastor.	
1844	William Childers	
1845	James F. Austin	The church was meeting in a small, old log house.
1846	James F. Austin	
1847	James F. Austin	
1848	James F. Austin	
1849	James F. Austin	
1850	James F. Austin	
1851	James F. Austin	
1852	James F. Austin	
1853	James F. Austin	
1854	Alfred Taylor	
1855	No pastor.	
1856	No pastor.	
1857	James S. Coleman	
1858	J.M. Peay	
1859	Alfred Taylor	
1860	Alfred Taylor	
1861	Alfred Taylor	
1862	Alfred Taylor	
1863	Alfred Taylor	
1864	James F. Austin	
1865	James F. Austin	
1866	J.F. James	
1867	J.F. James	
1868	James S. Taylor	
1869	B.T. Mayhugh	
1870	B.T. Mayhugh	
1871	B.T. Mayhugh	
1872	B.T. Mayhugh	
1873	B.T. Mayhugh	
1874	R. Jenkins	
1875	R. Jenkins	
1876	B.T. Mayhugh	
1877	B.T. Mayhugh	
1878	B.T. Mayhugh	
1879	B.T. Mayhugh	
1880	J.P. Taylor	
1881	J.P. Taylor	
1882	B.T. Mayhugh	
1883	B.T. Mayhugh	
1884	B.T. Mayhugh	
1885	B.W. Neal	
1886	B.T. Mayhugh	
1887	B.T. Mayhugh	
1888	G.W. Pendley	
1889	J.N. Jarnigan	
1890	J.N. Jarnigan	
1891	J.N. Jarnigan	
1892	J.N. Jarnigan	
1893	J.N. Jarnigan	
1894	J.N. Jarnigan	
1895	M.M. Hampton	
1896	J.B. Rogers	
1897	J.N. Jarnigan	
1898	J.N. Jarnigan	
1899	J.N. Jarnigan	
1900	E.D. Maddox	
1901	A.B. Gardner	
1902	A.B. Gardner	
1903	A.B. Gardner	
1904	A.B. Gardner	
1905	A.B. Gardner	
1906	A.B. Gardner	
1907	J.E. Bruce	
1908	J.E. Bruce	
1909	A.B. Gardner	
1910	A.B. Gardner	
1911	J.W. Wade	
1912	J.W. Wade	
1913	J.W. Wade	
1914	T.T. Moore	Moore pastored 5 churches in 1914. Salem's WMU organized in 1914.
1915	T.T. Moore	
1916	T.T. Moore	
1917	T.T. Moore	
1918	A.B. Gardner	
1919	R.B. Neel	
1920	L.B. Whitaker	
1921	Whitaker/Browning	
1922	S.P. Browning	
1923	S.P. Browning	
1924	Jesse B. Hill	
1925	Jesse B. Hill	
1926	Z. Ferrel	
1927	Z. Ferrel	
1928	W.W. Payne	
1929	T.T. Moore	
1930	T.T. Moore	
1931	T.T. Moore	
1932	John W.T. Givens	
1933	John W.T. Givens	
1934	John W.T. Givens	
1935	John W.T. Givens	
1936	John W.T. Givens	
1937	John W.T. Givens	
1938	John W.T. Givens	
1939	T.G. Shelton	
1940	T.G. Shelton	
1941	T.G. Shelton	
1942	C.L. Hardcastle	
1943	C.L. Hardcastle	
1944	C.L. Hardcastle	
1945	C.L. Hardcastle	
1946	Thomas Pope	
1947	Fred Wood	
1948	Fred Wood	
1949	Albert Bolling/Glen Britt	
1950	William H. Rogers	
1951	William H. Rogers	
1952	No pastor.	
1953	Thomas E. Lawhorn	
1954	R.B. Hooks	
1955	R.B. Hooks	
1956	Richard Stiltner	
1957	Richard Stiltner	
1958	Richard Stiltner	
1959	Ralph Romans	
1960	Ralph Romans	
1961	Ralph Romans	
1962	Ralph Romans	
1963	Ralph Romans	
1964	Romans/Hederick	
1965	John C. Hederick	
1966	John C. Hederick	
1967	John C. Hederick	
1968	Hederick/Cardwell	Hederick to February, Cardwell from November
1969	James Cardwell	
1970	James Cardwell	
1971	James Cardwell	
1972	James Cardwell	
1973	James Cardwell	
1974	James Cardwell	
1975	James Cardwell	
1976	James Cardwell	
1977	Danny Saunders	
1978	Danny Saunders	
1979	Kenneth Harris	
1980	Kenneth Harris	
1981	Kenneth Harris	
1982	David Coleman	
1983	David Coleman	
1984	David Coleman	
1985	Coleman/Phelps	Coleman to May, Phelps from September
1986	Charles (Pete) Phelps	
1987	Phelps/Smith	Phelps to May, Smith from October
1988	Bruce Smith	
1989	Bruce Smith	
1990	Bruce Smith	
1991	Bruce Smith	
1992	Bruce Smith	
1993	Bruce Smith	
1994	Murl Gray	
1995	Murl Gray	
1996	Murl Gray	
1997	Murl Gray	
1998	Murl Gray	
1999	Jim Gifford	
2000	Jim Gifford	
2001	Jim Gifford	
2002	Jim Gifford	
2003	Jim Gifford	
2004	Jim Gifford	
2005	Jim Gifford	
2006	Darrell Dockery	
2007	Darrell Dockery	
2008	Darrell Dockery	
2009	Darrell Dockery	
2010	Darrell Dockery	
2011	Derek A. Cain	Pastor Derek Cain became the pastor on October 9, 2011.
2012	Derek A. Cain	
2013	Derek A. Cain	
2014	Derek A. Cain	
2015	Derek A. Cain	
2016	Derek A. Cain	
2017	Derek A. Cain	
2018	Derek A. Cain	
2019	Derek A. Cain	

=== Biographies of pastors ===
==== Joshua Render ====
Joshua Render was a brother to George Render who was an early member of Beaver Dam church. George was ordained to the ministry in 1813. George was highly esteemed for consistent piety, rather than for any superior ability. Joshua was also a longtime member of Beaver Dam church. He was like his brothers, a very moderate preacher. He represented Beaver Dam church in the Association for 15 years. He was pastor of Salem from its constitution, in 1838, until 1842. The time of his death has not been ascertained.

==== Alfred Taylor ====
Alfred Taylor often preached in private houses in the community before the constitution of the church. He first became pastor of the church in 1854 and returned in 1859 and served until 1863. Previously he was pastor of the Sandy Creek Baptist Church and served there 2 years.

==== Rev. William H. (Bill) Rogers ====
Rogers was married to Martha Louise McPherson on January 15, 1944, and in September 1944 enlisted in the US Army, reaching the rank of 1st Lieutenant and serving with the Occupation forces in Japan. After working in home construction for several years, he was ordained as a Baptist minister in 1949 and resumed his college education. While studying at Western Kentucky College, he was pastor at Salem Baptist Church in Logansport KY, then in 1954 moved to Eastwood Baptist Church in Bowling Green KY as its founding pastor. In 1961 he became pastor at Melbourne Heights Baptist Church in Louisville KY and completed his studies at the Southern Baptist Theological Seminary in May 1964. He joined the Kentucky Baptist Convention staff in 1971 and served as Director of Interracial Relations, Director of the Minister/Church Support Division, and post-retirement as Pastoral Consultant on the Leadership Development Team. He also served as an interim pastor for many churches and on the staff at Cedar Creek Baptist Church. Rogers, 95 died peacefully on Tuesday, December 25, 2018. He lived a long, full life as a father, pastor, mentor and friend to many.

==== Rev. Derek A. Cain ====
Rev. Derek A. Cain is the current pastor of Salem. He became the pastor at Salem on October 9, 2011. Cain is from Pulaski County, Kentucky. He graduated from Berea College in 2005 with a B.A. in Education. He attained his M.Div. from the Baptist Seminary of Kentucky in Georgetown, KY in 2015. He was ordained to the work of the gospel by the authority and order of the Berea Baptist Church, Berea, KY on July 15, 2012. Along with pastoring Salem Baptist Church, Cain began working as the Chaplain and Director of Spirituality at Morgantown Care and Rehabilitation Center in Morgantown, KY in January 2014- July 2023.

== Other data ==
Clerks, Association Messengers, and Other Data, 1838-1988
Year	Clerks	Association Messengers	Attending	Total Members	Sunday School Enrollment	Superintendent
1839	G.M. Borah	G.M. Borah, Theophilus Petty		24		
1840	G.M. Borah, L. Borah, C.J. Render	Lee Borah, Theophilus Petty		23		
1841	G.M. Borah, L. Borah, C.J. Render	Theophilus Petty, V. Borah		19		
1842	G.M. Borah, L. Borah, C.J. Render	Theophilus Petty		26		
1843	G.M. Borah, L. Borah, C.J. Render	Theophilus Petty, V. Borah, L. Borah		24		
1844	G.M. Borah, L. Borah, C.J. Render	Theophilus Petty		25		
1845	G.M. Borah, L. Borah, C.J. Render	Theophilus Petty, G.M. Borah, Noah Borah		24		
1846	G.M. Borah, L. Borah, C.J. Render	Theophilius Petty, G.M. Borah		20		
1847	G.M. Borah, L. Borah, C.J. Render	B. Clark, Theophilius Petty, J.F. Austin		35		
1848	G.M. Borah, L. Borah, C.J. Render	No messengers.		44		
1849	G.M. Borah, L. Borah, C.J. Render	B. Clark, L. Borah, J.F. Austin		43		
1850	G.M. Borah, L. Borah, C.J. Render	J.F. Austin, J. Borah, B. Clark		44		
1851	G.M. Borah, L. Borah, C.J. Render	J.F. Austin, B. Clark		40		
1852	G.M. Borah, L. Borah, C.J. Render	J.F. Austin, B. Clark, G.M. Borah		39		
1853	G.M. Borah, L. Borah, C.J. Render	J.F. Austin, Bl. Clark, N. Borah		64		
1854	G.M. Borah, L. Borah, C.J. Render	J.F. Austin, T.M. James, J.M. Rogers		64		
1855	G.M. Borah, L. Borah, C.J. Render	J.F. Austin, J.M. Hampton		64		
1856	G.M. Borah, L. Borah, C.J. Render	J.F. Austin, T.M. James, J.M. Hampton		61		
1857	G.M. Borah, L. Borah, C.J. Render	J.F. Austin, T.M. James, J.M. Hampton		59		
1858	T.M. James	J.F. Austin, T.M. James, W. Wade		54		

== See also ==
- Southern Baptist Convention conservative resurgence
