= Bertha Calloway =

American activist and historian (1925–2017)

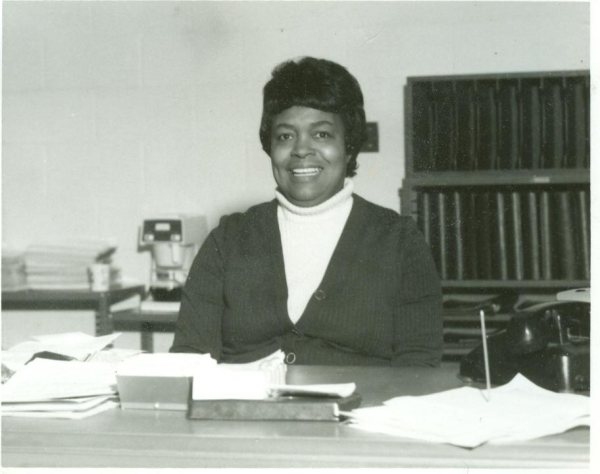
- Born: July 14, 1925
- Died: November 25, 2017 (aged 92)
- Occupations: Museum director, historian
- Known for: Museum founder

Bertha W. Calloway (July 14, 1925 – November 25, 2017) was an African-American community activist and historian in North Omaha, Nebraska. The founder of the Negro History Society and the Great Plains Black History Museum, Calloway won awards from several organizations for her activism in the community and Nebraska. "I Love Black History" was the former website for the Bertha W. Calloway Center for the Research and Study of African and African-American History, Art, and Culture and the Great Plains Black History Museum before it.

== Early life ==
Bertha Calloway was born on July 14, 1925. As a student, she was a member of a pioneering Omaha civil rights group called the DePorres Club, first based at Creighton University. During those years, she was already planning to create a museum about the African-American experience to tell the history she never learned in school. She was also active for years with the National Association for the Advancement of Colored People (NAACP), which had a chapter in the city since 1912.

== Great Plains Black History Museum ==
Working with local supporters, in 1962 Calloway created the Negro History Society. She started collecting artifacts, stories, papers and art of African-American history and culture. She wanted to be able to tell her community the history not yet told in schools. In 1975 Calloway and her husband bought the Webster Telephone Exchange Building to establish the Great Plains Black History Museum. They were helped to open in 1976 by a $101,000 grant from the US Bicentennial Commission. Through the years they also received funding from the city. Throughout the rest of her life Calloway taught Nebraskans at the museum about the contributions of African Americans throughout the Midwest. One of the largest museums devoted to African-American history west of the Mississippi River, the institution has a collection of more than 100,000 items, including paintings, rare books, photographs, and films. In a 1996 interview, Calloway explained, "People must see black history in order for the images they have of black people to change. That's what our museum is all about... revealing a history that's been withheld."

=== Camp Nizhoni ===
In 1978, Bertha and her husband James bought Camp Nizhoni in Lincoln Hills, Colorado. Earlier in the 20th century, it had been the only camp for African-American girls west of Mississippi. Bertha had gone there herself as a girl. Lincoln Hills was a successful resort community near Denver developed by and for African Americans in years when segregation prevented their going to some areas. With the many options open to younger people after the civil rights movement, Lincoln Hills had lost some of its attraction. Because of its historic importance, Calloway nominated the Winks Lodge (named after the founder) to the National Register of Historic Places, where it was listed in 1980. She and her husband sold the camp in 1985. Other parties are trying to redevelop the community.

== Honors ==
In 1999, the Nebraska State Historical Society honored Calloway with the Addison E. Sheldon Memorial Award, for her "outstanding contributions to the preservation and interpretation of Nebraska history", years of service to the NAACP, the Great Plains Black History Museum in Omaha, and her contributions to the understanding of African-American culture in Nebraska.

In November 2016, a part of Lake Street in North Omaha was renamed Bertha Calloway Street.

== Death ==
Calloway died on November 25, 2017, at the age of 92.

== Books by Calloway ==
- (1978) A Pictorial Of The Black Cowboy, with W. V. Hunter and S. Hunter. The Great Plains Black History Museum.
- (1998) Visions of Freedom on the Great Plains: An Illustrated History of African Americans in Nebraska, with A. N. Smith. Donaway Company Publishers.

== See also ==
- History of North Omaha, Nebraska
