= Jack Broomfield =

American community leader (1865–1927)

Jack Broomfield (1865–1927) was an American business leader and noted criminal in Omaha, Nebraska in the late 19th and early 20th century. He was an acknowledged political, social and economic leader in the city's African-American community.

== Career ==
Jack Broomfield began his working life as a Pullman porter, until he lost a leg in a train accident. Moving to Omaha from Red Oak, Iowa in the mid-1880s, he was reputed to be an aspiring criminal boss in the city's Black community. Currying favor with Tom Dennison, Omaha's political boss, Broomfield raised in the ranks. When the city's previous African American criminal boss Vic Walker who ran it got on Dennison's bad side around 1890, Dennison gave Broomfield and his partner Billy Crutchfield control of a saloon called the Midway. Along with its bar, the business had a dance floor, gambling hall, opium den and brothel. The hangout for men was at 1124 Capitol Avenue near the seedy Sporting District. Elizabeth Cady Stanton called the Midway the "most notorious dive in Omaha".

In his new role, Broomfield became a low-scale business leader in Omaha. Accumulating wealth and power, Broomfield became more controlling both within the city's African American community and beyond. After Dr. Matthew Ricketts left Omaha in 1903, Jack Broomfield stepped into the position of the political leader of Omaha's African-American community.

Critics complained that Broomfield was more interested in promoting his illicit interests with the political boss Tom Dennison than promoting the interests of his race. Broomfield had allowed blacks to lose political influence throughout the city, and particularly fell through on keeping the community safe. It was under his leadership that the lynching of Will Brown occurred, but it is difficult to say whether any African-American leader could have prevented such a mob outbreak. He was unable to prevent subsequent redlining of the Near North Side and other forms of segregation throughout the city.

However, his role within the African American community of Omaha positioned Broomfield as a philanthropist and economic magnate. As a private funder of Black-owned businesses, he supported several families becoming successful. He owned several enterprises, including a real estate company that was invested in dozens of properties around the city and beyond. He also contracted local African-American architect Clarence W. Wigington to build the Broomfield Rowhouse in 1913. Giving money to Black charities, Broomfield was repeatedly noted for supporting the segregated senior retirement facility for Black people in North Omaha, as well as the community-oriented activities of Rev. John Albert Williams of St. Phillip Episcopal Church, the editor of The Monitor newspaper.

== Family ==
From 1882 to 1908, Broomfield was married. Around 1900, he adopted a son with his wife. Continuing to raise the child after he was divorced, his son Leroy Broomfield (1902–1971) became an aspiring businessman in North Omaha, operating a dance hall owned by his father and starting a real estate company that eventually merged with his father's business.

The younger Broomfield was a dancer, and when his father died in 1927 Leroy inherited a small fortune. He went to Los Angeles to become a dancer, eventually appearing on stage and in films across the United States and elsewhere. Later in his career, he became a producer, choreographer, and dance teacher.

When Jack died, his funeral was facilitated by Rev. Williams and held at St. Phillip. He was buried in the Forest Lawn Memorial Park in Omaha.

== See also ==
- Harry Buford
- List of people from North Omaha, Nebraska
- Crime in Omaha
