= Alfonza W. Davis =

American World War II pilot

Captain (United States) Alfonza W. Davis
- Alfonza W. Davis
- Born: August 20, 1919; Pensacola, Florida
- Died: October 29, 1944 (aged 24); Adriatic Sea (presumed)
- Military career
- Allegiance: United States of America
- Branch: United States Army Air Corps
- Service years: 1941 – 1944
- Rank: Captain
- Service number: O-798944
- Unit: Tuskegee Airmen
- Commands: Squadron commander, 99th Pursuit Squadron
- Awards: Distinguished Flying Cross; Purple Heart; Air Medal; Distinguished Unit Citation; French Croix de Guerre 1939–1945 with Palm; Congressional Gold Medal awarded to the Tuskegee Airmen

Alfonza W. Davis (August 20, 1919 – October 29, 1944) (MIA) (WIA) was the first African-American aviator from North Omaha, Nebraska, to be awarded his "wings." He was a member of the Tuskegee Airmen, a recipient of the Purple Heart, Distinguished Flying Cross and the Distinguished Unit Citation. Davis was assumed to be dead after going missing on or about October 29, 1944, on a mission over the Adriatic Sea off the coast of Italy.

== Early life ==
Davis was born in Pensacola, Florida, on August 20, 1919, and after his mother died in 1920, he moved with his father and brother to North Omaha, Nebraska. Davis graduated valedictorian from Omaha's Technical High School in 1937 and went on to attend Creighton University, earning a Bachelor of Science in Commerce degree in 1941. At Creighton, he was a member of the Chamber of Commerce. He was also a member of Alpha Phi Alpha fraternity.

== Career ==
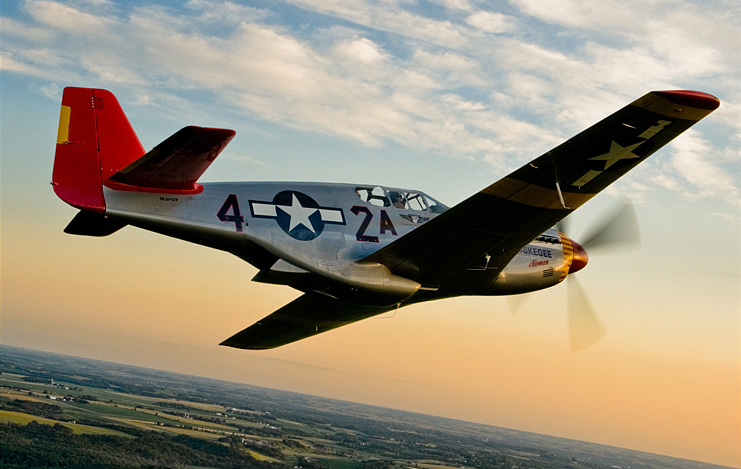
P-51 warbird with red markings. (Note: The Tuskegee Airmen became known for flying their P-51 aircraft with distinctive markings that included red bands on the nose and propeller spinners, yellow wing bands and all-red tail surfaces.)

Davis joined the United States Army on March 17, 1941. He later volunteered for the Army Air Corps in July 1942, and was appointed an aviation cadet. He received his flight training at Tuskegee Army Airfield, Alabama, becoming the first African American from Omaha to graduate and earn his wings. Davis graduated in Class SE-43-C on March 25, 1943, and was assigned to the 302nd Fighter Squadron, 332d Fighter Group. He was later the 332nd’s Assistant Group Operations Officer. The 332d was an all African American unit, known as the "Red Tails" because of their group’s distinctive identification colors. He achieved the rank of captain, flying the P-39, P-47 and P-51 Mustang escort fighters.

Davis’ last assignment was the squadron commander of the 99th Pursuit Squadron. During the war, the 99th destroyed 83 German aircraft. While on a reconnaissance mission to Munich, Germany, on October 29, 1944, flying P-51D-10-NA #44-14465, Davis was last sighted at 1245 hours over the northern Adriatic Sea in overcast weather conditions at approximately 45°22'59"N 13°9'59"E; he never returned to base. A Missing Air Crew Report (#9586) was produced, and the War Department later issued a presumptive finding of death while missing in action on October 30, 1945. Davis is memorialized on the Tablets of the Missing at the Sicily-Rome American Cemetery.

Davis' awards and decorations included a Purple Heart, the Distinguished Flying Cross, an Air Medal with two oak leaf clusters, a Distinguished Unit Citation, and the French Croix de Guerre 1939–1945 with Palm. He was credited with one aerial victory in the Mediterranean Theater of Operations on July 16, 1944. The Tuskegee Airmen were later awarded the Congressional Gold Medal in 2006.

== See also ==
- Dogfights (TV series)
- Executive Order 9981
- List of Tuskegee Airmen
- Military history of African Americans
- The Tuskegee Airmen (movie)

== Legacy ==
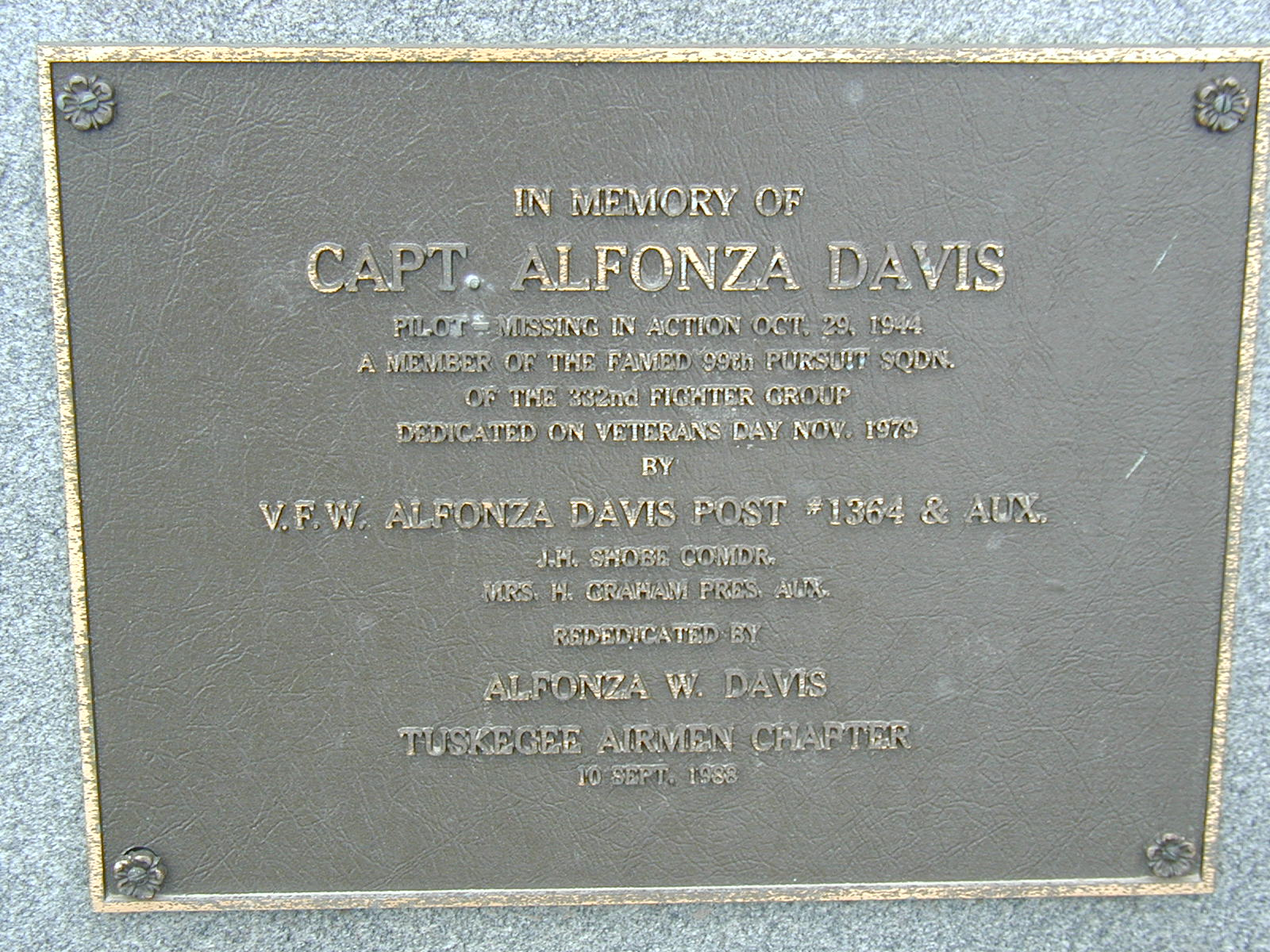
Flagpole plaque for Alfonza Davis outside of the Great Plains Black History Museum.

The Alfonza W. Davis Chapter of Tuskegee Airmen was founded in Omaha in 1988 to conduct historical research and document the "pioneering men and women in military aviation, who served our country, fighting two wars—one against enemy military forces and the other against racism at home and abroad." In 2013, Omaha Public Schools named their newest middle school, located at 8050 North 129th Avenue (near 132nd and State Streets), after him.

== See also ==
- History of North Omaha, Nebraska
- List of people who disappeared mysteriously at sea
- People from North Omaha, Nebraska
