= Lois Mark Stalvey =

American writer and author (1925–2004)

- Born: August 22, 1925; Milwaukee, Wisconsin, U.S.
- Died: December 7, 2004 (aged 79); Sedona, Arizona, U.S.
- Occupation: Author
- Spouse: Bennett Stalvey Jr.
- Children: Bennett III (Spike), Noah, Sarah
- Writing career
- Genre: Autobiographical
- Subject: Racism

Lois Mark Stalvey (August 22, 1925 – December 7, 2004) was an American author, educator and civil rights activist. She was born in Milwaukee, Wisconsin and died in Sedona, Arizona. A 1974 Time magazine feature on her writing reported that Stalvey wrote, "a remarkable chronicle of a white family's confrontation with inner-city schools and a harsh indictment of an educational system that is a disaster for most of its pupils."

== Early life and education ==
Stalvey was born on August 22, 1925, in Milwaukee, Wisconsin. Immediately after graduating from high school in the late 1940s Stalvey started her first writing job as a copy writer for the local Gimbels department store in Milwaukee. One year later, she married, and a year after that, she divorced. In the early 1950s she moved to Chicago and started an ad firm called Lois Mark & Associates. In 1955 she married advertising director Bennett Stalvey Jr. and sold her firm to become a homemaker.

== Career ==
In the late 1950s the couple moved to Omaha, Nebraska, where Lois Stalvey joined in a fight for an African-American surgeon's family to move into their segregated neighborhood in West Omaha, resulting in her husband being transferred to Philadelphia, Pennsylvania in 1961.

In 1965 Stalvey formed the Panel of Philadelphians, which sent teams of four women, including a Catholic, a Jew, an African American, and a WASP, to talk with groups around the city about racial justice. The teams facilitated 110 programs in 1965.

Stalvey's first book, The Education of a WASP, was published in 1970. In it she detailed her experience as a Caucasian learning about civil rights as a mother in Omaha in the 1960s.

In 1976 Stalvey divorced her husband and moved to West Philadelphia. There she began teaching writing and journalism at the Community College of Philadelphia, and wrote articles for The Philadelphia Inquirer and other newspapers.

Stalvey moved to Sedona, Arizona in 1979 to continue writing. Education of an Ordinary Woman, published in 1982, along with Three to Get Ready: The Education of a White Family in Inner City Schools, published in 1997, focused on her experiences after moving to the integrated West Mount Airy neighborhood of Philadelphia. Stalvey wrote a bimonthly book review column for the Sedona Red Rock News from 1984 to 2004.

== Death ==
Stalvey died in Sedona of emphysema on December 7, 2004.

== Legacy ==
Stalvey is cited extensively in publications addressing racism, multiculturalism, white privilege, white allies and other race-related and education-related pieces. She is also regularly cited by academics, including Ronald Salz of the University of Wisconsin–Madison, who based his 1997 commencement address on her work.

== Bibliography ==
Throughout her life Stalvey contributed to Reader's Digest, Woman's Day, Family Circle, and Good Housekeeping, as well as other magazines and several newspapers.

- The Education of a WASP. (1989 reprint) University of Wisconsin Press.
- Three to Get Ready: The Education of a White Family in Inner City Schools. (1997 reprint) University of Wisconsin Press.
- Getting ready: The education of a white family in inner city schools. Bantam Books. 1975.
- The Education of An Ordinary Woman. Aetheneum. 1982.
- "The Urban Child: Getting Ready for Failure." (1977) Children, Nature, and the Urban Environment: Proceedings of a Symposium-Fair. Gen. Tech. Rep. NE-30. Upper Darby, PA: U.S. Department of Agriculture, Forest Service, Northeastern Forest Experiment Station. p 38–41.

== See also ==
- Racial tension in Omaha, Nebraska
- Culture in Omaha
