= Salem Baptist Church =

Church building in Nebraska, United States of America

Coordinates: 41°16′51″N 95°57′31″W

Salem Baptist Church is located at 3131 Lake Street in North Omaha, Nebraska, United States. Founded in 1922, it has played important roles in the history of African Americans in Omaha, and in the city's religious community. Church leadership has impacted the city in a variety of ways, with long-time pastor Rev. J.C. Wade being recognized in the Congressional Record in 2000, and having an area post office named after him.

== See also ==
- History of North Omaha, Nebraska
- African Americans in Omaha, Nebraska
- Racial tension in Omaha, Nebraska
