= Arthur B. McCaw =

- Born: August 1, 1905; Fort Leavenworth, Kansas, U. S.
- Died: May 11, 1985 (aged 79); Kissimmee, Florida, United States
- Occupation: Civil servant
- Spouse: Valeria Lee

Arthur B. McCaw (August 1, 1905 - May 11, 1985) was a civil servant and civil rights activist active in Nebraska and as a United States Federal employee. He was the first black person to achieve a cabinet level position in the Nebraska governor's office, being appointed budget director in 1952. He was the chairman of the Nebraska chapter of the NAACP. He joined the International Cooperation Administration in South Korea in 1956, and then the Agency for International Development when he also served in Sudan. In 1969 he returned to the United States to work in the US Department of Agriculture on war on hunger programs.

== Early life ==
McCaw was born in Fort Leavenworth, Kansas where he had at least one brother, Herbert L. and three sisters, Bernice, Edith and Lucille. He received bachelor's and law degrees at the University of Nebraska at Omaha.

In 1942, McCaw was an officer of the Nebraska Conference on Inter-racial Social Action. He was appointed budget director of the state of Nebraska in 1952. Prior to that he was an assessor and on the tax appraisal board of Douglas County. In 1955 he was Nebraska state chairman of the NAACP and helped form a Lincoln chapter of the organization.

== International relations ==
He was appointed to the staff of the United States Operations Mission at Seoul, South Korea in late July 1956. In Korea, he became program officer of the International Cooperation Administration. His project included the development of the Chungje Fertilizer Plant and training of its workers, the transportation of oil from Pusan to the plant site, training agricultural workers, health and sanitation programs, rural villager living standard improvement assistance, and furnishing communications media. His wife, Valaria, had been an art teacher in Omaha, and worked with Korean artists to prepare pamphlets, books, posters, and exhibits for ICA demonstrations. He joined the Agency for International Development (AID) when it was organized in 1961. During the Johnson Administration, he became a White House adviser on matters of economic stabilization for the Dominican Republic. He later was a budget and financial officer for a White House committee on civil rights.

In 1966 was stationed in The Sudan with AID. While there, Valaria, continued to be active in art education, starting a class in ceramics at the Nour Institute for the Blind in Khartoum, Sudan. In 1968 where he became special assistant to the administrator for African programs in AID. In 1969, he became deputy administrator for food and nutritional services for the Agriculture Department.

== War on hunger ==
In 1969, McCaw began working for the US Department of Agriculture as a part of the War on Hunger program initiated by president Richard Nixon. 1970, McCaw was promoted to Deputy Administrator, Food and Nutrition Service in the department. McCaw retired from the Agriculture Department in 1978, and moved to Poinciana, Florida. McCaw died of cardiac arrest May 11, 1985 in Kissimmee, Florida at the age of 79.
