= Lucille Skaggs Edwards =

American journalist

Lucille B Skaggs Edwards
- Born: July , 1875; Washington, D.C., US
- Died: September 14, 1972 (aged 97)
- Occupations: Journalist, clerk
- Political party: Republican, then Democrat
- Spouse: August C. Edwards

Lucille Boynton Skaggs Edwards (July 23, 1875-Sept 14, 1972) was a journalist in Omaha, Nebraska. In 1906, she published The Women's Aurora, making her the first black woman to publish a magazine in Nebraska. She also worked as a political organizer and was a clerk in the district court.

== Life ==
She was born in July 1875 in Washington, D.C., and married to August C. Edwards in 1897. Before marrying, she worked as an English teacher, probably in Knoxville, Tennessee. She also lived in Alabama and Des Moines, Iowa, before settling in Omaha in the early 1900s. The couple had children: Toni, Gerald, Alie, and Marjorie. August was a general practice physician, and was president of the Negro Medical Society of Nebraska. In June 1926, August and Lucille divorced. Toni lived into her 100s and worked in bio-chemistry, running the chemical lab at the University of California Berkeley and working with Melvin Calvin.

Lucille Skaggs Edwards died on September 14, 1972, in Brooklyn, New York City, and is buried in the Maple Grove Cemetery in Queens.

== Career ==
In 1906, Edwards published The Women's Aurora, making her the first black woman to publish a magazine in Nebraska. She also worked as a stenographer in the office of the Clerk of the District Court, Frank McGrath.

She continued to write articles for Omaha newspapers, frequently focusing on topics of education and family life. In 1917, Edwards wrote an article for John Albert Williams' Monitor entitled "Our Women and Children", in which she writes, "Never has there been such a demand for trained men and women."

She was active in Republican politics for the first half of her life, and in the Catholic Church. In 1918, Edwards and Lula Lewis started a black Catholic missionary society which attracted the involvement of Father Francis Cassilly, a professor at Creighton University, and became Saint Benedict the Moor Church.

Her party affiliation changed by the 1930s. In 1931, during the administration of Democratic Mayor Richard Lee Metcalfe, she replaced Gertrude Lucas as head of the welfare board among the Omaha Black population. She supported Metcalfe in the 1933 election.

In 1934, she served as secretary under president John O. Wood, vice president Charles J. Coleman, and treasurer Minnie Griffin in an organization which sought to organize blacks living in North Omaha to support the Democratic Party. In 1936, she organized support for the candidacy of Terry Carpenter for US senator. She was also on the executive board of the women's division of the Douglas County Democratic Committee.
