= Hamitic League of the World =

African American nationalist organization

The Hamitic League of the World was an African American nationalist organization. Its declared aims were:

To inspire the Negro with new hopes; to make him openly proud of his race and of its great contributions to the religious development and civilization of mankind and to place in the hands of every race man and woman and child the facts which support the League's claim that the Negro Race is the greatest race the world has ever known.

The word Hamitic derives from Ham the son of Noah in the Old Testament. The organisation was founded in 1917 by George Wells Parker. In 1918 it published his pamphlet Children of the Sun. At this time Cyril Briggs also became the editor of their journal, The Crusader which subsequently became the journal of the African Blood Brotherhood.

== See also ==
- Civil Rights Movement in Omaha, Nebraska
