= Webster Telephone Exchange Building =

- U.S. National Register of Historic Places
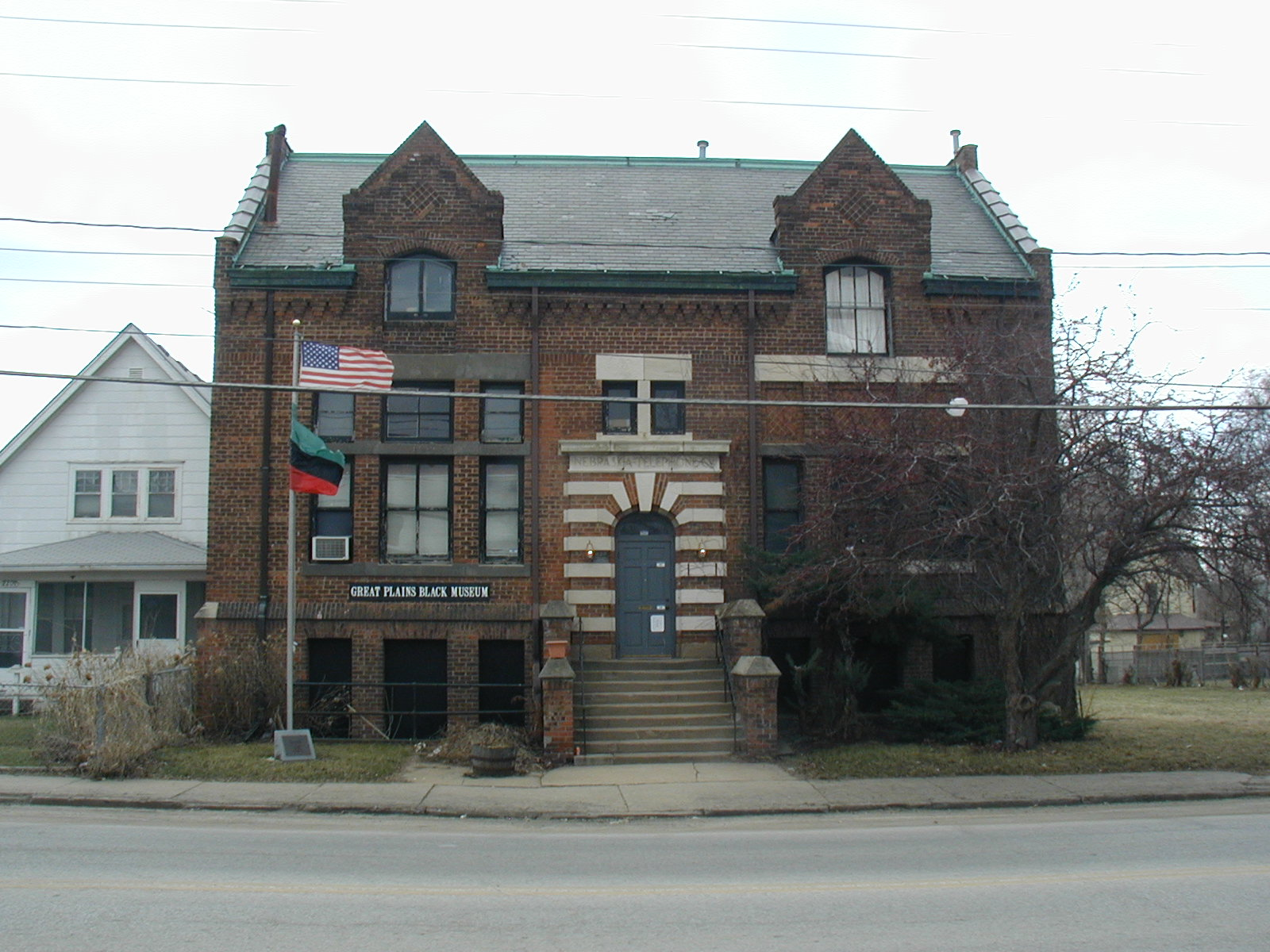
- The Webster Telephone Exchange Building

- Location within Nebraska Location within the United States
- Location: 2213 Lake Street, Omaha, Nebraska
- Coordinates: 41°16′52.51″N 95°56′43.55″W
- Built: 1907
- Architect: Thomas R. Kimball
- Architectural style: Tudor Revival
- NRHP reference No.: 77000829
- Added to NRHP: December 5, 1977

The Webster Telephone Exchange Building is located in North Omaha, Nebraska. It was designed by the well-known Omaha architect Thomas Rogers Kimball. After the Easter Sunday Tornado of 1913, the building was used as the center of recovery operations. In 1933, American Bell donated the building to the Omaha Urban League (now the Urban League of Nebraska).

The 33-room building is closely associated with Omaha's black history, serving as a home to Omaha's Urban League and its leader Whitney Young. In 1976 it was converted for use as the Great Plains Black History Museum. The building was listed on the National Register of Historic Places in 1977 and also designated a landmark by the City of Omaha.

== History ==
Originally titled “Lake Exchange”, the Webster Telephone Exchange building was opened June 9, 1907 by the Nebraska Telephone Company as one of their exchange buildings. The modified Tudor-style edifice was a central headquarters for recovery operations after the Easter Sunday Tornado of 1913. Telephone operators stayed at their stations during the tornado, and despite shards of glass and reports of mass calamity, continued service immediately afterwards. Victims from the nearby central business district of Near North Omaha were brought to the building, as well.

In 1933 the phone company donated the building to the Omaha chapter of the Urban League for use as the Mid-City Community Center. Serving the Near North Side neighborhood, the community center had a library, nursery, dental and medical clinics, and classrooms. The future national civil rights leader Whitney Young kept his offices there in the 1940s. The center was moved in 1956, after which the building was converted to apartments. During the 1960s it was used as the headquarters of Great Omaha Community Action. The building was purchased for use as a museum dedicated to the history of African Americans in 1975 by James T. and Bertha W. Calloway. Shortly after, the family donated the building to the newly organized Great Plains Black History Museum.

The building was added to the National Register of Historic Places in 1977, in recognition of its architectural and historic significance. It was closed to the public in 2004 due to the need to replace the 100-year-old roof and other needed improvements.

== See also ==
- History of North Omaha, Nebraska
- Landmarks in North Omaha, Nebraska
