= John Grant Pegg =

American civil leader (1868–1916)

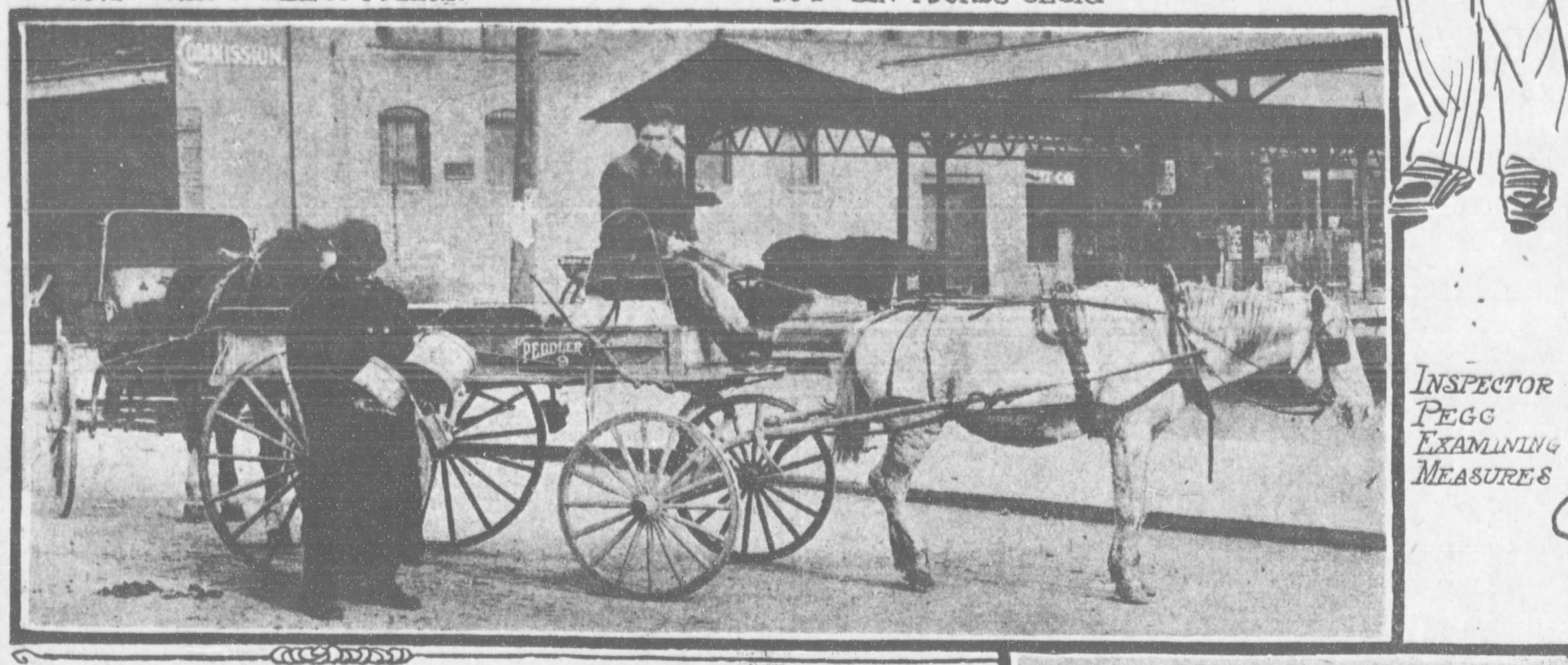
- Inspecting measures in 1910
- Born: 1868; Richmond, Virginia, US
- Died: August 3, 1916 (aged 47–48); Omaha, Nebraska, US
- Occupations: Inspector of Weights and Measures
- Political party: Republican
- Spouse: Mary Page

Religious life
- Religion: African Methodist Episcopal Church

John Grant Pegg (1868-August 3, 1916) was a political and civil leader in Omaha, Nebraska. He was a leader in the local African-American community and was the city inspector of weights and measures from 1906 until his death in 1916.

== Personal life ==
John Grant Pegg was born in Brushy Creek, South Carolina in 1868. As a boy, he moved to Kansas where he went to school. He was the oldest child and began work at an early age to help support his family. For a time working as a porter on the Atchison, Topeka, and Santa Fe Railroad passenger dining cars.. Pegg married Mary Page of Topeka, Kansas in 1899. They had five children: Mary, James, John, Ruth, and Gaitha. Four brothers and a sister survived him after his death: James, Henry, Charles, Bayliss, and Ida. Pegg's brother, Charles T. Pegg, was a Kinkaiderin the colored colony in Cherry County, Nebraska.

In Omaha, he was a Prince Hall Freemason and a member of the Rescue Lodge, No. 25, and a member of the First African Methodist Church. He was also a leader in the Omaha branch of the Knights of Tabor and Daughters.

In late September 1916, he had a paralytic stroke and he died on August 3, 1916, at his home in Omaha.

== Career ==
Pegg became involved in politics in the late 1880s. While living in Dunlap, Kansas in 1888, Pegg was an officer in an African-American Republican Club.

In 1899, he moved to Omaha, Nebraska where he became involved in local politics and became a leader in the black community there. In the early 1900s, Pegg was president of the Colored Men's Roosevelt Club in Omaha. In 1902, he worked with Thomas P. Mahammitt and to organize black opposition to the reelection of Congressman David Henry Mercer in favor of E. J. Cornish. Mercer's reelection was supported by some of Omaha's black leaders, including Victor B. Walker.

=== Local government ===
He also gained appointed positions in the local government. From 1901 to 1906 he served as a messenger for Republican Omaha Mayor Frank E. Moore. After Moore died in 1906, he was nominated by his successor, James C. Dahlman, a Democrat, to the position of inspector of weights and measures.

His candidacy for inspector of weights and measures was supported by democrats as well, and he was confirmed.

Pegg was very highly regarded in his position of inspector. In 1913, Pegg led an effort to create a state inspector of weights and measures whose jurisdiction would be small towns and villages who otherwise did not have such an officeholder.

=== Community leadership ===
Along with his increased role in city affairs, his role in local leadership increased. In 1907, he was the president of a local branch of the People's Mutual Interest Club, a group which included many prominent black Omahans. The club had branches in Kansas, Missouri, Iowa, and Nebraska and Pegg was named chairman of the executive committee of the association in late 1907. He was also a member of the Lincoln Club.

In the summer of 1908, Pegg attended the 1908 Republican National Convention as a page and doorkeeper. Later in 1908, he was elected president of the Interstate Literary Association of Kansas and the West with S. Joe Brown of Des Moines elected first vice president. Pegg's main opposition for the position was A. G. Hill of Des Moines, who was supported by Omahan Harrison J. Pinkett, while Pegg was supported by Omahan Henry V. Plummer. Pegg and Plummer's relationship later soured, although they appeared to bury the hatched in March 1909.

In 1911, Pegg was a leading opponent of a Jim Crow bill, HR 512, introduced by representative John William McKissick of Gage County. The bill died in committee after Pegg and a delegation of ten Omaha blacks spoke against the bill in the legislature. Along with Walker and Plummer, another collaborator with Pegg in efforts to increase black representation in local government positions was John Albert Williams, with whom he protested the demotion of black fire patrol captains later in 1911.

Pegg was a leader of the Negro Woman's Christian association and was chairman of a committee in that group which ran a home for the elderly. He was ousted from that position in March 1915 after a dispute over how to handle financial difficulties. In 1916, Pegg was elected chairman of the Western States Negro Republican Convention held in Kansas City. He died unexpectedly later that year.
