= Great Plains Black History Museum =

Coordinates: 41°16′53″N 95°56′44″W

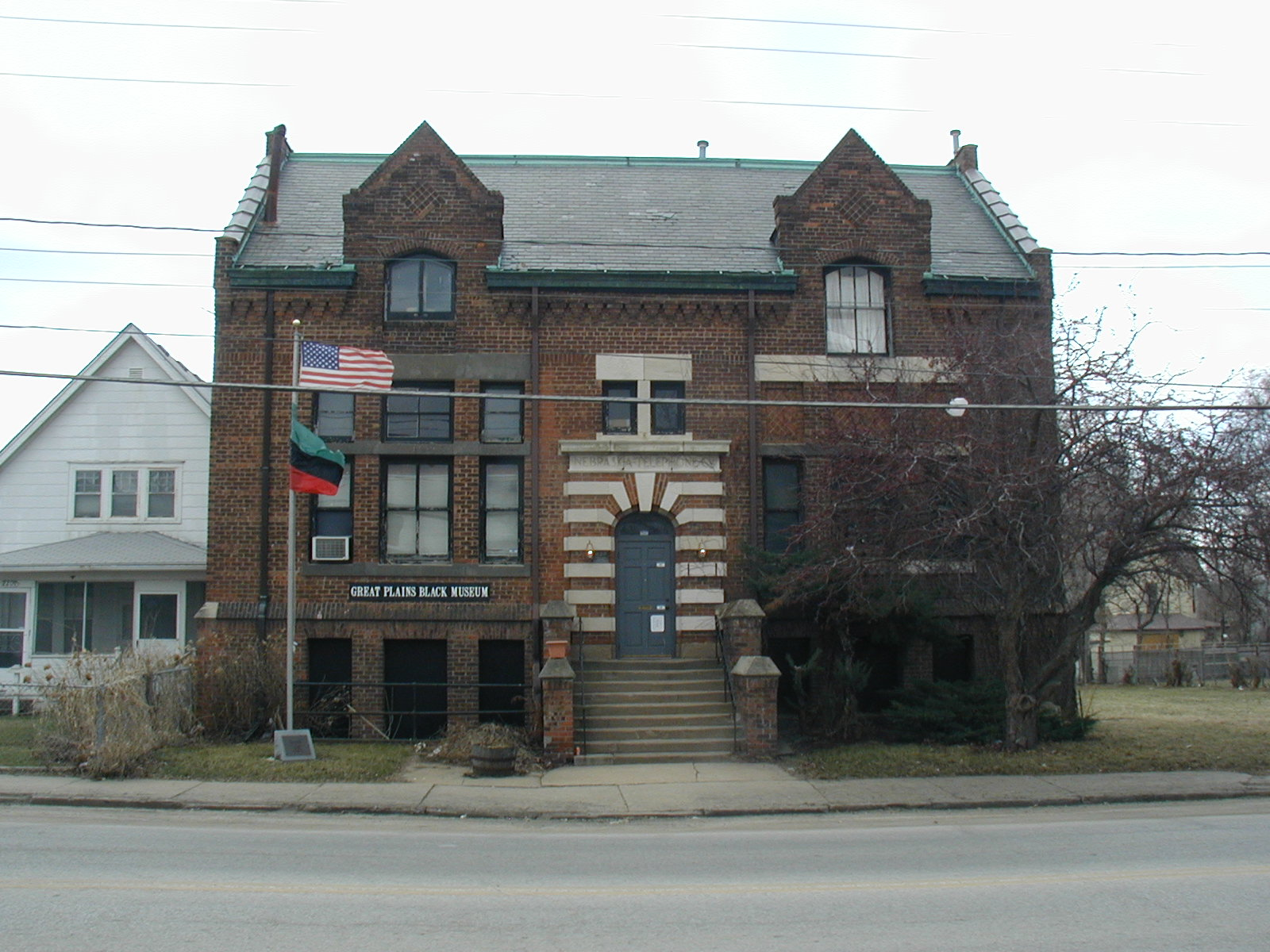
- Established: 1976
- Location: 2221 North 24th Street, Omaha, Nebraska
- Director: Eric L. Ewing
- Website: gpblackhistorymuseum.org

The Great Plains Black History Museum currently resides on the first floor of the historic Jewell Building in North Omaha, Nebraska. It was formerly located at 2213 Lake Street in the Near North Side neighborhood in North Omaha. It was housed in the Webster Telephone Exchange Building, which is listed on the National Register of Historic Places. A nationally renowned institution for more than 40 years, the museum includes more than 100,000 periodicals, manuscripts, photographs and research materials. The museum currently conducts programs and presents exhibits throughout Omaha, the State of Nebraska, regionally and nationally upon request.

It is the largest museum devoted to the black experience on the Great Plains.

== History ==
In 1962, Omaha community leader Bertha Calloway founded the Negro Historical Society. In 1976 she opened the Great Plains Black History Museum, in the Webster Telephone Exchange Building. This had been a community center for recovery efforts after the disastrous 1913 tornado. From 1933 to 1952, it was used by the Urban League as a community center, featuring a variety of services, such as medical, a library and others.

Calloway's goal over the next 25 years was to teach Nebraskans and other visitors about the contributions of African Americans in the Midwest. In a 1996 interview Calloway explained, "People must see black history in order for the images they have of black people to change. That’s what our museum is all about ... revealing a history that’s been withheld." In 1976 Calloway opened the museum, aided by a $100,000 grant from the United States Bicentennial Commission.

Since then, the museum has featured paintings, rare books, photographs, and films of the African-American experience in the Midwest. Most African Americans arrived in the Midwest from the South during the first half of the 20th century, in two waves of the Great Migration. The museum chronicles their transformation into urban workers, the development of churches and other community institutions; and music, literature and other cultures. The museum is one of the largest historical and cultural institutions devoted to African-American life west of the Mississippi River.

The museum closed in 2001 after the director Jim Calloway, the son of founder Bertha Calloway, failed to get what he thought was the needed level of funding from the City of Omaha and Douglas County after relying on that funding since the beginning of the museum. The building needs renovation and the museum may consider moving to another facility, or running exhibits for some time in other venues. It has arranged to have the Nebraska State Historical Society take temporary custodial care of the materials. Their staff has been cataloging documents and photographs housed at the NSHS in Lincoln. As of 2010, the museum reorganized with a new board of directors, and in the spring of 2011 started a series of community meetings to discuss its future, including the possibility of exhibiting materials before a museum building is available. As the new president James Beatty says, "The building is closed but the museum is open!" The facility had been closed because of needed renovation but, as the board chairman and Museum President, James Beatty said, "The building is closed. The Museum is open." As of the spring of 2011, a new board was in place which was holding community meetings to broaden discussions of the museum's future.

In 2014 the museum moved to a space in the Crossroad Mall on 72nd and Dodge streets and was there until 2017 when the museum moved to a bigger space on the first floor of North Omaha's historic Jewell Building, 2221 N. 24th St. It hosts multiple exhibitions each year as well as public programs.

In 2022, the museum donated the Webster Telephone Exchange Building to the Bertha Calloway Foundation.

In 2026, the museum marked its 50th anniversary. Beginning in 2022, the museum partnered with the architecture firm Holland Basham Architects, a collaboration that culminated in the selection of a planned new facility site in North Omaha's Historic and Cultural District, adjacent to the museum's original location. As of February 2026, the planned facility carried an estimated cost of $15.2 million, with roughly 40 percent of that funding raised. Executive Director Eric Ewing stated the new building was planned to grow the museum's space from its then-current 1,200 square feet to approximately 18,000 square feet, while Holland Basham Architects' own project specifications list the planned building at approximately 20,000 square feet.

== See also ==
- History of North Omaha, Nebraska
- Landmarks in North Omaha, Nebraska
- List of museums focused on African Americans
