= Victor B. Walker =

American lawyer

- Born: 1864; Knox County, Tennessee, US
- Died: Unknown
- Occupations: Soldier, policeman, lawyer, saloon owner
- Political party: Republican
- Spouse: Barbara Seldon

Victor B. Walker (born 1864) was an African American soldier, political activist, lawyer, civil rights activist, police officer, saloon owner, journalist, and gangster in the Old West, particularly in Omaha, Nebraska, and in Denver, Colorado, at the end of the 19th and beginning of the 20th century. Before coming to Omaha, he was a Buffalo soldier on the frontier, and when he first arrived in the city, he worked as a police officer. For a short time, he owned the Omaha saloon The Midway, a center of gambling and criminal activity in the city. As well as a working as defense lawyer, he worked for civil rights and was a member of the Omaha Afro-American League, a civil rights organization in the city.

In 1902, he had a dispute with Omaha political and criminal boss, Tom Dennison, which resulted in Walker's beating at the hands of an Omaha police and an end to his political ambitions in Omaha. He moved to Denver, Colorado, where he ran a club, "The Rocky Mountain Athletic Club". He was appointed deputy sheriff in that city and briefly ran a weekly newspaper, New American Weekly. He was heavily involved in criminal activity in Omaha and Denver, particularly voting fraud and gambling, and in Denver was known as the "King of the colored underworld".

== Early life ==
Victor Beaman Walker was born in Knox County, Tennessee in 1864 and lived in Knoxville until 1882. He enlisted in Troop A of the Ninth Cavalry (Buffalo soldiers) and was appointed non-commissioned officer. During Walker's time enlisted, the troop was stationed at Fort Elliott, Texas, and Fort Niobrara, Nebraska. Walker moved to Omaha in 1888 and in 1889 joined the Metropolitan Police force. He served for five years, and was for two years Court Officer, Deputy Chief of Police. He studied law at night and was admitted to the Douglass County Bar Association February 1895. In 1890, he married Barbara Selden of Washington, DC, and they had two children. He was described as a large, six-foot, 200-pound man. The couple moved to Denver in about 1910.

== Early activism ==
In the 1890s, Walker was an active member of the Omaha and Nebraska branches of the National Afro-American League, organizing the fourth annual state convention in 1893 and serving as secretary that year. The leaders at that meeting included Jessie Merriam, E. G. Rozzelle, and Silas Robbins. In 1895, he sought the position of captain of a black company of firemen being formed due in part to the efforts of Matthew Ricketts, Nebraska's first and to that time only black in the state legislature. Walker was politically active and supported the Republican cause within the black community. This brought him into opposition with African-American Democrats Cyrus D. Bell and Robbins, whom he challenged on economic policy. He participated in the Republican city conventions in 1894 and, in 1895, sought and gained the Republican nomination for Justice of the Peace, but later withdrew his name. In 1897, he campaigned on behalf of the Republican mayor Moores.

== Legal career ==
After passing the bar, in 1895, Walker worked primarily as a defense attorney for blacks in Omaha. He frequently supported African Americans in cases involving gambling or prostitution. In April 1895, he defended a man named Edgar Stanley (aka A. B. Burrus) who was charged with slandering the character of a young white woman. In that case, he was accused of threatening the woman and her family with greater exposure of the accusations against her character in the Omaha paper, the Progress (published by Ferdinand L. Barnett), if she did not drop the case. The Progress denied involvement, but the case was dropped. In 1896, he ran against Barnett for alternate to the Republican national convention, receiving the support of Matthew Ricketts on account of Barnett's tepid support for down-ticket Republicans in the 1895 election, and Walker received the honor. He frequently defended prostitutes and keepers of houses of prostitution; in 1896 taking the defense that his client, Gladys Bush, be allowed her business or that every similar house be closed. When Bush lost her case, he assisted in her filing complaints against fourteen other houses along Ninth Street, then called "The Row" or, more euphemistically, "the proscribed district" "red light district", or the "bad lands". In 1897, when his client, a landlady named Miller at another brothel at 201 N 9th Street was arrested for the robbery of a group of three travelers, Walker filed a complaint against the travelers for contributing to the support of a disorderly house, who were then themselves arrested although they were witnesses in the case against the landlady - much to the humor of the court which heard the case and accusation.

In the mid-1890s, two cases against black men in Omaha received great attention: the murder of Maude Rubel and the Rock Island train crash near Lincoln. Sam Payne was convicted for the murder, while George Washington Davis was convicted for sabotage in the train crash. Both cases were believed to be based on circumstantial evidence. Further, supporters believed Payne was not mentally able to give testimony in the case, and believed Davis was a scapegoat for corruption within the rail industry. Walker worked to exonerate these men, with George F. Franklin, Ella and Thomas P. Mahammitt, John Albert Williams, Millard F. Singleton, M. L. Wilson, and John W. Long playing important roles in rallying local support for the convicts.

Walker was also known for working with a number of disreputable professional bondsmen, including "Uncle John" John Flannigan, Olie Jackson and Chase Green. (Green was arrested during the Trans-Mississippi Exhibition for rooming with a white woman in a case where Walker served as bondsman.) Green and Olie Jackson were pressured out of their positions by an investigation in theOmaha World-Herald, and replaced by Scott Jackson.

In 1897, he ran for the position of Police Judge and, in 1898, he sought nomination to the Republican ticket for state legislature, but was not successful. In 1899, when the city prosecutor became sick, Walker was designated temporary city prosecutor.

At the outset of the Spanish–American War in 1898, Walker organized a company of black soldiers to serve in the Third Nebraska Regiment, where Walker was elected provisional captain, Henry Plummer first lieutenant, James H Bryant second lieutenant. S. B. Smith, J. H. Tucker, Walter J. Singleton, Robert Bryant, A. D. White, and Benton Hall were also involved in the recruitment. The company was not accepted as the Third Nebraska Volunteer Infantry was not enlisted until July 1899. While some of the men recruited served in other companies, Walker remained in Omaha.

He was involved in the Negro Press Association and when the group met in Omaha during the Trans-Mississippi Exposition in August 1898, he gave a talk about the relationship between press and the law. In November and December 1898, Omaha blacks gathered to call for federal intervention against the lynchings and violence in the south, such as the Wilmington massacre. Millard F. Singleton, John Albert Williams, E. H. Hall, Walker and others were important leaders in those efforts.

== Relationship with Tom Dennison ==
Tom Dennison arrived in Omaha in the 1880s and set about creating a criminal and political alliance which would come to influence Omaha politics until his death in 1934. Walker's connections with the African-American community, with houses of gambling and prostitution, and with the legal system were useful to Dennison, and in 1898 Dennison financed Walker's purchase of a salon, "The Midway", at 12th and Capitol Ave, from Oscar Picketts, with whom Dennison had a dispute. At this time, Walker was considered Denisson's black lieutenant and called "King of the Midway". It was claimed that the services Walker provided Dennison's political machine included ballot stuffing and registration falsification. It was also suggested that Walker installed an opium den in the basement of the Midland

In 1898, Edward Rosewater, a friend of Dennison's, withdrew political support for Walker as candidate for the State House of Representatives but only after Walker had supported Rosewater. Walker was incensed, and strongly spoke against Rosewater's duplicity, but the dispute was smoothed over due to Dennison's influence and political power, and Walker again supported Rosewater in 1899 for Rosewater's senatorial campaign.

Soon, Walker fell out of favor for insufficiently supporting Dennison's choices in an election, and lost ownership of the Midway. In frustration, Walker left town, spending a short period in St. Louis, Missouri. When he returned, he began to prosecute allies of Dennison, seeking retribution. He also filed charges of corruption against officers of the police force. Under the instruction of Denisson, police officers Martin Shields with the aid of John Brady attacked Walker on February 26, 1902, charging him with carrying a concealed weapon and resisting an officer, beating Walker severely. The case against Walker did not hold, and Walker pressed charges against Shields, stating that he believed Shields wanted to kill him. Shields' defense attorney Fred L. Smith was accused of intimidating witnesses to leave town, and during the trial witnesses were not to be found and Shields was found not guilty.

Walker supported Erastus Benson for mayor in 1906 against the candidate Dennison supported, James Dahlman. In that election, Dahlman won his first of eight terms. About that time, Walker left Omaha, taking a job as a waiter for the Union Pacific Railroad.

== Denver, Colorado ==
By 1910, Walker and his wife moved to Denver, Colorado, where he joined the Colored Citizen's Non-Partisan League of Denver. He remained politically active, and his connections earned him numerous government appointments. In 1916, Walker was appointed guard in the Denver county jail by Mayor Robert W. Speer and in December that year was appointed messenger by state auditor-elect Charles Leckenby and secretary of state-elect James Noland In 1919, Walker was rewarded for his support of Mayor Dewey C. Bailey in his election by being appointed deputy sheriff. This support was not believed to be entirely legal. In 1920, Walker was accused of intimidating voters and of replacing ballots of others with his own.

In Denver, he opened a club called the "Rocky Mountain Athletic Club", which included both athletic and social aspects and which frequently put him afoul of the law. In 1910, he was fined for not having the proper alcohol licenses. Walker's club was frequently raided for breaking laws against gambling, but those arrested were almost always able to escape prosecution. Walker's role in this earned him the nickname, "King of the colored underworld of Denver" and, in spite of his troubles, he was able to keep his position as deputy sheriff until the early 1920s. In 1918, Walker's confederate, Elias Jackson, shot a man named Morris Kirkland when Kirkland attacked Walker outside of his club. He offered to help organize a volunteer Colorado black regiment when the United States joined World War I; however, unlike previous wars, US forces in the war were organized at a federal and not a state level.

In 1921, he created a bond company in Denver with George Gross, Paxton Boyer, Robert Bryant and Victor's wife, Barbara. In 1921 to 1922, Walker began and edited the weekly newspaper, New American Weekly. In 1924, he was convicted on charges of criminal libel.
