= Moorer =

Moorer is a surname. Notable people with the surname include:

- Allison Moorer (born 1972), alternative country singer, sister of Shelby Lynne
- Cleamon Moorer, American entrepreneur, author, and scholar
- Jacob Moorer (1863–1935), South Carolina lawyer and civil rights activist
- James A. Moorer (born 1945), digital audio and computer music engineer
- Joseph P. Moorer (1922–2014), U.S. vice admiral
- Lizelia Augusta Jenkins Moorer (1868–1936), South Carolina poet and teacher
- MC Lyte (born 1971), hip-hop artist with given name Lana Moorer
- Michael Moorer (born 1967), boxer and former WBA & IBF world champion
- Shelby Lynne (born Shelby Lynn Moorer, 1968), American singer and songwriter
- Stephen Moorer (born 1961), Californian actor, director and producer of live theatre
- Terry F. Moorer (born 1961), United States District Judge
- Thomas H. Moorer (1912–2004), U.S. admiral, Chief of Naval Operations, Chairman of the Joint Chiefs of Staff

== See also ==
- Drewry-Mitchell-Moorer House, a historic mansion in Eufaula, Alabama, U.S.
