= James Bryant (journalist) =

American journalist

James S. Bryant (1869-after 1903) was a journalist and civil rights activist in Omaha, Nebraska. He worked with Ferdinand L. Barnett on his paper, The Progress in the 1890s.

Bryant moved to Omaha from Louisville, Kentucky, in 1890. There he served as a lawyer on the circuit court. He was admitted to the district court in Omaha in April 1890, becoming the second African American among 340 total who served in that capacity.

In 1890, he was a member of a national building, loan, and protective union organized to assist Omaha blacks to buy or build a home. The local board of the group consisted of president George F. Franklin, vice president William Marshall, Secretary and Treasurer Alfred S. Barnett, Attorney James S. Bryant. The Board of Appraisers was Millard F. Singleton, Alphonso Wilson, and Harrison Buckner.

In 1894, he was an officer of the Afro American Fair association in Omaha with A. D. White and S. G. Ernest. In this capacity, he disputed with Cyrus D. Bell, who was editor of a rival paper, over the organization and activities of the group. He was also an officer of the Union League club led By Matthew Ricketts along with H. J. Granby and Alphonso Wilson. In 1895, he was a delegate to the state meeting of the National Afro-American League, along with Franklin, Singleton, and Ricketts.

He also worked in the city comptroller's office. He had a daughter in about 1879. His wife, Lena L nee Hartfeld Bryant, died on November 18, 1896.

In 1898, Bryant was named a second Lieutenant with the "colored volunteer militia company."

Bryant was implicated in an attack on his wife's mother in 1903. In a report from the Omaha World-Herald, he was said to be drunk when he cut her with a razor. Eight stitches were required to close the two-inch cut across her neck.

After that Bryant disappears from the public record.
