= Alphonso Wilson =

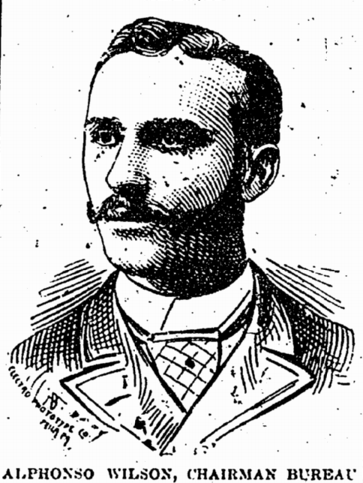
- Phototype from the Progress, June 21, 1890
- Born: 1860; Bedford, Missouri, U.S.
- Died: December 4, 1936 (aged 76); Omaha, Nebraska, U.S.
- Occupation: Real Estate
- Political party: Republican
- Spouse: Kathryn
- Children: 2

Alphonso Wilson (December 4, 1860 – 1936) was an African-American activist in Omaha, Nebraska, at the turn of the 20th century. Wilson was born in Bedford, Missouri in 1860. In 1880 he moved to Chicago and in 1886 he moved to Omaha. In Omaha he was a partner of the real estate firm Wilson & Bryant with James Bryant. In 1890 he was elected the Chairman of the Bureau of Immigration of the Nebraska branch of the National Afro-American League under president Matthew Ricketts. He also served as treasurer and a founding member of the Omaha Union League club, a social club and lyceum formed in 1895. In 1890, he was a member of a national building, loan, and protective union organized to assist Omaha blacks to buy or build a home. The local board of the group consisted of president George F. Franklin, vice president William Marshall, Secretary and Treasurer Alfred S. Barnett and Attorney James S. Bryant. The Board of Appraisers was Millard F. Singleton, Alphonso Wilson, and Harrison Buckner.

He was a delegate to the state republican convention in 1896 and 1901. He and his wife were very musical, and he performed on violin with Dan Desdunes. Later in his life he worked as a steward for the Metropolitan Club and then the University Club in Omaha. He also was a treasurer and trustee for Excelsior Masonic Lodge. He was married to Kathryn and had two sons, Alphonso and Thomas. Wilson died at age 76 on December 3, 1939. His wife was born in St. Joseph, Missouri on April 1, 1870 and died in Omaha in 1952. She was the founder of the California Beauty School, called the "oldest beauty school west of Chicago".
