= Millard F. Singleton =

African-American political leader and civil servant (1859–1939)

- Born: Millard Filmore Singleton; November 14, 1859; Virginia
- Died: November 12, 1939 (aged 79); Omaha, Nebraska, United States
- Occupation: civil servant
- Political party: Republican
- Spouse: Blanche Ellen Braxton (m. 1881)
- Children: 5

Millard Filmore Singleton (November 14, 1859 – November 12, 1939) was an African-American political leader and civil servant in Omaha Nebraska. He was an officer in the Omaha Colored Republican Club and the Omaha branch of the National Afro-American League. He held posts as Justice of the Peace, storekeeper in the United States Internal Revenue Service, recorder of deeds for the city, and as bailiff of the municipal court.

== Life ==
Singleton was born on November 14, 1859 in Virginia near Washington, D.C. In 1881 he married Blanche Ellen Braxton and came to Omaha in 1883 with his brother, Walter J. Singleton. He had two daughters, Bessie May and Amelia, and three sons, Millard F. Jr (who was called Guy), Clarence, and John. Clarence and John were prominent dentists in Omaha and John served a term in the state legislature and was an active member of the National Association for the Advancement of Colored People. Guy followed Millard as storekeeper and gauger in the revenue service. Guy's daughter, Constance, married Nebraska congressman John Adams, Jr. Millard Singleton died Sunday, November 12, 1939 in Omaha.

== Career ==
He was closely associated with state legislator M. O. Ricketts, and in 1889 was elected vice president of an Omaha Colored Republican Club led by Ricketts and chairman and A. H. Willis as president and was president in 1896 and 1912.

In 1890, he helped form a Nebraska branch of the Afro-American League in Omaha, where he was an officer and was the Nebraska representative to the Colored Men's convention. He represented Omaha on the national stage again as an alternate at the 1892 Republican National Convention in Minneapolis. In 1895, he was a delegate to the state meeting of the Afro American League, along with George F. Franklin, Millard F. Singleton, James Bryant, and Ricketts

In 1890, he was a member of a national building, loan, and protective union organized to assist Omaha blacks to buy or build a home. The local board of the group consisted of president George F. Franklin, vice president William Marshall, Secretary and Treasurer Alfred S. Barnett, Attorney James S. Bryant. The Board of Appraisers was Millard F. Singleton, Alphonso Wilson, and Harrison Buckner.

In the mid-1890s, two cases against black men in Omaha received great attention: the murder of Maude Rubel and the Rock Island train crash near Lincoln. Sam Payne was convicted for the murder, while George Washington Davis was convicted for sabotage in the train crash. Both cases were believed to be based on circumstantial evidence. Further, supporters believed Payne was not mentally able to give testimony in the case, and believed Davis was a scapegoat for corruption within the rail industry. Attorney Victor B. Walker worked to exonerate these men, with George F. Franklin, Ella and Thomas P. Mahammitt, John Albert Williams, Singleton, M. L. Wilson, and John W. Long playing important roles in rallying local support for the convicts.

In 1895, he was named a Justice of the Peace in the Eighth Ward in Omaha and was the Republican nominee for a seat in the state legislature to replace M. O. Ricketts in 1896, but lost. In 1904 he was appointed recorder of deeds of the city. In August 1906, black members of the Omaha community formed a group called the "Progressive League of Douglas County", led by Father John Albert Williams, to pressure the county Republicans to include blacks on the legislative ticket, in particular Singleton and Singleton was again a candidate in the republican primary of the legislature in 1912, again losing.

On the evening of April 16, 1930, two men placed an iron cross covered with oil-soaked burlap on the lawn of Singleton's son, John, and set it afire. John was away, but his wife and niece were there. Millard arrived shortly and tore down the cross in front of a large crowd.
