= John Adams Sr. (Nebraska politician) =

American politician, Nebraska

Member of the Nebraska Legislature from the 5th district
- In office 1949–1962
- Preceded by: Dr. Harry Foster
- Succeeded by: Edward Danner

Personal details
- Born: February 2, 1876 Atlanta, Georgia, U.S.
- Died: April 21, 1962 (aged 86) Omaha, Nebraska, U.S.
- Party: Republican
- Spouse: Hattie Bowman
- Education: Lincoln University, Yale University, Gammon Theological Seminary, and Campbell College
- Occupation: Minister and Lawyer

John Adams Sr. (February 2, 1876 – April 21, 1962) was an American minister, lawyer, and politician and a member of the unicameral Nebraska Legislature. He was born in Atlanta, Georgia, was a lawyer and minister in South Carolina, Washington state, and Colorado before settling in Omaha, Nebraska. While in South Carolina he took a civil rights case to the U.S. Supreme Court where he lost. He was the only Black member of the Nebraska Legislature for much of his tenure from 1949 to 1962. He was an ordained minister and at the time of his death was presiding elder of the African Methodist Episcopal Church (AME). As a legislator, he was an outspoken champion of civil rights and fought for fair employment practices and pensions for retired teachers.

== Life ==
Adams was born February 2, 1876, in Atlanta, Georgia, to the John and Belle Adams. On September 16, 1902 he married Hattie Edith Bowman daughter of John and Melissa Bowman in Wilmington, North Carolina. He attended high school in Atlanta public schools and attended Lincoln University in Pennsylvania, Yale University, Gammon Theological Seminary, and received a Masters of Arts from AME affiliated Campbell College in Jackson, Mississippi. He had three sons, John, Harold S. and Ralph W. John Jr. and Ralph joined John Sr. as partners in a law practice in the 1930s. John Adams Sr. died of a heart attack on the morning of Saturday, April 22, 1962. The Governor and many members of the state legislature attended his funeral.

== Career ==
While not formally trained as a lawyer, Adams was first admitted to the bar in South Carolina during the early 1900s. He practiced law in Orangeburg, South Carolina in a firm with Jacob Moorer, who was also black. In 1908, Moorer and Adams served as counsel for African American sharecropper Pink Franklin who killed a white constable who had come to arrest him, arguing that the act was in self-defense as Pink and his wife, Patsy, were both wounded and claimed the officer fired first. In a tense racial environment, Franklin was found guilty and sentenced to death by an all-white jury. Moorer and Adams appealed, challenging the racial composition of the grand jury and petit jury as well as the constitutionality of South Carolina's 1895 Constitution. They lost in state courts and appealed to the U.S. Supreme Court where they again lost in Franklin v. South Carolina. The case received national attention and finally in 1919, Franklin sentence was commuted and he was released on parole due to the continued efforts of Moorer and Adams, but also the efforts of Booker T. Washington, Oswald Garrison Villard, Joel Elias Spingarn, Frances Blascoer, Bernard Hagood, and Claude Sawyer That occasion marked the second time black lawyers had appeared before the Supreme Court. Adams left South Carolina after that case and moved to Washington State and then to Pueblo, Colorado where he continued to practice law. After moving to Omaha and was admitted to the Nebraska bar on motion in 1922. Adams also served as president of Daniel Payne University at Birmingham, Alabama in 1935 where he served for four years.

Adams' son, John Adams Jr. was a Nebraska State Legislator from 1935 to 1941. In 1942, John Jr. lost in an election against dentist Dr. Harry A Foster. In 1944, while Adams Jr. was serving in World War II, Adams Sr. decided to run for that seat, in Nebraska's fifth district, losing to Foster. Adams Sr. lost again in a primary in 1946. In 1948, Adams Sr. won, winning again against Foster in every election until 1962. As a legislator, he was an outspoken champion of civil rights and fought for fair employment practices and pensions for retired teachers. He also was known for his opposition to gambling and vehemently opposed the legalization of bingo.

Preceded by Dr. Harry Foster	Nebraska Legislature District 5; 1949–1962	Succeeded by Edward Danner
