= John Andrew Singleton =

American politician

Member of the Nebraska Legislature from the 9th district
- In office 1927–1928
- Preceded by: Walter Richard Johnson
- Succeeded by: Aaron Manasses McMillan

Personal details
- Born: July 30, 1895 Omaha, Nebraska, U.S.
- Died: August 1, 1970 (aged 75) Saint Thomas, U.S. Virgin Islands
- Party: Republican later Democrat
- Spouse: Daisy M Goring
- Education: Howard University
- Occupation: Dentist

John Andrew Singleton (July 30, 1895 - August 1, 1970) was a civil rights activist, dentist, and member of the Nebraska House of Representatives. He served as president of the Omaha, Nebraska, and then the Jamaica, New York, branches of the NAACP. He was an outspoken activist and received the nickname "the militant dentist" while living in Jamaica, New York.

== Life ==
Singleton was born July 30, 1895, in Omaha, Nebraska, to Millard F. Singleton, brother of Walter J. Singleton, and Blanch Ellen (Braxton). M.F. Singleton was named a Justice of the Peace in Douglas County in 1885, two years after his arrival in Omaha. In 1896 he secured the Republican nomination for a state legislature seat, but lost the election. He continued to be active in political and social affairs over the next decades.

Singleton attended Omaha public schools and Omaha Central High School and was active in drama. He was a member of Omaha's Du Bois Dramatic Club where he starred in William Ward Russ's "The Strike, Or Under the Shadow of a Crime". He also sang the lead role of David as a tenor in the cantata, "David, the Shephard Boy". On October 2, 1917, he married Daisy M Goring who was born in the Virgin Islands. Along with his brother, Clarence, John was a dentist, receiving his DDS degree from Howard University in Washington, D.C. and he also attended Creighton University for some period.

He moved from Omaha to Jamaica, NY in 1934 where he continued to work as a dentist. In 1949 he moved to the Virgin Islands on the recommendation of his doctor. He died August 1, 1970, in St Thomas, Virgin Islands at age 75 leaving a daughter and two sons.

== Career ==
=== Politics ===
An early example of Singleton's interest in civic activity came when he joined the leadership of Roosevelt Post No. 30, American Legion, where he was chosen as a Liaison Officer in 1924. In 1926, he ran against Walter R Johnson and John J Berry for the ninth district of the Nebraska house of Representatives. Previous to that date he had also held the position of Deputy Register of Deeds of Douglas County and had been a delegate to the Republican County Central Committee in 1926. The election was very racially charged, with Republican Singleton claiming, "Democrats had never helped the colored race", and in the final election he defeated Berry (1,495 votes to 1,131). Along with Ferdinand L. Barnett, he was one of two black men elected to the Nebraska House of Representatives that year. However, in 1928 he was defeated in the primary election by fellow Black Republican Aaron Manasses McMillan. He ran again in 1930, losing in the primary to E F Fogarty and to Johnny Owen in 1932.

In general, Singleton was supportive of the cities Republican mayors, saying that Mayor Dahlman and Mayor Richard Lee Metcalfe were friends to blacks. In 1926 he supported Omaha political boss Tom Dennison's Square Seven ticket and participated in an anti-KKK rally where he and other Republicans themselves dressed as KKK members in a cross burning of their own meant to smear opponents of Dennison's political machine.

=== Omaha branch of the NAACP ===
In 1929, Singleton was elected president of the Omaha branch of the National Association for the Advancement of Colored People, a post he held until 1933. In 1929, Singleton was active opposing segregation of prisoners at the girls youth prison in Geneva, Nebraska. He also played an important role in support of black living in North Platte who faced mob violence in that city after a police officer was killed on July 15, 1926. He, along with Harrison J. Pinkett and E W Killingsworth worked closely with the governor in reducing tension and allowing the people to return to their homes. He was endorsed by Governor Arthur J. Weaver and Mayor James Dahlman and received the support of Emmett Jay Scott for minister of the US to Liberia.

On the evening of April 16, 1930, two men placed an iron cross covered with oil-soaked burlap on the lawn of the Singleton home and set it afire. John's father, Millard, arrived and tore down the cross in front of a large crowd. In the period before that date he had presided over a visit and speech by national NAACP secretary, William Pickens, and was campaigning again in support of the square seven ticket, but no explicit cause was identified and the perpetrators were not caught.

In 1930, there was no law prohibiting blacks attending city pools. However, when blacks began visiting the McKinley Park pool June 6, 1930, whites at the pool and in the neighborhood reacted strongly. Confrontations over the following weeks occasionally turned violent and the pool was closed and drained for a period. Singleton supported desegregation of the pool and was generally against the mayor's plan to open new pools for blacks. He also spoke out against lynching and murder of Raymond Gunn in Maryville, Missouri. In 1931, a Negro regiment was stationed at Fort Omaha in the Miller Park neighborhood to great protest from whites in the area. Singleton along with Killingsworth (past commander of the Roosevelt Post of the American Legion) and Gene Thomas (past commander of the Legion Post of Spanish War Veterans) were instrumental in support of the troops In 1933 he left Omaha for Jamaica, Long Island, New York.

=== Jamaica branch of the NAACP ===
While in New York he served as president of the Jamaica branch of the NAACP from 1937 until at least 1942. By 1940 he had switched to the Democratic party and served was serving as Assistant National Director of the Colored Division of the Democratic Party. For his activism, especially in support of housing for the poor black of the city, he was called "militant dentist of Jamaica" and he was an important member of the 1941-1947 March on Washington Movement and worked closely with its leaders from the NAACP such as Walter Francis White. On January 2, 1945, he was elected to the NAACP Board of Directors.

Preceded by Walter Richard Johnson	Nebraska House of Representatives District 9; 1927-1928	Succeeded by Aaron Manasses McMillan
