= Alfred S. Barnett =

American journalist

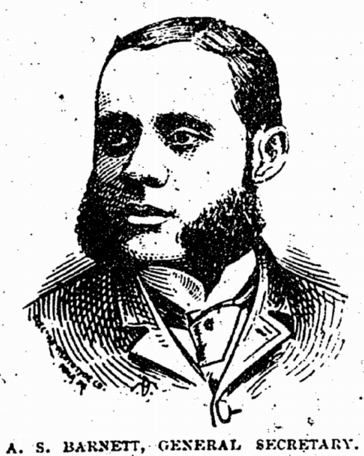
- Phototype from the Progress, June 21, 1890
- Born: December 27, 1858; Huntsville, Alabama, U.S.
- Occupation: Journalist
- Political party: Republican
- Spouse: Bessie Burfitt
- Relatives: Ferdinand L. Barnett (brother)

Alfred S. Barnett (December 27, 1858 – aft. 1905) was an American journalist and civil rights activist in Omaha, Nebraska, Des Moines, Iowa, and Chicago, Illinois. In Des Moines, Barnett created and ran the newspaper The Weekly Avalanche from 1891 to 1894. Before moving to Des Moines, he contributed to his brother, Ferdinand L. Barnett's Omaha paper, The Progress. He worked for civil rights also a member and an officer of numerous civil rights organizations, including the Nebraska branch of the National Afro-American League and the Afro-American Protective Association of Iowa. Barnett was described as a "pleasing speaker".

== Life ==
Barnett was born December 27, 1858, in Huntsville, Alabama to F. L. Barnett and Sarah Erskine. His brother, Ferdinand L. Barnett, was also a civil rights activist and journalist. Ferdinand was editor of The Progress an Omaha newspaper, and was elected to the Nebraska State House of Representatives in 1826.

At the age of ten, Alfred became responsible for himself. On August 31, 1882, he was married in Chicago to Bessie Burfitt and moved to Omaha. The couple had at least two children. In the late 1880s he worked in mortgage and loans, and was a census enumerator in the 1890 US Census.

Barnett was a cousin to Ferdinand Lee Barnett, husband of Ida B. Wells-Barnett.

== Omaha ==
In late 1889 and early 1890, Chicago's T. Thomas Fortune called for the organization of local leagues for the purpose of the advancement of blacks which would meet in January 1890 to form the National Afro-American League. On January 9, 1890, a meeting was held in Omaha to this effect. Edwin R. Overall was elected chairman of the meeting, and Barnett played a prominent role. Matthew Ricketts, Barnett, and Fred Thomas were selected to be the local league's delegates to the national convention of the league and Silas Robbins would attend the national convention as a delegate from the Republican Colored Club. The selection was disputed and eventually, Ricketts, A. L. Bennet, S. G. Thomas, Silas Robbins, and Overall attended. Later, in Mary of 1890, Barnett took part in a statewide meeting of black Nebraskans to discuss issues relating to equal rights, to form a permanent state league, and to support black people seeking to move to Nebraska to purchase homes and farms.

May 1, 1891, the Nebraska branch of the Afro-American League met again and Barnett was selected corresponding secretary. Ricketts was selected as president, B. F. C. Alberts as General secretary, W. A. Wigginton as treasurer, J. Smith of treasurer, and Silas Robbins as attorney. B. B. Walker, Thomas Carnahan, and Barnett were selected as delegates to that year's national convention in Knoxville.

In 1890, he was a member of a national building, loan, and protective union organized to assist Omaha blacks to buy or build a home. The local board of the group consisted of president George F. Franklin, vice president William Marshall, Secretary and Treasurer Alfred S. Barnett, Attorney James S. Bryant. The Board of Appraisers was Millard F. Singleton, Alphonso Wilson, and Harrison Buckner.

While in Omaha, Barnett was a frequent contributor to the paper, The Progress, of which Barnett's brother, Ferdinand, was editor and founder and which ran from 1889 to 1906. In 1891, Alfred Barnett moved to Des Moines.

== Des Moines ==
From 1891 to 1894, Barnett edited the Weekly Avalanche, which called itself the official organ of the "Afro-American Protective Association of Iowa" and having the slogan, "Equal Rights to All: Special Privileges to None". The Avalanche had a circulation of 2,300, but in August 1894, Barnett left the Avalanche after being arrested on charges of seduction. He and his family left Des Moines and Albert Lincoln Bell, a local attorney, managed the paper until it closed in October.

While in Iowa, Barnett was an active member of the Afro-American Protective Association of Iowa. In February 1894, he led the push to arrest and prosecute the proprietor of a restaurant for refusing to serve black members of the Iowa State Legislature at his restaurant.

== Chicago ==
After Des Moines, Barnett settled in Chicago where he worked as a police court clerk and as a lawyer. He remained active in civic affairs and was an officer of the Triangle and Inner Circle Club in Chicago in 1906.
