= Franklin v. South Carolina =

- Supreme Court of the United States

Argued April 20–21, 1910 Decided May 31, 1910
- Full case name: Franklin v. South Carolina
- Citations: 218 U.S. 161 (more) 30 S. Ct. 640; 54 L. Ed. 980

Holding
- Franklin's rights were not violated since election commissioners are only required to select men of good moral character and that competent blacks are equally eligible with others

Court membership
- Chief Justice Melville Fuller Associate Justices John M. Harlan · Edward D. White; Joseph McKenna · Oliver W. Holmes Jr. William R. Day · William H. Moody; Horace H. Lurton

Case opinion
- Majority: Day, joined by unanimous

Franklin v. South Carolina, 218 U.S. 161 (1910) appealed the conviction of Pink Franklin for the murder of South Carolina Constable Henry H. Valentine in 1907. Franklin was a sharecropper who wished to leave his employer although his employer had advanced Franklin wages under a contract based on the so-called "peonage laws". A warrant was obtained and when Valentine came to the house, a shootout occurred, killing Valentine and injuring Franklin, his wife Patsy, and another constable who was there. The defense included claims that Franklin acted in self-defense and that the peonage laws were unjust. In appeal, the defense claimed that the make-up of the jury, all white based on the requirement that the jury be based on those who were eligible to vote, was based on unconstitutional racism in election laws stemming from the 1895 South Carolina constitution. Franklin's conviction was upheld in all appeals, including the appeal before the United States Supreme Court heard in April 1910.

The case was the second time black South Carolina lawyers had appeared before the Supreme Court, and became famous for the issues involved. After the conviction was upheld, many figures associated both with Booker T. Washington and with the National Association for the Advancement of Colored People (NAACP) pressured and petitioned successive governors of South Carolina for clemency. Franklin's death penalty was commuted in 1910, and in 1919 his prison sentence was commuted and he was paroled. The case was one of the first times the nascent NAACP became involved in legal proceedings. It also was an example of the power of Washington's political influence.

== Events of the case ==
In 1907, African-American Pink Franklin was working as a contract farm laborer on the farm of Jake Thomas. Thomas had given Franklin some of his wages in advance, but Franklin was unhappy with his contract and left the farm. Thomas asked the local police to intervene, and on July 29, 1907, at 3:00 AM, Constable Henry H. Valentine and Constable Carter came to Franklin's house. A neighbor of Franklin's, Charles Spires, sometimes worked with Thomas and was on hand. Upon the Constables' instruction, Spires asked Franklin to plow his field, possibly through a closed front door. Franklin said that he would not, and that he might later in the day. Valentine broke into the house and was shot and killed by Franklin. Franklin, his wife, Patsy, and Constable Carter were also shot in the melee, all surviving. Franklin's young son was also home.

The Franklins fled, afraid that they might be lynched. They took refuge with ex-state Senator Stanwix Mayfield, and with his help turned themselves in to Orangeburg Sheriff John H. Dukes. Franklin's initial trial took place on September 9, 1907. P. T. Hildebrand and three other lawyers were the prosecution and Patsy was found not guilty, while Pink was found guilty in the one-day trial heard by judge J. C. Klugh. Franklin's defense lawyers were Jacob Moorer from Orangeburg and John Adams from Columbia.

The type of agricultural contract Franklin worked under was then and later called, "peonage laws". Franklin claimed that the constables broke into his house and did not identify themselves, and that he was acting in self-defense. The prosecution claimed that the doors were open and that the constables did announce their presence and identify themselves. Franklin's leaving the Thomas farm was legal, otherwise his contract would have, indeed, been illegal peonage, but the landowner had convinced officials to write a warrant for his arrest. Franklin was sentenced to hang after the initial trial, a sentence that was confirmed in a resentencing in early September 1910, with a date set in December to give chance for further appeal – Moorer and Adams stated they would appeal. The jury was all white and Moorer and Adams stated this was due to unconstitutional discrimination against blacks seeking to register to vote (and thus to be eligible for juries). It was reported that even trial judge Klugh believed that Franklin would not have been convicted if he were white.

== Appeal to the Supreme Court ==
The appeal was unsuccessful in South Carolina, and the case was appealed to the United States Supreme Court. Ex Attorney General Charles Bonaparte became involved in the case on behalf of the Constitution League and wrote a brief to the court. He refused to appear alongside Pink's black attorneys after his effort to take over the case was denied. Bonaparte had broad popular support for joining the case, but Adams and Moorer were determined to show that black lawyers could argue the case. Adams said that Bonaparte's submission of a brief in Franklin's appeal to the Supreme Court is, "The work of a few hot-headed negroes of Philadelphia, who have absolutely no authority to take such a step in the case". Adams and Moorer may have been willing to include Bonaparte as part of the defense team, but refused his aid when Bonaparte wanted to take charge of the case. Without Bonaparte in the chambers, Moorer and Adams argued their case April 20 and 21, 1910. The appeal was based in part on rules in South Carolina at that time that only people who could vote could serve on a jury. The lawyers argued that racist qualifications for voters in the Constitution of 1895 resulted in a jury of unjust make-up. However, the court found that black men of good moral character were equally eligible to serve on the jury and that there was no denial of rights on this account, issuing their decision on May 31, 1910 with the opinion of the court written by Justice Day and no concurring or dissenting opinion offered.

== Sentence commuted ==
After the trial, Moorer and Adams were joined by many others in seeking other means to save Franklin. Moorer and Adams petitioned June 25, 1910 to commute Franklin's sentence from death to life in prison. Boneparte felt that Adams and Moorer were wrong to remove him from the case. Journalist and early supporter of the NAACP, Oswald Garrison Villard wrote to Booker T. Washington, agreeing with Bonaparte and a similar view stated by Albert E. Pillsbury that Franklin was not well defended due to the "stupidity and conceit" of his counsel and asked Washington for his help. Washington and another NAACP activist, Joel Elias Spingarn, became involved. Washington contacted Taft, black legislator Thomas E. Miller, NAACP secretary Francis Blascoer, and others became involved and two white attorneys, Bernard Hagood and Claude Sawyer were hired to convince then South Carolina governor Martin Frederick Ansel to commute the decision.

Franklin's death sentence was commuted to life on December 30, 1910 coming into effect January 6, 1911, but Ansel's successor, Cole Blease, was not considered receptive to calls to repudiate injustice towards blacks. Eventually Franklin's sentence was commuted to 99 years on a chain gang and finally he was paroled after nine years. He was released in January 1919 on parole "during good behavior", his sentence commuted by South Carolina Governor Richard I. Manning.

== Aftermath ==
After his release, Franklin changed his name to Mack Rockingham and lived in Blackville, South Carolina with Patsy and two sons. He died in 1949.

Pointing to the key role that Washington and his contacts played in the case, some point to the affair as a failure by W. E. B. DuBois and the NAACP. The inability of NAACP leaders to help Franklin has been compared with the case of Steve Greene in 1910 (shortly after the Franklin case). Greene fled with a bullet wound in his shoulder to Chicago after killing an Arkansas farmer who tried to indenture or enslave Franklin on his farm. Greene was extradited to Arkansas, and was threatened with lynching. Ida B. Wells-Barnett's Negro Fellowship League raised money to organize a defense committee and safely bring Greene to Canada. Further, Washington was skeptical of legal solutions for Franklin in favor of political ones, a view that was ultimately validated. On the other hand, the NAACP saw Franklin's ultimate release as a success of their organization, and continues to claim that the case was their first case.

Peonage laws returned to the Supreme Court in 1911 when Alabama's peonage laws were overturned in Bailey v. Alabama.

== See also ==
- Burke, Lewis W. Pink Franklin v. South Carolina: The NAACP's First Case July, 2014 American Journal of Legal History 54 Am. J. Legal Hist. 265
