= Walter Singleton =

Walter Singleton may refer to:

- Walter K. Singleton (1944–1967), United States Marine Corps sergeant and Medal of Honor recipient
- Walter J. Singleton, American journalist and civil servant
