= Enterprise (Omaha) =

African American newspaper in Omaha, Nebraska

The Enterprise
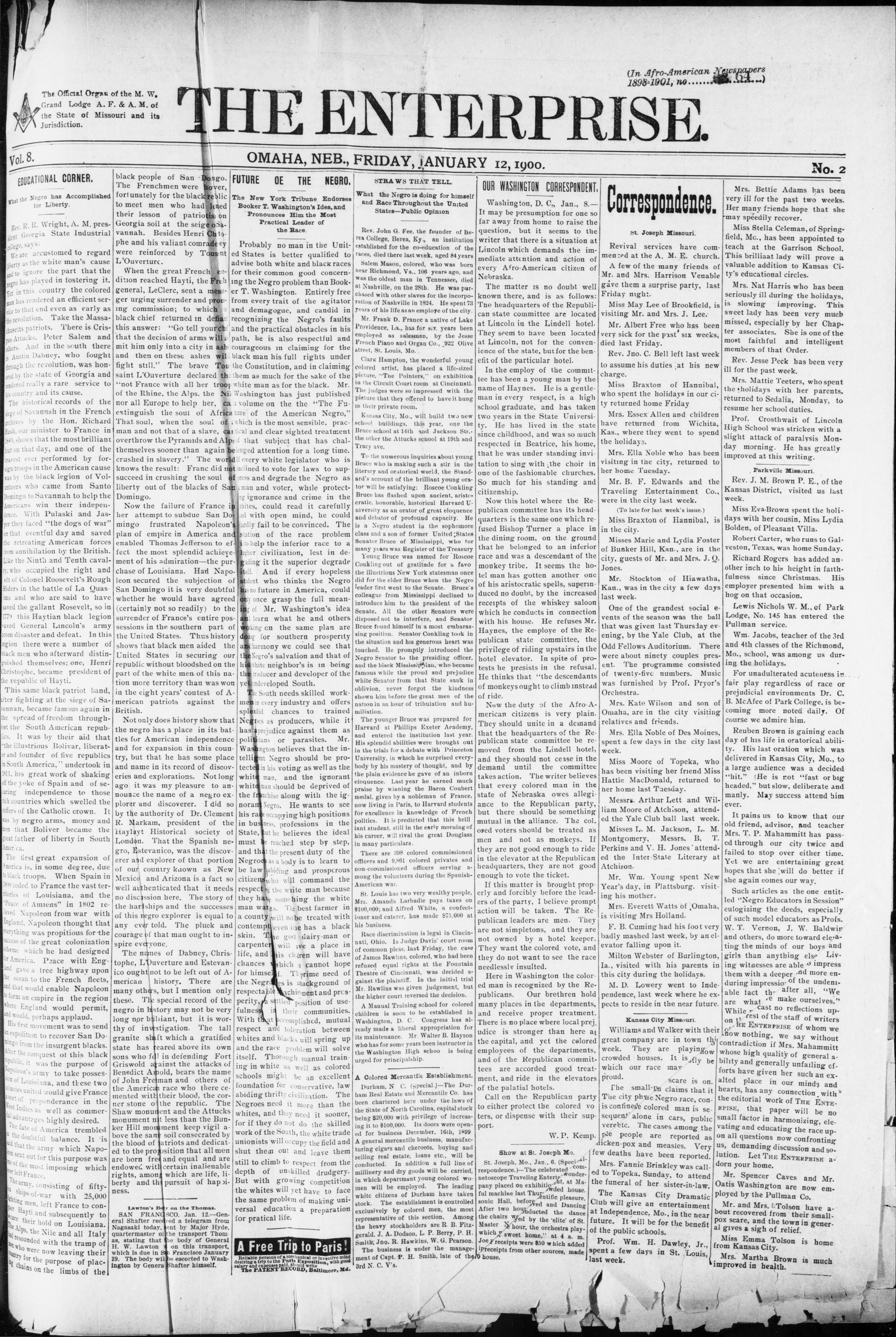
- Cover of the January 12, 1900, issue
- Publisher: Mahammitt & Smith
- City: Omaha, Nebraska
- Country: United States
- OCLC number: 10529510

The Enterprise was an African American newspaper in Omaha, Nebraska, United States, published from 1893 to 1914. Originally edited by George F. Franklin, the paper changed hands and was edited by Thomas P. Mahammitt for the bulk of its life. Compared to its contemporary African American paper in Omaha, the Afro-American Sentinel, it focused less on faith and culture, and had a more cautious view of war. The paper spawned the creation of a competitor, the short-lived Progressive Age, and after the paper folded, the Mission Monitor was expanded to fill its void.

== History ==
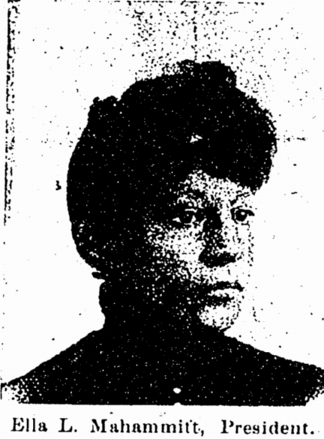
Ella Mahammitt in an issue of the Enterprise

The Enterprise was published between January 1893 and 1914. From 1893 to about 1900, it was edited by George F. Franklin, and was edited thereafter by Thomas P. Mahammitt. It was the official newspaper for the Nebraska State Afro-American League.

Sections of the paper included stories from others, personal news, church notices, and regular columns such as those by civil rights activist W. H. C. Stephenson and minister John Albert Williams. Ella Mahammitt, the wife of Thomas Mahammitt and a civil and women's rights activist in her own right, also had a weekly column on women's issues. (Note: She was also the president of Omaha's Colored Woman's Club.) It contained fewer serialized pieces of fiction than its contemporary African American paper in Omaha, the Afro-American Sentinel, and focused less on faith. It had correspondents from Nebraska, as well as several other states in the region. While at times it could be sensationalist, it frequently reported on instances of racism in Nebraska, and it endorsed the educational and industrial policies of Booker T. Washington. (Note: In the end, they rejected Washington's racial reconciliation views, just as the Afro-American Sentinel did.) It supported the Spanish–American War, but some of its writers believed at the same time that intervention in Cuba would result in the importation of the American color line. (Note: Ultimately, the Afro-American Sentinel was much more supportive of the war.) During the 1898 Trans-Mississippi Exposition—a world's fair in Omaha—the Enterprise urged the local black community to prepare exhibits because of the opportunity, and while they originally supported a separate "Negro building or department" at the exposition, the community as a whole opposed it. (Note: Franklin supported a separate department, and wrote in the Enterprise his reasons for supporting it.) Advertisements were placed by both black-owned and white-owned businesses, the latter of which brought considerable sums of money to the paper's operation.

In 1896, the Enterprise made mention of an unknown free silver black newspaper in Lincoln, even though the earliest known black newspaper in the city was founded in 1899, the Leader. In 1913, a competitor newspaper was launched by businessman G. Wade Obee for Omaha's black community, the Progressive Age. (Note: Only one copy of Obee's Progressive Age survives today, and it ceased publication in 1915.)

== Closure and access ==
The paper closed in 1914. John Albert Williams, who had contributed columns to the Enterprise before its closure, felt it was important to establish another African American paper for Nebraskans; he began publishing the Mission Monitor beyond his church audience as a result.

In 1941, the Committee on Negro Studies of the American Council of Learned Societies sponsored a historical preservation project, which included microfilming the Enterprise and several other African American newspapers. Two years of its run—1895 to 1897—are collected and available for viewing in the Omaha Public Library's main building. It is assigned OCLC number 10529510.

== Notes and references ==
=== Bibliography ===
- Mahammitt, Ella (August 17, 1895). "Woman's column". Enterprise.
- Paz, D.G. (1996). "The black press and the issues of race, politics, and culture on the Great Plains of Nebraska, 1865–1985". In Suggs, Henry Lewis (ed.). The black press in the middle west, 1865–1985. Greenwood Press.
- Peavler, David J. (July 2008). "African Americans in Omaha and the 1898 Trans-Mississippi and International Exposition". The Journal of African American History. 93 (3): 337–361. doi:10.1086/JAAHv93n3p337. S2CID 142257149.
- "The Enterprise". Chronicling America. Library of Congress.
- "Omaha Newspapers". Omaha Public Library.
