= Galangue =

- Commune
- Location in Angola
- Coordinates: 13°47′40″S 16°06′25″E
- Country: Angola
- Province: Huíla
- Time zone: UTC+1 (WAT)
- Climate: Aw

Galangue is a town and commune of Angola, located in the province of Huíla.

American doctor Aaron Manasses McMillan served as a medical missionary to Galangue from 1931 to 1948.

== See also ==
- Communes of Angola
