= Sarah Helen Mahammitt =

American caterer, chef and author of cookbooks

- Born: Sarah Helen Bradley Toliver c.1873 Canada or Michigan
- Died: November 26, 1956; Omaha, Nebraska, U.S.
- Occupations: Caterer, Author
- Spouse: Thomas P. Mahammitt (m. 1904; died 1950)

Sarah Helen Bradley Toliver Mahammitt (c.1873 – November 26, 1956) was a caterer, chef and author of cookbooks in Omaha, Nebraska. She studied at Le Cordon Bleu in Paris 1927 and sought to bring formal, European style cooking to African-American women in Omaha.

== Life ==
Sarah Helen Bradley Toliver was born around 1873 in either Canada or Michigan, to James H. Toliver and Sarah A. (Bently) Toliver. Sarah Bently was born in St. Thomas, Ontario. James Toliver was born in Covington, Kentucky, and went to Amherstburg, Ontario in the early 1850s, later to move to Ann Arbor, Michigan.

Helen married Thomas P. Mahammitt on May 25, 1904 in Des Moines, Iowa. He was previously married to Ella Mahammitt; they were separated at the time of her death in 1903. Thomas Mahammitt died March 28, 1950.

Sarah Toliver Mahammitt died November 26, 1956. Her funeral was at St. Philip's Episcopal Church and she was buried at Forest Lawn Cemetery.

== Career ==
Thomas worked as a caterer and Helen joined in. In 1910, Mahammitt traveled to Boston and attended Miss Farmer's Catering School. She catered many major Omaha events, including, for example, the wedding of Violet Joslyn and David Walter Magowan and Knights of Ak-Sar-Ben coronations.

Intending to retire, she traveled to Paris in June, 1927 on a vacation. She visited Le Courdon Bleu and was taken with the school, enrolling in a course. She learned French while taking classes and was inspired to continue working and to teach cooking when she returned to Omaha. She offered cooking and catering classes in Omaha, often free of charge. She also endorsed Omar Cake Mixes. She retired in 1950, when her husband died.

In 1939, she published a cookbook, Recipes and Domestic Service: The Mahammitt School of Cookery. Mahammitt's forward focused on her own experience and training and her interest in passing her skills on to others. The book focused mostly on non-southern fare. It self-consciously avoided food associated with poor blacks or southern slave culture. She recognized the racial aspect of her work, noting the need to be "diplomatic" at times and to "be tactful in bringing your superior knowledge into play" when interacting with white clientele, and that the black cook should pay attention to the maintenance of white clients' standing.

== Legacy ==
Los Angeles Times food writer, Toni Tipton-Martin, features Mahammitt's story in her book on the history of African American cooking, "The Jemima Code".

== Bibliography ==
- Mahammitt, Helen B. (1939). Recipes and Domestic Service: The Mahammitt School of Cookery.
