= Johnny Owen (Nebraska politician) =

American politician

Member of the Nebraska Legislature from the 9th (Representatives, 1935) district
- In office 1932–1935
- Preceded by: Ralph W Whited
- Succeeded by: John Adams, Jr

Personal details
- Born: February 11, 1907 Newport, Arkansas, U.S.
- Died: March 2, 1978 (aged 71) Inglewood, California, US
- Party: Democrat
- Spouse: Thelma King

Johnny Owen (February 11, 1907 - March 2, 1978) was an American Democratic politician and a member of the Nebraska House of Representatives representing Omaha. After serving in the legislature, Owen was an advocate for civil rights and was known as the "Negro mayor of Omaha".

== Life ==
Johnny Owen was born February 11, 1907, in Newport, Arkansas to Wilson N Owen and Fanie McCraty. Wilson worked as a Butcher at Swift and Company in Omaha and had two other children, Joseph and Lyria (Rogers). The family moved to Omaha in 1918. Johnny Owen went to Omaha South High School and was a four sport letter winner, Nebraska's only athlete to do so at the time (letters in track, football, basketball, and baseball). After graduating in 1927, Owen wished to go to the University of Nebraska but was denied on account of his skin color. Owen married Thelma M King, daughter of James H King and Florence Blaine on January 19, 1928. After high school Owen played amateur baseball in Omaha, playing for the Union Pacific Gold Coast team, the Culture Center Red Sox with his brother Joe, and the Daves Nine. Johnny's father, Wilson, died October 30, 1937.

Owen left Omaha in 1963 and later in life, Owen contracted cancer. Given three months to live in 1975, he believed the chemical Amygdalin marketed as the drug laetrile was responsible for extending his life. The drug was illegal in the United States, and so he moved to Los Angeles for the proximity to smuggled supplies from Mexico. Owens died on March 2, 1978, in Inglewood, California.

== Career ==
Before joining the state legislature, Owen worked as a truck driver for Royal Cleaners and was attending law school at Creighton University. His candidacy in 1932 for the ninth district of the Nebraska House of Representatives was supported by the Nebraska Negro Democratic club and by then Governor Charles W. Bryan and future US Congressman Edward R. Burke as well as by Kansas City's Dr. William J. Thompkins. One issue in the election was the position of the body on the Eighteenth Amendment, prohibiting alcohol, which Owen said he would vote to repeal. Owen defeated incumbent Republican John Andrew Singleton, John Newton, and George C Rothery (2,005 votes to 1,356, 143, and 924 respectively). As a legislator he sponsored an old-age assistance law and a bill for the reorganization of state and national banks. As a legislator, Owens fought for civil rights but faced personal discrimination, for instance at the Cornhusker Hotel in Lincoln, Nebraska, he was not allowed to use the elevator and had to climb the stairs.

In 1934, Owens was defeated by Republican John Adams, Jr (1,308 votes to 1,207; policeman Dan Phillips also ran and received 1,183 votes).

In spite of the loss, Owen's stature in Omaha continued to grow and he received the nickname, "Honorary Negro Mayor of Omaha" which he held for many years. He stood again in the primary for the same seat in the legislature, now called the fifth district of the new Unicameral in 1938, where he came in sixth. At that time he was working as a Clerk in the County Assessors office and was a deputy registrar of deeds. In that election he opposed increased taxation and favored progressive labor policies (minimum wage, maximum working hours law). In 1950 he was named president of Omaha's first black housing cooperative. The project was supported by the Omaha Urban League and the Federal Housing Authority who was represented by DeHart Hubbard at the group's founding. Supported by the NAACP, he was considered as a replacement City Councilman in 1951 while an employee of the post office.

On February 10, 1956, Omaha Police under the orders of Police Commissioner Henry Boesen performed a series of tavern raids wherein 57 people described by police as "vagrants, winos, and loiterers" were arrested. Owen, in his capacity as chairman of the Action Committee of the Near North Side led the outcry against what he called unfair arrests on a "wholesale basis". The issue at hand was whether the police action was consistent with police behavior in other, non-black areas of the city, although some activists, including representatives of the Omaha branch or the Urban League, NAACP, and African Methodist Episcopal Church felt that Owens protests went too far.

| Preceded by Ralph W Whited | Nebraska Legislature District 9; 1935-1937 | Succeeded by John Adams, Jr |
