= George F. Franklin =

American journalist

- Born: February 1852; Tennessee, U.S.
- Died: 1901 (aged 48–49); Denver, Colorado, U.S.
- Occupations: Journalist, civic leader
- Political party: Republican
- Spouse: Clara B. Williams

George F. Franklin (February 1852 – 1901) was a journalist and civic leader in Omaha, Nebraska, and Denver, Colorado. He owned and published two African-American newspapers, The Enterprise in Omaha, and The Denver Star (formerly The Statesman) in Denver. He was active in civil rights and was a member of the Nebraska branch of the National Afro-American League.

== Life ==
George F. Franklin was born in February 1852 in Tennessee. He moved to Texas where he had his first child, William, in 1872. He married Clara B. Williams in 1978 and the couple lived in Denison, Texas, and had a son, Chester A. Franklin. Chester founded a newspaper, The Call in Kansas City in 1919. Clara and Chester also contributed to The Enterprise and The Star, and Clara was an officer and a member of Omaha's Colored Woman's Club, run by Ella Mahammitt.

The Franklins moved to Omaha in the mid 1880s, and to Denver in 1898. While in Omaha, Franklin was a trustee at St. John's AME church, and in July 1897, Franklin opened a Real Estate and Rental Agency. George F. Franklin died in 1901.

== The Enterprise ==
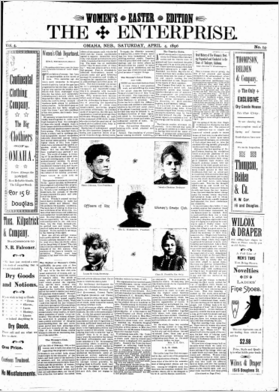
Cover of The Enterprise, April 4, 1896

In 1889, Ferdinand L. Barnett began publishing a black newspaper in Omaha called The Progress. In 1892 or 1893, Cyrus D. Bell established the Afro-American Sentinel and in 1893, Franklin began publishing the Enterprise. The Sentinel was noted in its pro-Democrat, pro-Grover Cleveland stance, and the three papers became rivals. In the wake of Booker T. Washington's 1895 Atlanta Compromise Speech, the three papers had different responses. Barnett's Progress opposed any sort of compromise, Franklin's Enterprise supported Washington's leadership in making a compromise, while Bell's Sentinel openly endorsed Washington's position. The three papers had a difficult coexistence, and The Enterprise outlived the other two, although Thomas P. Mahammitt took over the paper when Franklin left Omaha in 1898. In 1896, it was called by The National Protest the "best colored paper published in Omaha". John Albert Williams was a contributor to The Enterprise.

== Politics and civic employment ==
In 1890, he was a member of a national building, loan, and protective union organized to assist Omaha blacks to buy or build a home. The local board of the group consisted of president George F. Franklin, vice president William Marshall, Secretary and Treasurer Alfred S. Barnett, Attorney James S. Bryant. The Board of Appraisers was Millard F. Singleton, Alphonso Wilson, and Harrison Buckner.

Franklin was frequently involved in Omaha Republican politics. He attended the 1889 State Republican Convention, and frequently attended city and county republican meetings, for instance being a member of the Republican county central committee in 1895. In 1894 and 1895, Franklin was elected to the position of assessor in Omaha's fifth ward

In 1896, he received the support of the Omaha Colored Woman's Club and its president, Ella Mahammitt, John Albert Williams, and Dr. Stephenson for the position of Inspector of Weights and Measures. Ella Mahammitt wrote that he "is doing more for the colored people of Omaha than any other man engaged in public affairs". This was strongly opposed by Cyrus D. Bell, who in his paper, The Afro-American Sentinel, attacked Franklin's character and accused Franklin of defrauding the Society of Odd Fellows, a civic club of which they both were members Franklin was installed to the position by Mayor Broach. Holding both the county position of assessor and the city position of inspector of weights and measures was considered somewhat controversial, but was allowed.

== Civil rights ==
In the early 1890s, Franklin joined the Nebraska branch of T. Thomas Fortune's National Afro-American League. The league began in Omaha in early 1890, and on April 30, 1890, after Matthew Ricketts and a number of other leaders attended the first national meeting of the league, black Omaha leaders including Franklin called for a meeting of black Nebraskans to discuss issues relating to equal rights, to form a permanent state league, and to support black people seeking to move to Nebraska to purchase homes and farms. In 1895, Franklin, Millard F. Singleton, Ricketts, and James Bryant were the Omaha delegates to the state meeting of the National Afro-American League.

In the mid-1890s, two cases against black men in Omaha received great attention: the murder of Maude Rubel and the Rock Island train crash near Lincoln. Sam Payne was convicted for the murder, while George Washington Davis was convicted for sabotage in the train crash. Both cases were believed to be based on circumstantial evidence. Further, supporters believed Payne was not mentally able to give testimony in the case, and believed Davis was a scapegoat for corruption within the rail industry. Attorney Victor B. Walker worked to exonerate these men, with Franklin, Ella and Thomas P. Mahammitt, John Albert Williams, M. F. Singleton, M. L. Wilson, and John W. Long playing important roles in rallying local support for the convicts.

=== Tennessee and Omaha expositions ===
In the late 1890s, Omaha blacks sought to use the 1897 Tennessee Centennial and International Exposition in Nashville and the 1898 Trans-Mississippi Exposition in Omaha to bring attention to the role of African Americans in Nebraska. J. C. C. Owens, M. O. Ricketts, T. P. Mahammitt, Franklin, George E. Collins, John Wright, J. W. Long all played key roles in organizing the efforts. They succeeded in sending a delegation to the Tennessee exhibition, and in securing central presence of African-Americans in the Omaha exhibition. For organizing black representation at the Omaha exhibition, Edwin R. Overall, John Albert Williams and Cyrus D. Bell played especially important roles. Franklin was very involved in the various meetings of national black organizations took place during the exposition, including a Congress of Representatives of White and Colored Americans organized and a meeting of the National Colored Press Association on August 22.

The relationship between erstwhile political allies Franklin, F. L. Barnett, M. F. Singleton, and M. O. Ricketts fractured in the buildup to the expositions over the lack of inclusion of blacks in the city's organizational ranks. In The Progress, Barnett considered Singleton and Franklin's support for the expositions hypocritical, as Franklin was slow in paying his stock subscription to the exposition and did not press enough for employment of blacks in the buildup to the exposition. Franklin countered that Matthew Ricketts, who was a member of the state house of representatives, was not doing enough to push for black employment in government positions, and that The Progress should question its support for Ricketts. In The Sentinel, Cyrus D. Bell, Omaha's preeminent black Democrat, felt that Ricketts' greed for power was at the root of the problem and was critical of Franklin as well.

== The Denver Star ==
Franklin moved with his family to Denver in 1898 where he purchased the newspaper, The Statesman, owned by Edwin Henry Hackley, husband of Emma Azalia Hackley. He renamed the paper The Denver Star. After his death in 1901, his wife, Clara, and son, Chester, continued to publish the paper.
