= Aaron Manasses McMillan =

American politician

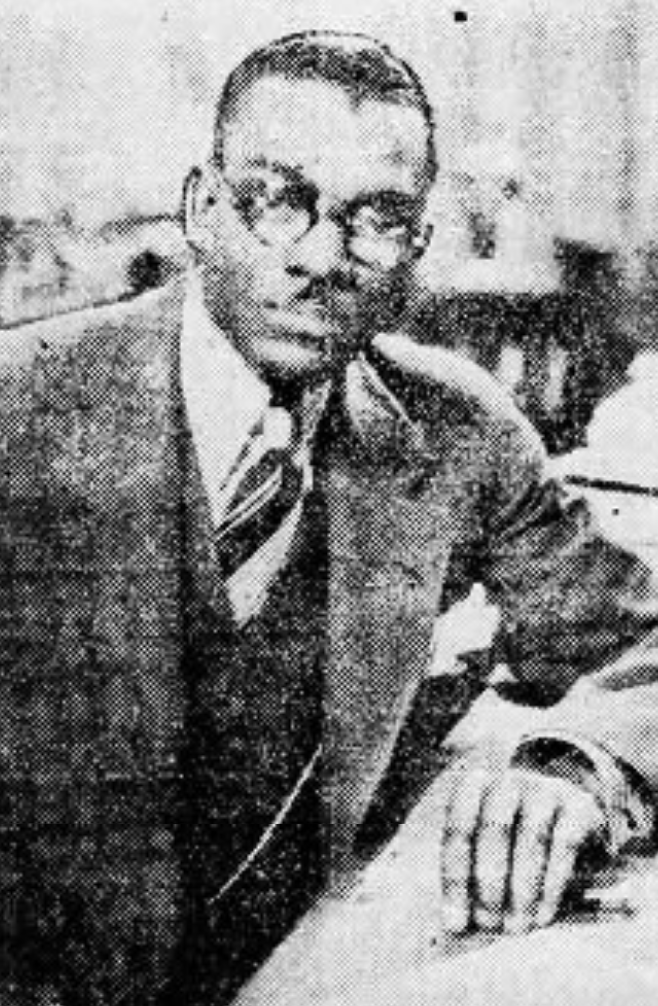
- McMillan, from a 1930 newspaper

Member of the Nebraska Legislature from the 9th (Representatives, 1928) district
- In office 1929–1930
- Preceded by: John Andrew Singleton
- Succeeded by: Ralph W Whited

Personal details
- Born: November 3, 1895 Cotton Plant, Arkansas, U.S.
- Died: June 1, 1980 (aged 84) Westwood, Los Angeles, U.S.
- Party: Republican
- Spouse: Willena Cooper
- Education: Bishop College; Meharry Medical College; Lisbon School of Tropical Medicine
- Occupation: Doctor

Aaron Manasses McMillan (November 3, 1895 – June 1, 1980) was a medical missionary to Angola and a civic leader and legislator in Nebraska. He was elected to the Nebraska House of Representatives in 1928 as a Republican and served one term. He then was invited by the American Board of Commissioners for Foreign Missions and the Black Congregational Church to serve as a medical missionary in Galangue, Portuguese West Africa, where he worked from 1931 to 1948. After returning to Omaha, Nebraska, he was involved in the Omaha Branch of the NAACP, served on the board of the Omaha Housing Authority, and continued to work as a medical doctor.

== Early life ==
Mcmillan was born in Cotton Plant, Arkansas, November 3, 1895, to Reverend Henry R. McMillan and his wife Sarah. He had two brothers, William and Samuel. On November 8, 1910, he married Willena Cooper of Fort Worth, Texas. His ancestors were Haitians and came to the United States in 1870. He claimed descent from slaves taken from Africa to Haiti in 1568 by slave traders Sir John Hawkins and Sir Francis Drake.

McMillan graduated from Cotton Plant Academy in 1915, from Bishop College in Dallas in 1919, and from Meharry Medical College in Nashville in 1923. Willena also graduated from Bishop College in Dallas and taught at Houston College and Texas A&M College in Fort Worth. The couple had two sons, Aaron and Robert, born before leaving for Angola, and one daughter, Helen, born in Angola.

Aaron's father was a Baptist minister at Mount Moriah Baptist Church in Omaha, and Aaron moved to Omaha in 1922 after visiting his father.

== Political career ==
McMillan was a last-minute addition to the 1928 primary ballot for the ninth district of the Nebraska House of Representatives, where he defeated dentist John Andrew Singleton. He went on and won the seat in the November general election against Albert Kaplan (2,199 votes to 1,987). Before moving to Africa, he was a member of the Douglas County Republican Committee and delegate to the state Republican convention.

== Missionary work ==
In 1928, McMillan was invited by the American Board of Commissioners for Foreign Missions to become medical supervisor of a mission in Portuguese West Africa. In order to work in a Portuguese colony, McMillan needed Portuguese medical qualification, and on September 18, 1929, sailed on the SS Beringaria for Portugal, where he spent 18 months at the School of Tropical Medicine in Lisbon doing post-graduate studies. He then traveled to Galangue to a mission founded by Reverend Henry Curtis McDowell and his wife Bessie Fonvielle McDowell. McMillan and his wife arrived in 1931 as the first US medical missionaries in Portuguese West Africa. When the arrived, the hospital was nothing but a mud hut and had no beds, nurses, trained staff, or modern supplies.

On his first day he was immediately active, removing a goiter, performing cataract surgery, and removing a gangrenous finger. He generally worked in a suit and treated patients in a range of over 200 miles (320 km). Supplies were limited, and his first sterilizer was fashioned from a used oil drum and a tire-pressure gauge. Patients often paid in kind, giving chickens, eggs, corn, and vegetables for their care. While Willena had no formal medical training, she also worked in hospital and in particular supervised an infant care clinic. The couple spoke Portuguese and learned the local language of Umbundu, and they were very well liked and respected by the communities they served.

The couple remained in Angola for 17 years, returning only for a short period in 1935. While in the United States, the couple met white doctor Willis F. Pierce of Clarinda, Iowa, who promised a large donation in support of the hospital. This donation allowed the construction of a two-story brick building which was completed in 1938. Further donations by the Women's Association of the Middle Atlantic Conference of the Congregational and Christian Churches allowed the construction of a surgery unit. Over the years, the hospital's expansions covered 4 acres (1.6 ha) containing 45 buildings, the two-story brick hospital, 130 beds, up-to-date equipment (including a new sterilizer), a chapel dedicated to Aaron's father, Reverend Henry R. McMillan, and training facilities for medical and business staff. McMillan left Angola in 1948 and was shortly replaced by Robert A. McGowan as head of the hospital

== Return to Omaha ==
After his return, he constructed a hospital meant for people of all backgrounds that he dubbed "People's Hospital" on 20th and Grace in Omaha. People's Hospital closed after five years, and McMillan continued to work as a doctor in an office he had built for himself at that location. He was involved in the NAACP and served as chairman of the NAACP life membership committee in 1959. He also served on the Omaha Housing Authority Board from 1956 to 1967, and as chairman in 1964. Well respected in Omaha and throughout the country, he was often invited to speak about his experience. Along with his missionary experience and medicine in Africa, he spoke in favor of democracy, black history, and education, extolling the virtues of universal education, especially in Africa.

Willena also was active in civic affairs, serving for a time as board member of Uta Halee Girls Village and at one time heading the American Leprosy Mission for the Nebraska Council of Women. She died in 1970 in Omaha. Aaron died June 1, 1980, in Inglewood, California.

On October 26, 1967, he received a minor gunshot wound in Lincoln, Nebraska, but fully recovered. In 1969 he was tried for tax evasion based on irregularities in his tax returns between 1959 and 1962. He eventually pleaded no contest to the charge and received three years probation.

== Publications ==
- McMillan, Aaron M. "Through the Years in Medical Work in Africa", read before the sixth Annual Meeting of the Medical Association of the Protestant Missions of Angola, Quesua, June 1939, The Dondi Press

== See also ==
- Hospitals in Omaha, Nebraska

Preceded by John Andrew Singleton	Nebraska Legislature District 9; 1929-1930	Succeeded by Ralph W. Whited
