= Comfort Baker =

- Born: c. 1869; New Bern, North Carolina, U.S.
- Died: June 5, 1946; Phoenix, Arizona, U.S.
- Occupation: School Teacher

Comfort Baker (born c. 1869) was a teacher in the American South and was the first African American to graduate from a High School in Omaha, Nebraska.

Comfort was born in New Bern, North Carolina, about 1869. Her father died when she was very young. When she was 12 she moved to Raleigh, North Carolina, where her mother, named Catherine, died within a year. She moved to Omaha to live with her uncle, Andrew Hendricks, and his wife. She started studies at Omaha High School at the age of 15, and the same year Mr. Hendricks died and her aunt was confined to a mental institution.

In order to continue her studies, Comfort took a job as a domestic in the family of Watson B. Smith. Her final year in high school she left the Smith household and stayed with various Omaha African-American families. She graduated in 1889 after three years of high school study. After high school, Comfort intended to go to Memphis Normal School in Memphis, Tennessee, but ended up graduating in 1893 from Fisk University, a historically black university in Nashville, Tennessee. Her college fees were paid by Omaha High School teacher, Belle H. Lewis.

Her first job was to teach a summer school at Newport, Arkansas, to be followed by a position as principal of an African American school. She was well respected in Omaha and contributed writings to the newspaper, The Enterprise edited by Thomas P. Mahammitt and working with his wife, Ella Mahammitt. In 1896, she taught at Corsicana, Texas. In 1905, she was teaching in Gainesville, Texas.

Comfort died on June 5, 1946, in Phoenix, Arizona. Her obituary noted that she had been the first principal of the Phoenix Colored High School and had been a school teacher for more than 50 years, 21 of those years in Phoenix, up until her 1940 retirement.
