= Jacob Moorer =

South Carolina lawyer and civil rights activist

- Born: April , 1863; Orangeburg County, South Carolina, U.S.
- Died: February 27, 1935 (aged 71); Orangeburg, South Carolina, U.S.
- Education: Claflin University
- Occupations: Lawyer, Civil Rights Activist
- Spouse: Lizelia Augusta Jenkins Moorer

Jacob Moorer (April 1863 – February 27, 1935) was a South Carolina African-American lawyer and civil rights activist. He frequently fought cases in opposition to the elector provisions of the 1895 South Carolina Constitution, which he viewed as disenfranchising blacks. His most famous case was Franklin v. South Carolina, a murder case involving black sharecropper Pink Franklin which he and John Adams, Sr. appealed to the United States Supreme Court.

== Life ==
Moorer was born during the Civil War in Orangeburg County, South Carolina to Wilson and Hazel Moorer. He learned to read and write by age 8, and worked on his father's farm. He graduated from the college of the Normal School at Claflin University in 1892 and was admitted to the bar in 1896. Education was very important to him, before passing the bar he was principal of LaGrange Academy in Georgia and he believed in universal education. In 1898 in a debate society, he argued in the negative on the question, "Does the present system of education among the colored people create a supply for which there is no demand?" He was one of few black lawyers in the area, it was reported in 1905 that he was the only black at the Orangeburg bar. He was noted for his formal dress, which was remarkable in the summer South Carolina heat. In 1899, he married renowned black poet, Lizelia Augusta Jenkins Moorer; they had no children.

== Politics ==
Around that time, Moorer became involved with politics. He was a candidate for the state legislature for the Union Republican party in 1896. He was secretary of the organizing committee of the Orangeburg Colored Fair in December 1896 and was a Census Enumerator in 1900.

He continued to be very active in the Orangeburg County Republican Party throughout his life. He was a congressional delegate for Orangeburg County to the Republican Convention for the Seventh Congressional District in 1900 and was elected secretary of the convention in 1902. and again in 1908.

== Legal career ==
=== Electoral challenges ===
In 1898, Moorer played a role he frequently repeated throughout his career, championing the electoral and civil rights of African-Americans. He argued on behalf of James H. Weston against the tabulation of votes for Congress in the election of J. William Stokes in 1898 for a seat in the House. In the official tabulation, Stokes received 1,456 votes and Weston 81. Moorer objected that the election and registration laws were unconstitutional, and his objection was overturned, an argument and outcome he repeated many times. In 1902, he contested the election of Congressman Asbury Francis Lever on behalf of Alexander D. Dantzler - not the first time Dantzler had been contested his loss. In 1904, he contested congressional election of Lever on behalf of Minister C. C. Jacobs, and in 1905 he represented Isaac Meyers contesting the election of James O'H. Patterson and again represented Jacobs in 1905 contesting Lever's re-election.

In 1906 he went to Washington, DC and spoke before the House Committee on Elections in support of Isaac Meyers contest of the election of J. O. Patterson. The State, a Columbia, SC newspaper, reported that Moorer was not taken seriously and his manners brought many laughs from the congressmen. The New York Times reported that the house committee noted that if they granted Moorer's claim, there would "have to unseat every member in the House from a Southern state". In 1906, he again contested on behalf of Dantzler against the victory of Lever. This contest was another landslide; Lever received 1,979 votes and Dantzler 83. In 1908, he contested the election of Lever against R. H. Richardson. In 1912, he contested George S. Legare's victory in the House, representing Aaron Prioleau.

=== Criminal cases ===
Moorer was also frequently employed as a defense attorney. In the late 1900s, he worked with John Adams, Sr, another black lawyer. In 1908, Adams and Moorer defended Handy Gloster who was convicted of the murder of a representative of his landlord, Nathan Garrick who attacked Gloster with a pistol in front of the Constable, but who ended up dead.

In 1915, Moorer and Nathaniel J. Frederick represented Bogus Sanders in a murder trial in Columbia. Sanders was found guilty by the all-white jury, but the conviction was thrown out on appeal by the State appellate court due to an admission by a juror that he was prejudiced against black lawyers.

=== Pink Franklin ===
In 1907–1910, Adams and Moorer served as the defence for Pink Franklin in a case that went to the Supreme Court. Franklin killed a white constable who came to his house to arrest him. Moorer and Adams challenged the racial composition of the grand and petit juries and the constitutionality of South Carolina's 1895 Constitution. They lost his case at all levels, and this case was the second time black South Carolina lawyers had appeared before the Supreme Court. The case received national attention and finally in 1919, Franklin sentence was commuted and he was released on parole due to the continued efforts of Moorer and Adams, but also the efforts of Booker T. Washington, Oswald Garrison Villard, Joel Elias Spingarn, Frances Blascoer, Bernard Hagood, and Claude Sawyer. Between 1906 and 1926, Moorer was in seven criminal and 14 civil cases before the South Carolina Supreme Court, winning one criminal and four civil appeals. He practiced in Orangeburg as late as 1932 and died in 1935.
