= Lizelia Augusta Jenkins Moorer =

American poet (1868–1936)

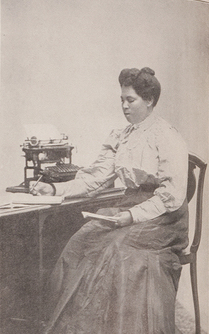
- Born: September , 1868; Pickens, South Carolina, U.S.
- Died: May 24, 1936 (aged 67); Orangeburg, South Carolina, U.S.
- Occupations: Poet; teacher; civil rights activist
- Spouse: Jacob Moorer

Lizelia Augusta Jenkins Moorer (September 1868 - May 24, 1936) was an African-American poet and teacher in Orangeburg, South Carolina.

== Early life ==
Moorer was born in September 1868, in Pickens, South Carolina. Her parents were Warren D. Jenkins and Mattie Miller.

She taught at the Normal and Grammar Schools, Claflin University, Orangeburg, South Carolina from 1895 to 1899.

== Career ==
In 1907, she published a collection of poems, Prejudice Unveiled and Other Poems. English Professor Joan R. Sherman described Moorer's poems as the "best poems on racial issues written by any black woman until the middle of the century." Moorer attacks "lynching, debt peonage, white rape, Jim Crow segregation, and the hypocrisy of the church and the white press".

Jenkins was also a very strong activist. Beyond her poetry, she was active in the Woman's Christian Temperance Union (WCTU), serving as State Vice-president in South Carolina in 1910. In 1924, she attended the 1924 Methodist Episcopal Church General Conference where she gave a speech arguing that women should be allowed to be ordained within the Methodist Church. During that conference, women were, indeed, given the right to be ordained as local deacons and elders.

== Personal life ==
In 1899, she married Jacob Moorer, an attorney in Orangeburg who frequently saw cases defending the rights of blacks against what he saw as a prejudiced legal system in South Carolina. In particular, he fought against the constitutionality of election law in the 1895 South Carolina Constitution.

== Selected works ==
- Moorer, Lizelia Augusta Jenkins. Prejudice unveiled : and other poems, Boston: Roxburgh Publishing Company, 1907 (text, via umich.edu)
