= Bedford, Missouri =

Unincorporated community in Missouri, U.S.

Coordinates: 39°41′46″N 93°22′23″W

Bedford is an unincorporated community in eastern Livingston County, in the U.S. state of Missouri.

The community is on Missouri Route J four miles northeast of Avalon. The Grand River flows past the north side of the community and the Fountain Grove Conservation Area is two miles east.

== History ==
Bedford was laid out in 1839. A post office called Bedford was established in 1858, and remained in operation until 1931.
