= Ella Mahammitt =

American journalist (1863–1932)

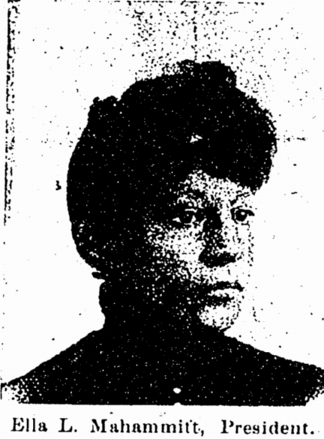
- Photo from the Enterprise, April 4, 1896
- Born: Ella Lillian Davis; 22 November 1863; Kansas City, Missouri, U.S.
- Died: 9 September 1932 (aged 68); Los Angeles, California, U.S.
- Resting place: Evergreen Cemetery (Los Angeles)
- Occupations: Journalist, nurse, civil rights activist
- Spouse: Dr. John M. Browne (m. 1884; div. 1890) Thomas P. Mahammitt (m. 1891; div. 1903) Alonzo R. Cassells (m. 1904; died 1910)

Ella Lillian Davis Browne Mahammitt (November 22, 1863 – September 9, 1932) was an American journalist, civil rights activist, and women's rights activist from Omaha, Nebraska. She was editor of the black weekly newspaper The Enterprise, president of Omaha's Colored Women's Club, and an officer of local branches of the Afro-American League. In 1895, she was vice-president of the National Federation of Afro-American Women, headed by Margaret James Murray, and in 1896 was a committee member of the successor organization, the National Association of Colored Women, under president Mary Church Terrell.

== Life ==
Ella Lillian Davis was born November 22, 1863, in Kansas City, Missouri, the only surviving child of William F. Davis, a Kansas City policeman and his wife Annie (Atchus) Davis. Ella L. Davis became a schoolteacher in Kansas City On June 18. 1884, she married Dr. John M. Browne in Kansas City, but it appears that the marriage was short-lived.

On June 9, 1891, Browne married Thomas P. Mahammitt of Omaha. The marriage took place in Kansas City on June 9, 1891, with a reception held in Omaha at the home of Millard F. Singleton. After their marriage, Browne and Mahammitt moved to Omaha.

== National Federation of Afro-American Women ==
In 1895, Mahammitt traveled to The First National Conference of the Colored Women of America held on August 26, 1895, in Berkeley Hall, Boston, Massachusetts on July 29–31, 1895, called by the Woman's Era Club of Boston. The focus of the convention was the education of black children and the group named themselves the National Federation of Afro-American Women. She was elected as vice-president representing the West at the meeting.

== The Enterprise ==
When Mahammitt returned to Omaha, she reported on the convention in the weekly "Woman's Column" in Omaha's weekly black paper, The Enterprise, which was owned by her husband but which she took a primary role in running and editing.

In Omaha, Mahammit was president of a branch of the Colored Women's Club, which operated under the motto, "Lifting as we Climb." In 1895, the club discussed and approved of the 1895 Atlanta Compromise speech by Booker T. Washington, which they read along with personal letters from Washington and his wife.

In December, 1895, Mahammitt attended the Congress of Colored Women in Atlanta as a part of the 1895 Atlanta Convention along with Mrs. Nellie Wingo of Lincoln, Miss Charlina Haynes of Beatrice, Mrs. Lulu B. Moors of Lincoln, and Mrs. Laura M. Craig of Omaha. Mahammit served as Nebraska State Commissioner to the congress. She presented at the Executive Session on December 28 on the topic of "A Mother's Duty in her Home". Others presenting in that session were Mrs. Lucy Thurman, Mrs. Libbie C. Anthony, Mrs. W. E. Matthews, Mrs. N. F. Morrell, Mrs. A. S. Gray, Mrs. C. S. Smith, and Mrs. J. Silone Yates. Others who spoke over the three-day congress were: Mrs. Lucy B. Stephens, Mrs. Ida D. Bailey, Mrs. Fannie Barrier Williams, Miss Ednorah Nahar, Mrs. Alice D. Cary, Mrs. Jessie Lawson, and Mrs. Fannie Barrier Williams. Mrs. Sylvanie F. Williams also presented on Mahammitt's topic during the session at the congress, and Mahammitt's contribution was read by Mrs. Jessie Lawson.

Mahammit was also active in the Nebraska branch of the Afro-American League where Samuel Grant was chairman. Mahammitt served as chair of the committee on enfranchisement of women at a meeting in Falls City in June 1896, Other officers of the League of Omaha included M. L. Wilson, J. W. Long, M. F. Singleton, George F. Franklin, and John Albert Williams.

In her weekly Woman's Column, Mahammit discussed issues pertinent to African American life, household management, and the Omaha Branch of the Colored Women's Club. In 1896, Mahammitt was criticized by the Afro-American Sentinel of Omaha edited by Cyrus D. Bell for her political activity. Mahammitt and the Women's Club had sought the appointment of G. F. Franklin (Clara B. Franklin was a member of the Women's Club and G. F. Franklin was formerly the owner of The Enterprise) to the position of Inspector of Weights and Measures by the Mayor. Bell also accused Mahammitt of opposing the appointment of Miss Jessie Merriam to a clerkship in the office of Mr. Albyn Frank, which Mahammit denied. In 1896, the Women's Club officers were: President, Ella L. Mahammitt, Vice President: Nettie Johnson, Treasurer: Ophelia Clenlans, Secretary (Clenlans was on the executive board of the National Federation of Afro-American Women: Laura M. Craig, and Corresponding Secretary: Clara B. Franklin. For Easter, 1896, the Enterprise released a special edition which was widely commended and whose contributors included Ella L. Mahammitt, Mrs. E. E. Guy, J. A. Childs, Josephine Silone Yates, Mrs. E. Turner, Comfort Baker, Victoria Earle Matthews, and Margaret James Murray. She also contributed to many other journals, including the Monthly Review of Philadelphia edited by Charles Alexander.

== National Association of Colored Women ==
In her column, Mahammitt endorsed the union of the National Federation of Afro-American Women and the National League of Colored Women at the conference of the League in Washington on July 14–16, 1896, although her strongest support went to the Federation with which she was closely involved. Omaha Colored Women's Club Recording Secretary Mrs. S. Lilliam Coleman represented the Woman's Club of Omaha at the July 1896 meeting. The federation and league were, indeed, united and thereafter known as the National Association of Colored Women under president Mary Church Taylor and Margaret James Murray as chairman of the executive committee. Mahammitt served on the Ways and Means Committee.

== Later years ==
Ella and Thomas Mahammitt divorced in 1903. Thomas married Sarah Helen B. Toliver on May 25, 1904, in Des Moines, Iowa and remained in Omaha. On May 21, 1904, in Douglas, Arizona, Ella married Alonzo R. Cassells, an Ohio native who owned and operated a restaurant in Douglas.

The Cassells moved further west to Los Angeles, California, where Alonzo opened a barber shop and Ella worked as a trained nurse, a profession she would follow for most of the rest of her life. Sometime around 1910, the Cassells separated, and Ella moved to Huntington Beach, California where she lived until she died in Los Angeles on September 9, 1932. She is buried in Evergreen Memorial Park Cemetery in Los Angeles.
