= Walter J. Singleton =

American journalist and civil servant (1860–1933)

- Born: c. 1860; Virginia
- Died: July 1, 1933; Washington, D.C., U.S.
- Occupation(s): Journalist, Clerk

Walter J. Singleton was a significant African American journalist, civil rights advocate, and government clerk, particularly active during the late 19th and early 20th centuries. He was born around 1860 in Virginia and later moved to Omaha, Nebraska, where he made his mark as a journalist and editor for Omaha Progress, a prominent Black-owned newspaper. Singleton’s work focused on addressing racial and social issues of his time, giving a voice to African Americans and highlighting their struggles and achievements. His involvement in the Afro-American League, a forerunner to the NAACP, underscores his commitment to racial equality; through this organization, Singleton worked to promote the rights and welfare of African Americans.

After establishing his reputation in Nebraska, Singleton moved to Washington, D.C., where he took on roles within the Department of War. In addition to his clerical work, he actively participated in various intellectual and social clubs, including the Mu-So-Lit Club, a group representing the capital's musical, social, and literary professionals. He also contributed to initiatives aimed at dismantling racial segregation, including supporting legislation against Jim Crow laws. Singleton held leadership roles in community organizations like the Young Men's Protective League and the Banneker Relief Association, which provided financial support and burial assistance to impoverished African Americans. Until his death in 1933, Singleton remained a powerful advocate for African American rights, a respected public servant, and a vital figure in Washington, D.C.'s Black community.

== Life ==
Walter J. Singleton was born in Virginia near Washington, DC in about 1860. He married Minnie B. Green, daughter of Johnson Green and Mary Jane Bradshaw. In the 1880s, he moved with his brother, Millard F. Singleton, to Omaha, Nebraska. He died July 1, 1933.

== Career ==
=== Omaha ===
In Nebraska, he was active in state politics. He was associated with the states first black legislator, M. O. Rickets, and in 1890, he helped form a Nebraska branch of the Afro-American League in Omaha, where he was an officer He was an editor of the black paper, Omaha Progress founded by Ferdinand L. Barnett.

=== District of Columbia ===
In December 1898 he was appointed to the employ of the United States Department of the Treasury by Secretary of War and former congressman from Nebraska, George de Rue Meiklejohn, where he first served as a messenger. He transferred to a clerkship in the office of the Secretary of the War Department and then as a clerk in the Bureau of Insular Affairs in the War Department.

In 1908 he served as president of the Young Men's Protective League in Washington D.C. He presidency of the group was tumultuous, as he faced two legal battles during his first term. However, he was reelected in 1909.

In the 1910s he was an active member of the Washington DC Mu-So-Lit club, representing DCs Musical, Social, and Literary professionals . In 1917 he served as president of the group with first vice president Lafayette M. Hershaw and second vice president R. W. Thompson. He was also involved in the black branch of the Association of Oldest Inhabitants of the District of Columbia, serving on the board of directors in 1919.

Also in 1919, Singleton along with Henry Lassiter, L. M. Hershaw, Archibald Grimké, and Robert H. Terrell was a prime mover in the introduction by Congressman Martin B. Madden of a law (H.R. No. 376) to abolish the "Jim Crow" car. The Madden Amendment to the Esch–Cummins Act failed.

At the time of his death in 1933, he was president of the Banneker Relief Association, which provided financial support to poor members and assisted with burial fees, of which he had been an officer since the 1900s
