= Thomas P. Mahammitt =

American journalist

- Born: August , 1862; Frederick, Maryland, U.S.
- Died: March 28, 1950 (aged 87); Omaha, Nebraska, U.S.
- Occupations: Journalist, Civil Rights Activist
- Spouses: Ella Lillian Davis Browne (m. 1891–1903) Sarah Helen B. Toliver (m. 1904)

Thomas P. Mahammitt (August 1862 – March 28, 1950) was a journalist, caterer, civil rights activist, and civic leader from Omaha Nebraska. He was owner and editor for the black weekly, The Enterprise, Omaha's leading black paper at the turn of the 20th century. He was also an active leader in the Masons and the Boy Scouts and was named "Omaha's most distinguished Negro citizen" in 1934.

== Life ==
Mahammitt was born August, 1862 in Frederick, Maryland. Mahammitt worked as a waiter as a young man, and moved to Omaha in the 1880s where he continued to work as a caterer. In 1896, Mahammitt and Oscar R. Ricketts ran "Mahammitt & Ricketts, Billiard Hall and Pool Room, Bath Room and Tonsorial Parlor" at 1120 Capitol Avenue in Omaha.

He married Miss Ella Lillian Davis Browne of Kansas City in that city on June 9, 1891. A reception was held in Omaha at the home of Millard F. Singleton. They were separated at the time of her death in 1903. He later married Sarah Helen Bradley Toliver on May 25, 1904 in Des Moines, Iowa. She died November 26, 1956. Mahammitt died March 28, 1950. His funeral was at St. Philip's Episcopal Church and he was buried in Forest Lawn Cemetery.

== Omaha civic life and The Enterprise ==
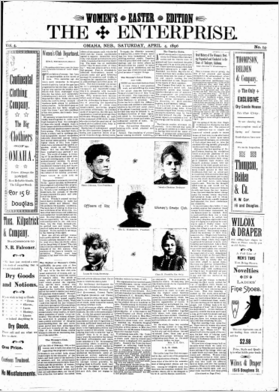
Cover of The Enterprise, April 4, 1896

In 1893 George F. Franklin started publishing The Enterprise, later published by Thomas P. Mahammitt. For Easter, 1896, Mahammitt's Enterprise released a special edition which was widely commended and whose contributors included Ella L. Mahammitt, Mrs. E. E. Guy, J. A. Childs, Josephine Sloan Yates, Mrs. E. Turner, Comfort Baker, Victoria Earle Matthews, and Margaret James Murray (wife of Booker T. Washington). The Enterprise was owned by Thomas and operated by his wife, Ella, with Mrs. Al. Robinson the typographer, and was Omaha's leading black paper in the 1890s and 1900s. Its success allowed it to increase in size from a seven-column folio to a six-column quatro in 1901. Mahammitt was on the executive committee of the Western Negro Press Association along with chairman W. W. Taylor and with H. R. Pinkney, Col. F. L. Jeltz, Nick Chiles, and W. H. Duncan and of the National Afro-American Press Association in 1905.

Mahammitt was involved in civic affairs as well. In 1896, he was on the executive board of the Colored Men's Working Republican Club, and in 1897 he served as treasurer for the local board for the Negro Department of the Tennessee Centennial. He had a good relationship with Omaha's political elite, and in 1900 he became Omaha Inspector of Weights and Measures. Mahammitt was noted for his strict enforcement and made his office self-supporting, inspecting fees paying his salary.

In the early 1900s, Mahammitt and his wife were drawn into conflict with anti-Booker T. Washington black newspapers, such as Chicago's The Broad Ax and Topeka's Plaindealer. Much of the antipathy towards Mahammitt stemmed from his relationship with Omaha Mayor Moores, who appointed him inspector of weights and measures at a salary of about $1,600. Mahammitt's renewal appointment was initially rejected in 1903, but Mahammitt was eventually confirmed. In 1908, together with Nick Chiles of the Topeka Plaindealer and J. W. Jackson, Mahammitt visited President Theodore Roosevelt as the guest of William Tecumseh Vernon. After this visit, Mahammitt endorsed the secretary of war William Howard Taft, which increased the spats between his and other papers.

Mahammitt and The Enterprise frequently advocated civil rights and black empowerment. In 1906, Mahammitt was involved in a struggle with a city council candidate who wished to exclude the sale of certain property to blacks in Omaha. In 1907, Mahammitt advocated in The Enterprise the boycott of firms that refused to serve blacks.

== Masonry ==
Mohammit was very involved in Masonic activities, in the 1890s he was a member of the Damascus Temple of Mystic Shriners and later a member of the Imperial Grand Council, Ancient Arabic Order of Nobles of the Mystic Shrine of North and South America. He was Senior Grand Warden of the Grand Lodge of Missouri in 1903. Mahammitt's Masonic involvement led to a scandal when he, Joseph Carr, and Grand Master of Masons in Missouri Matthew O. Rickets were sued by James G. Jewell over Jewell's continued membership in Mahammitt's Excelsior Lodge, Number 110, A. F. & A. M.

== Boy Scouts ==
Mahammitt was a leader of Omaha Boy Scout Troop 79 starting in 1920 and was awarded the "Silver Beaver Award" in 1934, the first black to receive the award in the US. He first served three years as a troop committeeman before becoming a Scoutmaster. He served at Long School, and he retired as scoutmaster at age 80 in 1948.

== Later activities ==
In 1922, Mahammitt served on the executive committee of the Omaha Colored Commercial Club along with H. J. Pickett, Father John Albert Williams, Dr. L. E. Britt, Dr. Craig Morris, Nate Hunter, Dr. John Albert Singleton, James A. Clarke, Rev. Russel Taylor, W. G. Hanes, Dr. D. W. Gooden, Rev W. F. Botts, C. W. South, S. H Dorsey, and Alphonso Wilson.

In 1934, Mahammitt was voted Omaha's "most distinguished Negro citizen" for his civic activities, and in 1949, he was honored by the Omaha Urban League for his work on inter-racial co-operation.
