= Cleamon Moorer =

Entrepreneur, author, and scholar

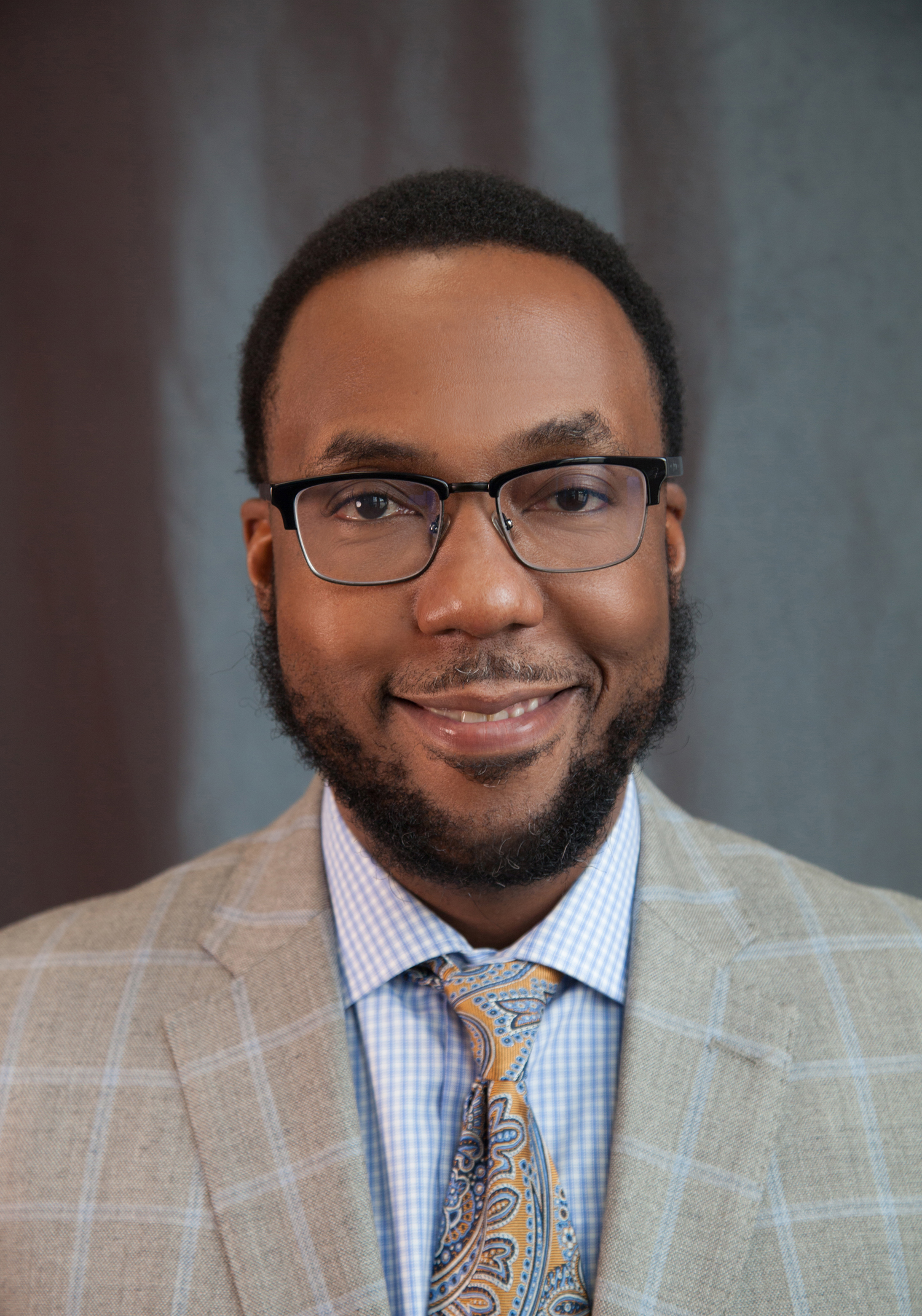
Cleamon Moorer in 2020

Cleamon Moorer is an American entrepreneur, author, and scholar. He founded Eye Care for Detroit.

== Early life and education ==
He lost vision in both eyes at age 21 due to congenital cataracts. A donation funded the surgery that restored his sight.

== Career ==
=== Academic ===
He has held the positions of dean of Madonna University School of Business and dean of Baker College's College of Business. He has also taught at Central Michigan University, Kettering University and Saginaw Valley State University. He has authored several academic articles and a self-published a memoir, "From Failure to Promise" in 2010.

=== Entrepreneurship ===
In 2019, Moorer and his spouse acquired American Advantage Home Care, a Michigan-based agency providing home health services. As president and CEO, he helped the company obtain Joint Commission accreditation and recognition, including a Comcast RISE award.

== Boards and recognition ==
Moorer has held board positions with Habitat for Humanity Detroit, and the Michigan HomeCare and Hospice Association.
