= John Adams Jr. (Nebraska politician) =

American politician

Member of the Nebraska Legislature from the 9th (Representatives, 1935), 5th (Unicameral, 1937-1941) district
- In office 1935–1941
- Preceded by: Johnny Owen
- Succeeded by: Dr. Harry Foster

Personal details
- Born: August 14, 1906 Columbia, South Carolina, U.S.
- Died: April 19, 1999 (aged 92)
- Party: Republican
- Spouse: Constance Singleton
- Education: University of Nebraska (AB, LLB)
- Occupation: Lawyer

Military service
- Allegiance: United States
- Branch/service: United States Army
- Years of service: 1943–46 (U.S. Army)
- Rank: Captain and Judge Advocate (US)
- Battles/wars: World War II

John Adams Jr. (August 14, 1906 – April 19, 1999) was an American lawyer and Republican politician and a member of the unicameral Nebraska Legislature. He was born in Columbia, South Carolina and lived in Omaha, Nebraska after 1923. He served in the last session of the Nebraska House of Representatives and was the only black member of the Nebraska unicameral's first session in 1937, where he served until 1941. He was named by the Omaha World Herald as one of the Legislature's 16 most able members. While a legislator, he introduced what became the states first public housing law and supported other welfare legislation. He also served as an honorary sergeant at arms at the 1936 Republican National Convention and as a Judge Advocate at Camp Knight in Oakland, California during World War II.

== Life ==
Adams was born August 14, 1906, in Columbia, South Carolina to the Reverend John Adams Sr. and Hattie (Bowman) Adams. Adams Sr. was an attorney and minister of the African Methodist Episcopal Church and served in the Unicameral after his son, from 1949 until he died in 1962. Adams attended Pueblo High School (class of 1923) in Pueblo, Colorado before the family moved to Nebraska in 1923 and Adams attended the University of Nebraska where he was one of 21 black students and the only black member of the Law School class of 1929 (he also received his undergraduate degree from UNL in 1927). Adams participated in junior boxing, for instance, coming in second in the middleweight class (160 pounds) to Joe Ban in April 1929 MidWestern AAU senior boxing championships. His brothers, Ralph W. and Harold S were also UNL alumni and Ralph W. was a graduate of the Law School and served as a lawyer in Omaha. Adams enlisted as an infantry officer in World War II in April 1932 and was promoted to Captain as trial judge advocate at Camp Knight in Oakland, California. Ralph and Harold also served in the war. He returned to California and specialized in real estate law. He continued to work for the Republican party in California, working with Ronald Reagan's gubernatorial election. Still, he said he voted for Jimmy Carter over Reagan for president.

== Law ==
Adams was initially a criminal lawyer and occasionally was involved in civil rights cases. In one case, he sued a restaurant that initially refused to serve him and his wife. When the police came and told the restaurant that the law required the restaurant to serve the Adams', the restaurant served a hamburger with an "inedible" amount of salt. The police initially told Adams that they didn't have civil rights complaint forms, so he had to type up his own. Eventually, the case went to court, and Judge Lester Palmer found the restaurant guilty and ordered a fine of $40. The complaint was and the fine rescinded when the restaurant agreed to change its policy. In another incident, Adams was arrested for refusing to move to the Jim Crow section in the balcony of a movie theater. When he arrived at the station, the Police Chief (Robert Samardick) released Adams and reprimanded the officer. Adams was also active in the National Association for the Advancement of Colored People. Later in life, he worked as a real estate lawyer. Adams was the first second-generation black lawyer in Nebraska and less than two years out of law school saw a case before the Nebraska Supreme Court.

== Politics ==
John Adams Jr.'s first campaign for the state legislature was in 1932 when he ran in the tenth district against Democrat Edward J Dugan (Adams received 1,402 votes against Dugan's 2,594 in a democratic landslide). In 1934 he won the election in the Ninth District Election against incumbent Democrat Johnny Owen and policeman Dan Phillips (1,308 votes to 1,207 and 1,183). He replaced Democrat Johnny Owen, who was first elected in 1933. Owen's Republican predecessor in the ninth was Republican John Andrew Singleton, a black dentist with whom Adams had previous political involvement, forming the Consolidated Negro Political Organization in March 1933. The organization was also included in its executive council, John O. Wood, Andrew Stuart, and Harry Anderson.

In 1936, Adams was opposed to the transformation of the Nebraska legislature to the unicameral form. He served in the 9th district of the House, a district bounded by Cumming Street, Pratt Street, 42nd Street, and the Missouri River. His new district, the fifth, in the Unicameral, was to be expanded north to Ames and Sprague Streets, increasing white voters' proportion. However, in the 1937 election, over 80 percent of his votes came from white voters, and he defeated white Democrat, Edgar D Thompson (7,313 votes to 6,681). In the election, he noted his opposition to sales and income taxes, his support for governor appointment over the election for judges, and support for unemployment insurance and educational financing. For the 1939 legislature, Adams Jr. defeated Dr. Harry Foster (5,808 votes to 5,632), campaigning against new taxes. Again for the 1941 legislature, Adams Jr. defeated Dr. Harry Foster (8,515 votes to 7,905), campaigning against new taxes and in support of various reforms to state and legislative processes. In the 1942 election, Adams lost to Foster (4,175 votes to 3,957) after having fought modernization of Douglas County office procedure.

Preceded by Johnny Owen	Nebraska Legislature District 9; 1935-1937	End of Bicameral Legislature

Beginning of Unicameral Legislature	Nebraska Legislature District 5; 1937-1941	Succeeded by Dr. Harry Foster
