= Ferdinand L. Barnett (Omaha) =

American politician

Member of the Nebraska Legislature from the 10th district
- In office 1927–1928
- Preceded by: Bernard R. Stone
- Succeeded by: M. J. Gardiner

Personal details
- Born: Ferdinand Lee Barnett; July , 1854 Huntsville, Alabama, U.S.
- Died: July 18, 1932 (aged 77–78) Omaha, Nebraska, US
- Party: Republican
- Spouse(s): Alice, Hattie Hunter
- Relatives: Alfred S. Barnett (brother)
- Education: Fisk University
- Occupation: Journalist, Civil servant

Ferdinand Lee Barnett (July 1854 – July 18, 1932) was a journalist, civil rights activist, politician, and civil servant from Omaha, Nebraska. He was founder and editor of the newspaper The Progressive, which ran from 1889 to 1906 and served for a time as deputy clerk in the county court. He was elected to the Nebraska State House of Representatives in 1926.

== Life ==
Ferdinand Lee Barnett was born in July 1854, in Huntsville, Alabama, to F. L. Barnett and Sarah Erskine. He attended Rusk School in Huntsville and Fisk University in Nashville. He moved to Omaha in the 1880s along with his brother, fellow activist and journalist Alfred S. Barnett. Alfred S. later moved to Des Moines and then Chicago, while Ferdinand stayed in Omaha until his death from heart disease on July 18, 1932. Services were at St. John African Methodist Episcopal Church and Barnett is buried at Forest Lawn Cemetery. Ferdinand first married a woman named Alice and second, on October 7, 1925, to Hattie Watts (née Hunter) of Sparta, Illinois, daughter of Shed Hunter and Maria Patterson.

Barnett had no children and was a cousin to Ferdinand Lee Barnett, husband of Ida B. Wells-Barnett.

== The Progress and early career ==
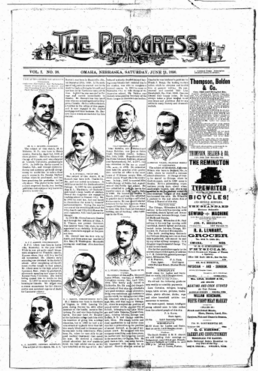
Cover page of The Progress, June 21, 1890

Barnett was active in the Omaha black community even before founding his paper, The Progress. In 1895, Barnett was a member of the Omaha branch of the National Afro-American League, serving in the Press committee with George F. Franklin, and in 1896 he was an alternate delegate to the Republican National Convention. In 1897 he was appointed sidewalk inspector in Omaha, a prestigious public position.

In 1889 he founded The Progress, Omaha's first black paper. His influence through the paper was both local and national, and in 1901, he was elected vice president of the Western Negro Press Association. The paper ran until 1906, and that same year he served as deputy clerk of the county court under Judge Irving Baxter and ran for city alderman. In the paper he worked with James Bryant.

Two other important African-American papers started about the same time. In 1892 or 1893, Democrat Cyrus D. Bell established the Afro-American Sentinel and in 1893, fellow Republican G. F. Franklin began publishing the Enterprise (later owned and edited by John Albert Williams). The Progress was noted in its pro-Republican stance, and the three papers became rivals. An example of their differences occurred in 1895 in the wake of Booker T. Washington's Atlanta Compromise Speech. Barnett's Progress opposed any sort of compromise, Franklin's Enterprise supported Washington's leadership in making a compromise, while Bell's Sentinel strongly endorsed Washington's position.

== Legislature and later career ==
In May 1921, Barnett was appointed custodian of the old and new police station by Commissioner Henry Dunn, succeeding George Hockley. He later moved to the job of janitor of the county jail.

Barnett ran for state senator of the tenth district in 1924 He lost in 1924, but ran again in 1926 and won. His campaign was a bare bones affair. He said, "I just hustled, I didn't spend a dime, or make a speech. I just went from house to house and told people to vote for me." He also used campaign cards from his 1924 campaign with the date changed He gained 1,076 votes against fellow Republican C. D. Bogue, who received 130 votes, and Democrat Ralph E. Roche, 935 votes. The first measure introduced by Barnet sought to make any county where mob violence or lynching occurred liable for damage to the victim or his heirs, a measure that passed. Along with John Andrew Singleton, he was one of two black men elected to the Nebraska House of Representatives in 1926.

Barnett's primary reelection in 1928 was a close affair. He won the primary over Sam Klaver by two votes and he lost in the general to M. J. Gardiner. In the 1930 primary, the votes were initially calculated to be a tie with Ed L. A. Smith with 243 votes each. Smith won a coin toss, but a recount was declared. After the recount, Barnett was given 238 votes and Smith 240. Barnett challenged the decision in court.

In 1931, a year before he died, Barnett was removed from his position as janitor by the Police Commissioner.

His name is sometimes misspelled as T. L. Barnett, likely due to a transcription error in the Negro Year Book.
