= Frances Blascoer =

American business manager (1873–1938)

Executive Secretary of the NAACP
- In office 1910–1911
- Preceded by: Position established
- Succeeded by: Mary White Ovington

Personal details
- Born: 1873 Marshall, Wisconsin, U.S.
- Died: 1938 (aged 64–65) New York City, New York, U.S.

Frances Blascoer was an American business manager. She was the NAACP's first Executive Secretary. She served in 1910–1911. Frances Helen Blascoer (1873-1938) born to Samuel and Julia Blascoer in Marshall, Wisconsin. She lived in China from 1917 to 1922 and later was an antique dealer in New York. She spent the final years of her life in the Creedmoor Division of the Brooklyn State Hospital.

== NAACP ==
Frances Blascoer was the NAACP's first Executive Secretary, serving February 1910–March 1911, resigning after a dispute with W. E. B. Du Bois, then the NAACP's Director of Publicity and Research, over finances for The Crisis, the NAACP monthly magazine that he edited.

== Career other than NAACP ==
Frances Blascoer was a settlement worker, in 1912 was Special Investigator for the Board of Trustees of the Ka'iolani Home for Young Women and Girls, and, in 1915, was Special Investigator for the Committee on Hygiene of School Children of the Public Education Association of the City of New York.

== Author ==
Frances Blascoer authored several works:

- The Unofficial Work of the Educational Alliance, in Jewish Charity, vol. III, no. 7, pp. 159–161, Apr., 1904 (article)
- Colored School Children in New York
- The Industrial Condition of Women and Girls in Honolulu
