= Matthew Ricketts =

American politician

Matthew O. Ricketts
- Phototype from the Progress, June 21, 1890

Member of the Nebraska House of Representatives
- In office 1893–1897

Personal details
- Born: Matthew Oliver Ricketts; April 3, 1858 Henry County, Kentucky, U.S.
- Died: January 15, 1917 (aged 58) St. Joseph, Missouri, U.S.
- Party: Republican
- Spouse: Alice Nelson
- Education: Omaha Medical College
- Occupation: Physician

Matthew Oliver Ricketts (April 3, 1858 – January 3, 1917) was an American politician and physician. He was the first African-American member of the Nebraska Legislature, where he served two terms in the Nebraska House of Representatives (the lower house of what was then a bicameral legislature) from 1893 until 1897. He was also the first African American to graduate from the University of Nebraska College of Medicine in Omaha.

== Biography ==
=== Early years ===
Ricketts was born to enslaved parents in Henry County, Kentucky in 1858. His parents moved to Boonville, Missouri, after the American Civil War when he was a child, and he completed school there.

In 1876 Ricketts earned a degree from the Lincoln Institute (now Lincoln University of Missouri) in Jefferson City, Missouri. In 1880 he moved to Omaha, where he was admitted to the Omaha Medical College (now the University of Nebraska College of Medicine). He worked as a janitor to pay his tuition. In March 1884 Ricketts graduated with honors, and soon after opened a medical office in Omaha. He was the first African-American college graduate and the first African-American doctor in the state of Nebraska.

=== Career ===
Ricketts quickly earned a reputation for "being a very careful physician, as well as an exceedingly likable young man." With his education and energy, Ricketts became the acknowledged leader of Omaha's African-American community. He was a charismatic man and controversial speaker.

Following the failed candidacy of Nebraska's first Black candidate, Edwin R. Overall, in 1890, Ricketts was elected to the Nebraska House of Representatives in 1892 on the Republican ticket and became the state's first Black representative. Rickets served two terms, from 1893 to 1897. He was the first African American to serve in the Nebraska Legislature. Ricketts was regarded as one of the best orators there and was frequently called upon for his opinions.

Ricketts helped secure appointments for Black people in city and state government positions, for patronage was an important part of politics before the establishment of merit career civil service for such positions. He is credited with urging the city of Omaha to create an African-American fire company, which resulted in Omaha's first all-Black hose crew being formed in 1895. Ricketts was a member of the Black association the Prince Hal Masons, where he was elected Worshipful Master of Omaha Excelsior Lodge No. 110. The African-American Masons were one of many fraternal associations created by African Americans in communities nationwide in the late 19th century as they organized new cooperative ventures. Ricketts addressed the 1906 Grand Convocation of the Freemasons in Kansas City, Missouri.

In 1890, Ricketts petitioned for a writ of habeas corpus on behalf of a Black teenager named Till who was being unlawfully enslaved in Fillmore County, Nebraska a generation post-emancipation. With the aid of the Omaha Afro-American League, Ricketts and Silas Robbins, Nebraska's first Black attorney, were able to secure Till's freedom out of court.

Ricketts was active in the Nebraska Legislature, chairing several committees and temporarily chairing the body. He introduced a bill to legalize interracial marriages, which passed the Legislature only to be vetoed by Governor Silas A. Holcomb. He also introduced a bill to prohibit the denial of public services to African Americans. In 1893, Ricketts led a measure prohibiting race-based denial of services. He was also instrumental in the enactment of a bill that set an age of consent for marriage in Nebraska, relying on a petition of 500 African-American women in Omaha to carry it forward.

After leaving the Legislature, Ricketts was an unsuccessful candidate for a federal appointee position, chiefly because his appointment was opposed by a Nebraska congressman. Ricketts subsequently moved to St. Joseph, Missouri to continue his medical career in 1903. He practiced there for another 14 years and continued to play a prominent role in politics.

=== Personal life ===
On November 12, 1884, Ricketts married Alice Nelson in Omaha, and they had three children. Ricketts died in St. Joseph, Missouri on January 15, 1917, at the age of 64.

== See also ==
- African Americans in Omaha, Nebraska
- History of Omaha
- African American officeholders from the end of the Civil War until before 1900
