= Omaha, Nebraska =

Largest city in Nebraska, US

Omaha
- City
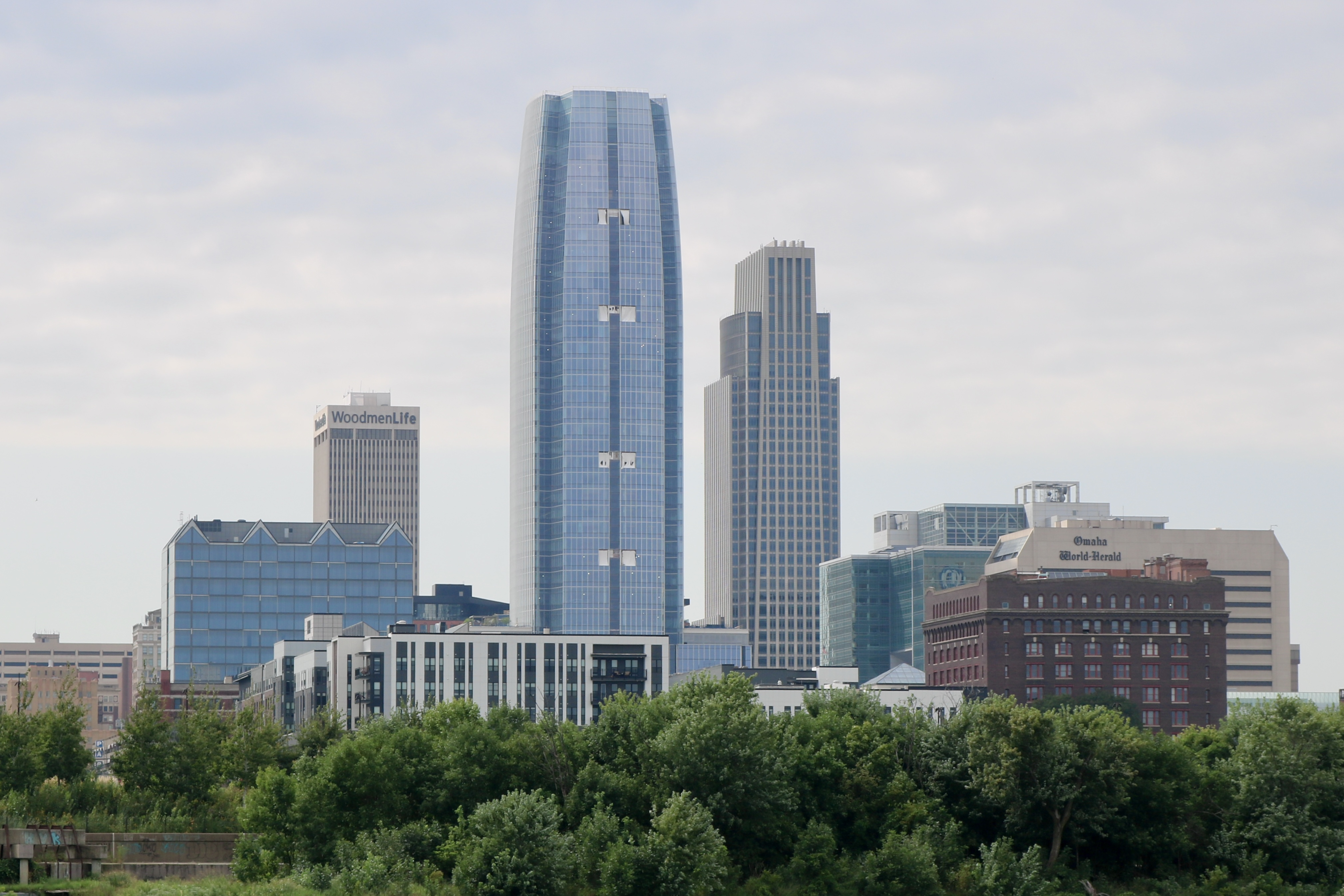
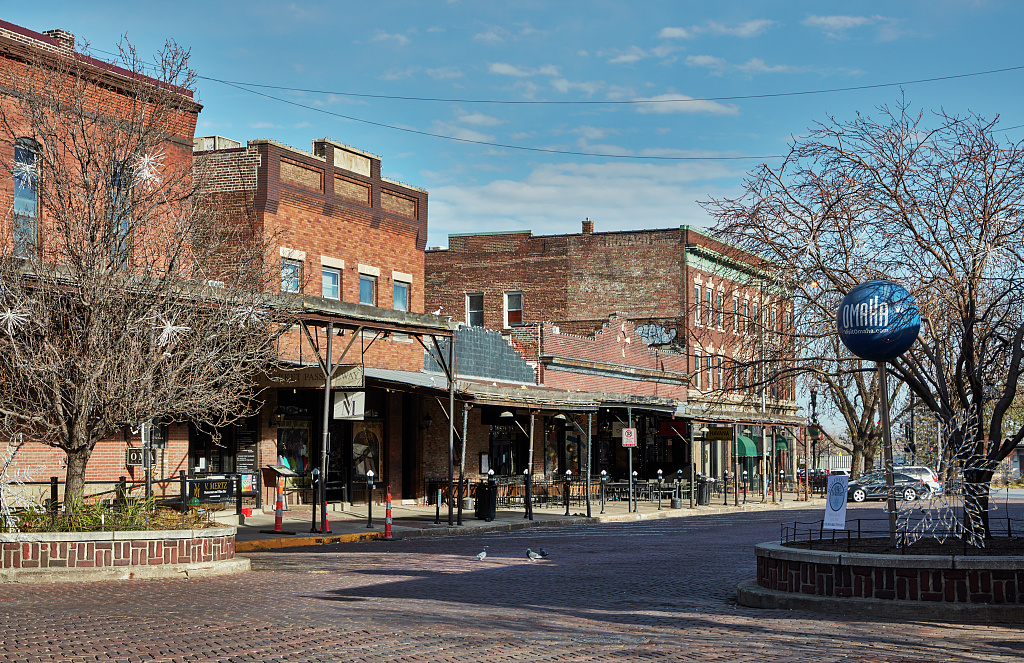
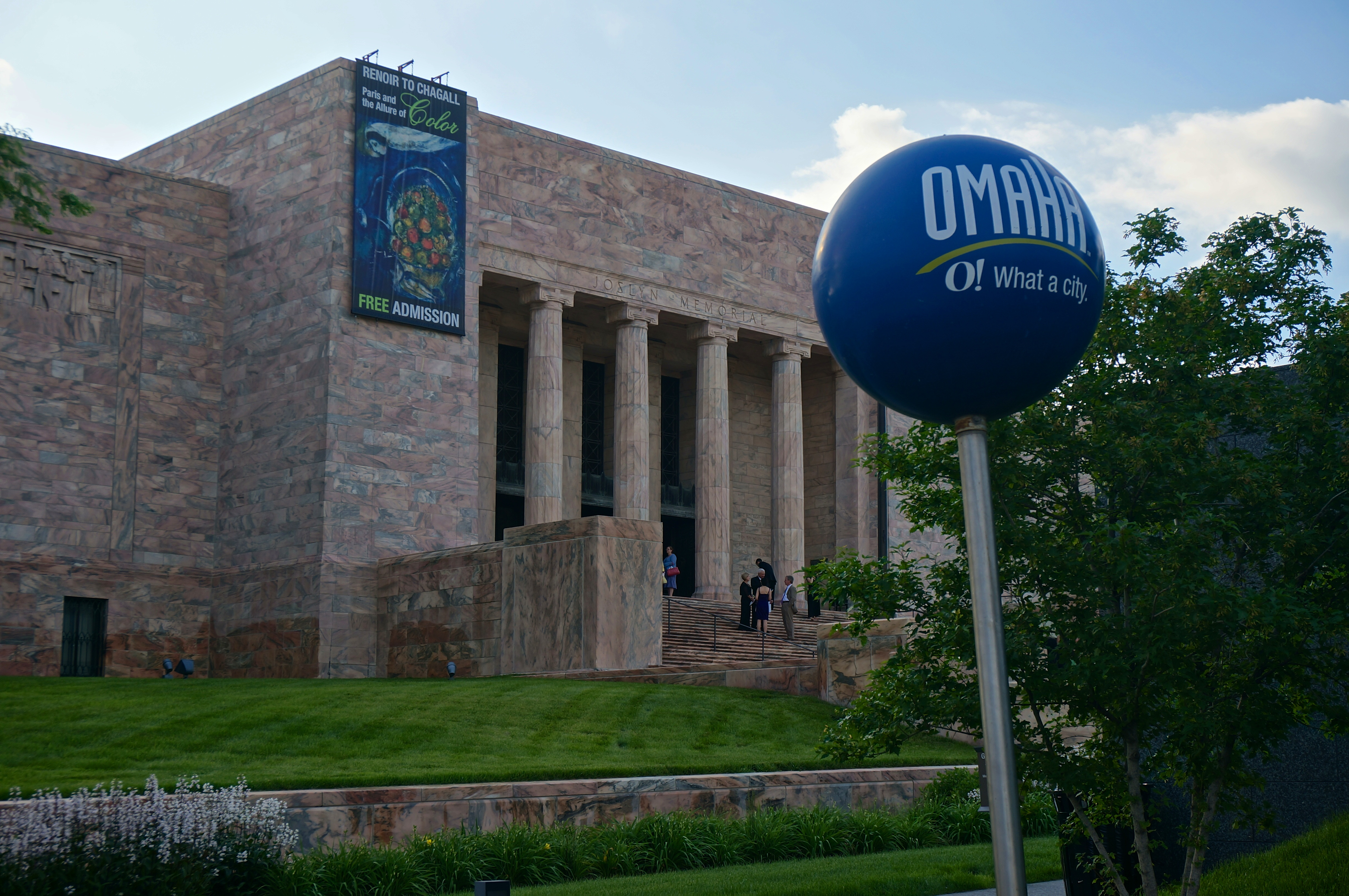
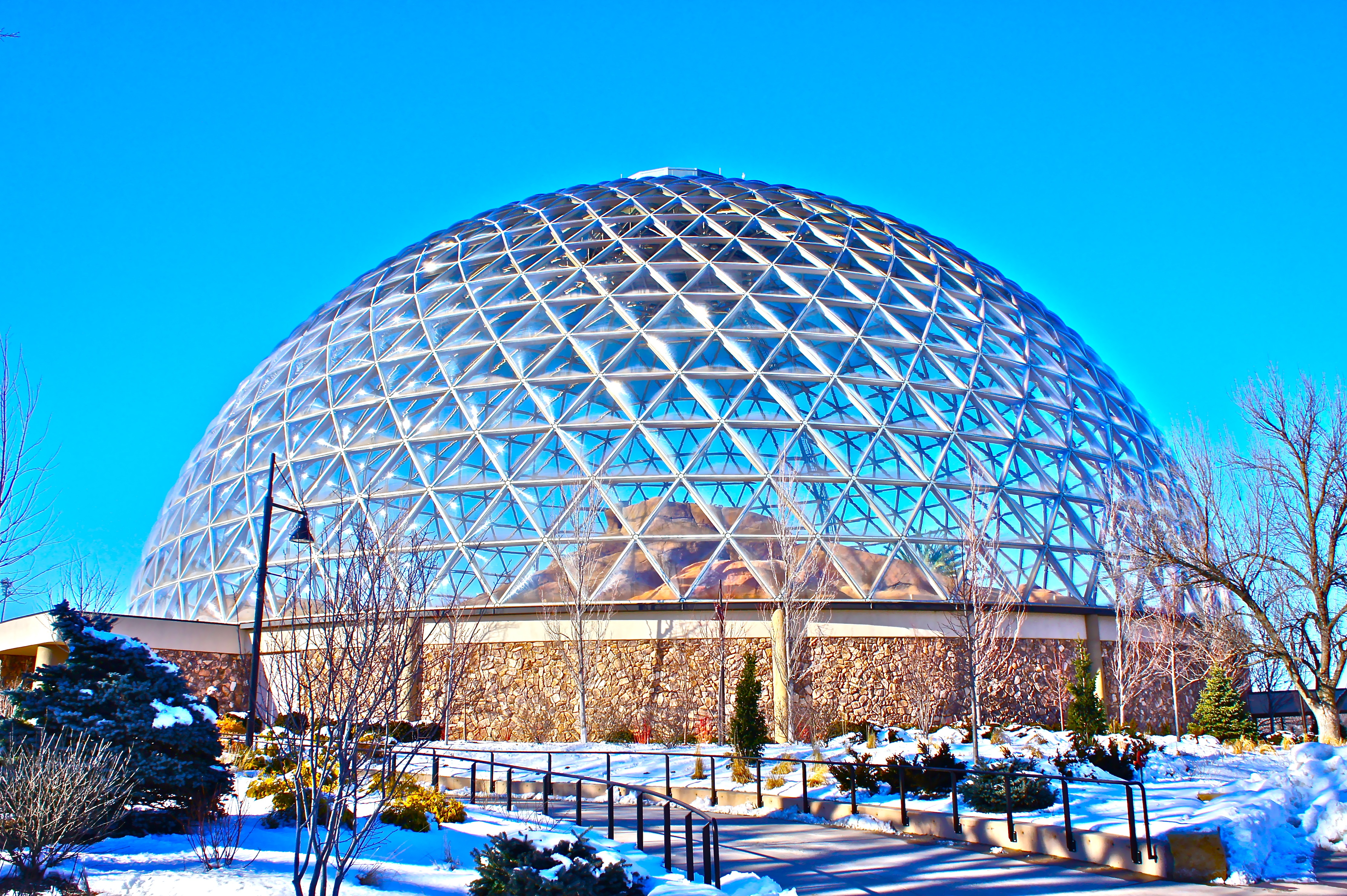
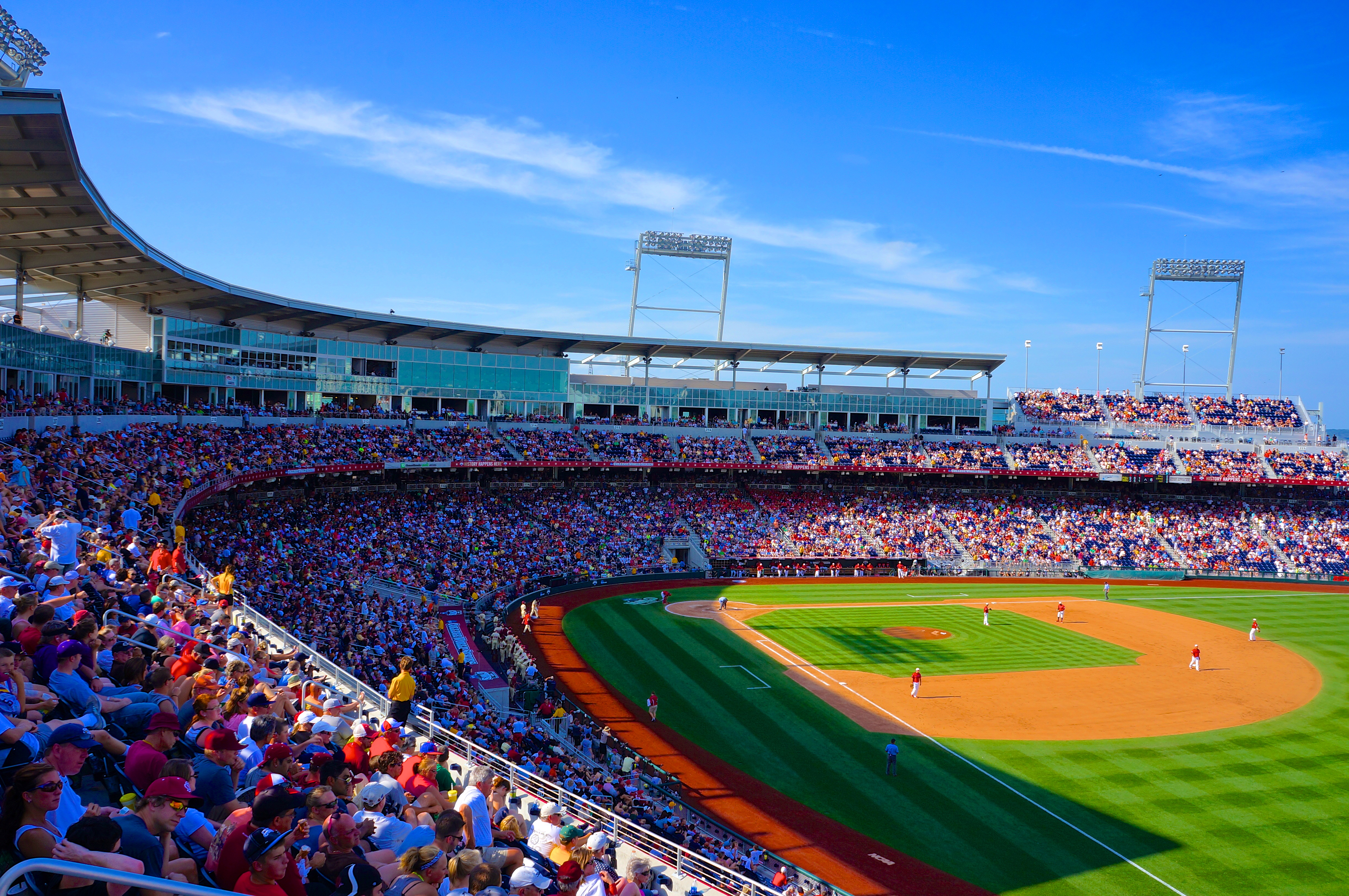
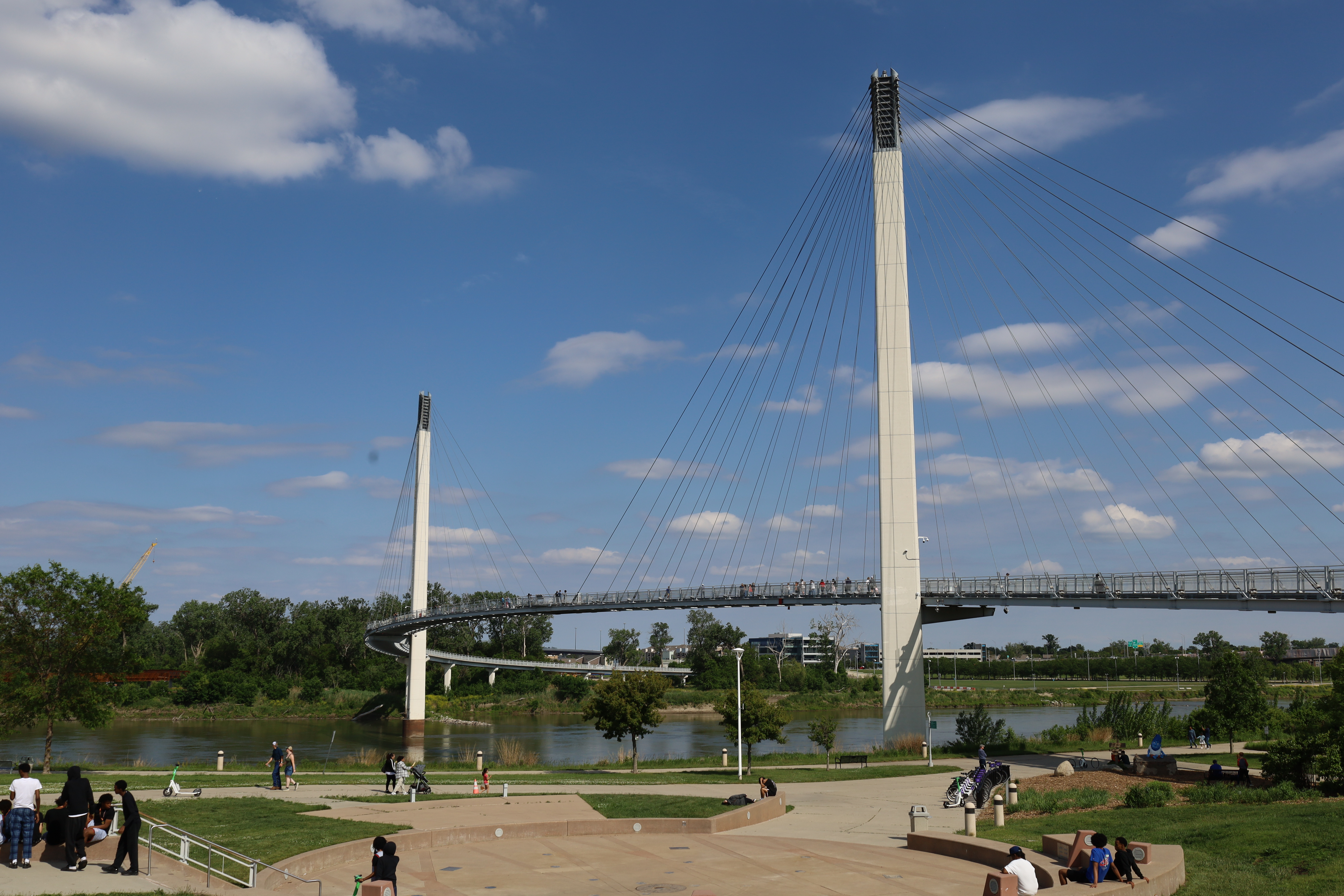
- Downtown Omaha Old Market Durham Museum Joslyn Art Museum Henry Doorly Zoo Charles Schwab Field Bob Kerrey Pedestrian Bridge

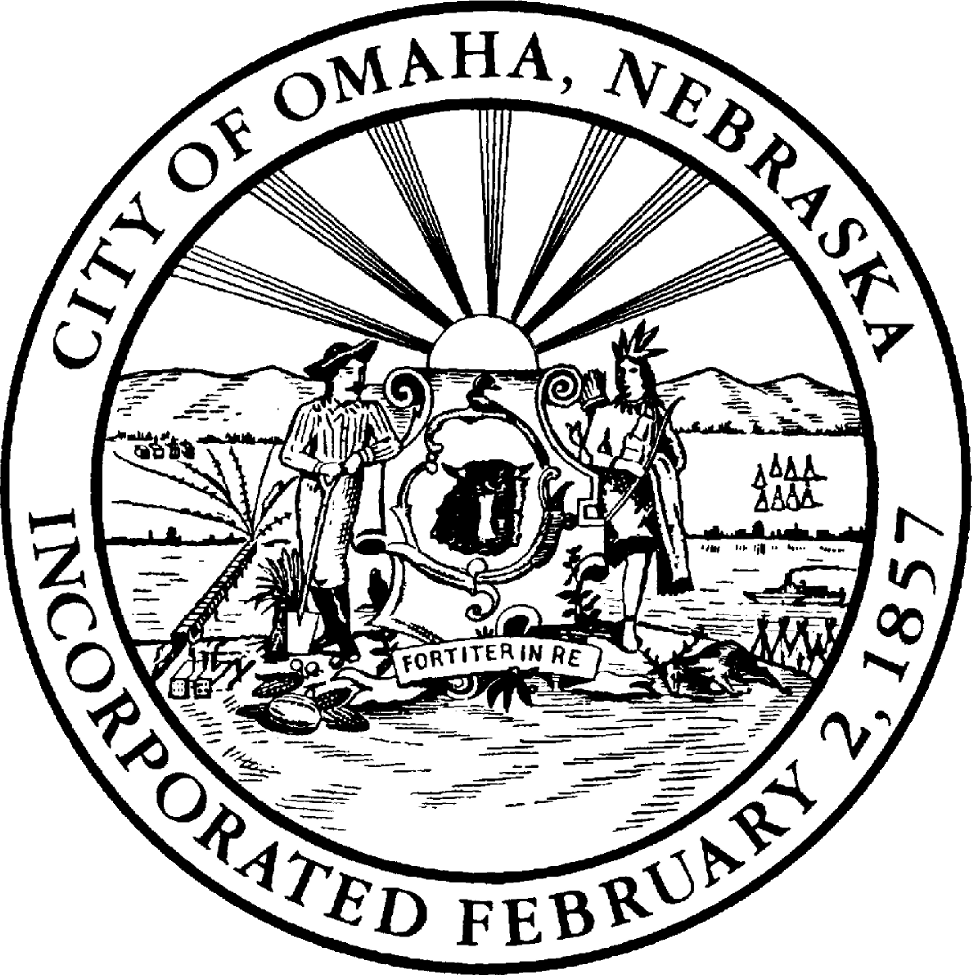
- Flag Seal
- Nicknames: Gate-city of the West, The Big O
- Motto: Fortiter in Re (Latin) (English: "Courageously in every enterprise")
- Interactive map of Omaha
- Location within Nebraska Location within the United States
- Coordinates: 41°15′31″N 95°56′15″W
- Country: United States
- State: Nebraska
- County: Douglas
- Founded: 1854; 172 years ago
- Incorporated: 1857; 169 years ago
- Named for: Omaha people

Government
  - Type: Strong mayor–council
  - Mayor: John Ewing Jr. (D)
  - City Clerk: Elizabeth Butler

Area
  - City: 146.27 sq mi (378.85 km^{2})
  - Land: 142.67 sq mi (369.51 km^{2})
  - Water: 3.61 sq mi (9.35 km^{2})
- Elevation: 1,060 ft (320 m)

Population (2020)
  - City: 486,051
  - Estimate (2025): 488,797 ▲
  - Rank: 42nd in the United States; 1st in Nebraska
  - Density: 3,407/sq mi (1,315.4/km^{2})
  - Urban: 819,508 (US: 55th)
  - Urban density: 3,026/sq mi (1,168.4/km^{2})
  - Metro: 1,009,836 (US: 55th)
- Demonym: Omahan

GDP
  - Metro: $92.357 billion (2023)
- Time zone: UTC−06:00 (CST)
  - Summer (DST): UTC−05:00 (CDT)
- ZIP Codes: 68101-68114, 68116-68119, 68122, 68124, 68127, 68130-68132, 68134-68139, 68142, 68144-68145, 68147, 68152, 68154, 68157, 68164, 68172, 68175-68176, 68178-68180, 68182-68183, 68197-68198
- Area code: 402 and 531
- FIPS code: 31-37000
- GNIS feature ID: 0835483
- Website: cityofomaha.org

Omaha (Note: Pronounced /ˈoʊməhɔː/ OH-mə-haw) is the most populous city in the U.S. state of Nebraska. It is located in the Midwestern United States along the Missouri River, about 10 mi (15 km) north of the mouth of the Platte River. Omaha had a population of 486,051 at the 2020 census, and with a 2025 population estimate of 488,797, it is the 42nd-most populous U.S. city. The eight-county Omaha–Council Bluffs metropolitan area extending into Iowa has approximately 1 million residents, the 55th-largest metropolitan area in the U.S. It is the county seat of Douglas County.

Omaha's pioneer period began in 1854, when the city was founded along the Missouri River by speculators from neighboring Council Bluffs, Iowa. It originally comprised a crossing called Lone Tree Ferry earning the city its nickname, the "Gateway to the West". Omaha introduced this new West to the world in 1898, when it played host to the World's Fair, dubbed the Trans-Mississippi Exposition. During the 19th century, Omaha's central location in the United States spurred the city to become an important national transportation hub. Throughout the rest of the 19th century, the transportation and jobbing sectors were important in the city, along with its railroads and breweries. In the 20th century, the Omaha Stockyards, once the world's largest, and its meatpacking plants gained international prominence.

Omaha is home to the headquarters of four Fortune 500 companies: Berkshire Hathaway, Kiewit Corporation, Mutual of Omaha, and Union Pacific Corporation. Other companies headquartered in the city include First National Bank of Omaha, Gallup, Inc., Green Plains, Intrado, Valmont Industries, Werner Enterprises, WoodmenLife, and three of the nation's ten largest architecture and engineering firms (DLR Group, HDR, Inc., and Leo A Daly). Notable cultural institutions include the Henry Doorly Zoo and Aquarium, Old Market, Durham Museum, Lauritzen Gardens, and the annual College World Series. Modern Omaha inventions include the Reuben sandwich; cake mix, developed by Duncan Hines; center-pivot irrigation; Raisin Bran; the first ski lift in the U.S.; the Top 40 radio format, which was first used in the U.S. at KOWH Radio; and the TV dinner.

== History ==
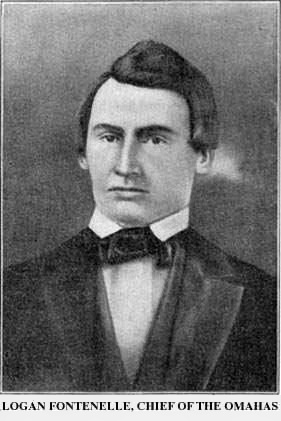
Logan Fontenelle, an interpreter for the Omaha Tribe when it ceded the land that became the city of Omaha to the U.S. government

Various Native American tribes had lived in the land that became Omaha since the 17th century, including the Omaha and Ponca, Dhegihan-Siouan language people who had originated in the lower Ohio River valley and migrated west by the early 17th century; Pawnee, Otoe, Missouria, and Iowa. The word Omaha (Omaha–Ponca: Umoⁿhoⁿ or Umaⁿhaⁿ) in the Omaha language means 'Upstream People' or 'Against the Current'.

In 1804 the Lewis and Clark Expedition passed the riverbanks where the city of Omaha would be built. Between July 30 and August 3, 1804, members of the expedition, including Meriwether Lewis and William Clark, met with Oto and Missouria tribal leaders at the Council Bluff at a point about 20 mi (32 km) north of present-day Omaha. Immediately south of that area, Americans built several fur trading outposts in succeeding years, including Fort Lisa in 1812; Fort Atkinson in 1819; Cabanné's Trading Post, built in 1822, and Fontenelle's Post in 1823, in what became Bellevue. There was fierce competition among fur traders until John Jacob Astor created the monopoly of the American Fur Company. The Mormons built a town called Cutler's Park in the area in 1846. While it was temporary, the settlement provided the basis for further development.

Through 26 separate treaties with the United States federal government, Native American tribes in Nebraska gradually ceded the lands that now make up the state. The treaty and cession involving the Omaha area occurred in 1854 when the Omaha Tribe ceded most of east-central Nebraska. Logan Fontenelle, an interpreter for the Omaha and signatory to the 1854 treaty, played an essential role in those proceedings.

=== Pioneer Omaha ===
Before it was legal to claim land in Indian Country, William D. Brown operated the Lone Tree Ferry that brought settlers from Council Bluffs, Iowa, to the area that became Omaha. Brown is generally credited as having the first vision for a city where Omaha now sits. The passage of the Kansas–Nebraska Act in 1854 was presaged by the staking out of claims around the area to become Omaha by residents from neighboring Council Bluffs. On July 4, 1854, the city was informally established at a picnic on Capital Hill, current site of Omaha Central High School. Soon after, the Omaha Claim Club was formed to provide vigilante justice for claim jumpers and others who infringed on the land of many of the city's founding fathers. Some of this land, which now wraps around Downtown Omaha, was later used to entice Nebraska Territorial legislators to an area called Scriptown. The Territorial capitol was in Omaha, but when Nebraska became a state in 1867, the capital was relocated to Lincoln, 53 mi (85 km) southwest of Omaha. The U.S. Supreme Court later ruled against numerous landowners whose violent actions were condemned in Baker v. Morton.

Many of Omaha's founding figures stayed at the Douglas House or the Cozzens House Hotel. Dodge Street was important early in the city's early commercial history; North 24th Street and South 24th Street also developed independently as business districts. Early pioneers were buried in Prospect Hill Cemetery and Cedar Hill Cemetery. Cedar Hill closed in the 1860s and its graves were moved to Prospect Hill, where pioneers were later joined by soldiers from Fort Omaha, African Americans and early European immigrants. There are several other historical cemeteries in Omaha, historical Jewish synagogues and historical Christian churches dating from the pioneer era, as well. Two sculpture parks, Pioneer Courage and Spirit of Nebraska's Wilderness and The Transcontinental Railroad, celebrate the city's pioneering history.

=== 19th century ===
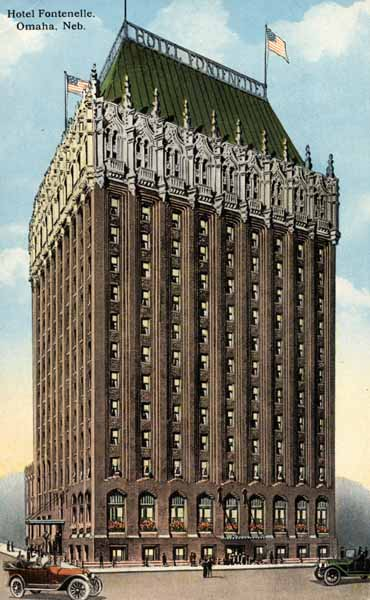
Hotel Fontenelle, formerly in downtown Omaha

The economy of Omaha boomed and busted through its early years. In 1858, the Omaha Daily Republican was founded by the Omaha Printing Company (rebranded Aradius Group, 2016), it was Nebraska's first regional newspaper–founded before Nebraska claimed statehood. Omaha was a stopping point for settlers and prospectors heading west, either overland or by the Missouri River. The steamboat Bertrand sank north of Omaha on its way to the goldfields in 1865. Its massive collection of artifacts is on display at the nearby Desoto National Wildlife Refuge. The jobbing and wholesaling district brought new jobs, followed by the railroads and the stockyards. Groundbreaking for the First transcontinental railroad in 1863, provided an essential developmental boom for the city. In 1862, the U.S. Congress allowed the Union Pacific Railroad to begin building westward railways; in January 1866 it commenced construction out of Omaha.

The Union Stockyards, another important part of the city's development, were founded in South Omaha in 1883. Within 20 years, Omaha had four of the five major meatpacking companies in the United States. By the 1950s, half the city's workforce was employed in meatpacking and processing. Meatpacking, jobbing and railroads were responsible for most of the growth in the city from the late 19th century through the early decades of the 20th century.

Immigrants soon created ethnic enclaves throughout the city, including Irish in Sheelytown in South Omaha; Germans in the Near North Side, joined by the European Jews and black migrants from the South; and Little Italy and Little Bohemia in South Omaha. Beginning in the late 19th century, Omaha's upper class lived in posh enclaves throughout the city, including the south and north Gold Coast neighborhoods, Bemis Park, Kountze Place, Field Club and throughout Midtown Omaha. They traveled the city's sprawling park system on boulevards designed by renowned landscape architect Horace Cleveland. The Omaha Horse Railway first carried passengers throughout the city, as did the later Omaha Cable Tramway Company and several similar companies. In 1888, the Omaha and Council Bluffs Railway and Bridge Company built the Douglas Street Bridge, the first pedestrian and wagon bridge between Omaha and Council Bluffs.

Gambling, drinking and prostitution were widespread in the 19th century, first rampant in the city's Burnt District and later in the Sporting District. Controlled by Omaha's political boss Tom Dennison by 1890, criminal elements enjoyed support from Omaha's "perpetual" mayor, "Cowboy Jim" Dahlman, nicknamed for his eight terms as mayor.

Calamities such as the Great Flood of 1881 did not slow down the city's violence. In 1882, the Camp Dump Strike pitted state militia against unionized strikers, drawing national attention to Omaha's labor troubles. The Governor of Nebraska had to call in U.S. Army troops from nearby Fort Omaha to protect strikebreakers for the Burlington Railroad, bringing along Gatling guns and a cannon for defense. When the event ended, one man was dead and several were wounded. In 1891, a mob hanged Joe Coe, an African-American porter after he was accused of raping a white girl. There were also several other riots and civil unrest events in Omaha during this period.

In 1898, Omaha's leaders, under the guidance of Gurdon Wattles, held the Trans-Mississippi and International Exposition, touted as a celebration of agricultural and industrial growth throughout the Midwest. The Indian Congress, which drew more than 500 American Indians from across the country, was held simultaneously. More than 2 million visitors attended these events at Kountze Park and the Omaha Driving Park in the Kountze Place neighborhood.

=== 20th century ===
==== To the 1960s ====
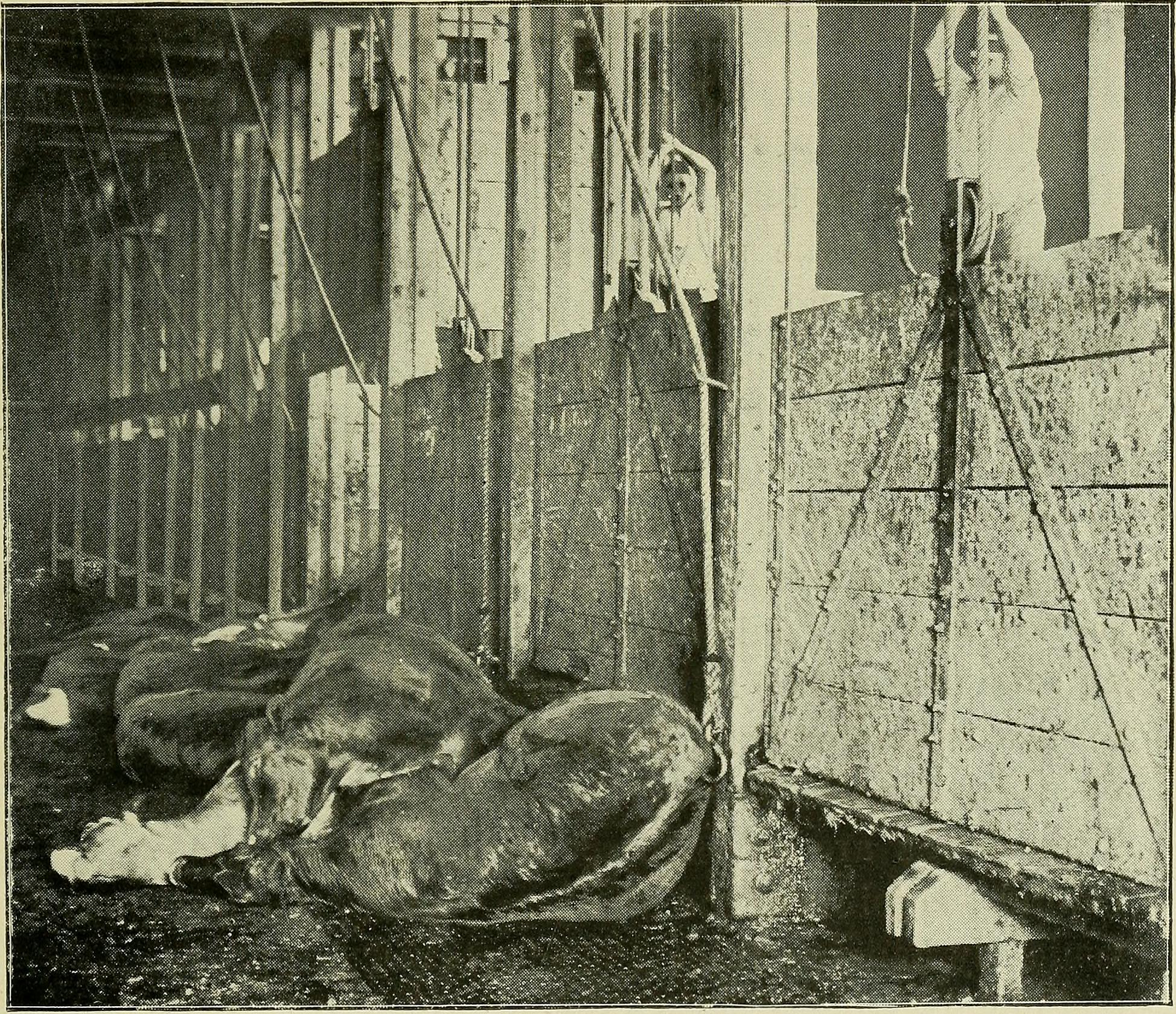
Men working at Omaha's Union Stockyards

With dramatically increasing population in the 20th century, competition and fierce labor struggles led to major civil unrest. In 1900, Omaha was the center of a national uproar over the kidnapping of Edward Cudahy, Jr., the son of a local meatpacking magnate. The city's labor and management clashed in bitter strikes, racial tension escalated as blacks were hired as strikebreakers, and ethnic strife broke out. A major riot by earlier immigrants in South Omaha destroyed the city's Greek Town in 1909, completely driving out the Greek population.

The civil rights movement in Omaha traces to 1912, when the first chapter of the National Association for the Advancement of Colored People west of the Mississippi River was founded in the city. The Omaha Easter Sunday Tornado of 1913 destroyed much of the city's African-American community, in addition to much of Midtown Omaha. During that year, future United States President Gerald R. Ford was born in Omaha. Today, there is a museum dedicated to his birthplace.

In 1919, the city was caught up in the Red Summer riots when thousands of whites marched from South Omaha to the courthouse to lynch a black worker, Willy Brown, a suspect in an alleged rape of a white woman. The mob burned the Douglas County Courthouse to get the prisoner, causing more than $1 million damage. They hanged and shot Will Brown, then burned his body. Troops were called in from Fort Omaha to quell the riot, prevent more crowds gathering in South Omaha, and to protect the black community in North Omaha. The riot is now known as the Omaha race riot of 1919.

The culture of North Omaha thrived throughout the 1920s through 1950s, with several creative figures, including Tillie Olsen, Wallace Thurman, Lloyd Hunter, and Anna Mae Winburn emerging from the vibrant Near North Side. Musicians created their own world in Omaha, and also joined national bands and groups that toured and appeared in the city.

After the tumultuous Great Depression of the 1930s, Omaha rebounded with the development of Offutt Air Force Base just south of the city. The Glenn L. Martin Company operated a factory there in the 1940s that produced 521 B-29 Superfortresses, including the Enola Gay and Bockscar used in the atomic bombing of Japan in World War II. The construction of Interstates 80, 480 and 680, along with the North Omaha Freeway, spurred development. There was also controversy, particularly in North Omaha, where new routes bisected several neighborhoods. Creighton University hosted the DePorres Club, an early civil rights group whose use of sit-in strategies for integration of public facilities predated the national movement.

Following the development of the Glenn L. Martin Company bomber manufacturing plant in Bellevue at the beginning of World War II, the relocation of the Strategic Air Command to the Omaha suburb in 1948 provided a major economic boost to the area.

Insurance boomed from the 1950s through the 1960s: more than 40 insurance companies were headquartered in Omaha, including Woodmen of the World and Mutual of Omaha. The city rivaled but never surpassed the United States insurance centers of Hartford, Connecticut, New York City, and Boston. After surpassing Chicago in meat processing by the late 1950s, Omaha suffered the loss of 10,000 jobs as both the railroad and meatpacking industries restructured. The city struggled for decades to shift its economy as workers suffered. Poverty became more entrenched among families who remained in North Omaha. In the 1960s, three major race riots along North 24th Street destroyed the Near North Side's economic base, with recovery slow for decades. In 1969, Woodmen Tower was completed and became Omaha's tallest building and first major skyscraper at 478 ft (146 m), a sign of renewal.

==== 1970s and onwards ====
Since the 1970s, Omaha has continued expanding and growing, mostly to available land to the west. West Omaha has become home to the majority of the city's population. North and South Omaha's populations continue to be centers of new immigrants, with economic and racial diversity. In 1975 a major tornado, along with a major blizzard, caused more than $100 million in damages in 1975 dollars.

Downtown Omaha has since been rejuvenated in numerous ways, starting with the development of Gene Leahy Mall and W. Dale Clark Library in the late 1970s. In the 1980s, Omaha's fruit warehouses were converted into a shopping area called the Old Market. The demolition of Jobber's Canyon in 1989 led to the creation of the ConAgra Foods campus. Several nearby buildings, including the Nash Block, have been converted into condominiums. The stockyards were taken down; the only surviving building is the Livestock Exchange Building, which was converted to multi-use and listed on the National Register of Historic Places.

A historic preservation movement in Omaha has led to a number of historic structures and districts being designated Omaha Landmarks or listed on the National Register of Historic Places. Much of the push toward preservation came after Omaha gained the notorious designation of having, in 1989, demolished the largest-ever National Register historic district in the United States, a record that still stands as of 2013. The Jobbers Canyon Historic District, along the Missouri River, was felled for a new headquarters campus for ConAgra Foods, a company which threatened to relocate if Omaha did not allow them to raze the city's historic district. The Jobber's Canyon warehouses had before then been allowed to deteriorate and were the scene of several fires set by the homeless population that had come to live in the abandoned buildings. At the time, there were no plans in place for revitalizing the buildings.

In the 1980s and 1990s, Omaha also saw major company headquarters leave the city, including Enron, founded in the city in 1930 and taken to Houston in 1987 by the now-notorious Kenneth Lay. First Data Corporation, a large credit-card processor, also was founded in Omaha in 1969; as of 2009, its headquarters are in Atlanta.

Inacom, founded in Omaha in 1991, was a technology company that customized computer systems for large businesses, and was on the Fortune 500 list from 1997 until 2000, when it filed for bankruptcy. Northwestern Bell, the Bell System affiliate for Northwestern states, had its headquarters in Omaha from its founding in 1896 until it moved to Denver in 1991 as US West. Level 3 Communications, a large Tier 1 network provider, was founded in Omaha in 1985 as Kiewit Diversified Group, a division of Kiewit Corporation, a Fortune 500 construction and mining company still headquartered in Omaha; Level 3 moved to Denver in 1998. World Com was founded by a merger with Omaha's MFS Communications, started as Metropolitan Fiber Systems in 1993. MFS, backed by Kiewit Corporation CEO Walter Scott Jr. and Omaha native Warren Buffett, purchased UUNET, one of the largest Internet backbones in the world, for $2 billion in 1996. The now-infamous Bernie Ebbers purchased the much larger MFS for $14.3 billion in 1997 under his World Com. He moved headquarters of the merged company from Omaha to Mississippi.

=== 21st century ===
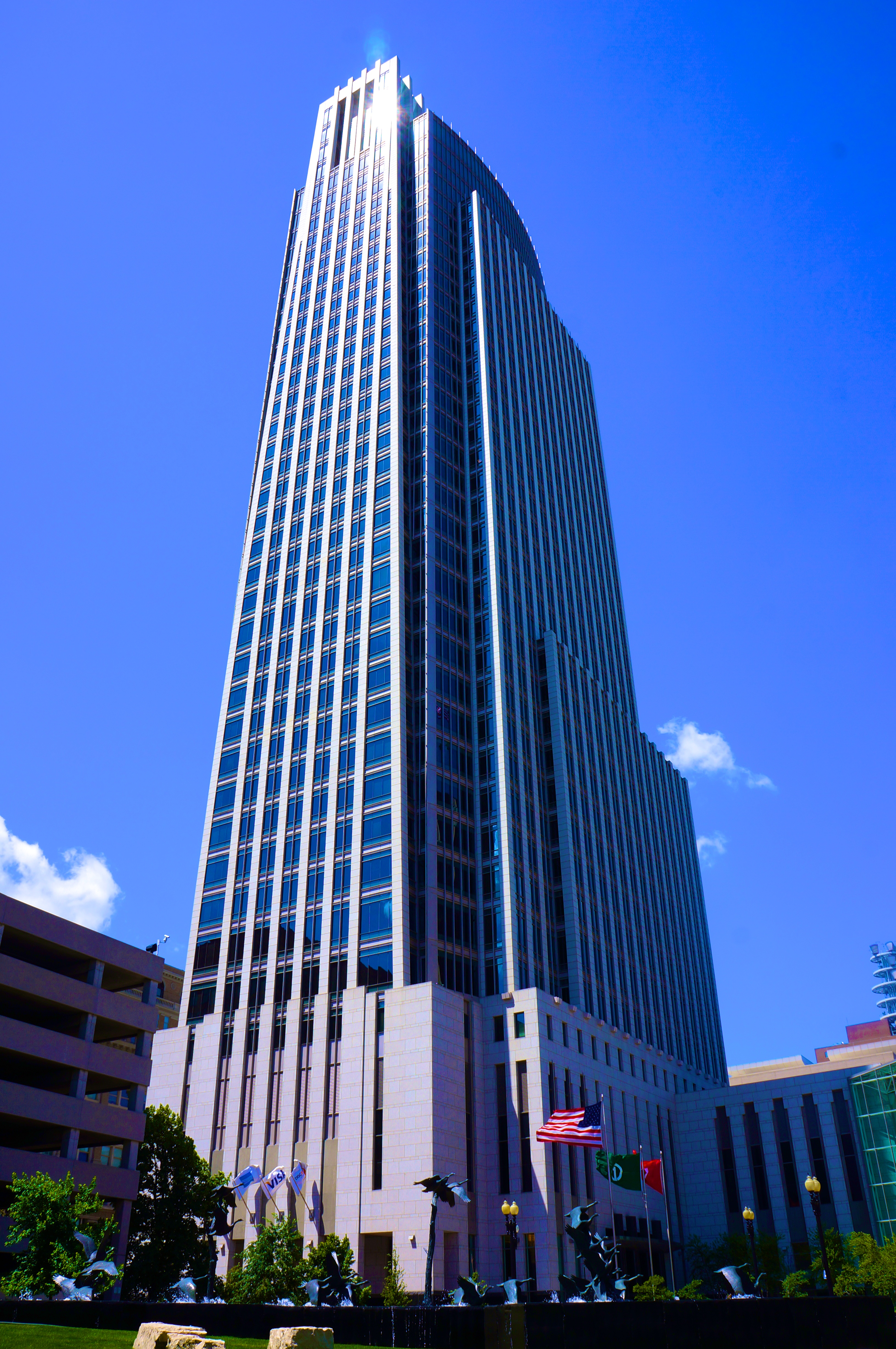
First National Bank Tower, the tallest building in Omaha

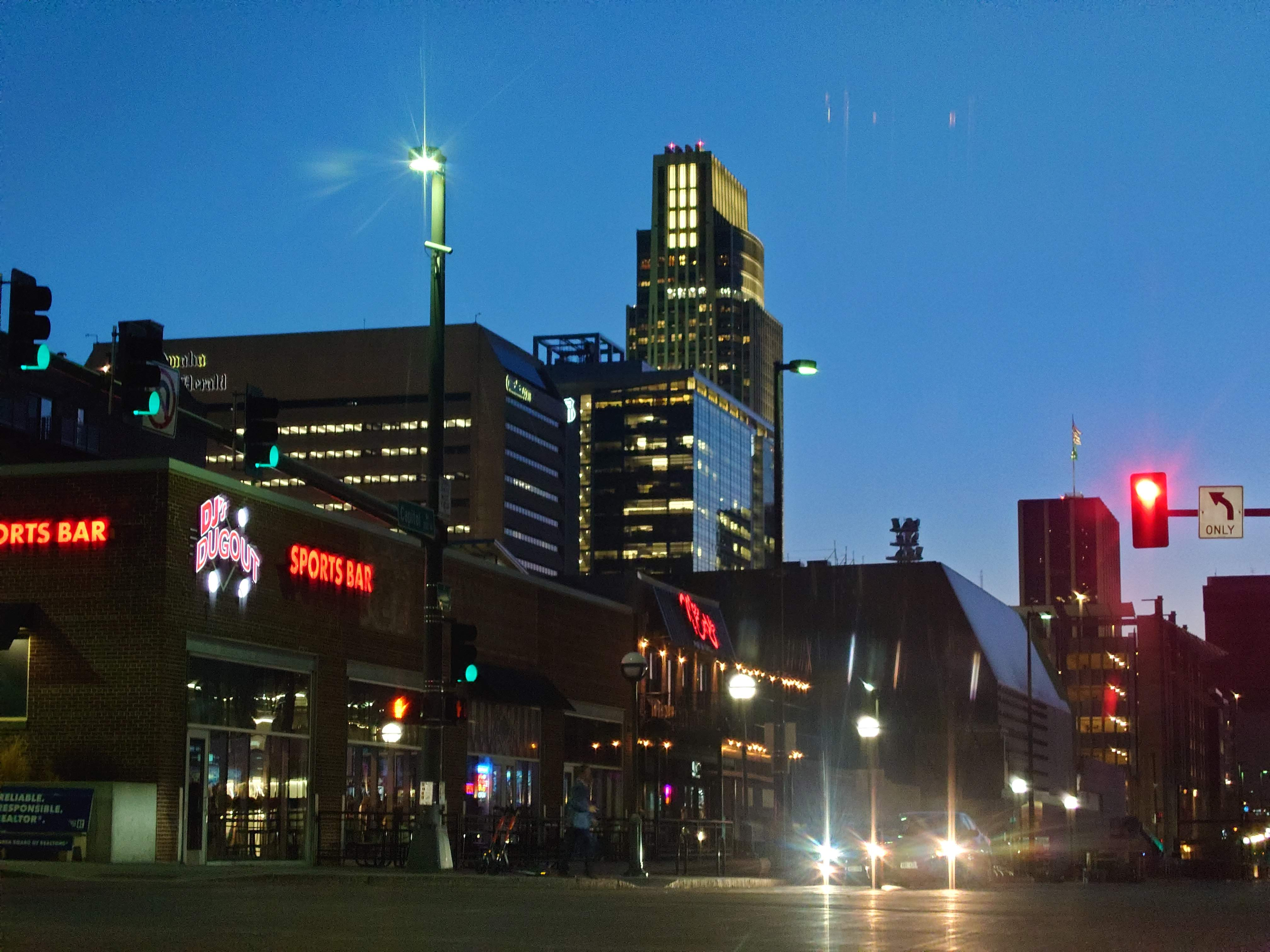
Omaha at night, in 2021, as seen from the intersection of 10th and Capitol streets

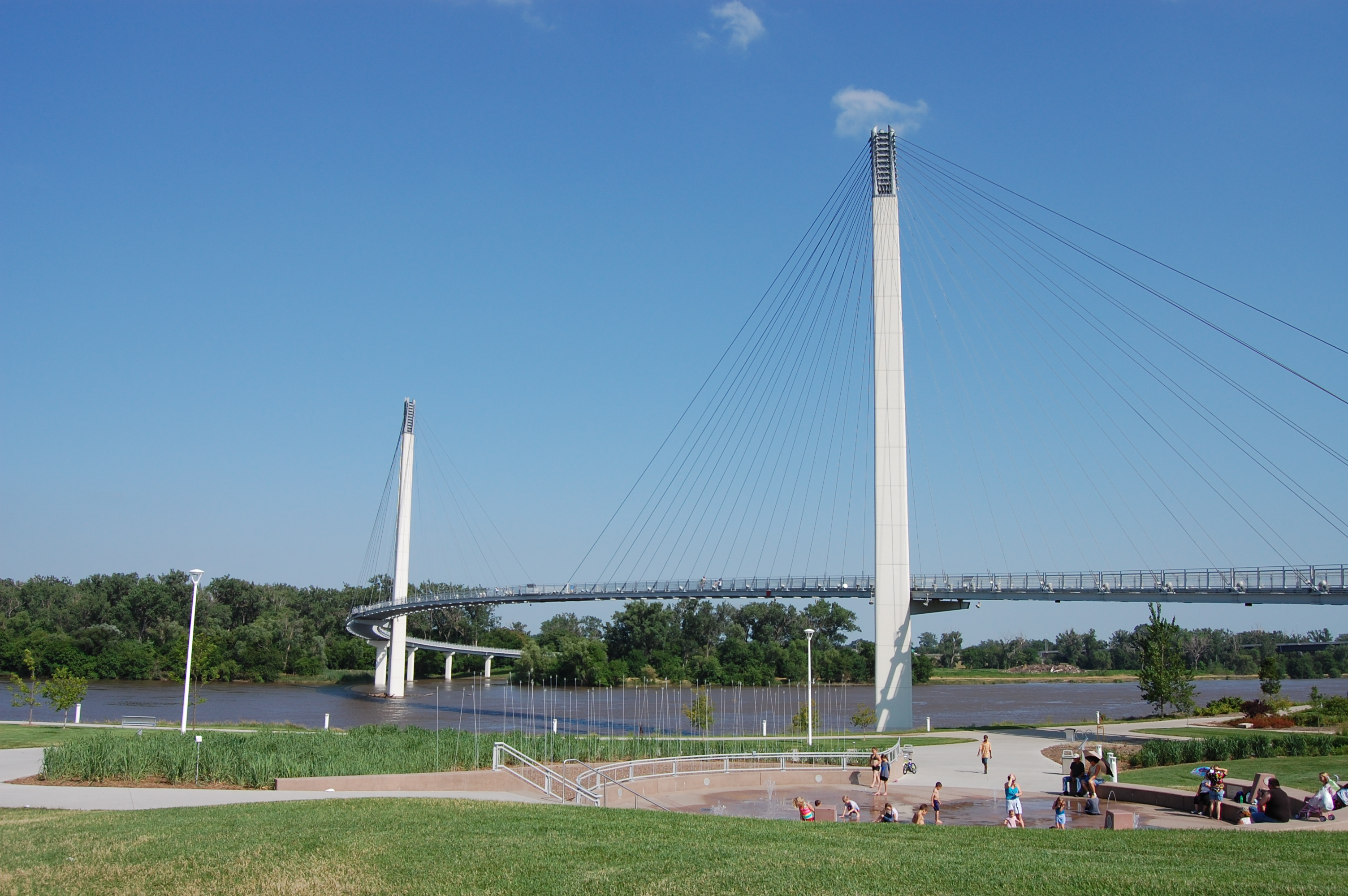
Bob Kerrey Pedestrian Bridge

Around the start of the 21st century, several downtown skyscrapers and cultural institutions were built.

The First National Bank Tower on Dodge Street was completed in 2002 and was the tallest building in Omaha and the state, surpassing the Woodmen Tower as the tallest in both at 634 ft (193 m). The creation of the city's new North Downtown included the construction of the CenturyLink Center and the Slowdown/Film Streams development at North 14th and Webster Streets. Construction of the new TD Ameritrade Park, also in the North Downtown area, began in 2009 and was completed in 2011. TD Ameritrade Park is now the home of the College World Series, an event tourists flock to each year. The Union Pacific Center and the Holland Performing Arts Center opened in 2004 and 2005, respectively.

Important retail and office developments occurred in West Omaha, such as the Village Pointe shopping center and several business parks. The site of the former Ak-Sar-Ben arena was redeveloped into a mixed-use development Aksarben Village. In January 2009, Blue Cross Blue Shield of Nebraska announced plans to build a 10 story, $98 million headquarters in the Aksarben Village which it completed in Spring 2011. Another major mixed-use development to come to Omaha was Midtown Crossing at Turner Park. Developed by Mutual of Omaha, the development includes several condominium towers and retail businesses built around Omaha's Turner Park.

There have also been several developments along the Missouri River waterfront near downtown. The Bob Kerrey Pedestrian Bridge was opened to foot and bicycle traffic on September 28, 2008. Started in 2003, RiverFront Place Condos first phase was completed in 2006 and the second phase was opened in 2011. The development along Omaha's riverfront is attributed with prompting the City of Council Bluffs to move their own riverfront development time line forward.

In the summers of 2008, 2012, 2016, and 2021 the United States Olympic Team swimming trials were held in Omaha, at the Qwest/Century Link Center. These events were highlights in the city's sports community, as well as a showcase for redevelopment in the downtown area.

In the 2020s, a number of large projects have been either completed or planned in an attempt to revitalize downtown Omaha. These include the redevelopment of the Gene Leahy Mall, a large park near Omaha's Riverfront, and the Omaha Streetcar, a nearly $500 million system of public transit. A new skyscraper, the Mutual of Omaha Headquarters Tower, at 677 feet (206 m), will be the new tallest building in Omaha and the state upon its completion in 2026.

Douglas County treasurer John Ewing was elected mayor in 2025, ending Stothert's 12-year long administration. He is the first black mayor of Omaha.

== Geography ==
According to the United States Census Bureau, the city has a total area of 130.58 sq mi (338.20 km^{2}), of which 127.09 sq mi (329.16 km^{2}) is land and 3.49 sq mi (9.04 km^{2}) is water. Situated in the Midwestern United States on the bank of the Missouri River in eastern Nebraska, much of Omaha is built in the Missouri River Valley. Other significant bodies of water in the Omaha-Council Bluffs metropolitan area include Lake Manawa, Papillion Creek, Carter Lake, Platte River and the Glenn Cunningham Lake. The city's land has been altered considerably with substantial land grading throughout Downtown Omaha and scattered across the city. East Omaha sits on a flood plain west of the Missouri River. The area is the location of Carter Lake, an oxbow lake. The lake was once the site of East Omaha Island and Florence Lake, which dried up in the 1920s.

=== Metropolitan area ===
The Omaha-Council Bluffs metropolitan area consists of eight counties; five in Nebraska and three in Iowa. The metropolitan area now includes Harrison, Pottawattamie, and Mills Counties in Iowa and Washington, Douglas, Sarpy, Cass, and Saunders Counties in Nebraska. This area was formerly referred to only as the Omaha Metropolitan Statistical Area and consisted of only five counties: Pottawattamie in Iowa, and Washington, Douglas, Cass, and Sarpy in Nebraska. The Omaha-Council Bluffs combined statistical area comprises the Omaha-Council Bluffs metropolitan statistical area and the Fremont Micropolitan statistical area; the CSA has a population of 858,720 (2005 Census Bureau estimate). Omaha ranks as the 41st-most populous city in the United States, and is the core city of its 60th-largest metropolitan area. There are no consolidated city-counties in the area; the City of Omaha studied the possibility extensively through 2003 and concluded, "The City of Omaha and Douglas County should merge into a municipal county, work to commence immediately, and that functional consolidations begin immediately in as many departments as possible, including but not limited to parks, fleet management, facilities management, local planning, purchasing and personnel."

Geographically, Omaha is considered as being in the "Heartland" of the United States. Important environmental impacts on the natural habitat in the area include the spread of invasive plant species, restoring prairies and bur oak savanna habitats, and managing the whitetail deer population.

Omaha is home to several hospitals, mostly along Dodge Street (US6). Being the county seat, it is also the location of the county courthouse.

=== Neighborhoods ===
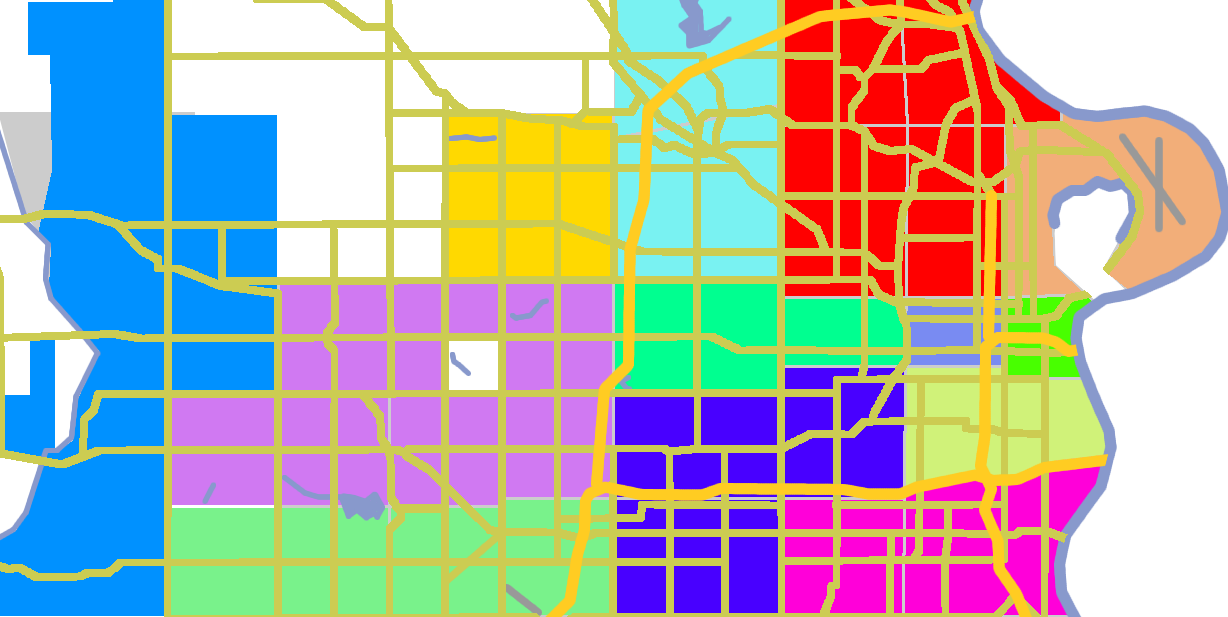
Downtown: lime, Midtown: blue-gray, North: red, South: pink, West: lavender

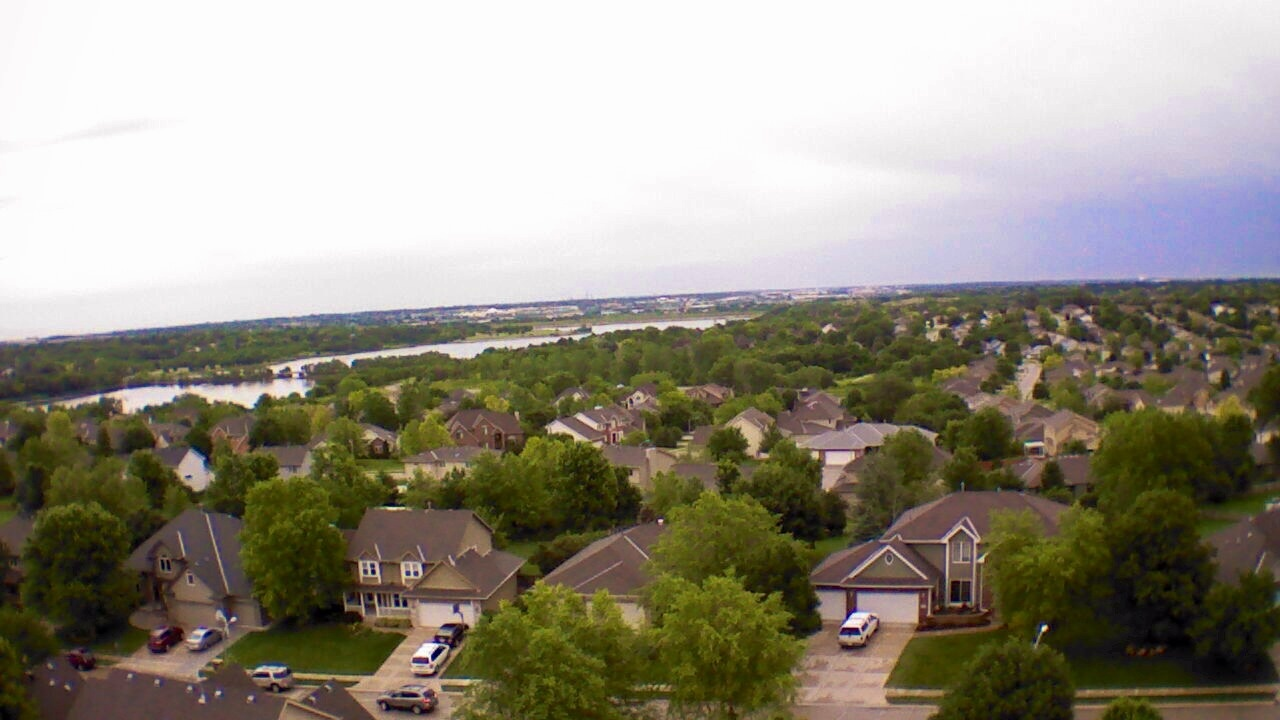
View from above West Omaha

Omaha is generally divided into six geographic areas: Downtown, Midtown, North Omaha, South Omaha, West Omaha, and East Omaha. West Omaha includes the Miracle Hills, Boys Town, Regency, and Gateway areas. The city has a wide range of historical and new neighborhoods and suburbs that reflect its socioeconomic diversity. Early neighborhood development happened in ethnic enclaves, including Little Italy, Little Bohemia, Little Mexico and Greek Town. According to U.S. Census data, five European ethnic enclaves existed in Omaha in 1880, expanding to nine in 1900.

Around the start of the 20th century. the City of Omaha annexed several surrounding communities, including Florence, Dundee and Benson. At the same time, the city annexed all of South Omaha, including the Dahlman and Burlington Road neighborhoods. From its first annexation in 1857 (of East Omaha) to its controversial annexation of Elkhorn in 2007, Omaha has continually had an eye towards growth.

Starting in the 1950s, development of highways and new housing led to the movement of the middle class to suburbs in West Omaha. Some of the movement was designated as white flight from racial unrest in the 1960s. Newer and poorer migrants lived in older housing close to downtown; those residents who were more established moved west into newer housing. Some suburbs are gated communities or have become edge cities. Recently, Omahans have made strides to revitalize the downtown and Midtown areas with the redevelopment of the Old Market, Turner Park, Gifford Park, and the designation of the Omaha Rail and Commerce Historic District.

=== Climate ===
Climate chart for Omaha

Omaha, due to its latitude of 41.26˚ N and location far from moderating bodies of water or mountain ranges, displays a hot-summer humid continental climate (Köppen: Dfa). July averages 76.7 °F (24.8 °C), with average relative humidity around 70% which then leads to relatively frequent thunderstorms. Temperatures reach 90 °F (32 °C) on 29 days and 100 °F (38 °C) on 1.7 days annually. The January daily average is 23.5 °F (−4.7 °C), with lows reaching 0 °F (−18 °C) on 11 days annually. The lowest temperature recorded in the city was −32 °F (−35.6 °C) on January 5, 1884, and the highest 114 °F (45.6 °C) on July 25, 1936. Average yearly precipitation is 30.6 in (777 mm), falling mostly in the warmer months. Snow is the most common precipitation in winter, with average seasonal snowfall being 28.7 in (72.9 cm).

Based on 30-year averages obtained from NOAA's National Climatic Data Center for the months of December, January and February, Weather Channel ranked Omaha the 5th coldest major U.S. city as of 2014.

Climate data for Omaha (Eppley Airfield), 1991–2020 normals (Note: Mean monthly maxima and minima (i.e. the expected highest and lowest temperature readings at any point during the year or given month) calculated based on data at said location from 1991 to 2020.), extremes 1871–present (Note: Official records for Omaha kept at the Weather Bureau Office from January 1871 to May 1935 and at Eppley Airfield since June 1935 except for June 1977 thru December 1993 when the official station was Omaha WSFO.)
Month	Jan	Feb	Mar	Apr	May	Jun	Jul	Aug	Sep	Oct	Nov	Dec	Year
Record high °F (°C)	69 (21)	80 (27)	96 (36)	96 (36)	103 (39)	107 (42)	114 (46)	111 (44)	104 (40)	96 (36)	83 (28)	74 (23)	114 (46)
Mean maximum °F (°C)	56.2 (13.4)	61.6 (16.4)	77.3 (25.2)	86.3 (30.2)	91.3 (32.9)	95.9 (35.5)	98.4 (36.9)	96.8 (36.0)	93.0 (33.9)	85.3 (29.6)	71.2 (21.8)	58.3 (14.6)	99.8 (37.7)
Mean daily maximum °F (°C)	33.6 (0.9)	38.6 (3.7)	52.1 (11.2)	64.1 (17.8)	74.6 (23.7)	84.4 (29.1)	88.1 (31.2)	85.8 (29.9)	79.1 (26.2)	65.5 (18.6)	50.3 (10.2)	37.7 (3.2)	62.8 (17.1)
Daily mean °F (°C)	24.4 (−4.2)	28.9 (−1.7)	41.0 (5.0)	52.6 (11.4)	63.6 (17.6)	73.9 (23.3)	78.1 (25.6)	75.7 (24.3)	67.6 (19.8)	54.4 (12.4)	40.2 (4.6)	28.7 (−1.8)	52.4 (11.3)
Mean daily minimum °F (°C)	15.2 (−9.3)	19.3 (−7.1)	30.0 (−1.1)	41.1 (5.1)	52.7 (11.5)	63.4 (17.4)	68.0 (20.0)	65.6 (18.7)	56.1 (13.4)	43.2 (6.2)	30.2 (−1.0)	19.8 (−6.8)	42.1 (5.6)
Mean minimum °F (°C)	−7.0 (−21.7)	−2.1 (−18.9)	8.8 (−12.9)	24.1 (−4.4)	37.1 (2.8)	49.8 (9.9)	55.8 (13.2)	53.6 (12.0)	39.4 (4.1)	25.7 (−3.5)	12.9 (−10.6)	−0.8 (−18.2)	−10.6 (−23.7)
Record low °F (°C)	−32 (−36)	−26 (−32)	−16 (−27)	5 (−15)	25 (−4)	39 (4)	44 (7)	43 (6)	28 (−2)	8 (−13)	−14 (−26)	−25 (−32)	−32 (−36)
Average precipitation inches (mm)	0.75 (19)	0.95 (24)	1.79 (45)	3.17 (81)	4.66 (118)	4.44 (113)	3.55 (90)	4.60 (117)	2.96 (75)	2.32 (59)	1.45 (37)	1.22 (31)	31.86 (809)
Average snowfall inches (cm)	7.2 (18)	7.8 (20)	3.0 (7.6)	1.0 (2.5)	0.1 (0.25)	0.0 (0.0)	0.0 (0.0)	0.0 (0.0)	0.0 (0.0)	0.5 (1.3)	1.7 (4.3)	5.8 (15)	27.1 (69)
Average extreme snow depth inches (cm)	5.5 (14)	6.2 (16)	3.2 (8.1)	0.6 (1.5)	0.1 (0.25)	0.0 (0.0)	0.0 (0.0)	0.0 (0.0)	0.0 (0.0)	0.4 (1.0)	0.8 (2.0)	3.6 (9.1)	9.1 (23)
Average precipitation days (≥ 0.01 in)	6.9	7.3	8.0	10.5	12.8	11.0	9.9	8.9	7.8	7.2	6.0	6.8	103.1
Average snowy days (≥ 0.1 in)	5.6	5.7	2.4	0.9	0.1	0.0	0.0	0.0	0.0	0.4	1.8	4.8	21.7
Average relative humidity (%)	71.1	71.1	66.3	60.6	63.8	65.8	68.3	70.9	71.8	67.4	71.1	73.8	68.5
Average dew point °F (°C)	12.7 (−10.7)	17.8 (−7.9)	26.8 (−2.9)	37.0 (2.8)	48.7 (9.3)	59.2 (15.1)	64.8 (18.2)	63.0 (17.2)	54.3 (12.4)	41.4 (5.2)	29.5 (−1.4)	17.6 (−8.0)	39.4 (4.1)
Mean monthly sunshine hours	167.8	157.6	206.4	230.1	277.1	314.0	332.5	296.3	245.5	217.5	148.0	134.1	2,726.9
Percentage possible sunshine	56	53	56	58	62	69	72	69	66	63	50	47	61
Average ultraviolet index	2	2	4	6	8	9	9	8	6	4	2	1	5
Source: NOAA (relative humidity 1961–1990 at Eppley Airfield, sun 1961–1990 at former Omaha NWS weather forecast office at 41.3536°N 96.0233°W)

== Demographics ==
Historical population
Census	Pop.	Note	%±
1860	1,883		—
1870	16,083		754.1%
1880	30,518		89.8%
1890	140,452		360.2%
1900	102,555		−27.0%
1910	124,096		21.0%
1920	191,061		54.0%
1930	214,006		12.0%
1940	223,844		4.6%
1950	251,117		12.2%
1960	301,598		20.1%
1970	346,929		15.0%
1980	313,939		−9.5%
1990	335,795		7.0%
2000	390,007		16.1%
2010	408,958		4.9%
2020	486,051		18.9%
2025 (est.)	488,797	▲	0.6%
Source: U.S. Decennial Census; 2010–2020

View source data.

Historical Racial composition	2020	2010	1990	1970	1940
White	65.5%	73.1%	83.9%	89.4%	94.5%
Black	12.4%	13.7%	13.1%	9.9%	5.4%
Native American/Alaska Native	1.1%	0.8%	0.7%		
Hispanic or Latino (of any race)	14.0%	13.1%	3.1%	1.9% (Note: From 15% sample)	n/a
Asian	4.6%	2.4%	1.0%	0.2%	0.1%
Non-Hispanic White	66.6%	68.0%	82.3%	87.5%	n/a
Two or More Races	9.1%	3.0%			

=== 2020 census ===
Omaha, Nebraska – Racial and ethnic composition Note: the US Census treats Hispanic/Latino as an ethnic category. This table excludes Latinos from the racial categories and assigns them to a separate category. Hispanics/Latinos may be of any race.
Race / Ethnicity (NH = Non-Hispanic)	Pop. 2000	Pop. 2010	Pop. 2020	% 2000	% 2010	% 2020
White alone (NH)	293,876	278,172	302,548	75.35%	68.02%	62.25%
Black or African American alone (NH)	51,427	55,128	59,347	13.19%	13.48%	12.21%
Native American or Alaska Native alone (NH)	2,238	2,263	2,419	0.57%	0.55%	0.50%
Asian alone (NH)	6,685	9,889	22,184	1.71%	2.42%	4.56%
Pacific Islander alone (NH)	192	253	379	0.05%	0.06%	0.08%
Other race alone (NH)	448	806	1,999	0.11%	0.20%	0.41%
Mixed race or Multiracial (NH)	5,744	8,894	21,612	1.47%	2.17%	4.45%
Hispanic or Latino (any race)	29,397	53,553	75,563	7.54%	13.09%	15.55%
Total	390,007	408,958	486,051	100.00%	100.00%	100.00%

The 2020 United States census counted 486,051 people, 189,922 households, and 113,245 families in Omaha. The population density was 3,406.8 per square mile (1,315.4/km^{2}). There were 203,215 housing units, at an average density of 1,424.4 per square mile (550.0/km^{2}). The racial makeup (including Hispanics in the racial counts) was 65.47% (318,218) white, 12.4% (60,280) black or African-American, 1.12% (5,426) Native American, 4.6% (22,377) Asian, 0.09% (461) Pacific Islander, 7.25% (35,233) from other races, and 9.06% (44,056) from two or more races. Hispanic or Latino of any race was 14.0% (67,715) of the population.

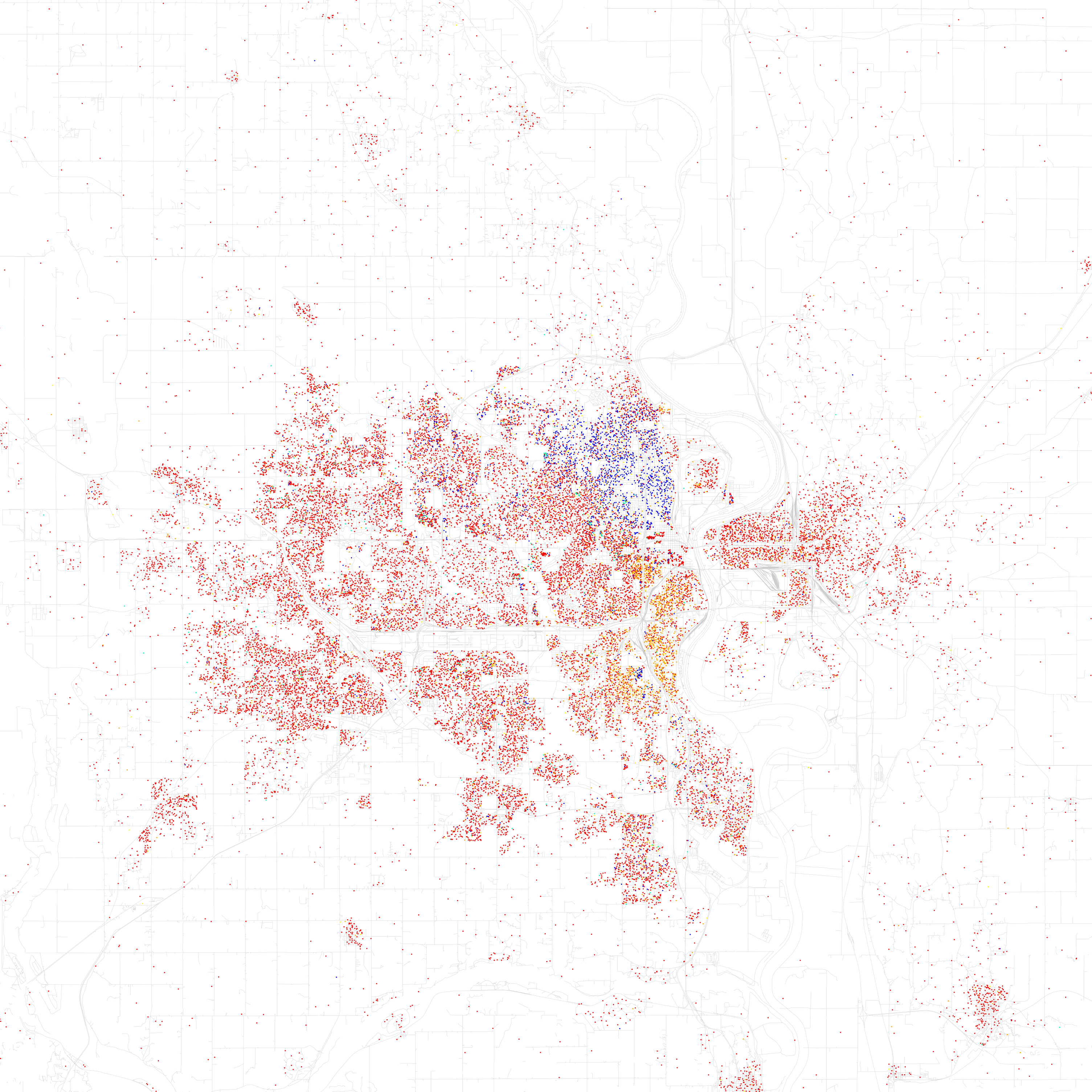
Map of racial distribution in Omaha, 2010 U.S. Census. Each dot is 25 people: ⬤ White ⬤ Black ⬤ Asian ⬤ Hispanic ⬤ Other

Of the 189,922 households, 28.3% had children under the age of 18; 43.0% were married couples living together; 29.2% had a female householder with no husband present. 33.2% of households consisted of individuals and 10.7% had someone living alone who was 65 years of age or older. The average household size was 2.5 and the average family size was 3.2.

24.5% of the population was under the age of 18, 9.6% from 18 to 24, 28.2% from 25 to 44, 23.2% from 45 to 64, and 13.1% who were 65 years of age or older. The median age was 34.9 years. For every 100 females, the population had 97.1 males. For every 100 females ages 18 and older, there were 95.0 males.

The 2016–2020 5-year American Community Survey estimates show that the median household income was $62,213 (with a margin of error of +/- $969) and the median family income $80,956 (+/- $1,380). Males had a median income of $41,528 (+/- $592) versus $31,295 (+/- $490) for females. The median income for those above 16 years old was $36,290 (+/- $532). Approximately, 8.0% of families and 12.0% of the population were below the poverty line, including 15.6% of those under the age of 18 and 7.8% of those ages 65 or over.

=== 2010 census ===
As of the census of 2010, there were 408,958 people, 162,627 households, and 96,477 families residing in the city. The population density was 3,217.9/sq mi (1,242.4/km^{2}). There were 177,518 housing units, at an average density of 1,396.8/sq mi (539.3/km^{2}). The city's racial makeup was 73.1% White, 13.7% African American, 0.8% Native American, 2.4% Asian, 0.1% Pacific Islander, 6.9% from other races, and 3.0% from two or more races. Hispanic or Latino people of any race were 13.1% of the population. Non-Hispanic Whites were 68.0% of the population.

There were 162,627 households, of which 31.3% had children under the age of 18 living with them, 40.6% were married couples living together, 13.7% had a female householder with no husband present, 4.9% had a male householder with no wife present, and 40.7% were non-families. 32.3% of all households were made up of individuals, and 9.3% had someone living alone who was at least 65 years old. The average household size was 2.45 and the average family size was 3.14.

The median age in the city was 33.5 years. 25.1% of residents were under the age of 18; 11.4% were between the ages of 18 and 24; 27.9% were from 25 to 44; 24.4% were from 45 to 64; and 11.4% were 65 years of age or older. The city's gender makeup was 49.2% male and 50.8% female.

The median household income (in 2017 dollars) from 2013 to 2017 was $53,789.

=== Crime ===
As a major industrial city into the mid-20th century, Omaha shared in social tensions that came with rapid growth and the arrival of large numbers of immigrants and migrants. Persistent poverty resulting from racial discrimination and job losses generated different crimes in the late 20th century, with the drug trade and drug abuse becoming associated with violent crime rates, which climbed after 1986 as Los Angeles gangs made affiliates in the city.

Gambling in Omaha has been an important part of the city's history. From its founding in the 1850s through the 1930s, the city was known as a "wide-open" town where gambling of all sorts was openly accepted. By the 1950s, at the same time large-scale restructuring of the railroads, the meatpacking industry and other sectors caused widespread job losses and unemployment, Omaha reportedly had more illicit gambling than any other city in the nation. From the 1930s through the 1970s, a Mafia-based criminal element controlled gambling in the city.

As most forms of gambling are currently restricted in Nebraska, gambling in Omaha is limited to keno, lotteries, and parimutuel betting. This leaves Omahans to drive across the Missouri River to Council Bluffs, Iowa, where casinos are legal and many businesses operate. Recently, the National Indian Gaming Commission approved a controversial proposal made by the Ponca tribe of Nebraska. It will allow the tribe to build a casino in Carter Lake, Iowa, which sits on the west side of the Missouri River, adjacent to Omaha, where casinos are illegal.

=== People ===
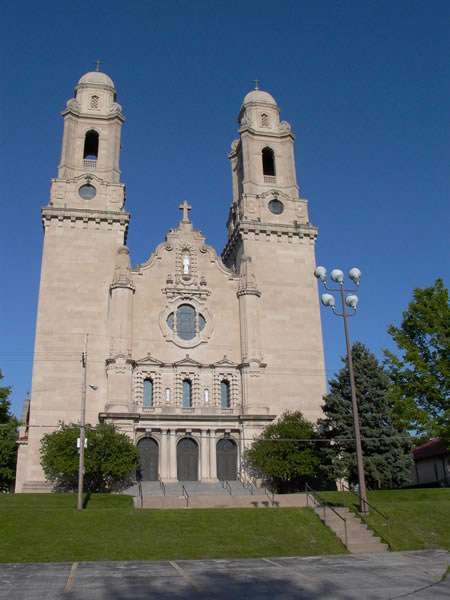
Saint Cecilia Cathedral

Native Americans were the first residents of the Omaha area. The city of Omaha was established by white settlers from neighboring Council Bluffs who arrived from the Mid-Atlantic states a few years earlier. While much of the early population was of Upland Southern stock, over the next 100 years numerous ethnic groups moved to the city. In 1910, the Census Bureau reported Omaha's population as 96.4% White and 3.6% Black. Irish immigrants in Omaha originally moved to an area in present-day North Omaha called Gophertown, as they lived in dug-out sod houses. That population was followed by Polish immigrants in the Sheelytown neighborhood, and many immigrants were recruited for jobs in South Omaha's stockyards and meatpacking industry. The German community in Omaha was largely responsible for founding its once-thriving beer industry, including the Metz, Krug, Falstaff and Storz breweries.

Since its founding, ethnic groups in the city have clustered in enclaves in north, south and downtown Omaha. In its early days, the sometimes lawless nature of a new frontier city included crime, such as illicit gambling and riots.

In the early 20th century, Jewish immigrants set up many businesses along the North 24th Street commercial area. It suffered with the loss of industrial jobs in the 1960s and, later, the shifting of population west of the city. The commercial area is now the center of the African-American community, concentrated in North Omaha. The African American community has maintained its social and religious base, while it is experiencing an economic revitalization.

The Little Italy neighborhood grew south of downtown, as many Italian immigrants came to the city to work in the Union Pacific shops. Scandinavians first came to Omaha as Mormon settlers in the Florence neighborhood. Czechs had a strong political and cultural voice in Omaha, and were involved in a variety of trades and businesses, including banks, wholesale houses and funeral homes. The Notre Dame Academy and Convent and Czechoslovak Museum are legacies of their residence. The legacy of the city's early European immigrant populations is evident in many social and cultural institutions in Downtown and South Omaha.

Mexicans originally immigrated to Omaha to work in the rail yards. Today they account for most of South Omaha's Hispanic population and many have taken jobs in meat processing. Other large early ethnic populations in Omaha included Danes, Poles, and Swedes.

A growing number of African immigrants have made their homes in Omaha in the last twenty years. There are approximately 8,500 Sudanese living in Omaha, including the largest population of Sudanese refugees in the United States. Most have immigrated since 1995 because of warfare in Sudan. They represent ten ethnic groups, including the Nuer, Dinka, Equatorians, Maubans and Nubians. Most Sudanese people in Omaha speak the Nuer language. Other Africans have immigrated to Omaha as well, with one-third from Nigeria, and large populations from Kenya, Togo, Cameroon and Ghana.

With the expansion of railroad and industrial jobs in meatpacking, Omaha attracted many immigrants and migrants. As the major city in Nebraska, it has historically been more racially and ethnically diverse than the rest of the state. At times rapid population change, overcrowded housing and job competition have aroused racial and ethnic tensions. Around the start of the 20th century, violence towards new immigrants in Omaha often erupted out of suspicion and fear.

In 1909, anti-Greek sentiment flared after increased Greek immigration, and worsened their tendency to become strikebreakers. The killing of a policeman of Irish descent enraged the Irish community; an angry mob violently stormed the Greek neighborhood in Omaha in what would become known as the Greek Town Riot. That mob violence forced the Greek immigrant population to flee from the city. By 1910, 53.7% of Omaha's residents and 64.2% of South Omaha's residents were foreign born or had at least one parent born outside of America.

Six years after the Greek Town Riot, in 1915, a mob killed Juan Gonzalez, a Mexican immigrant, near Scribner, a town in the Greater Omaha metropolitan area. The event occurred after an Omaha Police Department officer investigated a criminal operation that sold goods stolen from the nearby railroad yards. Racial profiling targeted Gonzalez as the culprit. After escaping the city, he was trapped along the Elkhorn River, where the mob, including several policemen from Omaha, shot him more than twenty times. It was discovered Gonzalez was unarmed, and he had a reliable alibi for the time of the murder. No one was ever indicted for his killing.

In the fall of 1919, following Red Summer, postwar social and economic tensions, the earlier hiring of African Americans as strikebreakers, and job uncertainty contributed to a mob from South Omaha lynching Willy Brown and the ensuing Omaha Race Riot. Trying to defend Brown, the city's mayor, Edward Parsons Smith, was lynched also, surviving only after a quick rescue.

Like other industrial cities in the U.S., Omaha suffered severe job losses in the 1950s, more than 10,000 in all, as the railroad and meatpacking industries restructured. Stockyards and packing plants were located closer to ranches, and union achievements were lost as wages declined in surviving jobs. Many workers left the area if they could get to other jobs. Poverty deepened in areas of the city whose residents depended on those jobs, specifically North and South Omaha. At the same time, with reduced revenues, the city had less financial ability to respond to longstanding problems.

Despair after the April 1968 assassination of Martin Luther King Jr. contributed to riots in North Omaha, including one at the Logan Fontenelle Housing Project. For some, the civil rights movement in Omaha, Nebraska evolved towards black nationalism, as the Black Panther Party was involved in tensions in the late 1960s. Organizations such as the Black Association for Nationalism Through Unity became popular among the city's African-American youth. This tension culminated in the cause célèbre trial of the Rice/Poindexter Case, in which an Omaha Police Department officer was killed by a bomb while answering an emergency call.

Whites in Omaha have followed the white flight pattern, suburbanizing to West Omaha. In the late 1990s and early 2000s, gang violence and incidents between the Omaha Police and Black residents undermined relations between groups in North and South Omaha.

== Economy ==
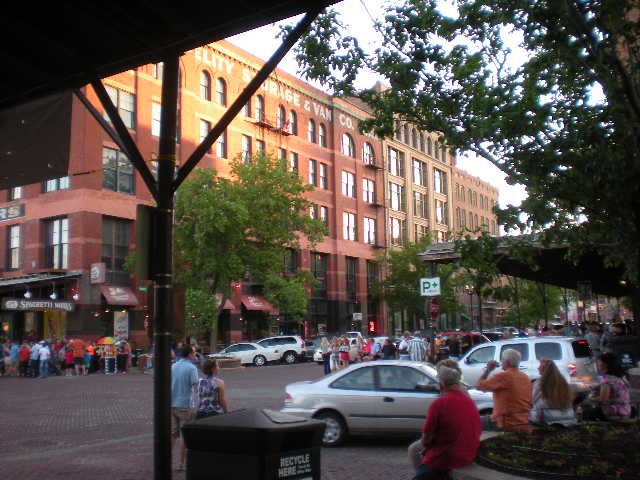
Old Market in Downtown Omaha

With diversification in several industries, including banking, insurance, telecommunications, architecture/construction, and transportation, Omaha's economy has grown since the early 1990s, and six national fiber optic networks converge in Omaha.

Omaha's most prominent businessman is Warren Buffett, nicknamed the "Oracle of Omaha", who for decades has ranked as one of the richest people in the world. Four Omaha-based companies: Berkshire Hathaway, Union Pacific Railroad, Mutual of Omaha, and Kiewit Corporation, are among the Fortune 500.

Omaha is the headquarters of several other major corporations, including the Gallup Organization, Werner Enterprises, First National Bank of Omaha, WoodmenLife, Gavilon, Scoular and First Comp Insurance. Many other large national firms have major operations or operational headquarters in Omaha, including Bank of the West, First Data, Sojern, PayPal, LinkedIn, Pacific Life, MetLife and Conagra Brands. The city is also home to three of the 30 largest architecture firms in the United States, including HDR, Inc., DLR Group, Inc., and Leo A Daly.

=== Top employers ===
According to the Greater Omaha Chamber of Commerce, the largest regional employers are:

#	Employer	Employees
1	Offutt Air Force Base	7,500+
2	CHI Health	7,500+
3	Omaha Public Schools	5,000–7,499
4	Methodist Health System	5,000–7,499
5	Nebraska Medical Center	5,200
6	University of Nebraska Medical Center	2,500-4,999
7	First Data	2,500-4,999
8	Union Pacific	2,500-4,999
9	Hy-Vee	2,500-4,999
10	First National Bank of Omaha	2,500-4,999

=== Tourism ===
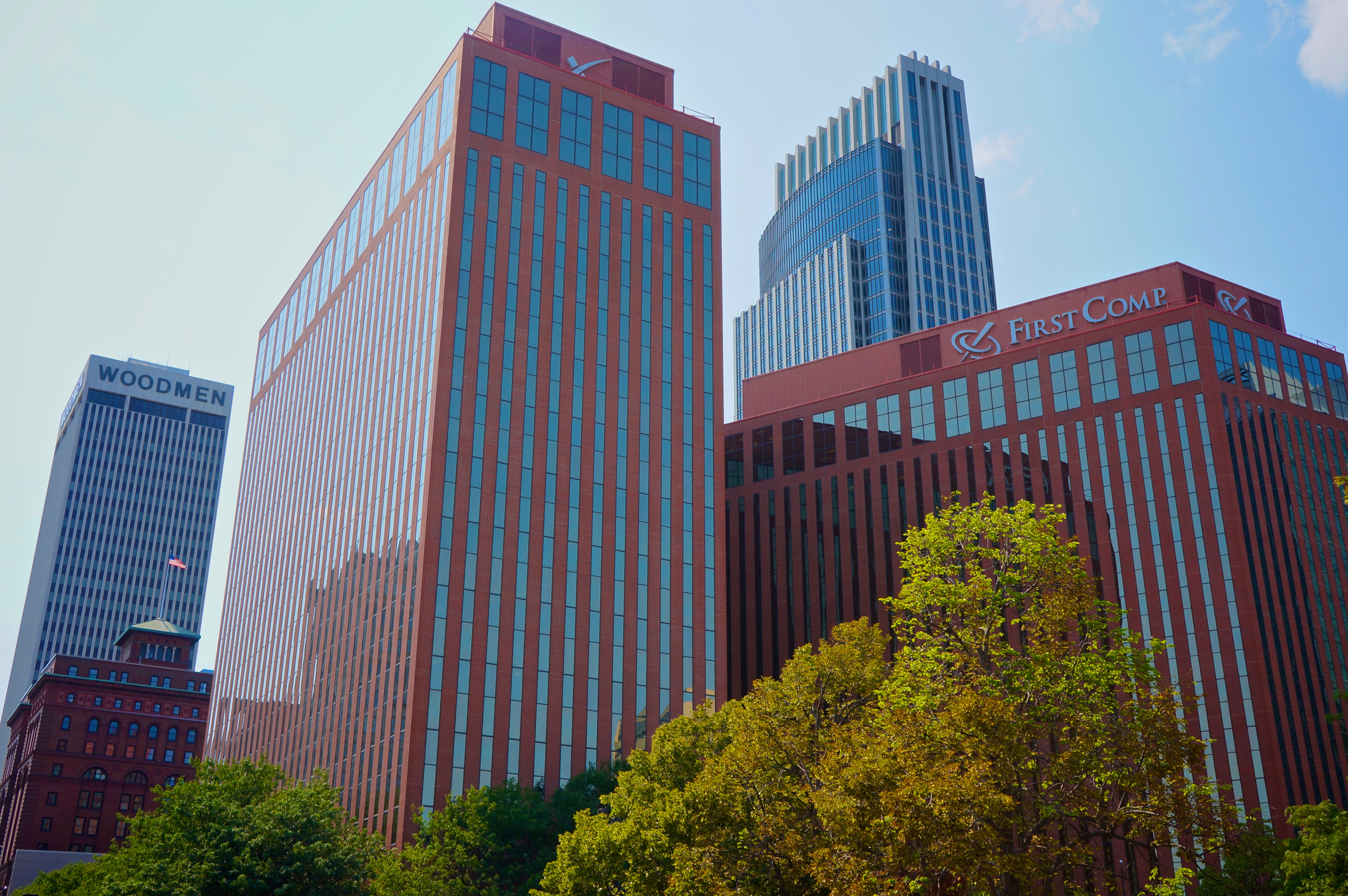
Office buildings in downtown Omaha

Tourist attractions in Omaha include history, sports, outdoors and cultural experiences. Its principal tourist attractions are the Henry Doorly Zoo and the College World Series. The Old Market in Downtown Omaha is another major attraction and is important to the city's retail economy. Famous early visitors included British author Rudyard Kipling and General George Crook. In 1883 Omaha hosted the first official performance of the Buffalo Bill's Wild West Show for 8,000 attendees. In 1898 the city hosted more than 1 million visitors from across the United States at the Trans-Mississippi and International Exposition, a world's fair that lasted for more than half the year.

Research on leisure and hospitality situates Omaha in the same tier for tourists as the neighboring cities of Des Moines, Iowa; Topeka, Kansas; Kansas City, Missouri; Oklahoma City, Oklahoma; Denver, Colorado; and Sioux Falls, South Dakota. A recent study found investment of $1 million in cultural tourism generated approximately $83,000 in state and local taxes, and provided support for hundreds of jobs for the metropolitan area, which in turn led to additional tax revenue for government.

== Arts and culture ==
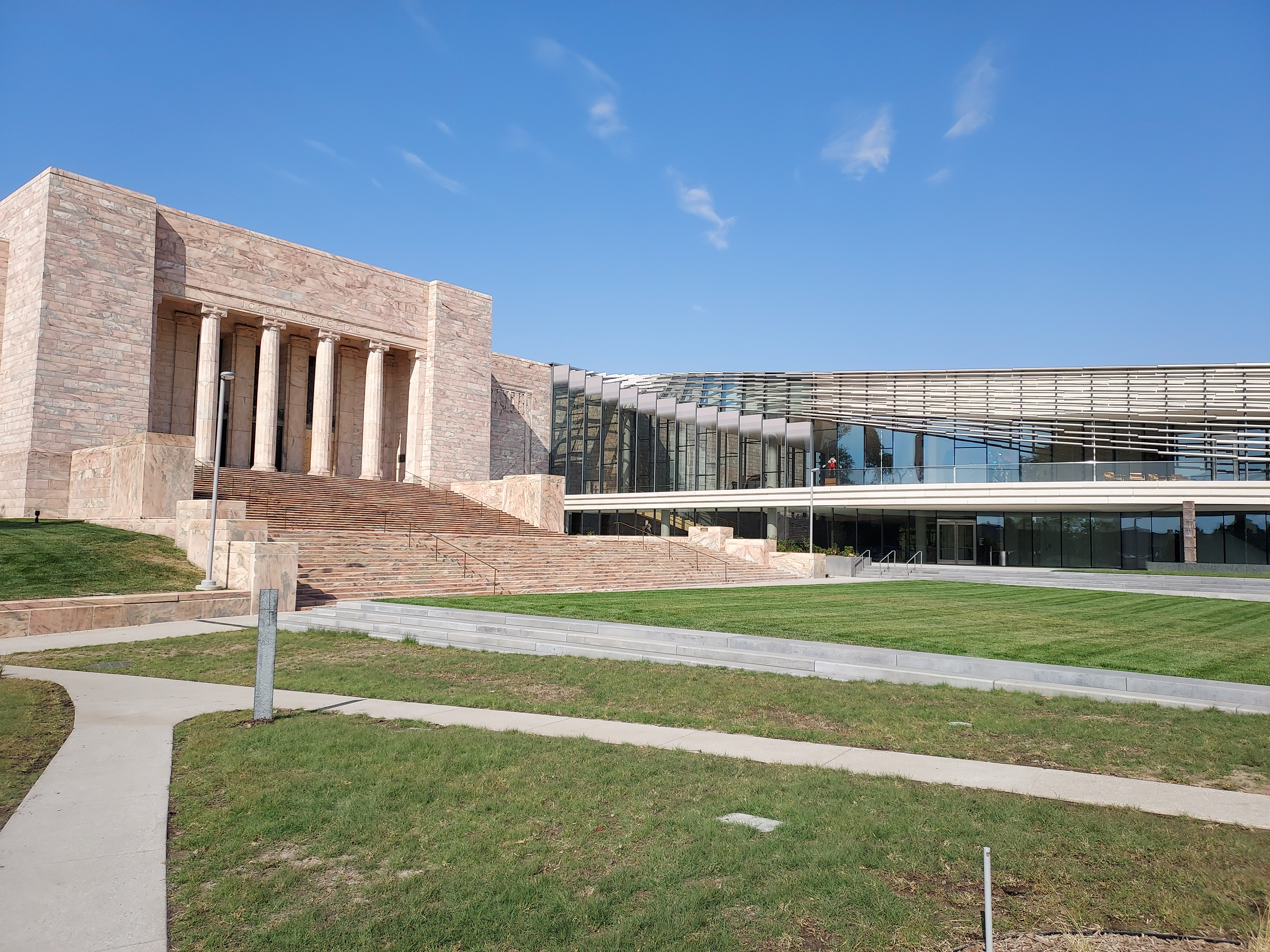
Joslyn Art Museum

Several national newspapers, including the Boston Globe and The New York Times have lauded Omaha's historical and cultural attractions.

The city is home to the Omaha Community Playhouse, the largest community theater in the United States. The Omaha Symphony Orchestra and its modern Holland Performing Arts Center, the Opera Omaha at the Orpheum theater, the Blue Barn Theatre, American Midwest Ballet, and The Rose Theater form the backbone of Omaha's performing arts community. Opened in 1931, the Joslyn Art Museum has large art collections. Since its inception in 1976, Omaha Children's Museum has been a place where children can challenge themselves, discover how the world works and learn through play. The Bemis Center for Contemporary Arts, one of the nation's premier urban artist colonies, was founded in Omaha in 1981, and the Durham Museum is accredited with the Smithsonian Institution for traveling exhibits. The city is also home to the largest singly funded mural in the nation, "Fertile Ground", by Meg Saligman. The annual Omaha Blues, Jazz, & Gospel Festival celebrates local music along with the Omaha Black Music Hall of Fame.

In 1955, Omaha's Union Stockyards overtook Chicago's stockyards as the United States' meat packing center. This legacy is reflected in the cuisine of Omaha, with renowned steakhouses such as Gorat's and the recently closed Mister C's, as well as the retail chain Omaha Steaks.

=== Henry Doorly Zoo ===
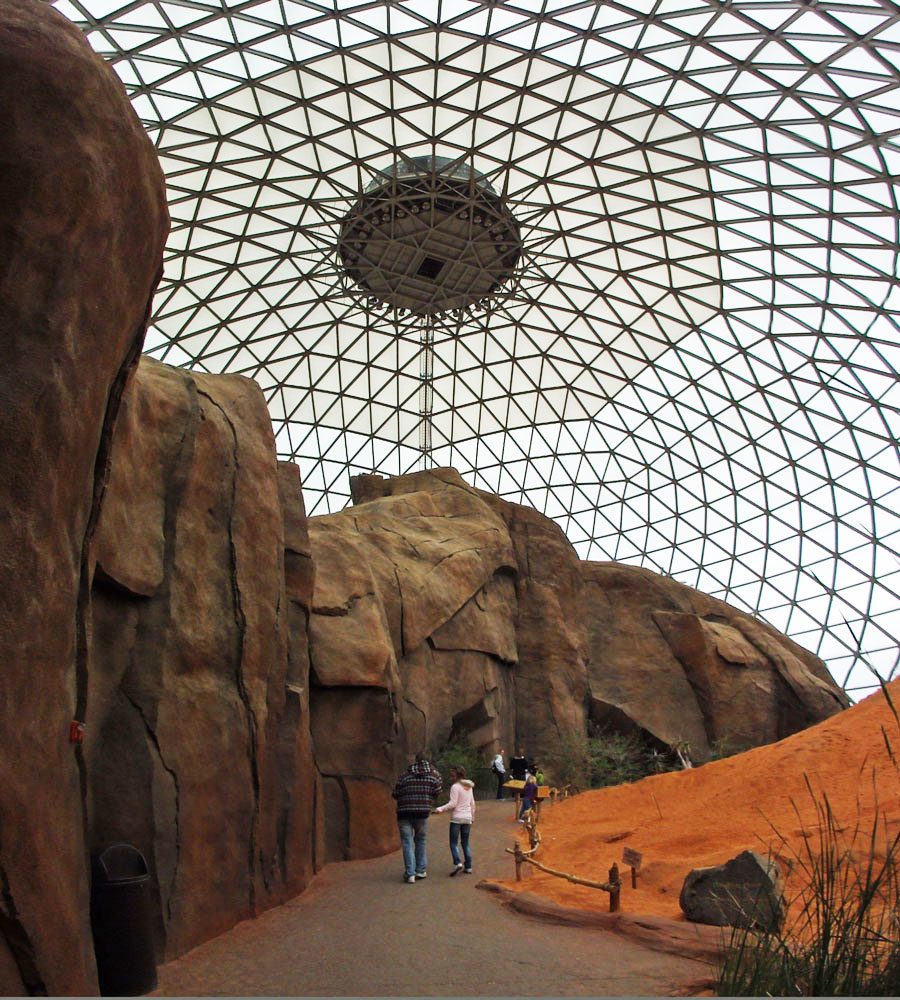
Desert Dome at Henry Doorly Zoo and Aquarium

The Henry Doorly Zoo is widely considered a premier zoo. The zoo is home to the world's largest nocturnal exhibit and indoor swamp; the world's largest indoor rainforest, the world's largest indoor desert, and the largest geodesic dome in the world (13 stories tall). The zoo is Nebraska's number-one paid attendance attraction and has welcomed more than 25 million visitors over the past 40 years.

=== Old Market ===
The Old Market is a major historic district in Downtown Omaha listed on the National Register of Historical Places. Today, its warehouses and other buildings house shops, restaurants, bars, coffee shops, and art galleries. Downtown is also the location of the Omaha Rail and Commerce Historic District, which has several art galleries and restaurants. Lauritzen Gardens features 100 acres (40 ha) with a variety of landscaping, and the new Kenefick Park recognizes Union Pacific Railroad's long history in Omaha. North Omaha has several historical cultural attractions including the Dreamland Historical Project, Love's Jazz and Art Center, and the John Beasley Theater. The annual River City Roundup is celebrated at Fort Omaha, and the neighborhood of Florence celebrates its history during "Florence Days". Native Omaha Days is a biennial event celebrating Near North Side heritage.

=== Religion ===
Religious institutions reflect the city's heritage. The city's Christian community has several historical churches dating from the founding of the city. There are also all sizes of congregations, including small, medium and megachurches. Omaha hosts the only Church of Jesus Christ of Latter-day Saints temple in Nebraska along with a large Jewish community. There are 152 parishes in the Roman Catholic Archdiocese of Omaha, and several Eastern Orthodox congregations throughout the city.

=== Lauritzen Gardens ===
Lauritzen Gardens is a botanical garden located near South Omaha. The garden contains several large greenhouses, and outdoor plant exhibits. Covering over 100 acres of land, Lauritzen Gardens welcomes over 200,000 guests annually, making it one of the most popular attractions in Omaha.

=== Music ===
Omaha's rich history in rhythm and blues, and jazz gave rise to a number of influential bands, including Anna Mae Winburn's Cotton Club Boys and Lloyd Hunter's Seranaders. Rock and roll pioneer Wynonie Harris, jazz great Preston Love, drummer Buddy Miles, and Luigi Waites are among the city's homegrown talent. Doug Ingle from the late 1960s band Iron Butterfly was born in Omaha, as was indie folk singer-songwriter Elliott Smith, though both were raised elsewhere. Musical theater star Andrew Rannells was also born in Omaha and is known amongst his fans for mentioning it in most of his interviews.

Today, the diverse culture of Omaha includes a variety of performance venues, museums, and musical heritage, including the historically significant jazz scene in North Omaha and the modern and influential "Omaha Sound".

Contemporary music groups either in or originally from Omaha include Mannheim Steamroller, Bright Eyes, The Faint, Cursive, Azure Ray, Tilly and the Wall, and 311. During the late 1990s, Omaha became nationally known as the birthplace of Saddle Creek Records, and the subsequent "Omaha Sound" was born from their bands' collective style.

Omaha also has a fledgling hip hop scene. Long-time bastion Houston Alexander, a one-time graffiti artist and professional Mixed Martial Arts competitor, is a local hip-hop radio show host. Cerone Thompson, known as Scrybe, had a number one hit on college radio stations across the United States. He also had number one hits, "Lose Control" and "Do What U Do", on the local hip hop station. Other notable artists include Stylo of Mastered Trax Latino who holds a strong following in South Omaha and Mexico / Latin America.

Many ethnic and cultural bands have come from Omaha. The Omaha Black Music Hall of Fame celebrates the city's long history of African-American music and the Strathdon Caledonia Pipe Band carries on a Scottish legacy. Internationally renowned composer Antonín Dvořák wrote his Ninth ("New World") Symphony in 1893 based on his impressions of the region after visiting Omaha's robust Czech community. In the period surrounding World War I Valentin J. Peter encouraged Germans in Omaha to celebrate their rich musical heritage, too. Frederick Metz, Gottlieb Storz and Frederick Krug were influential brewers whose beer gardens kept many German bands active.

=== Landmark preservation ===
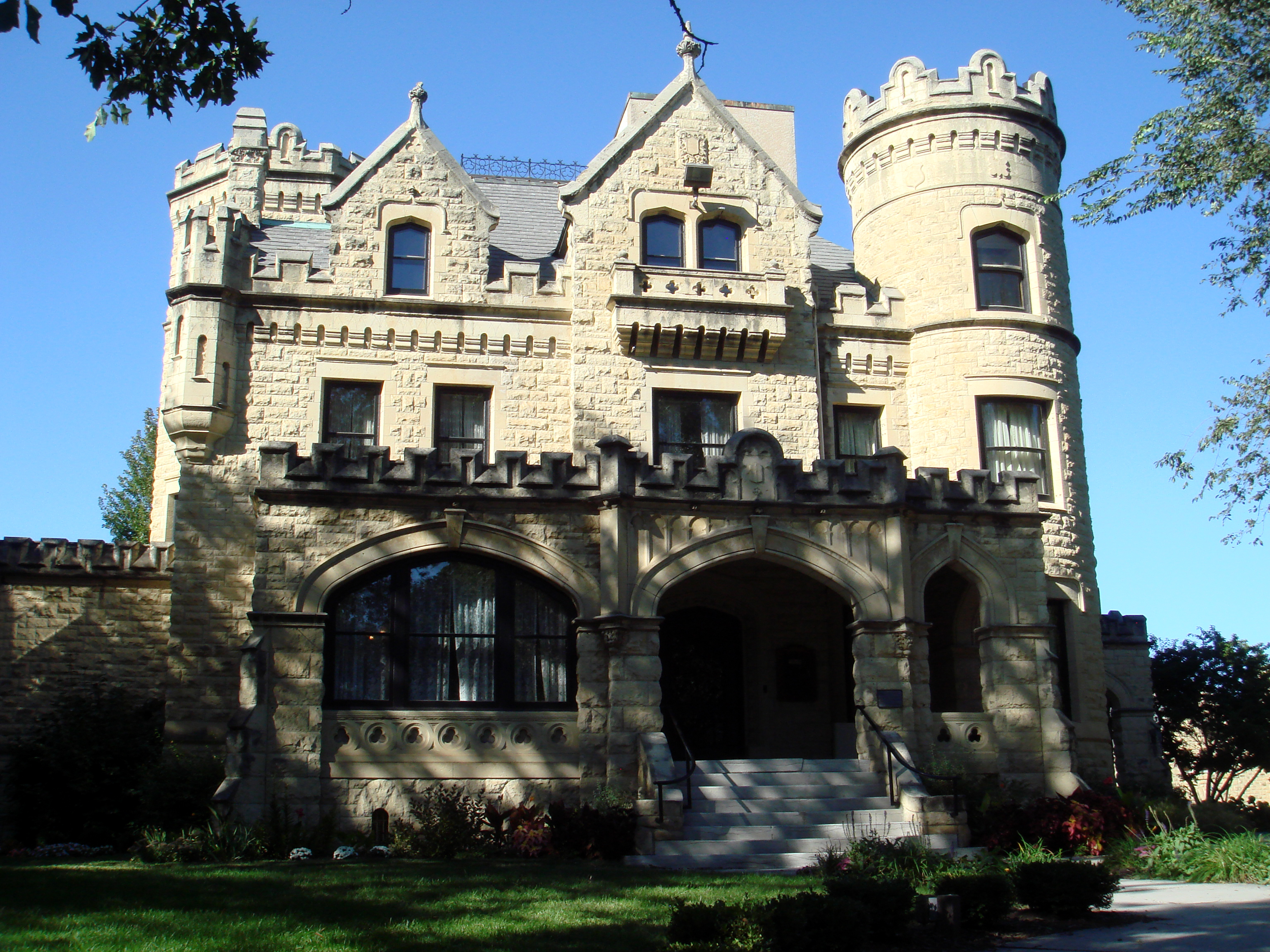
Joslyn Castle

Omaha is home to dozens of nationally, regionally and locally significant landmarks. The city has more than a dozen historic districts, including Fort Omaha Historic District, Gold Coast Historic District, Omaha Quartermaster Depot Historic District, Field Club Historic District, Bemis Park Historic District, and the South Omaha Main Street Historic District. Omaha is notorious for its 1989 demolition of 24 buildings in the Jobbers Canyon Historic District, which represents to date the largest loss of buildings on the National Register. The only original building surviving of that complex is the Nash Block.

Omaha has almost one hundred individual properties listed on the National Register of Historic Places, including the Bank of Florence, Holy Family Church, the Christian Specht Building and the Joslyn Castle. There are also three properties designated as National Historic Landmarks.

Locally designated landmarks, including residential, commercial, religious, educational, agricultural and socially significant locations across the city, honor Omaha's cultural legacy and important history. The City of Omaha Landmarks Heritage Preservation Commission is the government body that works with the mayor of Omaha and the Omaha City Council to protect historic places. Important history organizations in the community include the Douglas County Historical Society.

Built in 1962, Omaha's Cinerama was called Indian Hills Theater. Its demolition in 2001 by the Nebraska Methodist Health System was unpopular, with objections from local historical and cultural groups and luminaries from around the world. The Dundee Theatre is the lone surviving single-screen movie theater in Omaha and still shows films. A recent development to the Omaha film scene was the addition of Film Streams's Ruth Sokolof Theater in North Downtown. The two-screen theater is part of the Slowdown facility. It features American independents, foreign films, documentaries, classics, themed series, and director retrospectives. In addition to the five Douglas Theatres venues in Omaha, two more are opening, including Midtown Crossing Theatres, on 32nd and Farnam Streets near the Mutual of Omaha Building. Westroads Mall has a modern multiplex movie theater with 14 screens, operated by Rave Cinemas.

== Sports ==
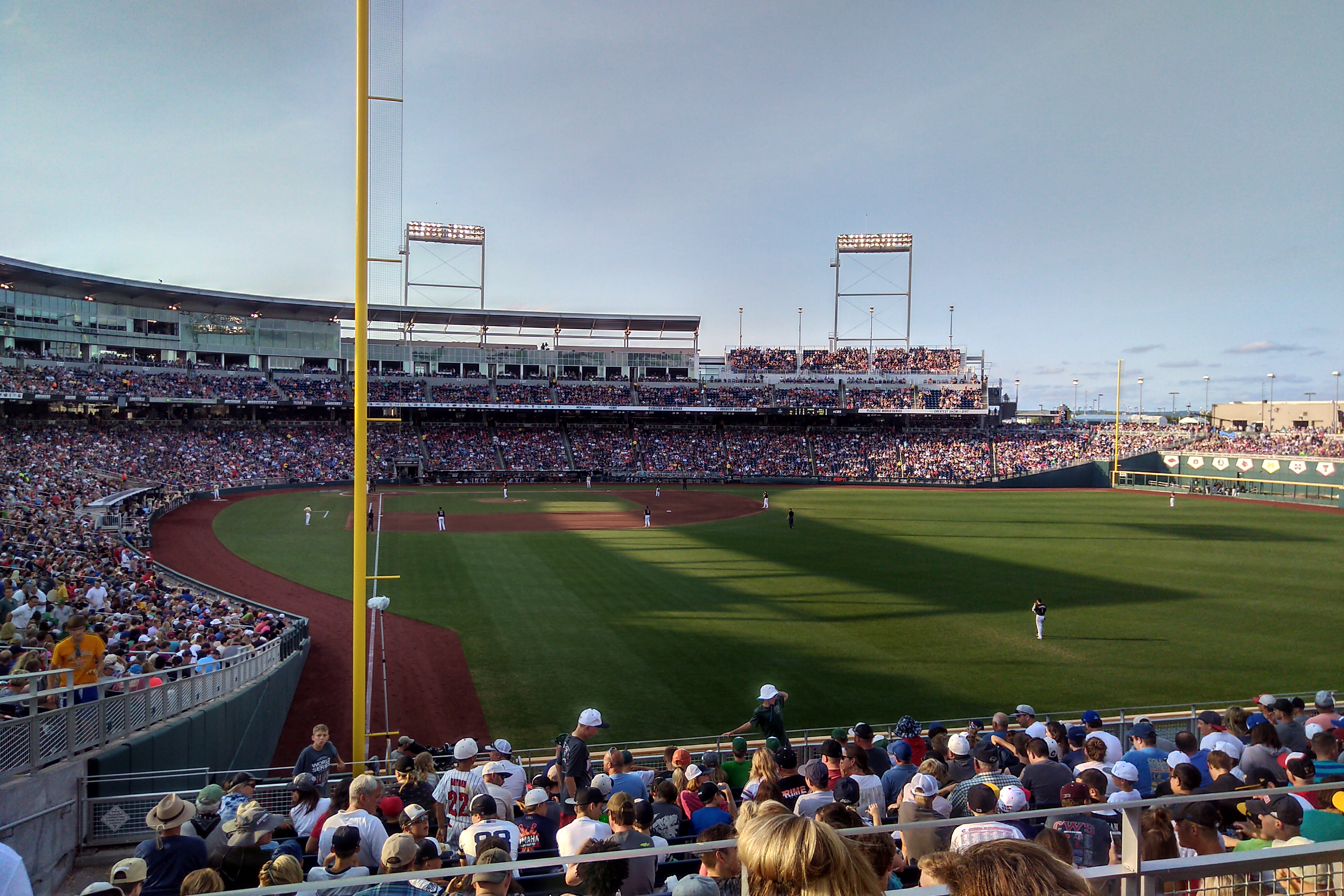
Charles Schwab Field

Sports have been important in Omaha for more than a century, and the city plays host to three minor-league professional sports teams.

Omaha has hosted the annual June NCAA College World Series men's baseball tournament since 1950. It has been played at the downtown Charles Schwab Field since 2011.

The Omaha Sports Commission is a quasi-governmental nonprofit organization that coordinates much of the professional and amateur athletic activity in the city, including the 2008, 2012 and 2016 US Olympic Swimming Team Trials and the building of a new stadium in North Downtown. The University of Nebraska–Lincoln and the Commission co-hosted the 2008 National Collegiate Athletic Association (NCAA) Division One Women's Volleyball Championship in December of that year. The 2016 Big Ten baseball tournament championship was also played at the College World Series Stadium. Another quasi-governmental board, the Metropolitan Entertainment and Convention Authority (MECA), was created by city voters in 2000, and is responsible for maintaining the CHI Health Center Omaha (formerly CenturyLink Center Omaha).

Sports teams in Omaha
Team	Sport	League	Venue (capacity)	Average attendance
Creighton Bluejays baseball	Baseball	NCAA	Charles Schwab Field (24,505)	3,205
Creighton Bluejays men's basketball	Basketball	NCAA	CHI Health Center Omaha (18,560)	17,048
Omaha Mavericks men's ice hockey	Ice hockey	NCAA	Baxter Arena (7,898)	6,570
Omaha Mavericks men's basketball	Basketball	NCAA	Baxter Arena (7,898)	2,366
Omaha Storm Chasers	Baseball	International League	Werner Park (9,023)	5,315
Omaha Lancers	Ice hockey	United States Hockey League	Liberty First Credit Union Arena (4,000)	3,302
Omaha Beef	Arena football	National Arena League	Liberty First Credit Union Arena (3,626)	3,302
Creighton Bluejays men's soccer	Soccer	NCAA	Morrison Stadium (6,000)	3,297
Omaha Lancers	Soccer	USASA	TBD	—
Union Omaha	Soccer	USL League One	Werner Park (9,023)	—
Omaha Supernovas	Volleyball	Major League Volleyball	CHI Health Center Omaha (18,560)	9,656
LOVB Nebraska	Volleyball	LOVB Pro	Baxter Arena (7,898), Eihusen Arena (6,000), Liberty First Credit Union Arena (4,600)	—

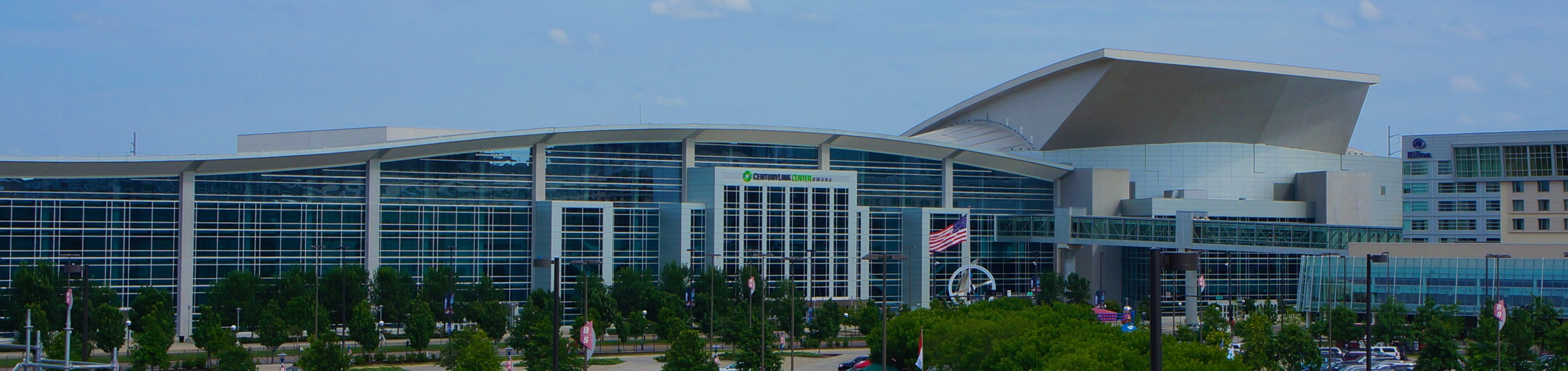
CHI Health Center

The Omaha Storm Chasers play at Werner Park. They won seven championships (in 1969, 1970, 1978, 1990, 2011, 2013, and 2014). Omaha is also home to the Omaha Diamond Spirit, a collegiate summer baseball team that plays in the MINK league.

The Omaha Supernovas are a professional indoor volleyball team based in Omaha, Nebraska. The team competes in the Pro Volleyball Federation (PVF). The Supernovas began play in the league's inaugural 2024 season. The team plays its home games at CHI Health Center Omaha. The Supernovas won the inaugural championship in May 2024. During its championship run in the inaugural PVF season, Omaha and the Supernovas became the league's shining star, hosting 134,969 fans across the 15 matches held at the CHI Health Center. That includes a whopping 9,656 average mark for the 12 Supernovas' home matches, plus the 19,094 spectators who attended the PVF Semifinals and Championship. The Supernovas' 9,656 attendance match average has been the No. 1 mark amongst professional volleyball teams in the world. The team set a record with 12,090 spectators packing into the CHI Health Center to see the Supernovas beat the Orlando Valkyries in four sets.

Union Omaha, a professional minor league soccer team, is a member of USL League One and began play in the 2020 season. Their home games are played at Werner Park, which it shares with the Storm Chasers. The team, nicknamed the Owls, won the league championship in 2021. Union then made a deep run to the quarterfinals of the 2022 U.S. Open Cup, defeating two Major League Soccer teams in the process. The team announced plans in 2024 to build a 7,000-seat soccer-specific stadium near Downtown Omaha.

The Creighton University Bluejays compete in a number of NCAA Division I sports as members of the Big East Conference. The Bluejays play baseball at Charles Schwab Field, soccer at Morrison Stadium, and basketball at the 18,000 seat CHI Health Center Omaha. The Jays annually rank in the top 15 in attendance each year, averaging more than 16,000 people per game.

The Omaha Mavericks, representing the University of Nebraska Omaha (UNO), also play basketball, baseball and soccer in NCAA Division I as members of The Summit League. The UNO men's ice hockey team plays in the National Collegiate Hockey Conference. The Mavericks play in the on-campus Baxter Arena.

Ice hockey is another popular spectator sport in Omaha. The Omaha Lancers, a United States Hockey League team, play at the Ralston Arena.

Omaha was home to an expansion team, the Nighthawks, in the United Football League from 2010 to 2011. The Omaha Beef indoor football team played at the Omaha Civic Auditorium until 2012 when they moved to the new Ralston Arena.

Omaha was a notable cadence term of Pro Football Hall of Fame quarterback Peyton Manning during his 18-year playing career used to indicate a change of playcall. In 2021, he launched Omaha Productions.

The Kansas City-Omaha Kings, an NBA franchise, played in both cities from 1972 to 1978, before decamping solely to Kansas City until 1985, when the team moved to its current home of Sacramento, California.

The Cox Classic golf tournament was part of the Web.com Tour from 1996 to 2013. The circuit returned to Omaha in 2017 with the Pinnacle Bank Championship.

== Parks and recreation ==
Omaha has a thriving running community and many miles of paved running and biking trails throughout the city and surrounding communities. The Omaha Marathon involves a half-marathon and a 10 km (6.2 mi) race that takes place annually in September. Omaha also has a history of curling, including multiple junior national champions.

The city's historic boulevards were originally designed by Horace Cleveland in 1889 to work with the parks to create a seamless flow of trees, grass and flowers throughout the city. Florence Boulevard and Fontenelle Boulevard are among the remnants of this system. Omaha boasts more than 80 mi (129 km) of trails for pedestrians, bicyclists and hikers. They include the American Discovery Trail, which traverses the entire United States, and the Lewis and Clark National Historic Trail passes through Omaha as it travels 3,700 mi (5,950 km) westward from Illinois to Oregon. Trails throughout the area are included in comprehensive plans for the city of Omaha, the Omaha metropolitan area, Douglas County, and long-distance coordinated plans between the municipalities of southeast Nebraska. The city also has a park dedicated to pollinating bees and insects called 'Pacific Preserve'

== Government ==
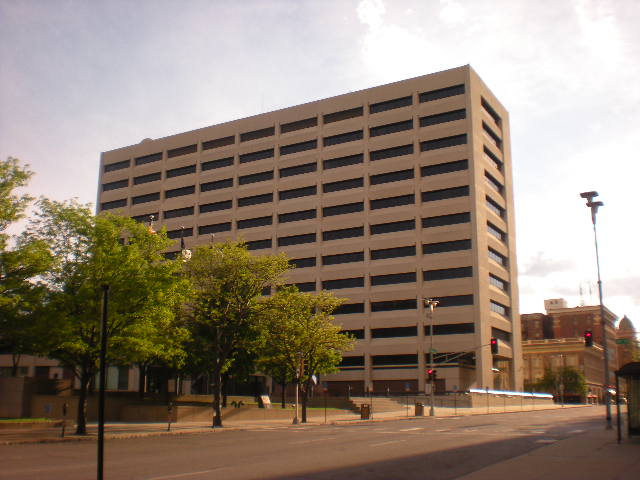
City Building in Downtown Omaha

Omaha has a strong mayor form of government, along with a city council elected from seven districts across the city. The mayor is John Ewing Jr., who was elected in May 2025. The longest-serving mayor in Omaha's history was "Cowboy" Jim Dahlman, who served 20 years over eight terms. He was regarded as the "wettest mayor in America" because of the flourishing number of bars in Omaha during his tenure. Dahlman was a close associate of political boss Tom Dennison. During Dahlman's tenure, the city switched from its original strong-mayor form of government to a city commission government. In 1956, the city switched back.

The city clerk is Elizabeth Butler. The City of Omaha administers twelve departments, including finance, police, human rights, libraries and planning. The Omaha City Council is the legislative branch and has seven members elected from districts across the city. The council enacts local ordinances and approves the city budget. Government priorities and activities are established in a budget ordinance approved annually. The council takes official action through the passage of ordinances and resolutions. Nebraska's constitution grants the option of home rule to cities with more than 5,000 residents, meaning they may operate under their own charters. Omaha is one of only three cities in Nebraska to use this option, out of 17 eligible. The City of Omaha is considering consolidating with Douglas County government.

Although registered Republicans outnumbered Democrats in the 2nd congressional district, which includes Omaha, Democratic presidential candidate Barack Obama opened three campaign offices in the city with 15 staff members to cover the state in fall 2008. Mike Fahey, the Democratic mayor of Omaha, said he would do whatever it took to deliver the district's electoral vote to Obama; and the Obama campaign considered the district "in play". Former Nebraska U.S. Senator Bob Kerrey and then-U.S. Senator Ben Nelson campaigned in the city for Obama, and in November 2008 Obama won the district's electoral vote. This was a historic win, as Obama became the first Democratic presidential candidate to win an electoral vote in Nebraska since 1964, only made possible by Nebraska's split electoral vote system.

In 2011, Nebraska lawmakers moved Offutt Air Force Base and the town of Bellevue—an area with a large minority population—out of the Omaha-based 2nd district and shifted in the Republican-heavy Omaha suburbs in Sarpy County. The move is expected to dilute the city's urban Democratic vote.

The 2nd district sent its single electoral vote for Joe Biden in the 2020 election. Biden's victory, by more than 20,000 votes, shows Omaha's and the 2nd district's continuing trend toward Democratic politics in recent years.

== Education ==
=== Primary and secondary education ===
Omaha has many public and private educational institutions, including Omaha Public Schools, the largest public school district in Nebraska, which serves more than 47,750 students in more than 75 schools. After a contentious period of uncertainty, in 2007 the Nebraska Legislature approved a plan to create a learning community for Omaha-area school districts with a central administrative board.

The Westside Community Schools, also known as District 66, is a district in the heart of Omaha. It serves students in pre-kindergarten through the 12th grade and recorded a district enrollment of 6,123 students K–12 for the 2015–16 school year. Through annexations Omaha also has the Millard Public Schools and Elkhorn Public Schools. Omaha is also home to Brownell-Talbot School, Nebraska's only preschool through grade 12, independent college preparatory school.

The Roman Catholic Archdiocese of Omaha operates numerous private Catholic schools with 21,500 students in 32 elementary schools and nine high schools. They include St. Cecilia Grade School in Midtown Omaha, Holy Cross in Morton Meadows, St. Robert Bellarmine School at 120th and Pacific Street, St. Stephen the Martyr School in Millard, and Creighton Preparatory School, all of which have received the U.S. Department of Education Blue Ribbon School award.

=== Higher education ===
There are eleven colleges and universities among Omaha's higher education institutions. The largest public school is University of Nebraska Omaha, which was founded in 1908 and is currently an NCAA Division I school with over 15,000 students. The University of Nebraska Medical Center in midtown Omaha is home to the Eppley Cancer Center, one of 66 designated Cancer Centers by the National Cancer Institute in the United States. The University of Nebraska College of Medicine is also on the UNMC campus.

Omaha's largest private university is Creighton University. It is a Jesuit institution that is ranked the top non-doctoral regional university in the Midwestern United States. Its campus is just outside Downtown Omaha in the new North Downtown district. The university has a combined 6,700 students in its undergraduate, graduate, medical, and law schools.

Omaha is also home to a number of smaller colleges and universities. Clarkson College is a small private college focusing on health sciences and affiliated with the Episcopal Church. Nebraska Methodist College is a small private school focusing on health careers and education. The College of Saint Mary is a Catholic woman's school known for its healthcare offerings. Bellevue University is a mid-size private university. Doane University is the oldest private university in Nebraska, with campuses in Crete and Lincoln. Its residential campus is in Crete with a smaller campus in Omaha.

== Media ==
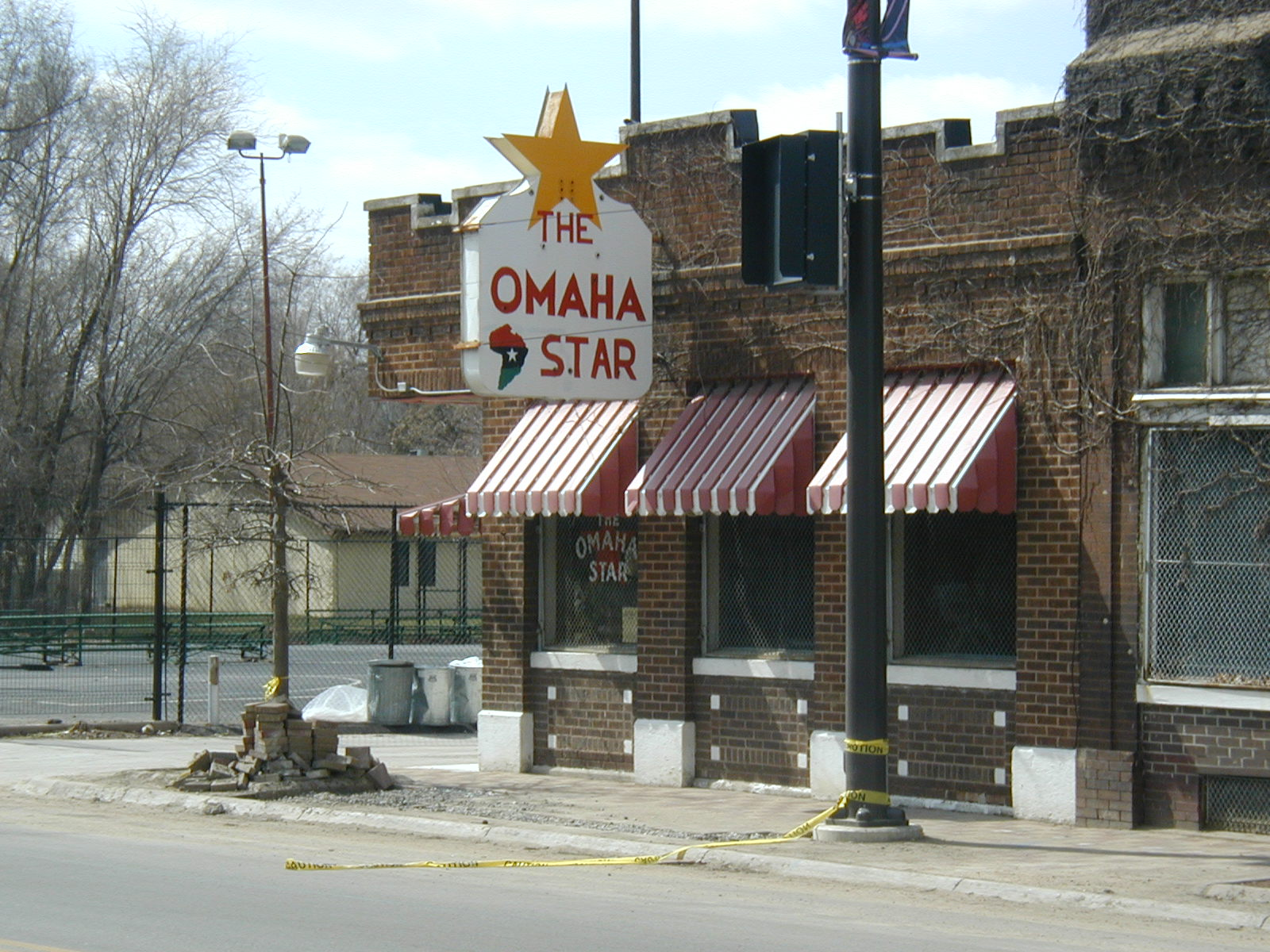
The Omaha Star building is listed on the National Register of Historic Places.

The city is the focus of the Omaha designated market area, and is the 76th largest in the United States.

=== Magazines ===
Omaha Magazine

=== Newspapers ===
The major daily newspaper in Nebraska is the Omaha World-Herald, formerly the largest employee-owned newspaper in the United States. Weeklies in the city include the Midlands Business Journal (weekly business publication); American Classifieds (formerly Thrifty Nickel), a weekly classified newspaper; The Reader, as well as The Omaha Star. Founded in 1938 in North Omaha, the Star is Nebraska's only African-American newspaper.

=== Television stations and cable TV ===
Omaha's three television news stations include: KETV 7 (ABC- branded NewsWatch 7), KMTV-TV 3 (CBS- branded 3 News Now), and WOWT 6 (NBC Omaha). KPTM 42 (FOX 42/CW 15) and KXVO 15 (TBD) do not air local news content. Cox Communications provides cable television services throughout the metropolitan area. Prism TV, offered through CenturyLink, is a broadband TV option also available throughout the Omaha area. Satellite providers such as DirecTV and Dish Network and the local programming they offer are also available throughout the metropolitan area.

== Infrastructure ==
Omaha's growth has required the constant development of new urban infrastructure that influence, allow and encourage the constant expansion of the city.

=== Utilities ===
Retail natural gas and water public utilities in Omaha are provided by the Metropolitan Utilities District. Nebraska is the only public power state in the nation. All electric utilities are non-profit and customer-owned. Electricity in the city is provided by the Omaha Public Power District. Public housing is governed by the Omaha Housing Authority. Metro Area Transit provides public transportation. CenturyLink and Cox provide local telephone and internet services. The City of Omaha maintains two modern sewage treatment plants.

Portions of the Enron corporation began as Northern Natural Gas Company in Omaha. Northern provides three natural gas lines to Omaha. Enron formerly owned UtiliCorp United, Inc., which became Aquila, Inc. Peoples Natural Gas, a division of Aquila, Inc., serves several surrounding communities around the Omaha metropolitan area, including Plattsmouth.

=== Health care ===
There are several hospitals in Omaha. Research hospitals include the Boys Town National Research Hospital, the University of Nebraska Medical Center and the Creighton University Medical Center. The Boys Town facility is well known for hearing-related research and treatment. The University of Nebraska Medical Center hosts the Eppley Institute for Research in Cancer and Allied Diseases, a world-renowned cancer treatment facility named in honor of Omahan Eugene Eppley.

=== Transportation ===
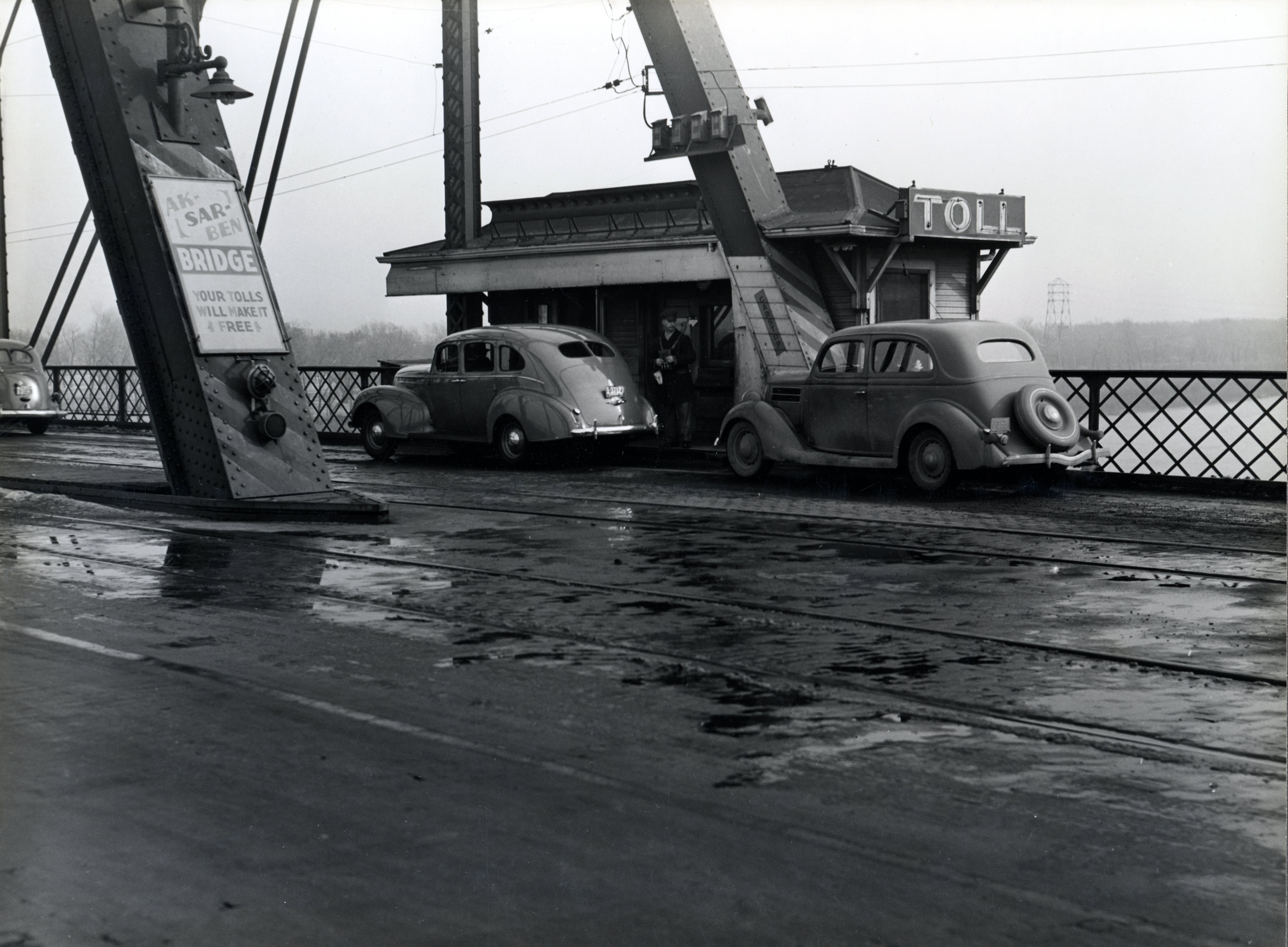
Ak-Sar-Ben Bridge toll booth in 1938

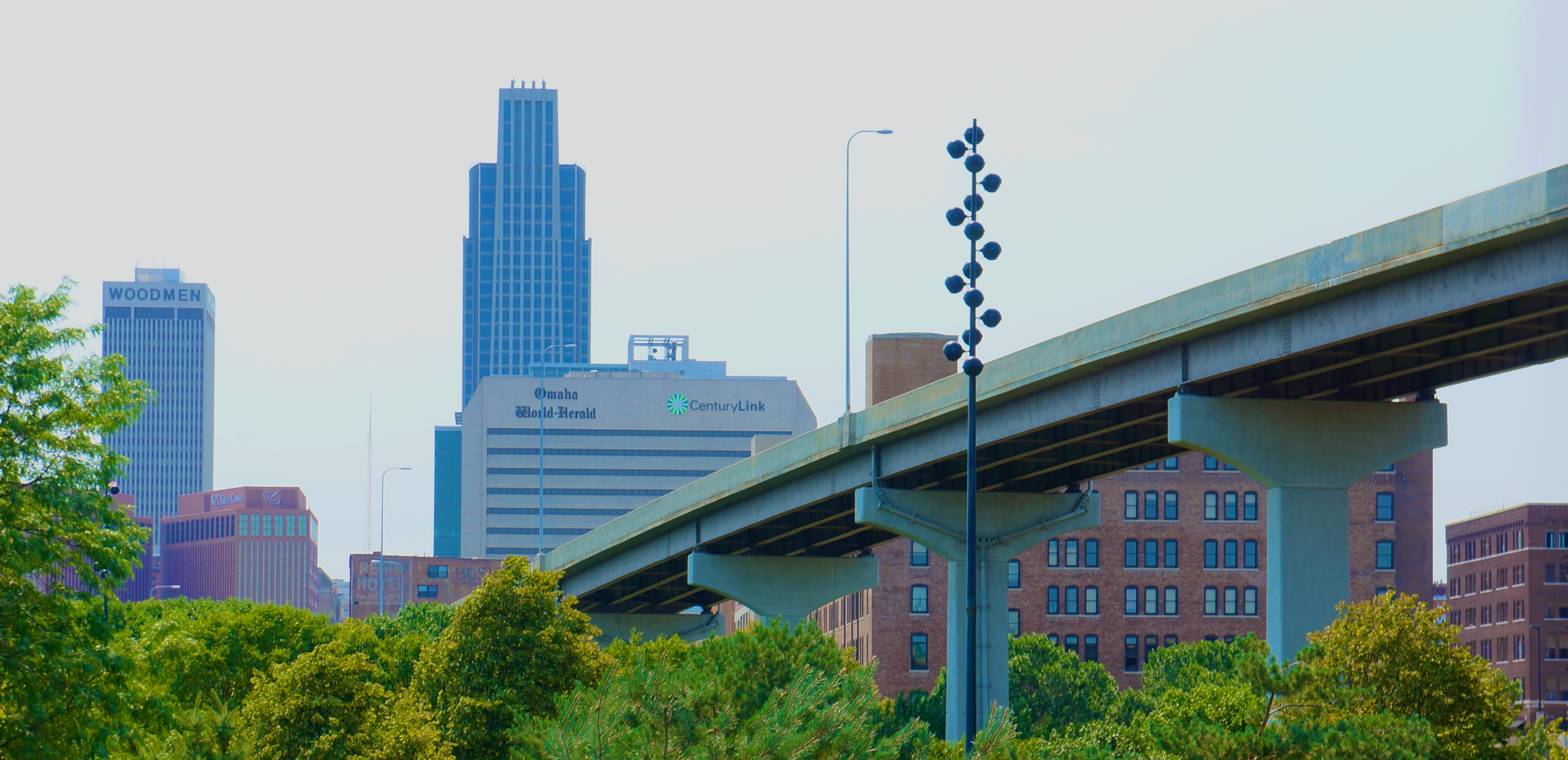
Interstate 480 leaving Omaha

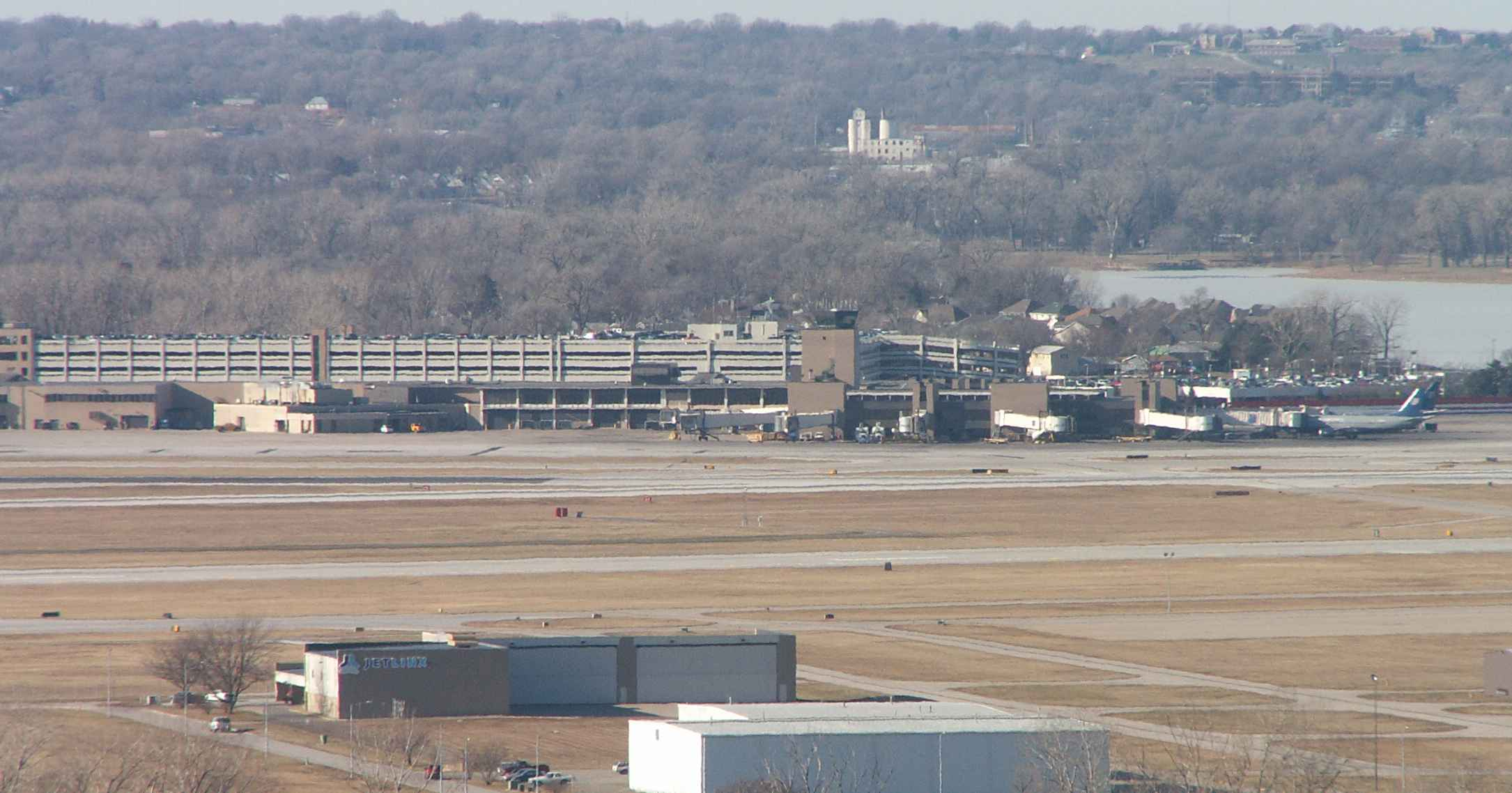
Omaha's Eppley Airfield in East Omaha

Omaha's central role in the history of transportation across America earned it the nickname "Gate City of the West". Despite President Lincoln's decree that Council Bluffs, Iowa, be the starting point for the Union Pacific Railroad, construction began from Omaha on the eastern portion of the first transcontinental railroad. By the middle of the 20th century, nearly every major railroad served Omaha.

Today, the Omaha Rail and Commerce Historic District celebrates this connection, along with the listing of the Burlington Train Station and the Union Station on the National Register of Historic Places. First housed in the former Herndon House, the Union Pacific Railroad's corporate headquarters have been in Omaha since the company began. Their new headquarters, the Union Pacific Center, opened in Downtown Omaha in 2004.

Amtrak, the national passenger rail system, provides service through Omaha, with the California Zephyr serving Omaha station once daily in each direction. The intercity bus terminal is at 1601 Jackson St. in downtown Omaha. The terminal also service to Jefferson Lines, Burlington Trailways, and Express Arrow. Metro Transit, previously known as Metro Area Transit, is the local bus system.

Omaha's position as a transportation center was finalized with the 1872 opening of the Union Pacific Missouri River Bridge that linked the transcontinental railroad to the railroads terminating in Council Bluffs. In 1888, the first road bridge, the Douglas Street Bridge, opened. In the 1890s, the Illinois Central drawbridge opened as the largest bridge of its type in the world. Omaha's Missouri River road bridges are now entering their second generation, including the Works Progress Administration-financed South Omaha Bridge, now called Veteran's Memorial Bridge, which was added to the National Register of Historic Places. In 2006, Omaha and Council Bluffs announced joint plans to build the Missouri River Pedestrian Bridge, which opened in 2008.

The primary mode of transportation in Omaha is by automobile, with I-80, I-480, I-680, I-29, and U.S. Route 75 (JFK Freeway and North Freeway) providing freeway service across the metropolitan area. The expressway along West Dodge Road (U.S. Route 6 and Nebraska Link 28B) and U.S. Route 275 has been upgraded to freeway standards from I-680 to Fremont. City-owned Metro Transit, formerly MAT Metro Area Transit, provides public bus service to hundreds of locations throughout the Metro.

A 2017 study by Walk Score ranked Omaha 26th-most-walkable of the fifty largest U.S. cities. Of the top 50 most walkable cities, only Omaha saw its Walk Score decline from the previous year. There is an extensive trail system throughout the city for walkers, runners, bicyclists, and other pedestrian modes of transportation.

Omaha is laid out on a grid plan, with 12 blocks to the mile with a north-to-south house numbering system. Omaha is the location of a historic boulevard system designed by H.W.S. Cleveland who sought to combine the beauty of parks with the pleasure of driving cars. The historic Florence and Fontenelle Boulevards, as well as the modern Sorenson Parkway, are important elements in this system. The City of Omaha has proposed the Omaha Streetcar through the city's urban core, with proposed extensions to Council Bluffs, Iowa, Eppley Airfield, North Omaha, West Omaha, and Bellevue, Nebraska.

Eppley Airfield, Omaha's airport, serves the region with over 5 million passengers in 2018. United Airlines, Southwest Airlines, Delta Air Lines, American Airlines, Alaska Airlines, Allegiant Air, Frontier Airlines, and Sun Country Airlines serve the airport with direct and connecting service. As of 2018, the airport has non-stop service to 34 destinations. General aviation airports that serve the area include the Millard Municipal Airport, North Omaha Airport and the Council Bluffs Airport. Offutt Air Force Base continues to serve as a military airbase; it is at the southern edge of Bellevue, which in turn lies immediately south of Omaha.

== Sister cities ==
Omaha has nine sister cities:

- Shizuoka, Japan (1965)
- Braunschweig, Lower Saxony, Germany (1992)
- Šiauliai, Lithuania (1996)
- Naas, County Kildare, Ireland (2002)
- Xalapa, Veracruz, Mexico (2005)
- Yantai, Shandong, China (2010)
- Isigny-Omaha, France (2023)
- Carlentini, Sicily, Italy (2024)
- Jamestown, Accra, Ghana (2025)

== See also ==
- Benson neighborhood (Omaha, Nebraska)
- Economy of Omaha, Nebraska
- Dundee-Happy Hollow Historic District
- Florence, Nebraska
- Gold Coast Historic District (Omaha, Nebraska)
- History of Omaha
- Midtown Omaha
- Millard, Omaha, Nebraska
- North Omaha, Nebraska
- Old Market (Omaha, Nebraska)
- Omaha Coalition of Citizen Patrols
- South Omaha, Nebraska
- USS Omaha, 4 ships
