= Crime in Omaha, Nebraska =

Crime rates (2010) (Population of 464,628)
Crime type	Rate
Homicide	7.3
Forcible rape	41.8
Robbery	155.6
Aggravated assault	282.4
Violent crime	487.1
Burglary	655.6
Larceny-theft	2,602.3
Motor vehicle theft	472.9
Property crime	3,730.7
Crime rates per 100,000 persons Source: FBI 2010 UCR data: Compare with other cities?

Crime in Omaha, Nebraska has varied widely, ranging from Omaha's early years as a frontier town with typically widespread gambling and prostitution, to civic expectation of higher standards as the city grew, and contemporary concerns about violent crimes related to gangs and dysfunctions of persistent unemployment, poverty and lack of education among some residents.

As a major industrial city into the mid-20th century, Omaha shared in social tensions of larger cities that accompanied rapid growth and many new immigrants and migrants. By mid-century Omaha was a center for illicit betting, while experiencing dramatic job losses and unemployment because of dramatic restructuring of the railroads and the meatpacking industry, as well as other sectors. Persistent poverty resulting from discrimination and job loss generated different crimes in the late 20th century, with drug trade and drug abuse becoming associated with violent crime rates, which climbed after 1986 as Los Angeles gangs made affiliates in the city. With the nationally famous kidnapping of Edward Cudahy, Jr. in 1900 and the subsequent acquittal of the accused kidnapper, Pat Crowe, The Washington Post wrote, "Omaha is evidently a happy hunting ground for savages and malefactors."

Since the 1990s crime has been reduced for the city overall. According to crime statistics released by the FBI, Omaha's rate of violent crimes per 100,000 residents has been lower than the average rates of three dozen cities of similar size. Omaha's rate of violent crime was 601.1 in 2005, compared to 995.6 for cities with populations from 250,000 to 500,000. Unlike Omaha, violent crime overall for those cities has trended upward since 2003. Rates for property crime have decreased for both Omaha and its peer cities during the same time period. In 2006 Omaha was ranked for homicides as 46th out of the 72 cities in the United States of more than 250,000 in population, making it quite a safe city for most inhabitants.

== History ==
=== 19th century ===
Omaha had an early history as a "wide-open town" where prostitution, gambling, drugs and alcohol were accepted. There were no official law-enforcement officers until after the city was incorporated. On February 12, 1857, the city of Omaha was incorporated and in March J.A. Miller was appointed the city marshall. In March 1866, the city council enlarged the police force to four men. Prostitution was a brisk trade in early Omaha, and sex workers in the Burnt District numbered 1,500 by the 1870s.

In 1868, the city council created the position of "police judge" and appointed John H. Sahler. Later that year, the city council directed members of the force to provide themselves with "dark blue, single breasted coats, shirts and pants of the same material". They were required to have caps with a brass plate in the front marked City Police. Between 1869 and 1882 the size of the department fluctuated, reaching 14 officers in 1882. In 1884, Marshal Roger T. Guthrie was convicted and imprisoned for accepting a bribe.

Early years of land grabs by the Omaha Claim Club were thwarted by the 1857 trial of Baker v. Morton, where the United States Supreme Court ruled that Omaha's land barons could not claim up large amounts of land in order to sell them at exorbitant costs. This stopped homesteading in the area. While the common practice ended, early land grabs were fruitful. Lots in one of the early plots were subdivided to form Scriptown, where territorial legislators were awarded with land for keeping the controversial capital in Omaha.

Because of the lack of police force, in early years groups sometimes resorted to lynchings, as elements of the community enforced their own rough justice. Victims were likely to be outsiders, transient workers or laborers who did not live in the city, whom no one knew. In the west and south, victims were lynched for alleged crimes of property as well as of violence. In 1891 there was the first recorded lynching in Omaha of an African American. A mob lynched Joe Coe, also known as George Smith, a worker from Council Bluffs across the river. He had allegedly raped a white woman. No one was tried for Coe's murder.

At the start of the 20th century, Anna Wilson ran a high-class brothel in the Sporting District, the vice district run by political boss Tom Dennison. During the Trans-Mississippi Exposition of 1898, Ada Everleigh and her sister ran a high-class bordello to make a profit from the many visitors to the city. They closed their operation soon after the expo and moved to the larger environs of Chicago.

=== Notable 19th-century crimes in Omaha ===
There were several notable crimes in Omaha during its first 50 years. They included the murder of a federal clerk on November 4, 1881. After receiving several anonymous letters and postcards threatening his life because of his enforcement of the Slocumb Laws and state laws prohibiting Sunday liquor sales, Colonel W.B. Smith, Clerk of the United States Circuit and District Courts, was murdered in Omaha. On November 15, 1891, Nettie Birdler, a private in the Salvation Army, murdered Captain Haddie Smith during an international exposition of the army's troops, with representatives from across the United States and France present. The motive of the murder went unknown, as Birdler committed suicide immediately after shooting Smith.

Joe Coe, also known as George Smith, was a 50-year-old African-American railroad porter who was lynched by a mob on October 8, 1891. He was accused of raping a 14-year-old. Coe had an alibi and witnesses attesting to his innocence. Because he had been convicted of rape several years before in neighboring Council Bluffs, the mob decided he was guilty of this event. A crowd of 10,000 gathered for the lynching. Seven men were arrested for the crime, including the chief of police and a major businessman; however, after a mob gathered outside of the jail and threatened to destroy it in order to "liberate" the suspects, each of them were freed, and nobody was ever brought to trial for the lynching.

On June 11, 1895, James Ish murdered a man named Chappele after finding him in an embrace and kissing his wife. After he initially corroborated his wife's story confessing she killed Chappele when he attempted to abduct her, Ish later recanted and admitted his own guilt, confident a jury would not find him guilty. In another affair of the heart, on November 18, 1888, Eliza Beechler, the wife of Harry W. King, Jr., a merchant from Chicago, followed him to Omaha's Paxton Hotel where she suspected him of carrying on an affair. On her arrival he insisted she leave, and after escorting her to the hotel lobby she shot him several times, murdering him. It was later revealed that King had married three different women, including the one with whom he shared the room at the Paxton. The crime caused a sensation in Omaha, Chicago, where the King family was prominent at the time, and St. Louis, close to where the third wife was from.

On November 5, 1895, three men were held in suspicion of their involvement in the abduction and murder of an eleven-year-old girl. On April 14, 1899, Anton Inda, an Omaha policeman, was held for murder after an African American singer named J.A. Smith was murdered at the police station. Smith was killed when he was stabbed in the skull with a stilleto, and a witness was suspected to have been suppressed through intimidation.

In 1900 the city and country closely followed the kidnapping of 16-year-old Edward Cudahy Jr. After the boy's father, a meatpacking magnate, paid ransom, Edward Cudahy, Jr. was safely returned. Police and officials in Omaha and other cities were concerned that the payment of ransom would set an unfortunate precedent for other cases. Although the kidnappers were caught several years later, both were acquitted, in part because Nebraska did not have a statute relating directly to kidnapping. One of the kidnappers, Pat Crowe, became somewhat of a folk hero for this crime and robberies, even appearing as a speaker about them.

=== Tom Dennison's political machine ===
Early in the 1890s Tom Dennison, a gambler and saloon-owner from Colorado and Montana, arrived in Omaha and established a base of political power. He took control of most of the vice elements in the city. For more than 25 years, Dennison's power was so great that he controlled crime in the city, the police reported to him daily, and a mayor answered directly to him. The Dennison political machine ended in 1935 after he died. During his reign, Dennison kept an office at the Budweiser Saloon in the Sporting District, where he looked after his interests.

=== 20th-century changes ===
On September 28, 1919, the Omaha Race Riot erupted, one of many race riots that occurred in cities that year, reflecting common postwar economic stress and social tensions. In Omaha, Tom Dennison fanned tensions through sensational news accounts to build his own political power. The immediate cause of the riot was the arrest of 41-year-old Will Brown, an African-American Omaha civilian, on charges that he had raped a young white woman. The newspaper had contended a rash of attacks had occurred.

A mob of white men, led by volatile adolescents, gathered at the Douglas County Courthouse, their numbers growing by the hour. They threatened grabbing Brown as vigilantes. They lynched Omaha Mayor Edward Smith as he tried to prevent the mob from taking Brown. The mayor was rescued by Omaha police, but they could not control the mob. The men set fire to the Courthouse while trying to flush out Brown and police officers trying to protect him and numerous other prisoners. They lynched Brown after he was turned over to them and then attacked other parts of the city. Utterly unable to control the situation, the city asked for help from the United States Army. By September 29, the Army had declared martial law, enforcing it with 1,700 soldiers from nearby Fort Omaha, Camp Funston (part of present-day Fort Riley, Kansas) and Camp Dodge, Iowa. No further loss of life occurred after Brown was lynched.

Historians attributed the Omaha Race Riot of 1919 directly to Dennison's influence. After his candidate for mayor lost the election, Dennison worked to gain control by some other means. Acting in collusion with the Omaha Bee, a tabloid newspaper, Dennison heightened tensions of the city's World War I veterans and others by sensationalizing apparent increases in attacks on women by African American men. (Later investigations showed many attacks had been made by Dennison's white thugs dressed in black face.) The riot brought an end to the mayorship of Dennison's opponent. No one was convicted of any crime in the lynching.

=== 1920s and Prohibition ===
In 1926 Frank Carter was sentenced to be executed after he was found guilty of murdering two Omahans and terrorizing the city as the "Phantom Sniper" for more than two weeks.

During the 1920s and 30s, Little Italy was the center of crimes associated with the manufacture, distribution, and competition over profits of bootleg liquor during Prohibition. Little Italy native Tony Biase was the "leading Mafioso in Omaha" from the Prohibition through the 1970s.

=== Safety measures ===
In 1923, the police created a separate motor force unit. "Pill boxes" were installed throughout the city. Some pill boxes were still in service in 2005. Theories of policing have alternated between the use of vehicle units and more community-based patrols.

Also in 1923, the police department established the first safety patrol in the United States, chiefly to ensure children negotiated increased vehicle traffic safely as they walked to and from school.

== Current ==
In 2007, there was an increase in crime and gang-related shootings in Omaha. The violent crime rate in Omaha is similar to the national average.

The single event with the most fatalities in recent years was due to a lone gunman. On December 5, 2007, 19-year-old Robert A. Hawkins, who had a history of drug abuse and social problems, opened fire at random with a Century WASR-10 semiautomatic rifle in the Von Maur store of the Westroads Mall. He shot a total of twelve people, killing eight, before committing suicide.

=== Police killings ===
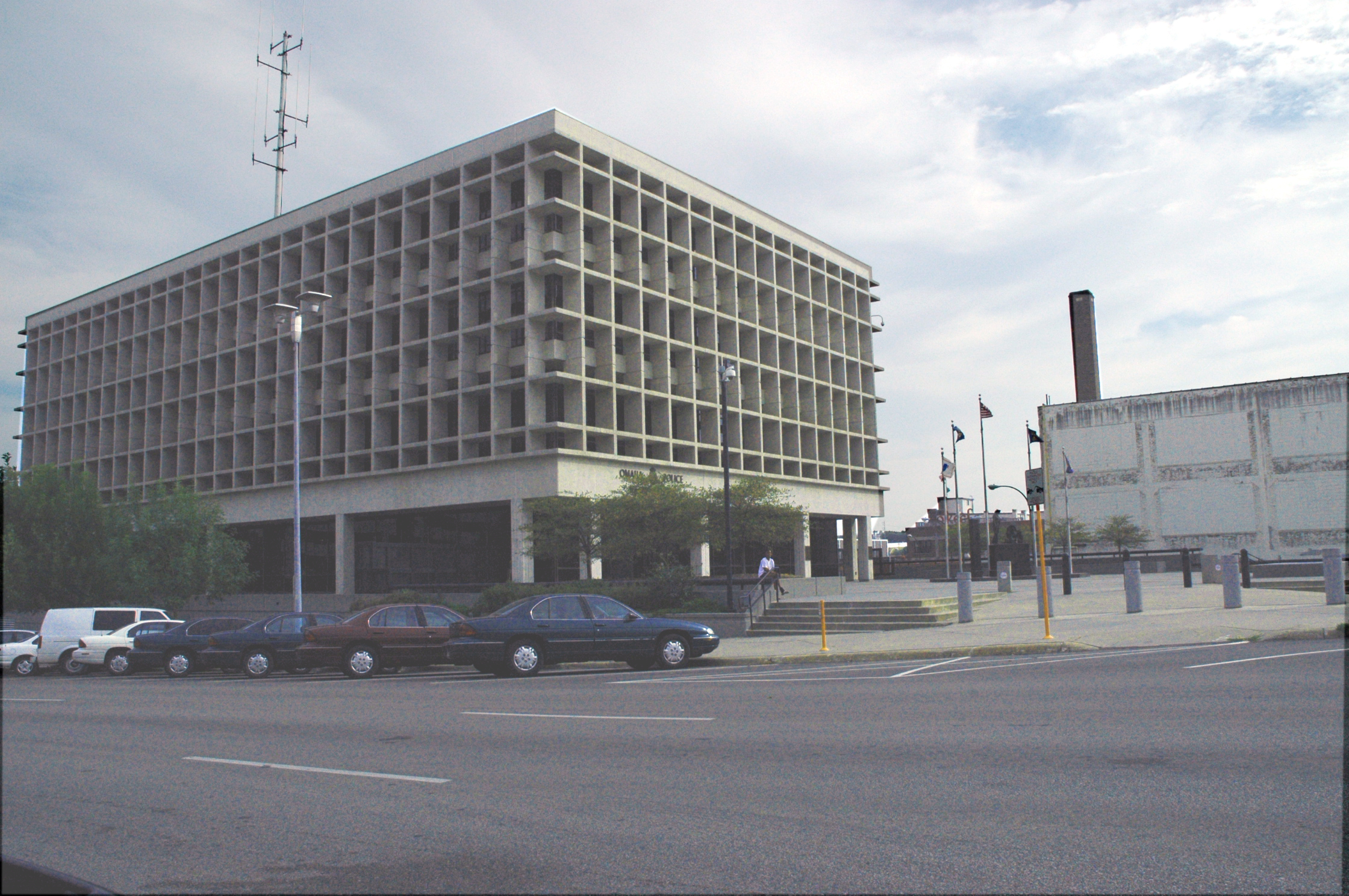
Omaha Police Station located at 505 South 15th Street

A South Omaha policeman named Edward Lowry apprehended a Greek man accused of having an illicit affair with a white woman on February 14, 1909. During the course of trying to apprehend the suspect, the officer was killed. After the man was finally apprehended, a mob thronged around the South Omaha Jail where he was being held. The police decided it was not safe to keep him there and decided to move their prisoner to the Omaha jail. The mob followed the police wagon as it left the jail. More than once they got their hands on the prisoner. At one point they almost lynched him. Once the police wagon escaped their grasp, the mob turned back towards South Omaha. On February 21, a mob of more than 1,000 men stormed "Greek Town." They looted homes and businesses, beat Greek men, women and children, and eventually burnt down every building in the area. One Greek boy was reportedly killed.

Omaha Police Officer Larry Minard was killed on August 17, 1970, by a bomb placed by members of the Black Panther Party. The Omaha Police Department was heavily involved in the FBI's COINTELPRO operation. Using evidence from COINTELPRO, and from the confession of Duane Peak, Panthers David Rice (now known as Mondo we Langa) and Ed Poindexter were convicted for Minard's death. They are currently serving life sentences. The guilt of the two has been questioned, and Amnesty International has released reports criticising the prosecution's actions in the Rice/Poindexter Case.

On August 21, 1995, 24-year-old Omaha Police Officer Jimmy Wilson Jr. was shot to death by Kevin Allen, a member of the South Family Bloods street gang. When Wilson directed Allen to stop his van, Allen opened the rear doors and opened fire. Wilson was found dead in his cruiser with his seatbelt still on and his radio in his hand. Allen was convicted of first degree murder and use of a firearm to commit a felony. He was sentenced to life in prison. Wilson's father Jimmy Wilson Sr. created the Jimmy Wilson Jr. Foundation, a non-profit organization to help purchase body armor and dashboard cameras for cruisers for area law-enforcement agencies.

On September 11, 2003, 30-year-old Omaha Police Officer Jason Tye Pratt pulled a vehicle over at 10:30 p.m. for speeding and erratic driving. The driver of the vehicle was 21-year-old Albert Rucker, a fugitive wanted by police on two felony warrants. Rucker had 141 arrests on his record by then. Rucker pulled over, left his vehicle and fled the scene. Pratt assisted the other Officers at the scene searching for Rucker. Rucker shot Pratt in the head as he approached him in hiding. Rucker then engaged backup Officer Frank Platt in a shootout in which he was mortally wounded by Platt. Rucker died four hours later in the hospital. Officer Jason Pratt died 8 days later on September 19. The incident gained national attention. On a visit to Omaha with Pratt's widow, Stacy, and family, US Attorney General John Ashcroft stated "the justice system had failed Pratt and her two daughters". This was based on the fact that Rucker had repeatedly appeared before Douglas County District Judge, Sandra Dougherty, since 1999, and she had lowered Rucker's bond each time.

Detective Kerrie Orozco was shot and killed on May 20, 2015, while serving an arrest warrant on a suspect in North Omaha. The suspect was shot and killed by other officers in the incident.

There were 37 homicides in Omaha during 2011.

== Racial tension ==
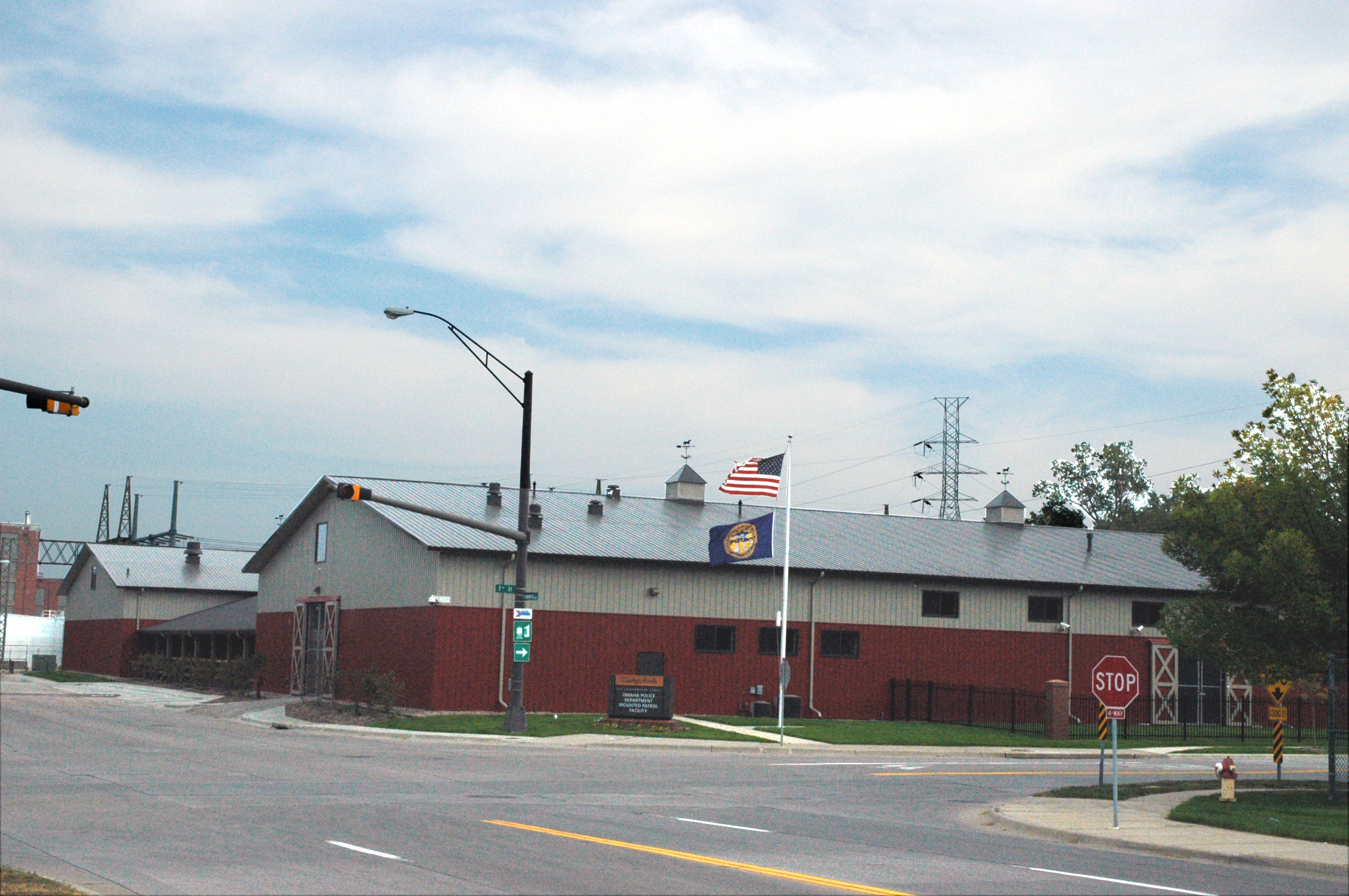
Omaha Police horsebarn located at South Seventh and Leavenworth Streets

Long the location of racial tension, Omaha re-emerged in headlines when a local grocery store was firebombed by racists. On February 18, 2007, unknown assailants robbed, firebombed, and spray painted a racial slur on the side of Bob's Market in East Omaha. A long-time community institution, Bob's has been owned by an Ethiopian immigrant for several years. There are reports that this is not the first time the store has been targeted by terrorism. The store owner escaped bound and gagged before the building exploded and was uninjured; the blast and following fire destroyed the building. Police are investigating.

Omaha's history of racial tension extends at least to 1891, when a large white mob lynched an African American named George Smith for "leering at a white woman." This event was reinforced by the psychological effect of a second lynching of Willy Brown, a black man, in 1919, which, after the intervention of federal troops, ensured the normalcy of informal racial segregation throughout the city.

In the first part of the 20th century, after a police office caught an older Greek man being intimate with an older teenage "American" girl in February 1904, the police officer attempted to take the Greek man into custody. During the apprehension, the Greek man shot and killed the police officer. News of the incident caused an anti-Greek mob to descend upon "Greek Town", an enclave of South Omaha. After beating, looting and rioting through the community the mob forced the entire population of hundreds of Greek immigrants to leave the city within one day. The Greek population of Omaha has never recovered, and currently stands at around 1000.

This racial tension parallels the 1960s race riots in North Omaha, activities leading to the Rice/Poindexter Case and ongoing gang violence affecting the entire city from the 1980s to present.

== See also ==
- Government in Omaha
- Gambling in Omaha, Nebraska
- Gun politics
