= Gambling in Omaha, Nebraska =

Gambling in Nebraska

Gambling in Omaha, Nebraska has been significant throughout the city's history. From its founding in the 1850s through the 1930s, the city was known as a "wide-open" town, meaning that gambling of all sorts was accepted either openly or in closed quarters. By the mid-20th century, Omaha reportedly had more illicit gambling per capita than any other city in the nation. From the 1930s through the 1970s, the city's gambling was controlled by an Italian criminal element.

Today, gambling in Omaha is limited to keno and slot machines, leaving Omahans to drive across the Missouri River to Council Bluffs, Iowa, where casinos are legal and there are numerous gambling businesses. A controversial proposal by the Ponca tribe of Nebraska was approved by the National Indian Gaming Commission, allowing the tribe to build a casino that opened in 2018 in Carter Lake, Iowa, which sits geographically on the west side of the Missouri River, adjacent to Omaha, where casinos are illegal.

== 19th century ==
After its founding in 1854, pioneer Omaha became the "Gateway to the West," as an essential stopping, restocking and "jumping off" point for settlers, hunters and miners traveling to the Western United States. The city quickly became notorious for its early gambling, with an early observer remarking that, "Omaha was known from ocean to ocean with cards, dice, or whatever you wanted to gamble with." The city had an early history as a "wide open" town where gambling was accepted, along with prostitution, drugs and rampant alcohol use. In 1873, "it seemed that ever lying, cheating, four-flushing, double-dealing, card-sharping, counterfeiting scoundrel who did not already hold high public office was setting up shop in the streets of Omaha." The Burnt District was an early site for much of the city's illicit activity, including gambling. Dan Allen was a pioneer gambler in Omaha who had great influence throughout the young city. He was the long-time companion of Anna Wilson, the city's foremost madam for almost 40 years. Dan Allen ran a gambling house, saloon and pawn shop for more than a dozen years. The notorious Canada Bill Jones worked the trains from Omaha to Kansas City, Missouri in the 1870s. An 1887 law by the Nebraska State Legislature banned gambling houses in the city, driving many gamblers underground.

Starting in the 1880s, Omaha's Irish crime lord and political boss Tom Dennison created a powerful political machine that controlled all gambling, liquor and prostitution schemes in Omaha for almost 50 years. Dennison consolidated much of his operation in Omaha's Sporting District, which in addition to numerous gambling institutions, was home to "The Cribs", which were notorious prostitution houses. Jack Broomfield, a close associate of Dennison's, was a leader of the African American community in Omaha in the early 20th century. He ran the Midway, a nationally known saloon and gambling hall at 1124 Capitol Avenue near the notorious Sporting District. The Midway was formerly owned by Oscar Picketts and by Victor B. Walker. Another establishment in the Sporting District was the Diamond Gambling House located at 1312 Douglas Street. The "Big Four" Omaha gamblers in 1887, Charles Bibbins, H.B. Kennedy, Charles White and Jack Morrison, operated the facility until 1893, when it was closed by the City.

The Knights of Ak-Sar-Ben was formed in 1895 in an attempt to keep the Nebraska State Fair in Omaha after receiving an ultimatum to provide entertainment "other than saloons, gambling houses and honky tonks." Their horse racing institution, called Ak-Sar-Ben, is credited with "legitimizing legalized gambling" in Omaha.

According to The New York Times, gamblers and representatives of gambling houses formed a syndicate which offered the organizers of the 1898 Trans-Mississippi Exposition $10,000 to allow the creation of several elaborate gambling houses on the site of the Expo. The organizers turned it down; however, development likely still happened.

== The 20th century to present ==
After Tom Dennison died in the early 1930s, the city's criminal gambling element came under control of Italian American mobsters. Anthony Marcella became boss of Omaha's crime organization, including gambling, around in 1931. In 1959, he was convicted on charges of narcotics and tax evasion. Anthony Joseph Biase was the next boss, lasting only until the next year when he was sentenced to 15 years in prison. Afterwards, he maintained a low profile, and was never indicted again.

In the 1930s and 40s, Carter Lake became a gambling hot spot, as law enforcement was limited and because of its important location. At The Chez Paree, you "could listen to Sophie Tucker, have the best prime rib in town and enjoy a gambling raid or two." Patrons could "bet on any horse race in the United States," and the business was described as "the most active casino between Chicago and the West Coast.

The liberalization of Iowa gambling laws in the late 1980s was followed by the opening of the Bluffs Run Greyhound Park in 1986. By 2005, Council Bluffs was the 19th largest casino market in the U.S., with revenue equaling nearly $434 million. Today, the city's Ameristar Casino is Iowa's largest riverboat.

In 2004, Omaha state Senator Ernie Chambers and U.S. Representative Tom Osborne of Hastings co-authored an editorial opposing a set of initiatives that would have allowed casino gambling and slot machines in Nebraska.

In 2020, the state of Nebraska voted to expand gambling with Initiatives 429, 430, and 431. Despite a campaign against the initiatives led by Osbourne and then-Governor Pete Ricketts, the measure passed nearly 2-to-1.

== See also ==
- Crime in Omaha, Nebraska
- History of Omaha, Nebraska
