= Old Settlers' Association =

Civic organization in Omaha, Nebraska

The Old Settlers' Association was founded in 1866 by a group of men in Omaha, Nebraska. Membership in the organization was exclusive to settlers who were in the city before 1858. Omaha was founded in 1854. Omaha's Old Settlers' Association was responsible for recording much of the early history of the city.

== Background ==
The Old Settler's Association was a social and educational group, with the purpose of facilitating social activities, as well as collecting and preserving important statistics and interesting facts from the history of Omaha. Initially, the officers of the association were Dr. Enos Lowe, President; Dr. George L. Miller, vice president, and; Alfred D. Jones, secretary and treasurer.

== Events ==
In the summer of 1866 Miller held a reunion for the organization. William D. Brown, the founder of the Lone Tree Ferry and the man who first claimed the town site that Omaha was built on attended. Others included Alfred D. Jones, the first postmaster and surveyor; William P. Snowden, the first actual settler and the first auctioneer; Andrew J. Poppleton, the first lawyer; John Logan, the first man married in Omaha; Dr. Lowe, one of the original founders of the town) Dr. Miller, the first physician; John Withnell, who assisted in laying the first brick in Omaha in the old State House; O.B. Selden, who fired the first forge; Colonel A.R. Gilmore, the first U.S. land officer in Nebraska; James Megeath, one of the first merchants in Omaha; H.D. Johnson, who was one of the first men from Omaha to run for Congress; Capt. McPherson, who ran the first steam ferry; Captain Downs, who assisted A. D. Jones to survey the town; General Estabrook, the first United States District Attorney for Nebraska; Joseph W. Paddock, the first clerk of the first House of Representatives; Col. Miller, father of Dr. Miller; R.N. Withnell, and many others.

On January 1, 1867, a grand "Old Settlers' Reunion" was held at the Herndon House in Omaha. The honorary managers were: Dr. Enos Lowe, A.S. Paddock, A. J. Poppleton, Colonel Lewis Merrill, J.H. Lacey, Francis Smith, Hadley D. Johnson, John I. Redick, Major General Philip St. George Cook, Brigadier General Myers, James M. Woolworth, James Megeath, Thomas Davis, Dr. G.C. Monell, Major J.W. Paddock and Augustus Kountze. The floor managers were J.F. Coffman, George Wallace, Reuben Wood, A.S. Patrick and George M. Lloyd.

According to George L. Miller, an early editor of the Omaha Herald, the organization ceased to be active after 1868. In 1879 the association reorganized.

== See also ==
- History of Omaha
- Founding figures of Omaha, Nebraska
