= List of founding figures of Omaha, Nebraska =

The following people were founding figures of Omaha, Nebraska. Their period of influence ranges from 1853 through 1900.

The original founding event to establish the City of Omaha was recorded as a picnic on July 4, 1854. It took place on the hillside that eventually became home of the Nebraska Territory Capitol, and later Omaha Central High School. Some of the figures in attendance at this event are included on this list; others were left off because their influence in the city did not continue afterwards.+ Some of the attendees included Hadley A. Johnson; Alfred D. Jones and his wife; A.J. Hanscom and his wife; William D. Brown and his wife; Thomas Davis and his wife; Frederick Davis and his wife; and a Mr. Seely and his wife.

Others in the following list were members of the Old Settlers' Association and/or the Omaha Claim Club. Many were buried at the Prospect Hill Cemetery in North Omaha.

== Founding figures ==
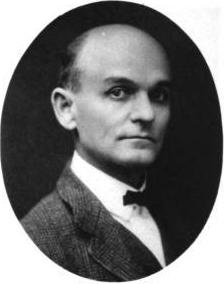
Omaha's perpetual mayor, Cowboy Jim Dahlman

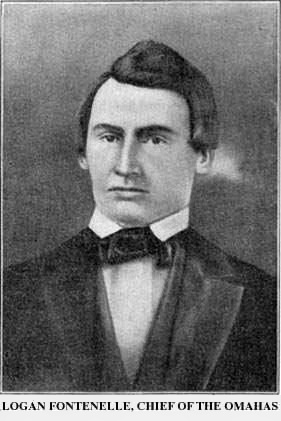
Logan Fontenelle, chief of the Omaha Tribe who signed the treaty making the city of Omaha's land available

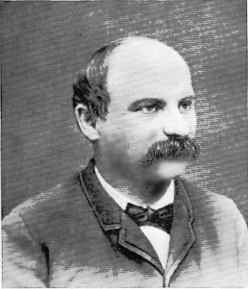
Edward Rosewater, founder and editor of the Omaha Bee, a pioneer-era newspaper

Name	Birth	Death	Occupation	Notable contribution
Dan Allen	1832	1884	Riverboat gambler	Influential; longtime partner of Anna Wilson
George Robert Armstrong	1 August 1819	April 20, 1896	Mayor	Served as mayor twice
Erastus Benson	1854	February 10, 1932 (Omaha)	Real estate, investor	Founded Benson; candidate, 1906 Omaha mayor; philanthropist
William D. Brown	1813	February 3, 1868	Businessman	Operated Lone Tree Ferry
William Byers	February 22, 1831	March 25, 1903	Surveyor and politician	Created first map of Omaha; member of first Omaha City Council, Nebraska Territorial Legislature
Edward Creighton	1820	1874	Banker, First National Bank of Omaha	Namesake of Creighton University
John A. Creighton	1831	1907	Freighter	Philanthropist brother of Edward; helped endow Creighton University
Mary Creighton	1834	1876	Wife of Edward	Bestowed money for Creighton University in his memory
"Cowboy" James Dahlman	1856	1930	Mayor	Tolerant of the Sporting District; elected eight times
Tom Dennison	1858	1934	Political boss for 30+ years	Likely started Omaha Race Riot of 1919; ran criminal enterprise and the Sporting District
Harry Porter Deuel	11 December 1836	23 November 1914	Early railroad pioneer	Oldest railroad man in Omaha when he died, Deuel ran a successful steamboat agency in the early years of Omaha, and later worked for the Union Pacific and Burlington Railroads.
Ada Everleigh	February 15, 1866 Greene County, Virginia	January 5, 1960 New York City	Madam	Ran brothel at Trans-Mississippi Exposition
Minna Everleigh	July 13, 1864 Greene County, Virginia	September 16, 1948 New York City	Madam	Ran brothel at Trans-Mississippi Exposition
Logan Fontenelle	1825	July 16, 1855	Chief of Omaha (tribe)	Responsible for signing over the city's land
Reuben Gaylord	28 April 1812	10 January 1880	Early minister	Called the "father of Congregationalism in Nebraska."
Augustus Hall	29 April 1814	1 February 1861		First Chief Justice of the Nebraska Territory
Andrew J. Hanscom	3 February 1828	11 September 1907	Territorial lawyer, Nebraska politician and real estate broker	An attendee at the 1854 picnic founding Omaha, he later platted the Hanscom Park neighborhood.
Gilbert Hitchcock	18 September 1859	3 February 1934	Owner/editor of Omaha World-Herald, Nebraska politician	
Alfred D. Jones	1814	1902	Lawyer, surveyor	An attendee at the Omaha City founding picnic in 1854; the first mayor in Omaha; and platted the city in June 1854.
Thomas Kennard	13 December 1828	24 June 1920	Lawyer	First Nebraska Secretary of State
Augustus Kountze	1826	1892	Banker	Founded First National Bank of Omaha with brother Herman
Herman Kountze	August 21, 1833, Osnaburg, Ohio	1906	Banker, real estate speculator	Co-founded First National Bank of Omaha; platted Kountze Place; Treasurer of Trans-Mississippi Exposition; Investor in Omaha Stockyards; namesake of Kountze Park
Frederick Krug	1855	November 18, 1930	Founder of Krug Brewing Company and Krug Park	
George B. Lake	15 September 1826	27 July 1910		One of the first justices of the Nebraska Supreme Court
Enos Lowe	5 May 1804	12 February 1880	Doctor	One of the first doctors in Omaha, Lowe was a founding member of many organizations.
Jesse Lowe	March 11, 1814	April 3, 1868	Mayor	Before he was the first mayor of Omaha, Lowe and his brother were among the founders of the city. He reportedly chose the name "Omaha City" in recognition of the Omaha Tribe which lived in the region for hundreds of years prior.
John L. McCague	?	?	Real estate agent	Early land speculator in Omaha
James G. Megeath	November 18, 1824	November 9, 1906		
Frederick Metz	1832 in Hessel-Cassel, Germany	1901 in Omaha	Owner of Metz Brewery	Two time state legislator
Ezra Millard	February 2, 1833	August 20, 1886	Banker, Omaha National Bank	Namesake of Millard
George L. Miller	1830	28 August 1920	Physician, editor, politician, civic leader and land owner	First doctor in Omaha
James C. Mitchell	1810	1860	Real estate salesman, ferry operator	Founded the town of Florence
William A. Paxton	1837	18 July 1907	Businessman, politician	Created Omaha Stockyards and many other companies
A. J. Poppleton	24 July 1830	9 September 1896	Lawyer, politician	Founded first law firm in the Nebraska territory; second mayor of Omaha
John I. Redick	29 July 1828	2 April 1906	Businessman	Operated city's first opera house; early donor to Omaha University
Byron Reed	1821	1891	Real estate agent	First real estate agent in Nebraska; held public offices
Elizabeth Doughton Reeves	?	?	Doctor	First woman physician in Omaha, mother-in-law of A.D. Jones, mother of Jesse Reeves
Matthew Ricketts	1858	1917	Physician	First African American to graduate from University of Nebraska College of Medicine, and first to join Nebraska Legislature
Edward Rosewater	January 21, 1841	August 30, 1906	Newspaper editor	Founder and editor of the Omaha Bee
Moses F. Shinn	January 3, 1809	?	Settler and farmer	Founded Prospect Hill Cemetery
John A. Smiley	?	?		Opened first Omaha Stockyards and sold it to William A. Paxton
William and Rachel Snowden	?	?		By July 11, 1854, Snowden was the first resident of Omaha City. He built a crude log structure at Twelfth and Jackson Streets as their home, converted it into the St. Nicholas Hotel, and then built their own house.
Gottlieb Storz	?	1939 (Wurttemberg, Germany)	Founder/owner of Storz Brewery	Built Prague Hotel; highly respected among immigrant community
Josie Washburn	1853	?	Brothel worker/madam	Wrote first book about brothels by a brothel worker
Gurdon Wattles	May 12, 1855-	1932	Organizer of the Trans-Mississippi Exposition	
Anna Wilson	May 27, 1835	October 27, 1911	Brothel owner/madam	Philanthropist; left estate to city on death

== See also ==
- History of Omaha
- List of mayors of Omaha, Nebraska
- List of people from Omaha, Nebraska
- Kountze family (category)
- Creighton family (category)
