= Pat Crowe =

American criminal and writer (1869–1938)

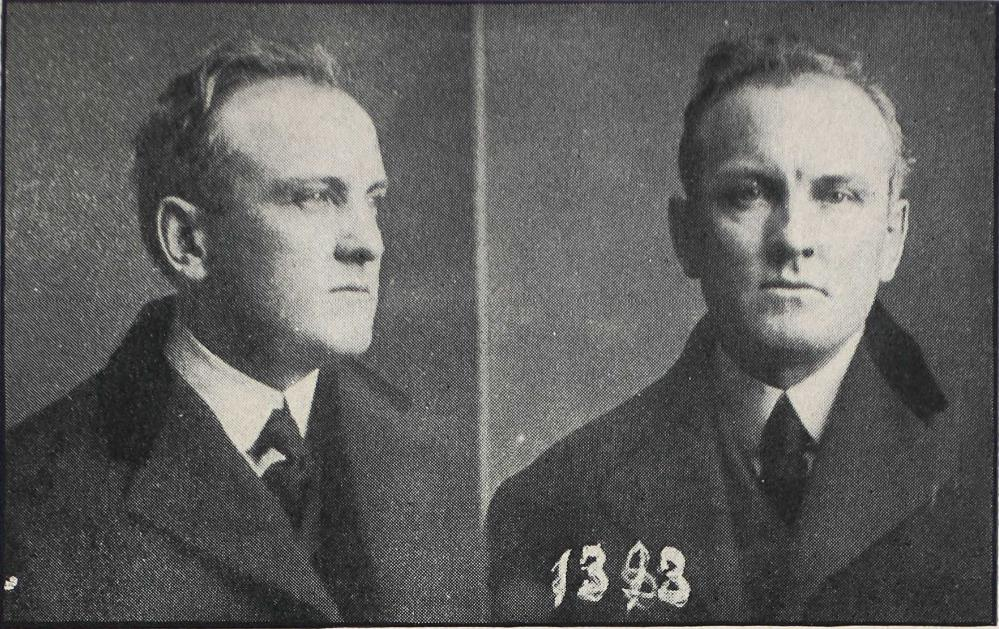
- Crowe's arrest photo in Butte, Montana, US
- Born: Patrick Thomas Crowe; 1869; Scott County, Iowa
- Died: 29 October 1938 (aged 68–69); Harlem, New York City
- Other name: Frank Roberts
- Occupations: Criminal; speaker; writer
- Spouse: Hattie Kruse Murphy (separated)
- Status: Served
- Conviction: Larceny
- Criminal charges: Bank robbery, train robbery, kidnapping
- Penalty: Six years in Joilet prison

Patrick Thomas Crowe (1869 – October 29, 1938), also known as Frank Roberts, was an American criminal who was implicated in the 1900 kidnapping of Edward Cudahy Jr. in Omaha, Nebraska. He later became a lecturer and writer.

Crowe's criminal notoriety as a bank and train robber and as a kidnapper gained him fame across the United States when he began writing and speaking about his exploits in the late 19th century. According to Time magazine, Crowe's "misdemeanors began with robbing Omaha streetcars in 1890 and included a diamond theft, homicidal attempts, a visit to and escape from Joliet prison, hold-ups and pilfering on railroads".

After his last acquittal in the Cudahy trial, the Omaha Daily News described him as "one of the few really spectacular and truly named desperadoes" of the day, while an obituary called him, "one of the most colorful figures in American criminal history".

Today, his written personal narratives of the Cudahy story are studied for their authenticity.

== Early life and criminal career ==
Crowe was born on a farm outside Davenport, Iowa, and had 11 siblings. He was of Irish descent. Soon after he turned 13 his mother died, and Crowe moved to South Omaha, Nebraska, a new town centered on a growing meat packing industry. Along with a partner named Pat Cavanaugh, Crowe opened a butcher shop in the area at age 17. Soon after, his shop was closed by the large operation owned by Edward Cudahy. He was hired by the Cudahy Meatpacking Plant shortly thereafter. Cudahy fired Crowe after he was caught stealing money from the operation.

Crowe held a variety of jobs and committed small crimes until the early 1890s. Using the alias Frank Roberts, Crowe perpetrated a variety of crimes. After being detained by police in a pawnbroker's shop in Chicago, Crowe got in a gunfight with police. He was arrested and sentenced to six years in the Joliet prison for the gunfight and the alleged attempted robbery of the pawnbroker's shop. However, he did not serve this entire sentence: Governor Joseph W. Fifer pardoned him after he had only served 17 months.

In 1894, a local newspaper was granted an interview with Crowe, whose crimes had brought him international notoriety. The newspaper painted a flattering portrait of Crowe:

Pacing back and forth in a real cell at the central police station when alone and readily entering in conversation with all who came to see him, yesterday, was Patrick Thomas Crowe, who in the past has become so notorious as a crook that his fame extends to two continents. [The reporter] found the prisoner not only a fine looking and intelligent appearing young man, but his conversation proved him to be well informed, possessing a good education. He is a ready, fluent and entertaining conversationalist, using good language, at no time in an hour's interview did he use a vulgar or profane word. He claims that he neither drinks, smokes or chews. In fact the only wrong doing that he says he has ever been guilty of is robbing and stealing. He is even been choice in the class of literature that he has read, only perusing the best class of periodicals and books, which is shown by apt quotations that he uses at times.

During the interview, he told the reporter that he had been married at 18 and had three children, all of whom had died young.

In 1897, Crowe, again as Roberts, was sent to trial in Denver, Colorado, for burglary and larceny of a jewelry store. However, he jumped bond and was never tried.

Crowe resurfaced in South Omaha around 1900 with his old comrade Pat Cavanaugh. That winter they kidnapped Edward Cudahy Jr. After scoring the first successful ransom for a kidnapping in the United States, Crowe disappeared, resurfacing a number of times until 1905. That year, he walked down the streets of Butte, Montana, asking to be arrested for the kidnapping. In February 1906, despite the prosecution's 40 witnesses, a firsthand account of a confession to a priest, and no testimony by his defense, Crowe was acquitted by a jury.

== After the kidnapping ==
After his acquittal, Crowe was not implicated in any more major crimes, but was arrested for panhandling in New York. He wrote two autobiographies, in both of which he admitted his responsibility for Cudahy's kidnapping. In 1927, a biographer wrote Crowe's life story, portraying him as "a modern-day Robin Hood".

In 1920, Crowe ended up at The Salvation Army in New York City working as a nightwatchman at the Hut in Manhattan's Union Square.

== Death ==
Crowe ended his life living in poverty in Harlem, a neighborhood of New York City, in 1938. He suffered a heart attack and fell down the stairs of his dwelling, fracturing his skull. He died in Harlem Hospital. Despite his humble endings, about 100 people gathered to celebrate a Roman Catholic Funeral Mass for him at St. Paul the Apostle Church.

== Bibliography ==
- Koblas, John (2006). The Last Outlaw: The Life of Pat Crowe. North Star Press of St. Cloud, Inc.
- Regan, Thomas (1927). Spreading Evil: Pat Crowe's Autobiography. Branwell Company.

== See also ==
- Crime in Omaha, Nebraska
- History of Omaha, Nebraska
- List of bank robbers and robberies
