= Enos Lowe =

American politician

- Born: May 5, 1804; Raleigh, North Carolina
- Died: February 13, 1880 (aged 75); Omaha, Nebraska
- Occupation: Doctor
- Known for: President of Second Iowa Constitutional Convention

Enos Lowe (May 5, 1804 – February 13, 1880) was a pioneer medical doctor and businessman who was among the original founders of Omaha, Nebraska, and served as president of the Second Iowa Constitutional Convention.

== Biography ==
Enos Lowe was born on May 5, 1804, in Raleigh, North Carolina, in the county of Guilford. Along with his brother Jesse, Lowe's parents were strict Quakers, and his early training in Quaker principles were said to guide his entire life.

Desiring to enter the medical profession, Lowe took a course in medicine at the Ohio Medical College, a medical school now called The Ohio State University College of Medicine and located in Columbus, Ohio. From there, Lowe moved to Greencastle, Indiana, where he open a medical practice. In addition, Lowe became active in the Indiana Democratic Party and was elected to the Indiana state legislature.

In 1837 at the age of 33, Lowe moved to the Black Hawk Purchase, an area of 6 million acres (24,000 km^{2}) in what is now Iowa that was purchased by the United States federal government five years prior in connection with the Black Hawk War. There, Lowe began practicing medicine in the relatively new, small frontier village of Burlington, Iowa. Over the next seven years, his reputation grew and Lowe became widely and favorably known. In 1844, Lowe was chosen a member of the First Constitutional Convention of Iowa.

At the constitutional convention, Lowe got to know many of the future leaders of Iowa. However, their efforts were unsuccessful and the Constitution framed by the 1844 convention was rejected. Two years later, Lowe was elected to the 1846 Iowa Constitutional Convention. His popularity continued to increase and Lowe was elected to preside over the convention. This time, their effort were successful and the convention enacted the Constitution under which Iowa became a State. He was elected a state senator for the third General Assembly, and presided over that body.

After Lowe presided over the 1846 convention and at the same time a United States General Land Office was established at Iowa City, he was appointed receiver of public money and moved to Iowa City. In 1853 at the age of 49, Lowe was appointed receiver of the United States Land Office at Council Bluffs. Additionally, Lowe and his brother Jesse co-founded the Council Bluffs and Omaha Steam Ferry Company, along with several other partners. The Council Bluffs company platted the town of Omaha, Nebraska, in 1853 and Lowe became one of the founders of the city of Omaha in 1854.

A member of Omaha's Old Settlers' Association, later Lowe served as the first president of the Omaha Medical Society in 1866. He was also an incorporator of the Platte Valley and Pacific Railway Company, which was instrumental in maintaining Omaha's early prospects as a railroad city, as well as the Council Bluffs and St. Joseph Railroad.

Lowe died on February 13, 1880, in Omaha.

== See also ==
- Founding figures of Omaha, Nebraska
- History of Omaha
