= History of Omaha, Nebraska =

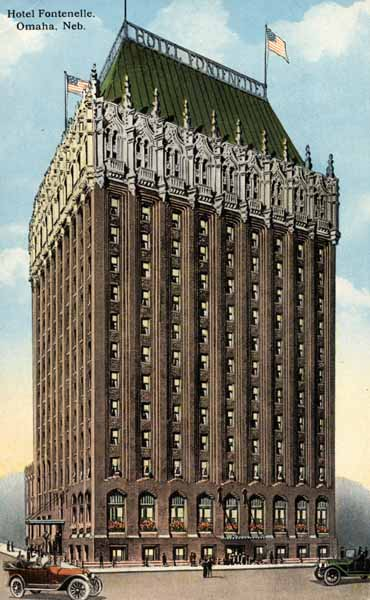
The Hotel Fontenelle, formerly located in downtown Omaha

The history of Omaha, Nebraska, began before the settlement of the city, with speculators from neighboring Council Bluffs, Iowa, staking land across the Missouri River illegally as early as the 1840s. When it was legal to claim land in Indian Country, William D. Brown was operating the Lone Tree Ferry to bring settlers from Council Bluffs to Omaha. A treaty with the Omaha Tribe allowed the creation of the Nebraska Territory, and Omaha City was founded on July 4, 1854. With early settlement came claim jumpers and squatters, and the formation of a vigilante law group called the Omaha Claim Club, which was one of many claim clubs across the Midwest. During this period many of the city's founding fathers received lots in Scriptown, which was made possible by the actions of the Omaha Claim Club. The club's violent actions were challenged successfully in a case ultimately decided by the U.S. Supreme Court, Baker v. Morton, which led to the end of the organization.

Surrounded by small towns and cities that competed for business from the hinterland's farmers, the city suffered a major setback in the Panic of 1857. Despite this, Omaha quickly emerged as the largest city in Nebraska. After losing the Nebraska State Capitol to Lincoln in 1867, many business leaders rallied and created the Jobbers Canyon in downtown Omaha to outfit farmers in Nebraska, South Dakota, Wyoming and further west. Their entrepreneurial success allowed them to build mansions in Kountze Place and the Old Gold Coast neighborhoods.

With the development of the Omaha Stockyards and neighboring packinghouses in the 1870s, several workers' housing areas, including Sheelytown, developed in South Omaha. Its growth happened so quickly that the town was nicknamed the "Magic City". The latter part of the 19th century also saw the formation of several fraternal organizations, including the formation of Knights of Aksarben. City leaders rallied for the creation of the Trans-Mississippi Exposition in 1898. During the Expo, famous madames Anna Wilson and Ada Everleigh were making a good living from the crowds. At the same time, Boss Tom Dennison compounded the city's vices in the notorious Sporting District, with the full support of eight-term mayor "Cowboy" James Dahlman. Many of these early pioneers are buried in Prospect Hill Cemetery. City leaders created Omaha University in 1908.

With reform administrations in the 1930s and 1940s, the city became a meatpacking powerhouse. Several regional beer breweries developed, including Metz, Storz and Krug companies. The city's southern suburb became home to the Strategic Air Command in the late 1940s; in 1950 the Rosenblatt Stadium in South Omaha became home to the College World Series. Labor unrest in the 1930s resulted in organizing of the meatpacking plants by the CIO-FCW, which built an interracial partnership and achieved real gains for the workers for some decades.

After World War II, blacks in Omaha as in other parts of the nation began to press harder for civil rights. Veterans believed they deserved full rights after fighting for the nation. Some organizations had already been formed, but they became more active, leading into the city's Civil Rights Movement.

Suburbanization and highway expansion led to white flight to newer housing and development of middle and upper-class areas in West Omaha from the 1950s through the 1970s. The historically ethnically diverse areas of North and South Omaha became more concentrated by economics, race, and class. These workers suffered dramatic job losses during the industrial restructuring that increased rapidly in the 1960s, and poverty became more widespread.

== White contact with Native Americans ==
Omaha's location near the confluence of the Missouri River and Platte River has long made the location a key point of transfer for both people and goods. Prior to European-American establishment of the city, numerous Indian tribes had inhabited the area, including the Pawnee, Otoe, Sioux, the Missouri and Ioway. They had developed a semi-nomadic lifestyle necessary for survival on the Great Plains. Since the 17th century, the Pawnee, Otoe, Sioux, and Ioway all variously occupied the land that became Omaha. The Pawnee and Otoe tribes had inhabited the region for hundreds of years by the time the Dhegihan Omaha tribe had arrived from the lower Ohio valley in the early 18th century. Translated, the word "Omaha" (Omaha–Ponca: Umoⁿhoⁿ) means "Dwellers on the Bluff". Usually, the word is translated "against the current," but in those cases no source is quoted.

During the late 18th and early 19th centuries when they were the most powerful Indians along the stretch of the Missouri River north of the Platte, the Omaha nation moved on the western edge of present-day Bellevue, Nebraska. After a smallpox outbreak, cultural degradation, the elimination of the buffalo, and continued property loss, the Omaha sold the last of their claims in 1856 and relocated to their present reservation in Thurston County, in northeastern Nebraska.

== European settlement ==
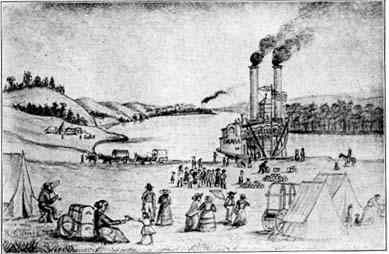
The Mormon settlement known as Cutler's Park, located in the Florence area in the 1840s

On July 21, 1804, the Lewis and Clark Expedition passed by the riverbanks that would later become the city of Omaha. On July 22 the Corps of Discovery established a camp near present-day Bellevue for five nights, naming it "Camp White Catfish." On the 27th, William Clark and Reuben Fields investigated mysterious earthen mounds close to where 8th and Douglas Streets and the Heartland of America Park are today in Downtown Omaha. That night they camped in an area that is Eppley Airfield today. The expedition stopped at a point about 20 miles (30 km) north of present-day Omaha, at which point they first met with the Otoe. They had a council meeting with members of the tribal leadership on the west side of the Missouri River. The first recorded instance of a black person in the Omaha area was "York", an enslaved African American who accompanied William Clark on the Expedition.

The Astor Expedition came through in 1811. Stephen Long passed through the Omaha area in 1819 on his Platte River Expedition. A decade later, adventurers and fur traders were frequenting the region, trading at Fort Lisa, built by Manuel Lisa in 1806; Fort Atkinson, built in 1819 as a military outpost adjacent to the location of the earlier council meeting; and Cabanne's Trading Post, built by the American Fur Company in 1822.

In 1825 a fur trader named J.B. Royce built a stockade and trading post on a plateau near the present-day block formed by Dodge Street and Capitol Avenue, Ninth and Tenth Streets. That establishment was abandoned and decayed within the next 20 years.

In the 1840s the Mormons built a town called Cutler's Park in the area before resuming their westward migration on the Mormon Trail.

In 1854 Logan Fontenelle and the Omaha Tribe sold the majority of their tribal land, four million acres (16,000 km^{2}), to the United States for less than 22 cents an acre. This allowed the settlement of Nebraska Territory and the founding of Omaha City. That year the formation of the Territory in the Kansas–Nebraska Act was based on the condition that it remain slave-free.

== Pioneer Omaha: 1853 to 1867 ==
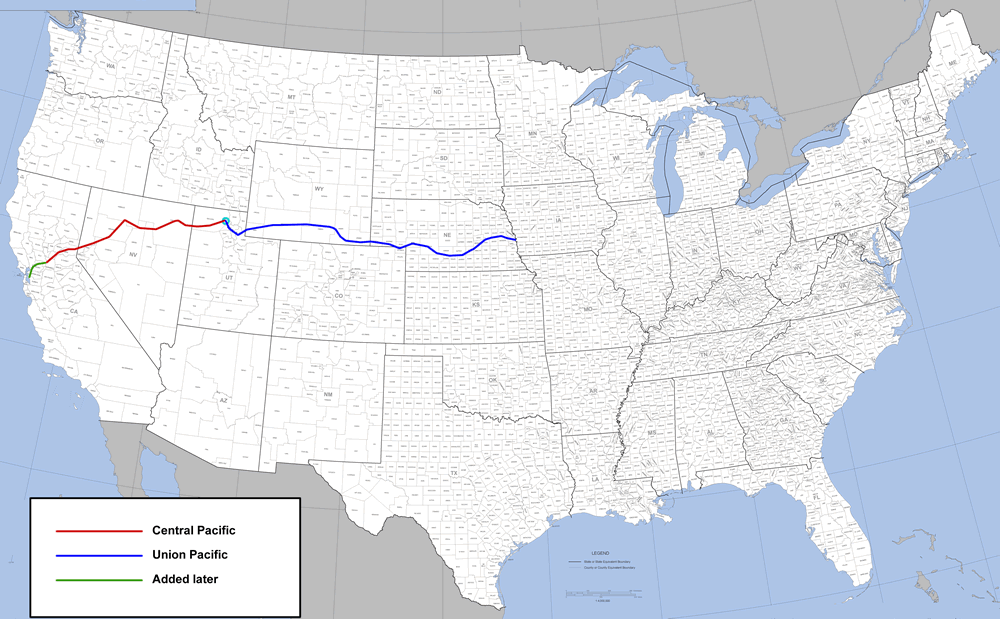
Route of the First transcontinental railroad, starting in Omaha

In 1853 William D. Brown operated the Lone Tree Ferry to shuttle California Gold Rush prospectors and Oregon Trail settlers across the river between Kanesville, Iowa and the Nebraska Territory. The Lone Tree Ferry eventually became the Council Bluffs and Nebraska Ferry Company. "Omaha City" was organized by the owners of the Council Bluffs & Nebraska Ferry Company to lure the proposed transcontinental railroad to Council Bluffs. Alfred D. Jones, Omaha City's first postmaster, platted the town site early in 1854, months after the Kansas–Nebraska Act created the Nebraska Territory. The first black person in Omaha arrived in 1854.

While the city was young, there were no formal police or sheriff, or at least one with any significant authority. Compensating for the absence of the law, many early Omaha pioneers formed a claim club to create and enforce a legal system to their advantage. The Omaha Claim Club took authority over many areas of the new city, generally focused on land-related issues. In the 1860s, ten years after the city's formation, early citizens also created the Old Settlers' Association to record the early history of the settlement.

Aside from Omaha, other early settlements and towns in the area include Fontenelle's Post founded in 1806; Fort Lisa founded 1806; Culter's Park, founded 1846; Bellevue, settled in 1804 and founded 1853; East Omaha, founded in the 1850s; and Saratoga, founded 1857. The town of Florence was platted by James C. Mitchell in 1854 and founded in 1855.

The first minister in Omaha was Moses F. Shinn, a Methodist Episcopal Church leader from Council Bluffs. Most of Omaha's early pioneers, including Nebraska Territory politicians, soldiers from Fort Omaha and the early African-American community, were buried at Prospect Hill Cemetery in North Omaha. Starting in 1887 Douglas County officials started recording the burials of poor people and people without a known identity in Potter's Field. Located in far North Omaha, today Potter's Field is maintained by Forest Lawn Cemetery, which is located nearby. There is speculation that Mormon pioneers were buried there in the 1850s, as well.

The Nebraska State Capitol was moved from Omaha in 1867.

=== Nebraska Territory Capitol ===
Late in 1854 Omaha was chosen as the territorial capital for Nebraska. In 1855 during a land grab a group of businessmen formed the Omaha Land Company and platted Scriptown to reward Nebraska Territory legislators for their votes for statehood. After Baker v. Morton in 1857, this type of land baron-like behavior was made illegal; by that time lots had been developed and Scriptown quickly became part of several neighborhoods, including Gifford Park, Prospect Hill and the Near North Side.

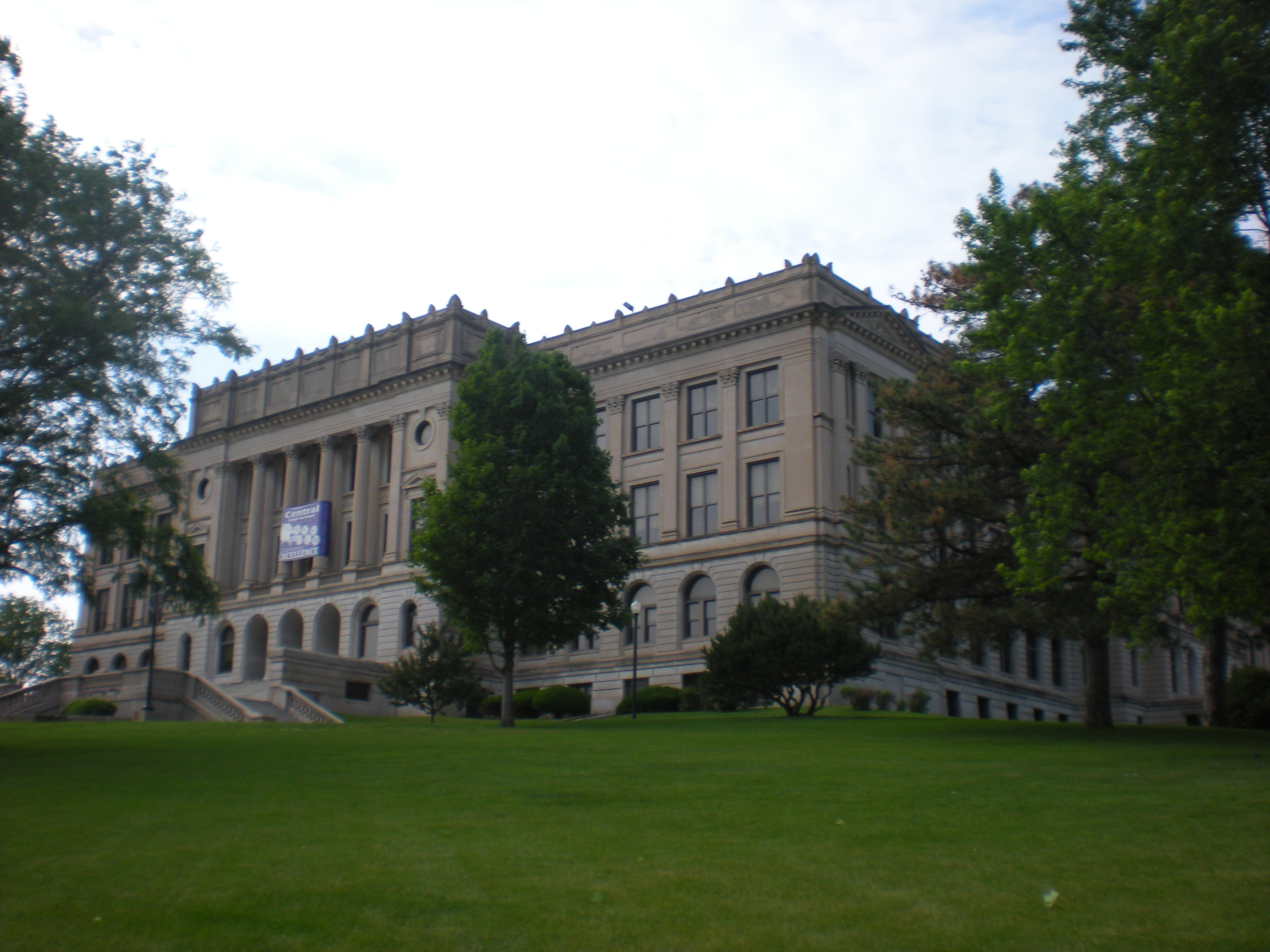
Omaha Central High School sits on the site of the old capitol building on capitol hill in Downtown Omaha.

The small city suffered greatly in the economic Panic of 1857; however, the presence of the capital is credited for keeping the town alive. For several years Omaha enjoyed its status as the capital of the Nebraska Territory, although not without contention. In January 1858 a group of representatives illegally moved the Nebraska Territorial Legislature to Florence following a violent outburst at the State Capitol in Omaha. After repeatedly being dogged out of voting on the removal of the Capitol from Omaha, a skirmish pitted representatives from Nebraska City, Florence, and other communities to convene outside of Omaha. Despite having a majority of members present for the vote to remove the Capitol and all agreeing, the "Florence Legislature" did not succeed in swaying the Nebraska Territory governor, and the Capitol remained in Omaha until 1867 when Nebraska gained statehood. When Omaha eventually lost the capital to Lincoln in 1867, the city was by then strong enough to maintain economic growth for a period of time.

=== Business ===
While Council Bluffs was chosen as the eastern terminus of the United States' first transcontinental railroad in 1862 with the passage of the Pacific Railway Act, construction on the railroad began west from Omaha to avoid the difficulties of constructing a bridge across the Missouri River. This ensured that Omaha would become a major transportation center for the entire country in the years to come. The Omaha Cable Tramway Company was the only cable car company that operated in Omaha. Founded in 1884, it operated cars until 1894. The warehousing sector became predominant early on, with the Jobber's Canyon playing an important role. Other efforts including the market house and various hotels weren't as successful.

== Development Era: 1868 to 1899 ==
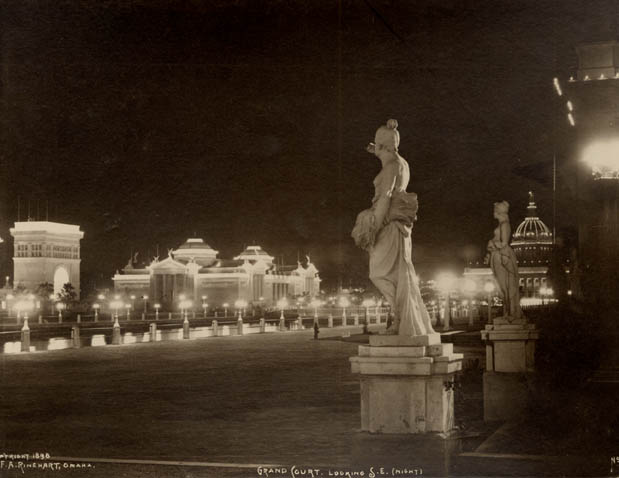
Night view of the Grand Court. Photograph by Frank Rinehart, 1898.

Towns founded during this period include Benson, founded 1887; Chalco, founded ?; Dundee, founded 1880; Elkhorn, founded 1865; Papillion, founded 1870; Ralston, founded 1888; South Omaha, founded 1886, and; Millard, which was founded in 1871.

In 1856 the Omaha Claim Club donated two lots for the congregation to build a church, and soon after Baptists, Presbyterians, Congregationalists, Episcopalians and Roman Catholics followed. Catholics dedicated St. Philomena's Cathedral in 1856, and the entire Creighton family, including Edward, his wife Mary, and his brother John greatly supported the Catholic Church. Pioneer banker Augustus Kountze called for and financially supported the founding of the first Lutheran church west of the Missouri River, which was then called Immanuel Lutheran Church and was located downtown. It was renamed after Kountze's father in the 1880s. In 1871 Omaha's Jewish community bought land to create its first cemetery.

In 1879 the trial of Standing Bear v. Crook was the first time in the nation's history an American Indian appeared in a U.S. Federal Court. At the trial General Crook testified on behalf of Standing Bear, leading the court to recognize American Indians as "persons" under the law, a precedent-setting ruling.

In the 1880s, Omaha was said to be the fastest-growing city in the United States. After Irish-born James E. Boyd founded the first packing operation in Omaha in the 1870s, thousands of immigrants from central and southern Europe came to Omaha to work in the Union Stockyards and slaughterhouses of South Omaha. They created Omaha's original ethnic neighborhoods, with names such as Sheelytown, Greek Town, Little Italy, Little Bohemia and Little Poland. Other neighborhoods founded during this period included Bemis Park, Country Club, Dog Hollow and Field Club. The Near North Side also developed greatly during this period, with high concentrations of Jews and Germans, and the first groups of African Americans.

Omaha's growth was accelerated in the 1880s by the rapid development of the Union Stockyards and the meat packing industry in South Omaha. The "Big Four" packers during this time were Armour, Wilson, Cudahy, and Swift. There were several breweries established throughout the city during this period. The "Big Four" breweries in Omaha were the Storz, Krug, Willow Springs and Metz breweries.

Culture in Omaha grew extensively during this era. With the increase in population, many social, fraternal and advocacy organizations formed in Omaha in the late 19th century. The city's premier newspapers, the Omaha Bee and the Omaha World-Herald, were founded in 1874 and 1885, respectively. Omaha was the location of the 1892 convention that formed the Populist Party, with its aptly titled Omaha Platform written by "radical farmers" from throughout the Midwest.

In 1894 the Ladies Axillary of the Ancient Order of Hibernians, a nationalistic Irish-Catholic fraternal organization, was founded in Omaha. That year the city was also the site of the first African-American fair held in the United States. The following year the Knights of Ak-Sar-Ben, a civic and philanthropic organization, was founded.

The Trans-Mississippi Exposition was held in North Omaha from June 1 to November 1, 1898. The exposition drew more than 2 million visitors. It required the construction of attractions spanning 100 city blocks, including a ship-worthy lagoon, bridges and magnificent (though temporary) buildings constructed of plaster and horsehair. The Exposition also featured a number of sideshows, including Buffalo Bill's Wild West Show and the Everleigh House. Run by Ada and Minna Everleigh, the house continued operating until 1900, when the two women moved to Chicago.

This period also saw the rise of formal crime in Omaha that presaged the arrival of Tom Dennison. The Sporting District was an area in downtown Omaha where many of the city's vice activities happened, including gambling, prostitution, and grafting. Anna Wilson was an early madam who got her start in Omaha. She eventually opened a 25-room mansion brothel at Ninth and Douglas Streets. She was the longtime romantic partner of Dan Allen, a well-known and successful riverboat gambler in Omaha. The 1900 kidnapping of Edward Cudahy Jr. in the Old Gold Coast neighborhood caused a national uproar. The perpetrator, Pat Crowe, became a nationally renowned author and lecturer on criminal justice reforms.

== Establishment Era: 1900 to 1941 ==
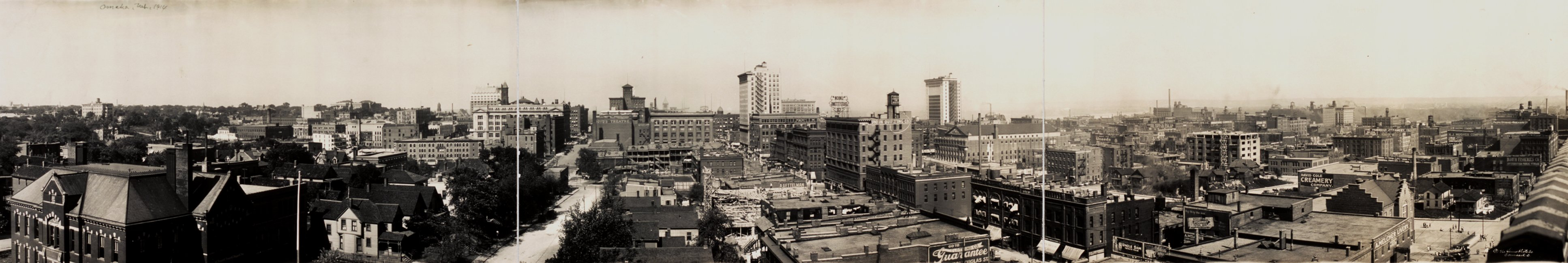
Downtown Omaha looking east from approximately North 30th and Farnam Streets circa 1914.

In the decades before World War II, Omaha went through a prosperous period marked with rapid development, cultural growth and massive growth of population throughout the city. African Americans were recruited for work by the meatpacking industry and came North in the Great Migration in highest numbers after 1910. This was also the period of highest immigration by Polish workers. A number of new residents established communities throughout the city, older immigrant populations became further assimilated into the city's culture, and growth was accommodated in neighborhoods built to the north and south of Downtown Omaha. The early 1910s saw the growth of the city's Automobile Row along Farnam Street.

The city suffered greatly during the Great Depression. Federal intervention throughout the 1930s was critical for many residents. Works Progress Administration (WPA) and Civilian Conservation Corps (CCC) projects employed many men in projects to build infrastructure of parks and community facilities. All of the current city core was surrounded by farms by this period, with buildings such as the Ackerhurst Dairy Barn indicative of that phase.

=== Sports ===
Omaha University was founded at the Redick Mansion in the Kountze Place neighborhood in 1908, moving to their present campus in 1929. Their football team played on the Saratoga School field until 1952.

The Omaha Omahogs was a baseball team started in 1900 as part of the new Western League. Their name changed to the Omaha Indians in 1902. In 1904 the team was fielded as the Omaha Packers, and in 1906 as the Omaha Rourkes. They kept that name until 1921 when the name changed to the Omaha Buffaloes, which stuck until 1928 when it changed to the Omaha Crickets. In 1930 the team changed its name back to the Omaha Packers and kept that name until 1935 when they moved to Council Bluffs and subsequently folded. A new team called the Omaha Robin Hoods formed in 1936, but moved to Rock Island, Illinois late in the year. The team reformed shortly thereafter as the Omaha Cardinals, remaining as such for several years.

=== Greek Town Riot ===
New immigrants jostled for position with those who had arrived earlier and competition for jobs and place was intense. Many immigrant ethnic groups were intensely territorial. In 1909 a mob of 1,000 ethnic white men from South Omaha almost lynched a Greek man for supposedly being involved with a "white" woman. After their efforts were thwarted, the mob grew and swarmed into Greek Town, where they destroyed homes, businesses and a school; beat Greek immigrants; and destroyed the area by burning it. No person was indicted for any aspect of the riot.

=== Easter Sunday Tornado ===
In 1913 a devastating tornado ripped through Omaha, becoming known as the Easter Sunday tornado. It killed more than 100 people, destroyed hundreds of homes, and cut a long swathe through the city, including the heart of North Omaha's Jewish and African-American commercial district, which suffered the most damage.

=== Omaha Race Riot ===
Social tensions simmered in the postwar years, as the nation adjusted to returning veterans, competition for jobs, and fears about labor unrest. After a summer of race riots in numerous industrial cities across the country, Omaha was tense, too. The newspaper had inflamed feelings with sensational stories accusing black men of crimes. The black population increased dramatically from 1910-1920 when they were recruited to work by the stockyards. When many black men worked as strikebreakers, resentment by other working-class, ethnic white men rose against them. The "independent political boss" Tom Dennison was later implicated of contributing to racial tensions in an effort to turn out a reform mayor.

The spark of the Omaha Race Riot of 1919 occurred when a black man named Will Brown was arrested and accused of raping a young white woman from South Omaha. A mob of mostly white ethnic young men marched from South Omaha (rallied and led by a henchman of Dennison's) and converged on the Douglas County Courthouse, where the jail was. In the evening the crowd grew larger and set the courthouse on fire, forcing police to turn Brown over to them. They lynched him, hanging him from a lamppost on the south side of the courthouse, then dragging his body through the streets and burning it. The mob was mostly European-born immigrants and ethnic European Americans. The mayor attempted to intervene and was also hanged; he was saved only by a last-minute rescue by federal agents. The city had to ask for help from Federal troops to quell the disorder, and their arrival was delayed because of a series of communication problems. The commander stationed troops in South Omaha to prevent more mobs from forming, and in North Omaha to protect the blacks.

=== Social and cultural developments ===
Job's Daughters International, a Masonic youth organization for girls, was founded in Omaha in 1920. Aleph Zadik Aleph, the men's Order of the B'nai B'rith Youth Organization, began in 1923 as a college fraternity.

In 1925 Malcolm X was born (as Malcolm Little) at 3446 Pinkney Street in North Omaha. His minister father moved the family to Milwaukee, Wisconsin when Malcolm was a year old after threats on their lives from the Ku Klux Klan because of his father's activism.

The Nebraska chapter of the National German-American Alliance (NGAA) was founded and led by Valentin J. Peter, the publisher and editor of the German language Omaha Tribune in 1907. By the 1920s the organization was working closely with breweries throughout the city to challenge the complete political and social assimilation of German immigrants in Nebraska. During the same period Peter was buying other German-language newspapers across the U.S. The NGAA folded in the late 1920s; Peter's business, the Interstate Publishing Company, still operates in Omaha today.

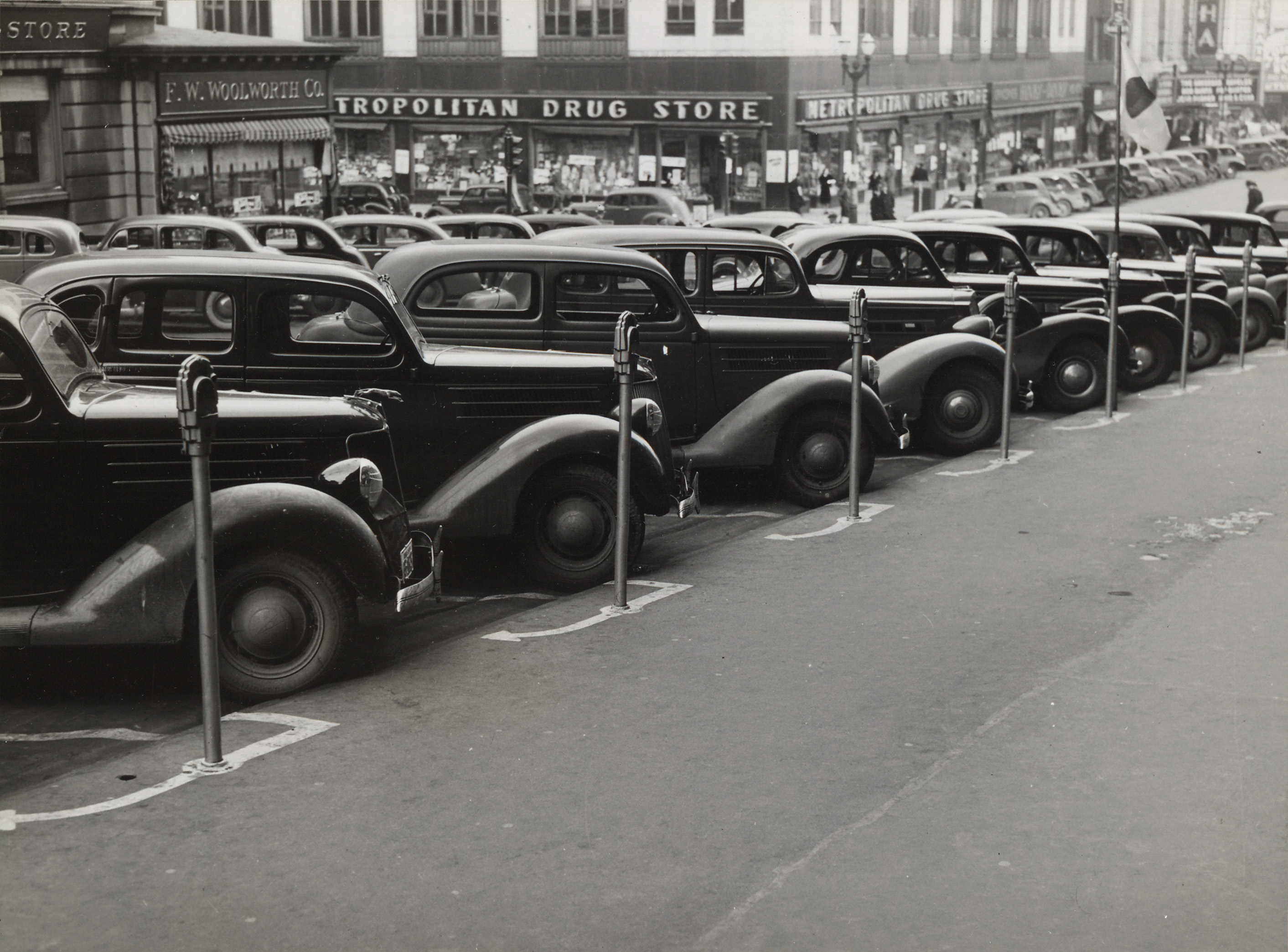
The Woolworth's store in Downtown Omaha in 1938

=== Tom Dennison ===
The reign of Omaha political boss Tom Dennison ended in 1933. For more than thirty-five years, he controlled gambling, drinking, prostitution and other criminal interests throughout Omaha, particularly in his seedy Sporting District. He controlled bootlegging operations in Little Italy through the Prohibition Era. He was closely allied with James Dahlman, Omaha's only eight-term mayor. Dennison was implicated in agitation of groups related to the Omaha Race Riot of 1919.

=== World War II ===
In 1945 the Enola Gay and Bockscar were two of 536 B-29 Superfortresses manufactured at the Glenn L. Martin Aircraft Factory (now Offutt Air Force Base) in suburban Bellevue.

That same year a Japanese fire balloon exploded over Dundee. The incident was part of a large World War II campaign by the Japanese military to cause mass chaos in American cities. The story was suppressed by the American military until after the war was over, as no one was hurt in the explosion.

== Civil Rights Movement Era ==
Civil rights activism in Omaha began in 1912 with the formation of a local chapter of the National Association for the Advancement of Colored People. It continued through the coming years under the influence of local leaders Whitney Young, George Wells Parker and Harry Haywood. Other organizations formed such as the Citizens Civic Committee for Civil Liberties (4CL) and the DePorres Club at Creighton University in the 1940s. Mainstream organizations including the Omaha Urban League (now the Urban League of Nebraska) also supported the movement, as did the CIO union in the meatpacking plants. Their successes led to the end of redlining and discriminatory neighborhood covenants, as well as the implementation of a school integration plan. In the late 1960s, the student-led Black Association for Nationalism Through Unity (BANTU) adopted a more militant posture and got into confrontations with police following the shooting of a youth in the housing project.

== Transformative Era: 1950 to 1999 ==
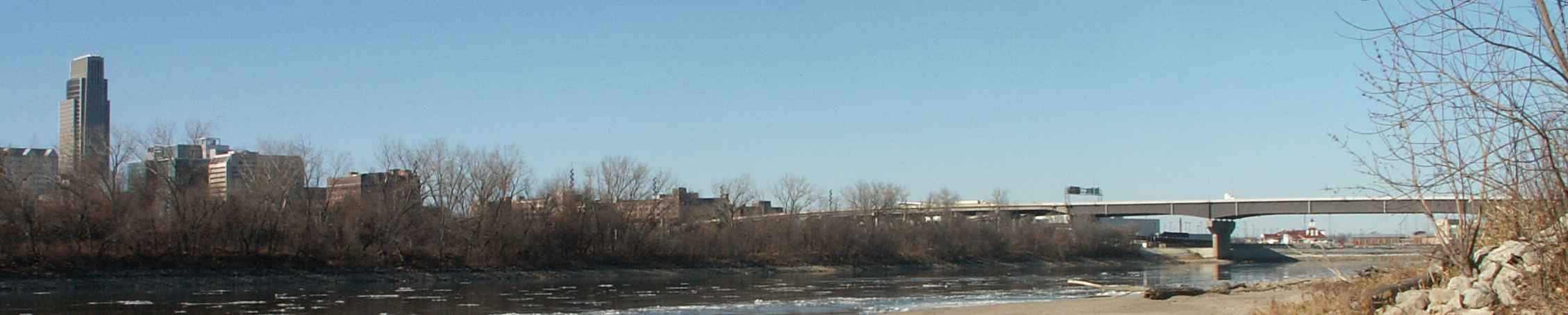
The I-480 bridge was built in 1966 over the Missouri River between Council Bluffs and Downtown Omaha.

In 1950, the NCAA moved the College World Series (CWS) to Rosenblatt Stadium, (then known as Omaha Municipal Stadium). Started in 1947, the tournament was held at Kalamazoo, Michigan in 1947 and 1948, and Wichita, Kansas in 1949. Since 1950 the series has been held annually at the Rosenblatt, despite bids from several cities to move the CWS to another venue. More than 6,000,000 fans have attended CWS games in Omaha. The City of Omaha has regularly expanded and renovated the stadium to accommodate fans, teams, and media covering the event. ESPN televised every game of the event from 1980 through 1987. ESPN started coverage again when the championship series went to a best-of-3 format in 2003. From 1988 through 2002, CBS televised the championship game: a winner-take-all single game.

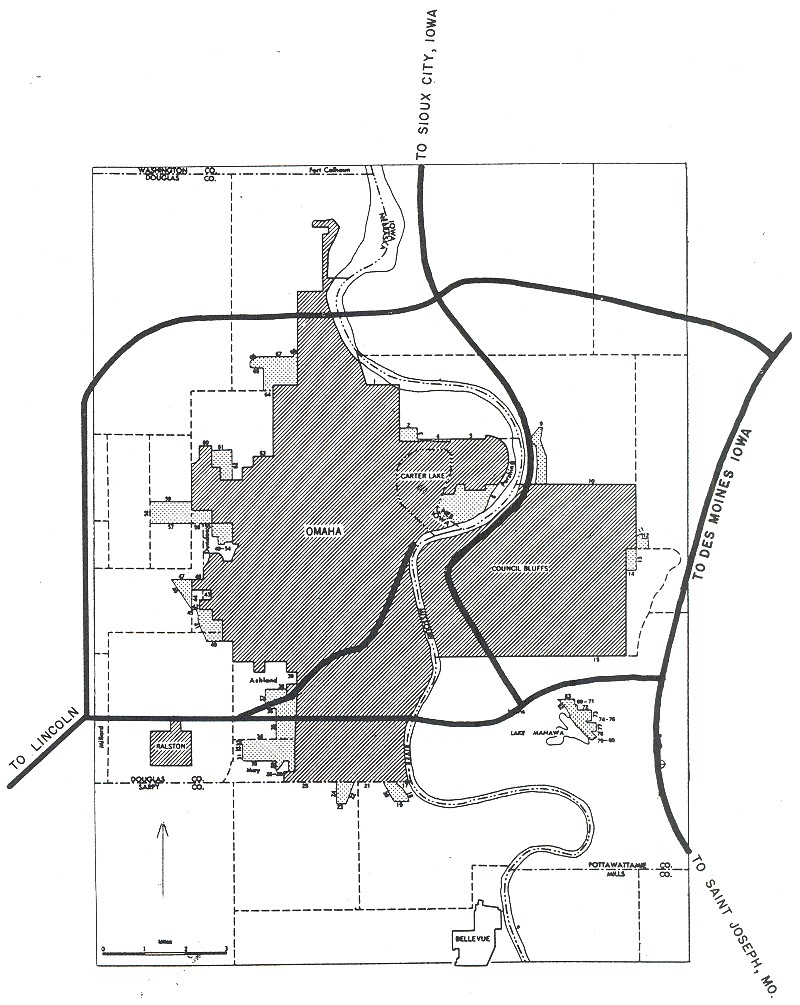
1955 Yellow Book map of Omaha

In 1955 the Omaha Cardinals joined the AAA American Association, and thrived until the late 1950s. That team folded in 1959. In 1961-62 the Omaha Dodgers were the farm team for the Los Angeles Dodgers. After the city went six years without a professional team, the Omaha Royals started in 1969. The Omaha Royals become the Omaha Storm Chasers in 2011.

By the 1960s, the Omaha Stockyards had become the world's largest livestock processing center. They surpassed Chicago's Union Stock Yards in the late 1950s. Organized labor's hard won gains came undone as the industry restructured in the 1980s and 1990s. Improved truck and boxcar refrigeration capabilities encouraged the slaughtering process to move closer to feedlots. Plants were moved to rural areas and hired non-union labor. All centralized stockyard activity declined and the Omaha Stockyards were closed in 1999. New generations of immigrants are employed in meatpacking; now they are mostly Hispanic from Mexico, and Central and South America.

Weather was severe in 1975. In January, the city was paralyzed by a devastating blizzard that dumped eleven to nineteen inches of snow on the city. In May the city was hit by a tornado. The Omaha Tornado of 1975 was a F4 tornado that ripped through neighborhoods along 72nd Street on May 6, 1975, killing 3 and injuring 133. In terms of damage, it was the most costly tornado in American history to that date, with damage estimates between $250 million and $500 million.

In 1988 Omaha demolished a downtown district of brick warehouses called Jobbers Canyon, listed in the National Register of Historic Places. The delisting and demolition of Jobbers Canyon made way for the campus headquarters of ConAgra Foods and the city's Heartland of America Park. The loss of the buildings also galvanized citizens to pay more attention to the historic fabric of the city.

== New Era: 2000 to present ==
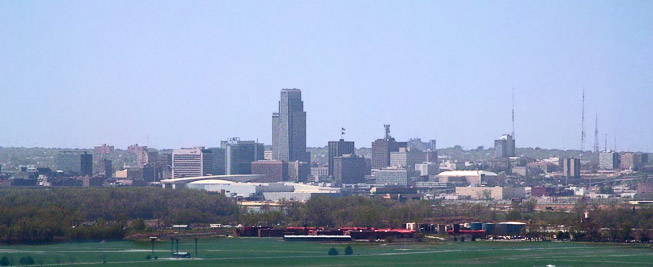
Omaha's skyline as seen from the northeast in Iowa

On August 20, 2001, Nebraska Methodist Health Systems demolished the Indian Hills Theater, a "super-Cinerama" movie theater containing the largest indoor screen of its type in the world. The location of the Indian Hills Theater now serves as a parking lot.

The downtown area has experienced a resurgence in the late 1990s and early first decade of the 21st century, with several billion dollars of new construction. The new developments include the Qwest Center Omaha arena/convention center complex, the Holland Performing Arts Center, the Gallup University campus, The River City Star riverboat landing, National Park Service Midwest Region headquarters, new high-rise headquarters towers for First National Bank of Omaha, Union Pacific Railroad, Charles Schwab Field Omaha, and hundreds of condominium units. The First National Bank Tower is the tallest building between Denver and Minneapolis, surpassing its tallest rival in Kansas City by one foot.

On Wednesday, December 5, 2007, the Westroads Mall mass shooting occurred at the Von Maur department store in the Westroads Mall. Nineteen-year-old Robert A. Hawkins killed nine people (including himself) and wounded four, two of them critically. It was the deadliest mass murder in Nebraska since the rampage of Charles Starkweather in 1958.

On Thursday, October 1, 2015, ConAgra Foods (a Fortune 500 company) announced that it was moving its corporate headquarters from Omaha to Chicago. ConAgra estimated that out of its 2,500 salaried workers within Omaha, 300 to 350 jobs would move to the Chicago area and another 1,000 would be eliminated. It was initially unclear what would happen to ConAgra's downtown corporate campus.

== Historic Landmarks ==
Omaha has designated numerous historic structures and sites as city landmarks, including some that date from before the city's founding. Some sites are also recognized as of national importance and listed on the National Register of Historic Places. The site of Fort Lisa and Cabanne's Trading Post, both located in the city's far northside, were first occupied in the early 19th century. Landmarks from the mid-19th century include Culter's Park, or "Winter Quarters" located in Florence, and Fontenelle's Post located south of the city. Downtown has historical plaques marking the first building in Omaha and the first burial. The city has designated numerous landmarks in North Omaha, including the former town of Saratoga. South Omaha, Dundee and Benson also have numerous historical landmarks. Kountze Park was the site of the 1898 Trans-Mississippi Exposition.

=== Fates of historic sites ===
The oldest historic sites in Omaha are located in the Florence neighborhood. Other important sites include Capitol Hill, the site of Central High School, where the city's founders held a picnic on July 4, 1854, and Miller's Landing, where the Lone Tree Ferry brought settlers over from Iowa. There is a plaque commemorating Capitol Hill, and Miller's Landing was recently reclaimed and renovated by the city. Prospect Hill Cemetery, where many of the city's founders are buried, stands intact in North Omaha. One of the original parks in the city was Jefferson Square, bounded by 15th, 16th, Farnam and Douglas Streets. It was the location of the first school and first hot air balloon ride in Omaha, as well as the city's Market House, which was razed 20 years after it was built. The park, which was dedicated November 25, 1865, was razed by the city on March 18, 1969.

From the 1950s through the 1980s, Omaha's urban renewal program included demolishing many notable structures. One notable site was the Bee Building at 17th and Farnam. It was built in 1888 and demolished in 1966, along with the Old City Hall. The Old Post Office at 16th and Dodge Streets was built in 1898 and demolished in 1966. The demolitions of this building and the Old City Hall were highly controversial because of the historical significance of the buildings, serving to catalyze the landmarks preservation movement in the city. Hotel Fontenelle was an upscale hotel downtown that was designed by local architect Thomas Rogers Kimball and built in 1913. After holding it vacant for almost twenty years, owners tore the building down in 1983. Nearby Jobber's Canyon, also located downtown, was a large industrial and warehouse area comprising 24 buildings. In 1989 another controversial demolition occurred when the owners took all 24 buildings down. This represented the loss of the largest nationally registered historic district to date.

The birthplace of Malcolm X, located in North Omaha, was torn down in 1965. The Gerald R. Ford birthsite at 3202 Woolworth Avenue was the location of the former president's birth in 1913. The house was demolished after a fire in 1971.

The Metz Brewery was among the first in the Nebraska Territory, opening in 1856. Its facility lasted in Downtown Omaha until 1920, when Prohibition forced the company to fold. Willow Springs Distilling Company began brewing in the 1860s and built a major facility near Downtown Omaha in the 1880s. That building was demolished in the 1970s. The company that became the Storz Brewery was founded in Omaha in 1863. Storz built a major brewery along 16th Street in East Omaha with 15 buildings. The majority of them were demolished by the 1990s, with only a few standing still today. In 1894 the Krug Brewery in South Omaha built a brewery that was bought by Falstaff. It was completely demolished by 1996. Frederick Krug, the founder of the brewery, started Krug Park at 2936 North 52nd Street in Benson to advertise and sell his label. In 1930 the worst roller coaster accident in American history up to that point occurred at Krug Park, and 10 years later the park closed. It was redeveloped as a traditional public park in 1955. Another amusement park named Peony Park, located at 78th and Cass Streets, was closed and demolished in the 1990s.

In 1938 the federal government built the Logan Fontenelle Housing Project to aid low-income working families. Job losses and demographic changes turned them into centers of families' needing welfare. Years of neglect added to problems. With changes in ideas about public housing, the city took down the buildings in 1995. They are redeveloping the area with mixed-income housing and a variety of supporting uses.

The Omaha Stockyards were established in 1883, becoming the world's largest stockyards by the late 1950s and together with meatpacking, employing half the city's workers. Soon after, the industry started restructuring and shifting work to rural areas. Huge job losses resulted in the city. After decades of decline, the stockyards were finally closed in 1999. All structures were demolished except for the Livestock Exchange Building. Its significance was recognized when it was listed on the National Register of Historic Places. The city redeveloped the building in a complex public-private partnership for mixed use, with more than 100 apartments, community and commercial space. The area has become the site of a new campus for the community college. It will also be redeveloped for other commercial, medical and light industrial uses.

The Ak-Sar-Ben horse racing track was built in 1920, and the arena was constructed in 1929. Horse racing ended there in 1995. Everything on the site, including buildings and the grandstands, was demolished by 2005. The Indian Hills Theater was an example of late-century architecture in the city that was demolished in recent times. Located at 78th and Dodge Streets, it was built in 1962 as the largest and last Super-Cinerama in the U.S.

=== Historic neighborhoods of Omaha ===
Historic neighborhoods in Omaha alphabetical order
Name	Founded	Location	Notes
Bemis Park		North of Cuming between North 34th and Lincoln Boulevard	An upscale development designed to offer local doctors and teachers a nice place to live.
Benson	1887	North-central Omaha near 60th and Maple Streets	Home to Krug Park from 1900 to 1930s, which was the location of the nation's worst roller coaster disaster.
Boys Town	1917	Near 132nd and Dodge Streets	This incorporated village is the famous institution which originally bore the same name.
Brown Park			The neighborhood was once home to much of Omaha's Mexican and Czech communities.
Casey's Row			A small neighborhood of Black porters who worked for the local railroads.
Chinatown	1910s	Formerly situated in the vicinity of 12th and Douglas Streets.	Centering on the On Leong Tong based at 111 North 12th, another institution was King Fong's Cantonese at 315 South 16th Street that was opened in 1921 by Gin Ah Chin with elaborate furnishings imported from Hong Kong.
Country Club	1925	50th to 56th Streets, from Corby to Seward Streets	Added to the National Register of Historic Places in 2004.
Dog Hollow			
Dundee	1880	Near 50th and Dodge Streets.	Annexed by Omaha in 1915, which was fought until 1917.
East Omaha	1854	East of Florence Boulevard, north of Locust Street, south and west of the Missouri River.	The first annexation to the city in 1854 and home to Omaha's Carter Lake Park.
Field Club			
Florence	1846		The original Winter Quarters predates the city of Omaha. A temple of the Church of Jesus Christ of Latter-day Saints is now located at Winter Quarters.
Gold Coast			
Old Gold Coast			
Gophertown			Before the city of Omaha extended north beyond Lake Street, mostly Irish settlers inhabited an area known as Gophertown, located north of Saratoga and south of Florence.
Greek Town			Located in the heart of South Omaha.
Keystone		N.72nd to N.90th, Maple st to Fort/Military Rd	Keystone Trail starts at Democracy Park in Keystone which runs across the City.
Kountze Place	1883		A suburban development for affluent business owners from the city; once reachable only via streetcar.
Little Bohemia		South of downtown and west of Little Italy	The location of many Czech immigrants in Omaha in the late 19th and early 20th centuries.
Little Italy		South of downtown, east of Little Bohemia.	Located next to Little Bohemia.
Little Poland			
Midtown			
Miller Park	1899		Developed around the turn of the 20th century after losing the opportunity to host the 1898 Trans-Mississippi Exposition.
Minne Lusa	1916		Located south of the Minne Lusa Water Works.
Morton Meadows			
Near North Side		Cuming Street on the south, Locust Street on the north, 14th Avenue on the east and the North Freeway on the west.	Located immediately north of downtown. It was once a deeply integrated community, with ethnic, racial and socioeconomic mixing. From approximately 1920 through the 1950s, it boasted a booming African American cultural scene.
North Omaha			A racially diverse area north of downtown Omaha with a rich historical social, cultural, economic, architectural, and religious legacy.
Old Market			A district in downtown Omaha that historically housed Omaha's fresh food vendors and warehousing district.
Saratoga	1856	N. 24th and Ames Avenue	A school, library, and homes once occupied this boom and bust town.
Sheelytown		South Omaha	Primarily Irish immigrant neighborhood; Eastern European immigrants also settled there.
South Omaha			Formerly a separate city, it was annexed into Omaha in 1915. Area of European immigrant settlement. More recently, area of Hispanic immigrant and descendant settlement.
S. 24th Street			
Scriptown			An area of lots given away to Nebraska Territory legislators who consistently voted to keep Omaha the capitol.
Sporting District			Tom Dennison used to operate his prostitution, gambling and bootlegging operations.
Squatter's Row			An area between North 11th and North 13th Streets, from Nicholas to Locust Streets, behind the Storz Brewery. For more than 75 years this area was inhabited solely by squatters.

== See also ==
- National Register of Historic Places listings in Douglas County
- Founding figures of Omaha, Nebraska
- History of North Omaha, Nebraska
- Timeline of North Omaha, Nebraska history
- Notable natives of Omaha, Nebraska
- Timeline of Racial Tension in Omaha, Nebraska
- Civil Rights Movement in Omaha, Nebraska
- Racial Tension in Omaha, Nebraska
- Douglas County Historical Society
- Washington County Historical Association
