= Burnt District =

Burnt District may refer to:

- Burnt District, Omaha, red light district in Omaha, Nebraska
- The "Burnt District" in Missouri left by General Order No. 11 (1863)
- The Burned-over district, an area in New York known for religious revivals in the 19th century
