= Omaha Emergency Hospital =

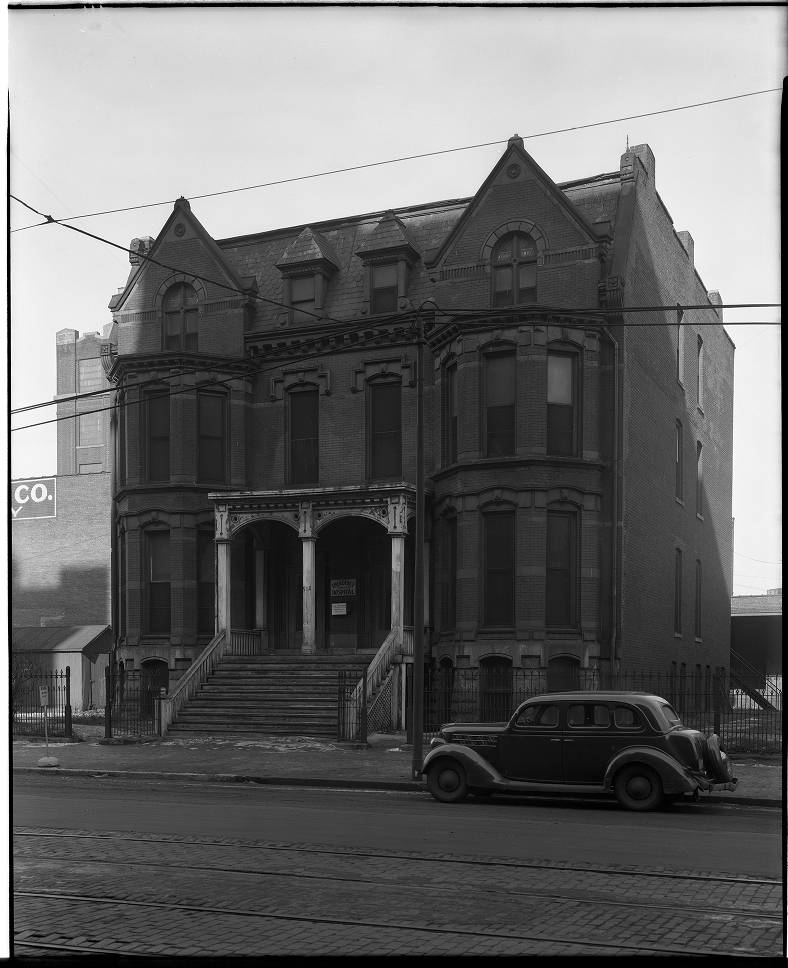
- Exterior of City Emergency Hospital in 1946

Geography
- Location: Omaha, Nebraska, United States
- Coordinates: 41°15′33″N 95°55′39″W

Services
- Beds: 46

History
- Opened: late 1890s

Links
- Lists: Hospitals in Nebraska

The Omaha Emergency Hospital was located at 912 Douglas Street in downtown Omaha, Nebraska. Originally used as a brothel, there was a great deal of debate about whether the building was an appropriate donation to the city when Anna Wilson, a notorious madam, willed it to the city upon her death.

== History ==
Originally planned to be opened in 1889, the hospital was not opened until the late 1890s. Located in the city's original Sporting District, it was a three-story building with double-bay windows on the first and second floors, the house was equipped with 46 beds. The hospital was used exclusively for contagious diseases, and included a venereal clinic.

Anna Wilson, Omaha's most notorious and very rich madam, willed the building to the city upon her death. The mansion had been built as a brothel, and city officials and the public openly argued whether it was appropriate for the city to accept it as a gift. The city left much of the original ornamentation, minus the exterior stone porch columns, which were originally carved as nude women to advertise services inside the building. Racy artwork remained in the facility's bathrooms until the building was razed in the 1940s.

Students from the Creighton University School of Medicine were encouraged to intern at the hospital for many years.

== See also ==
- History of Omaha
- List of hospitals in Omaha, Nebraska
