= Lynching of Joe Coe =

African American lynched in the U.S.

Joe Coe, also known as George Smith, was an African-American laborer who was lynched on October 10, 1891, in Omaha, Nebraska. Overwhelmed by a mob of one thousand at the Douglas County Courthouse, the twelve city police officers stood by without intervening. Afterward, the mayor called the lynching "the most deplorable thing that has ever happened in the history of the country."

== Biography and death ==
Coe was a married man with two children who lived on North 12th Street north of downtown Omaha. On October 7, 1891, Lizzie Yates, a 5-year-old white child who also lived in North Omaha, accused Coe of raping her. Before the verdict was passed rumors swept through Omaha about Coe getting away with the crime, about the girl dying, and about Coe receiving a small punishment.

A crowd of men was already gathered at the old Douglas County Courthouse the day when Coe was brought in, to witness an unrelated, scheduled hanging, an official execution. Rumors flew around Omaha that the girl had died, the guilty party was in jail, and was going to be punished with just 20 years' incarceration.

The next day, a mob of several hundred to 1,000 men formed in downtown Omaha early on October 10 and overwhelmed the police at the courthouse. Councilman Moriarty drove his cane through a window and led the men against the courthouse. Leaders drove Coe to the assumed victim's house in the Near North Side neighborhood to be identified by the parents. The mother immediately said she had seen Coe roaming around the house, although she would not swear that it was him.

When the mob brought Coe back to the courthouse to be lynched, James E. Boyd, the governor of Nebraska, and the county sheriff both appealed to the men to disperse. Instead, by midnight a crowd of 1,000 to 10,000 people had gathered at the courthouse. The mob beat Coe and dragged him through city streets. He was probably already dead when he was hanged from a streetcar wire at 17th and Harney Streets. Omaha mayor Richard C. Cushing quickly condemned the lynching as "the most deplorable thing that has ever happened in the history of the country."

== Aftermath ==
Seven men were arrested for the crime, including the chief of police and the manager of a large dry goods store. A mob gathered outside the jail and threatened to destroy it unless the suspects were freed on bail,;/ but the County Attorney was determined to refuse them.

The following day when Coe's body was set for public viewing at a downtown mortuary, six thousand spectators filed by. Hucksters sold pieces of the lynching rope as souvenirs.

Ten days after the lynching, the Douglas County Assistant Coroner testified in court that Coe died of "fright", rather than of the wounds inflicted on him by the mob. Those wounds included sixteen wounds to his body and three vertebrae broken in his spine. Despite this, the coroner testified, "[T]he heart was so contracted and the blood was in such a condition that the doctor was satisfied that the man was literally scared to death." County Attorney Mahoney said he would have to modify the charges against the lynchers. The grand jury decided not to prosecute.

== See also ==
- Crime in Omaha
- Mass racial violence in the United States
- Racial tension in Omaha, Nebraska
- Civil Rights Movement in Omaha, Nebraska
