= Stockgrowers association =

Organization representing ranchers

A stockgrowers association was an organization of cowmen in the Old West of the United States who attempted to restrict entry onto the range by controlling access to limited water supplies.

Some of these organizations still exist, although their functions have changed. Examples include the Wyoming Stockgrowers Association, the Western South Dakota Stockgrowers Association, and the Montana Stockgrower's Association.

== See also ==
- Claim club
