= William D. Brown =

American politician

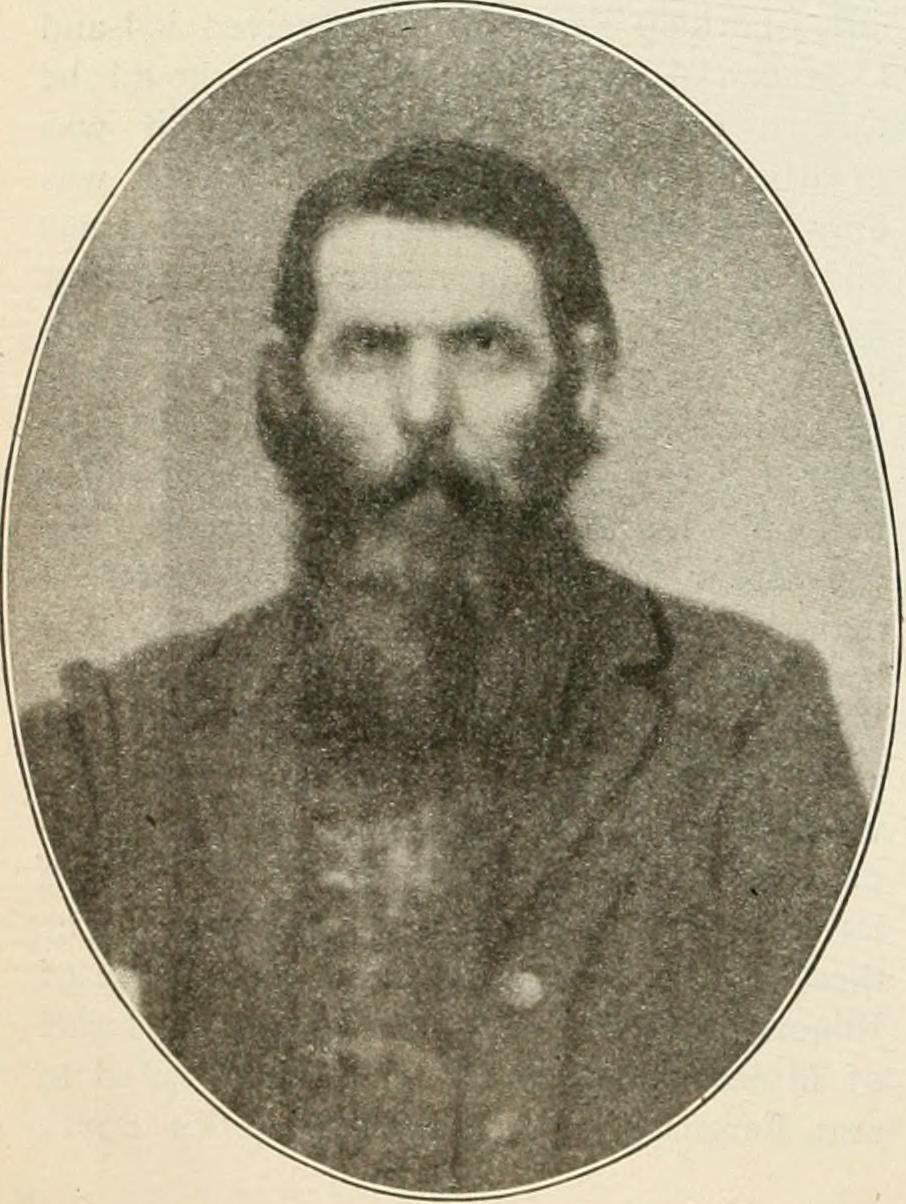
William D. Brown

William Davis Brown (c. 1813 – February 3, 1868) was the first pioneer to envision building a city where Omaha, Nebraska sits today. Many historians attribute Brown to be the founder of Omaha, although this has been disputed since the late nineteenth century. Alfred D. Jones, the first postmaster of Omaha, laid strong claims to the title himself, suggesting that he told Brown about the potential for a town. Brown was also a member of the Second Territorial Legislature for the Nebraska Territory.

== About ==
Brown lived in Mount Pleasant, Iowa where he was the sheriff of Henry County starting in January, 1837. After leaving for the California Gold Rush in 1850, he stopped in Council Bluffs after seeing that there was an opportunity to earn money ferrying settlers across the Missouri River. After obtaining a charter from the Pottawatomie County Commissioners, Brown called his enterprise the Lone Tree Ferry after the single tree which marked his landing on the Nebraska Territory side of the Missouri River. He later sold the company, which became the Council Bluffs and Nebraska Ferry Company.

== Family ==
Brown, on March 10, 1839 – in Mount Pleasant, Iowa – Henry Co., married Martha Ann Patterson (1819–1888). One their daughters, Mary Rebecca Brown (maiden; 1854–1940), married Alfred Rasmus Sorenson (1850–1939), who became an influential politician in Omaha.

== Death ==
According to a period obituary, Brown's death was caused by a "ruffian" in Council Bluffs, Iowa who mugged him for his money. Brown died shortly after struggling back to his home in Omaha.

Dr. George L. Miller, an early editor of the Omaha Herald, wrote an obituary for Brown. Among other things, he wrote,

Another old settler is dead. Not only an old settler, but we may add, perhaps the eldest among the early settlers of Omaha and Nebraska. William D. Brown, the original founder of Omaha, died at his residence in this city on Monday evening last in the fifty-fifth year of his age, leaving a wife and four children, three daughters and one son, to mourn his loss. Mr. Brown stood emphatically prominent in this and neighboring communities as the veteran of all pioneers in Nebraska... In 1854 we found him upon this very spot, the first "claim" to the soil upon which this city now stands being his. He was an equal owner in the original Omaha Town and the Council Bluffs and Omaha Ferry Company, a large property holder and a prominent man. He was almost as much a part of Omaha as the ground on which it has been built up, a sort of land mark by the side of the broad path which city he assisted to map out to all the older residents, as well as to many of the new...

== See also ==
- Founding figures of Omaha, Nebraska
- History of Omaha
