= Dan Allen (gambler) =

American gambler (1832–1884)

- Born: April 12, 1832; Jefferson County, New York,
- Died: April 26, 1884 (aged 52)
- Resting place: Prospect Hill Cemetery in Omaha
- Occupation: Pioneer
- Spouse: Anna Wilson
- Parent(s): Lyman Allen, Anna Duel

Dan Allen (April 12, 1832 – April 26, 1884) was a pioneer American gambler in Omaha, Nebraska. He had great influence throughout the young city and was the long-time companion of Anna Wilson, the city's foremost madam for almost 40 years. Allen was influential throughout early Omaha.

== About ==
Allen was born in Jefferson County, New York, the son of Lyman Allen and Anna Duel, and lived in Peoria, Illinois for some time before coming to Omaha. He arrived in Omaha in 1866, and opened a gambling house in Downtown Omaha in 1878. It is believed that Dan met Anna Wilson in New Orleans, eventually persuading her to come to Omaha with him.

Omaha was known as a "wide-open" city for its first 50 years, with explicit prostitution in the Burnt District and gambling in the Sporting District, both located in Downtown Omaha. Allen ran one of the most infamous saloons and gambling houses in Omaha from the 1860s through the 1870s on the second floor of the city's Pioneer Block. On the first floor of the building, Allen ran a pawnshop; on the second, a gambling hall. The two enterprises worked in sync: if players were out of money they could lower watches, diamonds or other valuables on a dumbwaiter down to the pawnbroker, who in turn would hoist the equivalent value in money back to the players. In a contemporary account from 1880 Allen was alleged to have run Keno and poker rooms in the open, with little or no resistance from local police or politicians.

== Personal life ==
Allen had a reputation as an honest man, and was considered well-matched with Anna Wilson, his romantic interest throughout his life. The couple was reputed to help out the needy whenever possible. In a case involving the theft of $10,000 worth of jewelry from Wilson, Allen told the accused thief that if he relinquished the items he would spare his life. The thief did and ended up going to jail instead.

When Allen died in 1884 Wilson spent considerable money keeping his grave adorned with fresh flowers for the rest of her life. They were buried together in Omaha's Prospect Hill Cemetery under a concrete slab and upright columns.

== See also ==
- History of Omaha
