= Cudahy Packing Plant =

Coordinates: 41.209°N 95.963°W

The Cudahy Packing Plant (/ˈkʌdəheɪ/ CUD-ə-hey) was a division of the Cudahy Packing Company located at South 36th and O Streets in South Omaha, Nebraska. The plant was opened in 1885 and closed in 1967. The plant included more than 20 buildings that were one to six stories tall, covering five square blocks. It was located on the South Omaha Terminal Railway, and next to the Omaha Stockyards, making Cudahy one of the "Big Four" packing companies in Omaha.

== History ==
Sir Thomas Lipton of London started a plant in South Omaha, and sold it to the Armour-Cudahy Company in 1887. In 1890, Philip Danforth Armour withdrew his interest, and the plant became known for as the Cudahy Brothers' solely. There were a number of large riots and civil unrest that originated or included events at the Cudahy Packing Plant.

== See also ==
- History of Omaha, Nebraska
- Economy of Omaha, Nebraska
