= Alfred D. Jones =

American politician

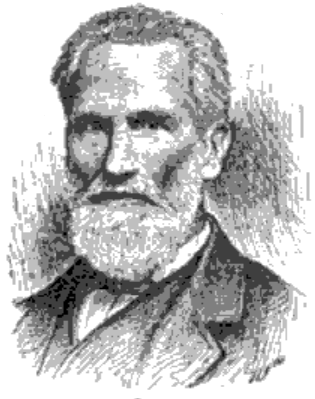

8th Speaker of the Nebraska Territorial House of Representatives
- In office December 2, 1861 – January 10, 1862
- Preceded by: Henry W. DePuy
- Succeeded by: George B. Lake

Personal details
- Born: January 13, 1814 Philadelphia, Pennsylvania
- Died: August 30, 1902 (aged 88) Omaha, Nebraska
- Spouse: Sophronia Reeves (m. 1847)
- Occupation: Lawyer, surveyor, politician
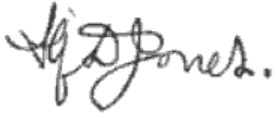
- Signature

Alfred D. Jones (January 13, 1814 – August 30, 1902) was a late 19th-century lawyer, surveyor and politician in the Midwestern United States. In 1846 he platted Fort Des Moines, Iowa, and in 1854 he platted Omaha, Nebraska. He became the first settler in Omaha, as well as the first postmaster, a member of the first Omaha City Council and the first Omaha School Board, and was among the first legislators of the Nebraska Territory.

== Biography ==
Alfred D. Jones was born in Philadelphia in 1814. He was appointed to the clerkship of the district court in Polk County, Iowa in 1846, and in July he platted Fort Des Moines. Jones married Sophronia Reeves on September 15, 1847, and in 1849 he opened a store in Madison County, Iowa where he became the postmaster.

In March 1853 Jones was instrumental in the foundation of Harrison County, Iowa as a county commissioner. He determined the location of the county seat of Magnolia and platted that town as well. In May 1853 he was employed as the surveyor of Council Bluffs, Iowa.

In the fall of 1853 Jones crossed the Missouri River to stake a claim that he called "Park Wilde". He was accompanied by Thomas Allen and William Allen, and their claims were allowed to stand by the local Indian agent before a treaty was signed with the local tribes in possession of the land.

Early in 1854 Jones spoke with William D. Brown, suggesting that a city be built on the land he claimed in Nebraska Territory. In the June 1854, after the creation of the Nebraska Territory, the Council Bluffs and Omaha Ferry Company including Brown hired Jones to conduct the first survey of Omaha City. Omaha was founded on July 4, 1854. Immediately after that Jones became Omaha's first postmaster, operating out of the city's first store, called the "Big 6", which was a general store/saloon located on the north side of Chicago Street west of 13th Street in present-day Downtown Omaha every Tuesday, Thursday and Sunday evening, shortly after the arrival of the stage. Jones used his stovepipe hat to deliver the mail from.

Later in July 1854 Jones became instrumental in the establishment of the vigilante Omaha Claim Club. Two settlers argued in a dispute between two settlers who claimed the same land. When both parties agreed he was a fair judge, they allowed him to determine the outcome, and were satisfied with the outcome. Soon thereafter a meeting was held and the claim club was created and Jones was named the secretary of the club. Within a month he was the official judge of the club, and was called Judge Jones by many for the rest of his life. Jones is also credited with writing the first "Pass-book Code", or rule book, which governed the actions of the Omaha Claim Club's posse throughout its existence.

In 1859 Jones participated in the citizens' committee of Omaha that called upon the federal government to build the first transcontinental railroad across the Platte River Valley of Nebraska. This effort eventually led to the establishment of the Union Pacific Railroad headquarters in Omaha.

In a speech to the territorial legislature in opposition to a territorial bank law, he said he would like to have on his gravestone the words "Here lies an honest man who voted against Wild Cat Banks in Nebraska." Jones died in Omaha on August 30, 1902.

== Legacy ==
Aside from the success of the cities he platted, Jones Street in Omaha was named in tribute to him.

== See also ==
- History of Omaha
- Government of Omaha
