= Lone Tree Ferry =

The Lone Tree Ferry, later known as the Council Bluffs and Nebraska Ferry Company, was the crossing of the Missouri River at Council Bluffs, Iowa, and Omaha, Nebraska, US, that was established in 1850 by William D. Brown. Brown was the first pioneer to see the potential for a city on the site, and the landing became a popular gathering site for the first settlers of the Nebraska Territory. Named after a solitary tree on the Nebraska bank of the river, the Lone Tree Ferry became central to the founding and development of the City of Omaha.

== Lone Tree Ferry ==
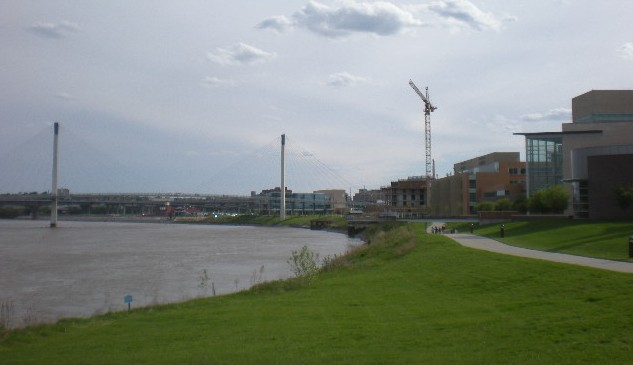
The former site of the Lone Tree Ferry; taken from Miller's Landing, the Gallup University campus along the Missouri River.

William Brown was headed west from Mount Pleasant, Iowa in the California Gold Rush of 1849 when he decided to stay in Council Bluffs. In 1850 he outfitted a flat boat with oars and obtained a charter from the Pottawatomie County Commissioners to operate a ferry across the Missouri River, at which point he also illegally staked out 160 acres (0.6 km^{2}) of the prime Missouri Valley flatland which became Omaha. It was from this position that Brown first conceived of founding Omaha. The point which he launched from on the Nebraska side was purportedly in the Miller's Landing area.

== Council Bluffs & Nebraska Ferry Company ==
Brown convinced 12 businessmen, including Dr. Enos Lowe, Jesse Lowe, Jesse Williams, and Joseph H. D. Street, all of Kanesville, Iowa, that the Omaha plateau was an ideal spot for a city. On July 23, 1853 they formed the Council Bluffs and Nebraska Ferry Company. In addition to owning ferry boats the company also owned property on both sides of the Missouri River. In September 1853 the company bought a steamboat from Alton, Illinois called the General Marion. In its early years the company was the instrumental force in getting settlers into the Nebraska Territory.

Early in 1854 the company built the St. Nicholas Hotel, the first building and first hotel in Omaha. During the next summer the organizers of the ferry company surveyed and laid out the town site for Omaha City west of the Missouri River. The first commercial building in Omaha belonged to the ferry company, which donated its services as the legislative chambers for the first territorial legislature and the first post office.

Prior to the completion of the Omaha railroad bridge in April 1872 the Union Pacific railroad transfer boats carried the trains across to the Nebraska side. In the winter an ice bridge was constructed for the train to use. In 1862 Captain W. W. Marsh bought a large interest in the company and the next spring took charge of the business. The company ran a twenty-year charter which featured a variety of boats until 1872, when the Union Pacific railroad opened the first bridge across the Missouri River. That bridge made the ferry service obsolete at the end of the contract term after it was constructed in 1888.

People associated with the ferry company included pioneers such as Dr. Enos Lowe, Jesse Lowe, Jesse Williams, and Joseph H. D. Street, all of whom resided in Kanesville, now known as Council Bluffs. The president of the incorporated company was Dr. Enos Lowe, and the other members were Sam S. Bayliss, Joseph H. D. Street, Henn and Williams, Samuel Curtis, Tanner and Downs, and others.

== Location ==
There has been speculation about the location of the Lone Tree Ferry landing. One source places the Nebraska side at the east end of present-day Davenport Street in Omaha and the east bank on West Broadway in Council Bluffs, Iowa. However, in 2004 a map expert using GPS and old maps identified a location by the Gallup University as the location.

== See also ==
- Transportation in Omaha
- History of Omaha
- Founding figures of Omaha, Nebraska
