= Claim club =

Nineteenth-century phenomenon in the American West

Claim clubs, also called actual settlers' associations or squatters' clubs, were a nineteenth-century phenomenon in the American West. Usually operating within a confined local jurisdiction, these pseudo-governmental entities sought to regulate land sales in places where there was little or no legal apparatus to deal with land-related quarrels of any size. Some claim clubs sought to protect squatters, while others defended early land owners. In the twentieth century, sociologists suggested that claim clubs were a pioneer adaptation of democratic bodies on the East Coast, including town halls.

== Purpose ==
Claim clubs were essentially designed to "do what politicians refused to do: make land available to needy settlers." Their general purpose was to protect the first settlers to arrive on unclaimed lands, particularly in their rights to speculate and cultivate. With the continuous availability of frontier lands from the 1830s through the 1890s, settlers kept moving west. Each claim club established its own rules of governance and enforcement; however, these were almost always vigilante actions. Period accounts report that in some areas, claim clubs were regarded with "the same majesty of the law of the Supreme Court of the United States."

East Coast land speculators were prone to roam the recently opened Western United States and select the most desirable spots with the intent to outbid the settler and real claimant when the lands were offered for sale at the Land Office. Claim jumpers were also a problem. Generally they sought to be present at a land sale when the first claimant was not there. In many cases, when people who claimed land and then did not live on it and had not developed it with a shelter, fencing or other structures, "claim jumpers" would move in.

This was one scenario where claim clubs would enter. The absentee-owned land would be exploited directly and indirectly, or just simply seized with the title held "by claim club." Members might vote expensive local improvements for the land, including roads and schoolhouses, and assign the heavy costs of development as a tax burden on the land held by absentees. This became the regular policy of some claim clubs, designed to force the sale by absentee owners to actual residents, or at least to local speculators.

Claim clubs did not always protect the honest settler against the scheming speculator. Although claim club law sometimes shielded of the simple homesteader, it was also a tool and a weapon of the speculator. Claim clubs acted not only to protect a squatter's title to land he lived on and was cultivating, but also to help the same squatter defend unoccupied second and third tracts against the claim of later arrivals.

The institution of the claim club is said to have "reached perfection" in Iowa, where more than a hundred such groups carefully regulated land commerce until the United States government intervened.

== Examples ==
One early claim club in the United States was established by settlers around Burlington, Iowa, where claims were formed before the Sauk and Meskwaki peoples ceded the area in 1832. These clubs were established in direct violation of federal law, in what J. Sterling Morton described as a claim meeting. According to one report, "Such clubs sprang up 'as readily as did the sunflowers wherever the prairie sod was broken' in Illinois, Wisconsin, Iowa, Minnesota, Nebraska..." Other reports corroborate the spread of claim clubs, with their presence felt in the aforementioned states, as well as New Mexico, North Dakota, Wyoming, Montana, Colorado and Washington.

=== Colorado ===
In Old Colorado City, Colorado, the El Paso Claim Club was formed by members of the Colorado City Town Company in 1859. The Club reportedly "settled land disputes and recorded real property transactions until federal government regulations provided for an official land office in 1862."

The Cañon City (Colorado) Claim Club first platted the town of Cañon City in 1860. The club had six members, each of whom mined coal, iron, gypsum, marble and granite mining in the area, and Denver also had a claim club.

=== Nebraska ===
The Omaha Claim Club was founded in 1854, the year the city was founded. Initially designed to protect the interests of 20 men, it grew to include almost two hundred settlers. The group used violent means to impose "frontier justice", including dunking in the frozen Missouri River, running off legitimate settlers, and other forms of vigilantism. The club imposed their will on the Nebraska Territorial Legislature as well, and with the passage of a territorial law granting 320 acres (1.3 km^{2}) per settler, they doubled the federally imposed limit of 160 acres (0.6 km^{2}). The club ran Omaha until the Supreme Court ruled against their violent measures in Baker v. Morton, a hallmark in contract law cases.

In the 1854 the Bellevue (Nebraska) Claim Club was organized. The original aim of the club was "to secure the peaceful adjustment of all cases in which claims in this then un-surveyed country overlapped each other." The club was renowned for visiting "claim jumpers" with beatings to convince them to leave their claims. Its last act, reportedly in 1858, was to attempt to tar and feather an old man and his three sons reportedly squatting in the area. The Platte Valley Claim Club was established in Fremont in August, 1856 to settle land disputes, and folded by late 1857.

Fort Saint Vrain, Nebraska Territory also had a claim club in the late 1850s that was designed to keep the town from failing. It did not succeed.

=== Kansas ===
One story of claim club "justice" comes from Montgomery County, Kansas town in 1867. An early settler had tilled his land and improved on it, according to the provisions of the Homestead Act. However, he had not lived on it for five years. After he sold it to another man, this same settler reportedly went to the United States Land Office to preempt the man to whom he sold the land. After doing so this settler attempted to displace the man he sold the land to and claim it as his own. When the local claim club ordered the town sheriff to "put the man away", the original settler was never seen again.

=== Iowa ===
Claim clubs also secured members' stakes on land they speculated to become important to the federal government, for the purpose of selling it back to the government at a later date. Members of one Iowa claim club purchased 15,000 acres (61 km^{2}) in central Iowa, which eventually was sold in order to develop both the state capitol in Des Moines and Iowa City, where the state university is today. Iowa had several other claim clubs, as well. In Fort Des Moines, Fort Dodge, Iowa and Iowa City active clubs abounded. In Iowa City the club's mission was to "...protect all persons who do or may hold claims, against the interference of any person who shall attempt to deprive such claim holders of their claims and improvements, by preemption or otherwise."

=== Others ===
From 1832 to 1843, Dupage County, Illinois created a number of claim clubs until the federal land surveyors arrived. In 1835 settlers in Elkhorn Creek, Wisconsin formed a claim club. Other settlers did the same, including the town of Yankton, South Dakota. There is also a report of a claim club in Alabama in the 1850s.

== Decline ==
In the latter part of the 1850s claim clubs came under pressure from the federal government, and lost public support in many communities. In an 1858 ruling, the United States Department of the Interior addressed claim clubs directly, stating that, "A member of a claim club, organized for the purpose of illegally appropriating and selling public lands, will be held to the strictest proof of honest intent, when asserting an individual claim."

The violent actions of the Omaha Claim Club may have brought about the demise of claim clubs across the country. In 1860, in Baker v. Morton, the Supreme Court ordered that city's club to disband. Other sources say that with the arrival of several United States Land Offices across the West, the claim clubs simply were not needed.

The Omaha Claim Club, along with many claim clubs around Nebraska, disbanded by 1860.

== See also ==
- Preemption Act of September 4, 1841
- Bald Knobbers
- Stockgrowers association
