= Scriptown =

Historical subdivision of Omaha, Nebraska

Coordinates: 41°17′07″N 95°56′32″W

Scriptown was the name of the first subdivision in the history of Omaha, which at the time was located in Nebraska Territory. It was called "Scriptown" because scrip was used as payment, similar to how a company would pay employees when regular money was unavailable. Its original survey placed the location from the Missouri River to North 30th Street, Cuming to Fort Street.

== About ==
The Omaha Land Company, made of businessmen including representatives from the Lone Tree Ferry Company that founded Omaha City, "secured" land around the city of Omaha in late 1854. This was quickly subdivided and lots were quickly distributed to persuade influential legislators who supported Omaha City becoming the territorial capitol.

Colonel Lorin Miller, later mayor of Omaha, surveyed Scriptown in the spring and summer of 1855. It was bound by 16th street on the east, 24th on the west and Cuming Street on the south to Fort Street on the north.

The area was developed quickly, and included a number of prominent homes. Neighborhoods eventually formed from Scriptown included Gifford Park, Kountze Place, Prospect Hill, Saratoga and the Near North Side. These areas were incorporated into the city of Omaha in 1877.

== See also ==
- Baker v. Morton
