= Sporting District, Omaha =

- Vice district
- Location within Nebraska
- Coordinates: 41.2565°N 95.9372°W
- Country: United States
- State: Nebraska
- County: Douglas
- City: Omaha
- Years active: late 19c - 1933
- Notable people
- Politicians: Tom Dennison "Cowboy" James Dahlman
- Brothel owners: Anna Wilson; Mae Hogan; Ada and Minna Everleigh
- Gambling house operators: Dan Allen; Charles Bibbins; H.B. Kennedy; Charles White; Jack Morrison

The Sporting District was an area near 16th and Harney Streets in Omaha, Nebraska, where city boss Tom Dennison kept the majority of his gambling, drinking and prostitution interests from the late 19th century until the end of his reign in 1933. "Cowboy" James Dahlman was reputedly voted to the first of eight terms as mayor of Omaha because he was more tolerant of the Dennison's "Sporting District" in the middle of the city.

The term sporting was a common 19th-century euphemism for gambling and/or prostitution. Many communities around the U.S. used this term; brothels were often referred to as sporting houses.

== History ==
The Burnt District had been Omaha's red-light district in the late 19th century. The area was located east of Creighton University from Douglas Street six blocks north to Cass Street and from the Missouri River west to Sixteenth Street. The district was closed down around the turn of the century, and business transferred to the Sporting District.

It has been estimated that there were over 100 "houses of questionable character" in 1910. In 1918 the Health Commissioner reported that there were at least 1,600 prostitutes working in the area.

== Establishments ==
There were a variety of venues inside the district. They included the Gayety Theatre, located at 1514 Harney Street, which was a notorious burlesque house that civic organizations protested. The theatre was opened in 1906 as the Burwood Theatre and the name was changed to the Gayety Theatre in 1908. It continued to operate until 1928. Tom Dennison kept his primary office at the Budweiser Saloon in the Sporting District at 1409 Douglas Street, the site of the current Union Pacific Center. The saloon was owned by William E. Nesselhous, one of Dennison's key lieutenants.

Anna Wilson ran a 25-room brothel in a mansion at 915 Douglas Street during this period, along with Dan Allen's gambling house, saloon and pawn shop. Mae Hogan ran a brothel on the corner of 16th and Jackson, and Ada and Minna Everleigh had a brothel at 12th and Jackson before moving to Chicago to open the Everleigh Club.

Another establishment in the Sporting District was the Diamond Gambling House located at 1312 Douglas Street. The "Big Four" Omaha gamblers of 1887, Charles Bibbins, H.B. Kennedy, Charles White and Jack Morrison operated the facility until 1893, when it was closed by the City.

== See also ==
- History of Omaha
- Culture in Omaha
- San Antonio Sporting District
- Storyville

== Bibliography ==
- Aponick, Chris (November 4, 2009). "Omaha Confidential". The Encounter Magazine. pp. 11–13.
- Bristow, David L. (2000). A Dirty, Wicked Town: Tales of 19th Century Omaha. Caxton Press. ISBN 9780870045325.
- Federal Writers' Project (1939). Nebraska: A Guide to the Cornhusker State. U of Nebraska Press. ISBN 9780803268517.
- Larsen, Lawrence Harold; Cottrell, Barbara J. (1997). The Gate City: A History of Omaha. U of Nebraska Press. ISBN 9780803279674.
- Menard, Orville D. (1989). Political Bossism in Mid-America: Tom Dennison's Omaha, 1900-1933. University Press of America. ISBN 9780819173423.
- Miller, Wilbur R. (2012). The Social History of Crime and Punishment in America: An Encyclopedia. SAGE Publications. ISBN 9781483305936.
- Palmer, Jane (August 3, 2006). "Omaha's Hidden History". Red Orbit. Archived from the original on 30 September 2007.
- Peattie, Elia Wilkinson (2005). George-Bloomfield, Susanne (ed.). Impertinences: Selected Writings of Elia Peattie, a Journalist in the Gilded Age. U of Nebraska Press. ISBN 9780803237483.
- Wolff, H (April 22, 2007). "Cowboy Jim rode out of Texas to find fame in Nebraska". Newspapers.com. No. Victoria Advocate. p. 40.
- Wolfgang, Chris (August 29, 2013). "Mafiosi and Madams". Omaha Magazine. Archived from the original on August 19, 2018.
