= Anna Wilson (madam) =

American brothel owner

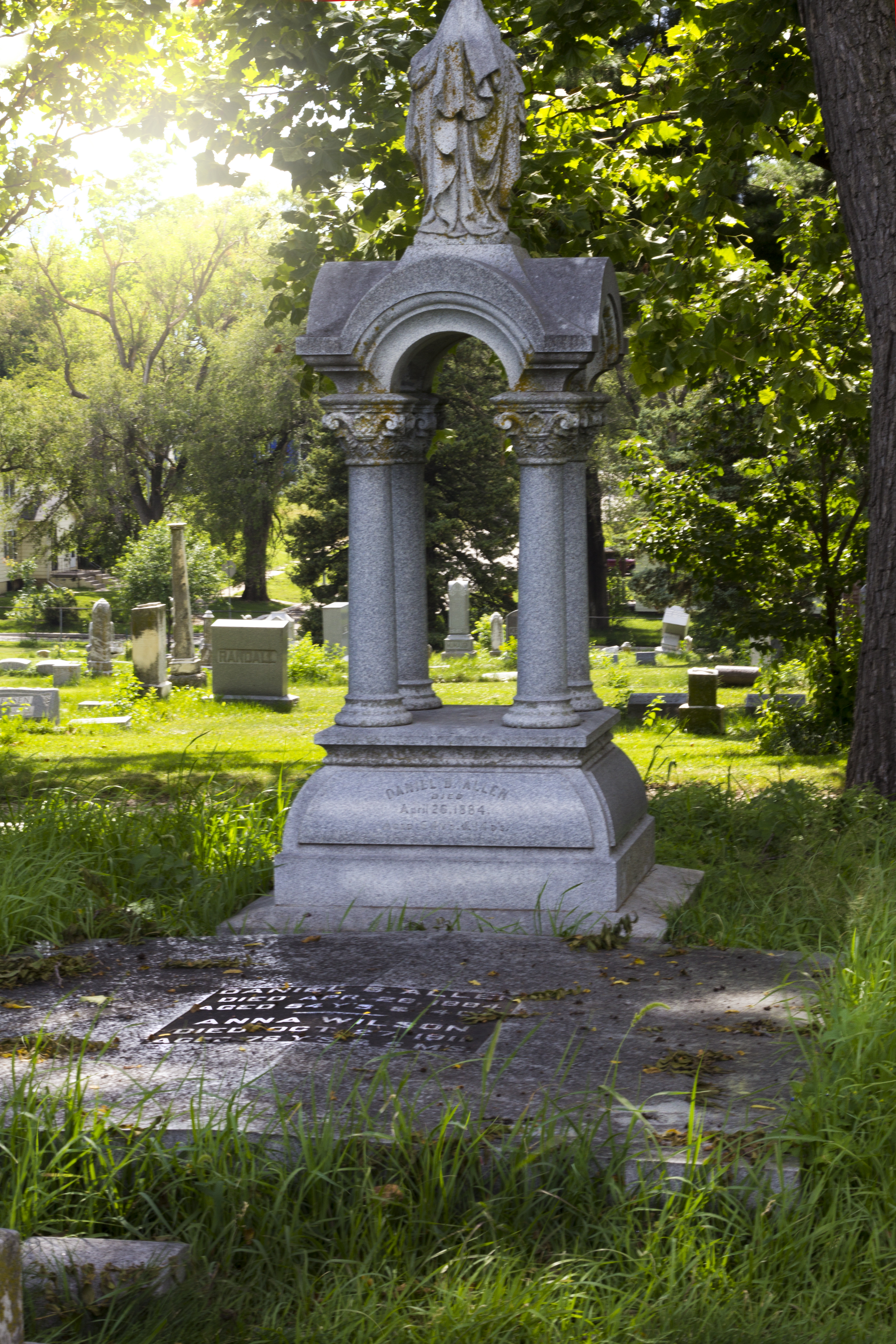
- An immense polished stone in the dimensions of a king-size bed with four posts rests over the double graves of Anna Wilson and Dan Allen.
- Born: May 27, 1835
- Died: October 27, 1911 (aged 76); Omaha, Nebraska, US
- Occupation: Brothel Madam

Anna Wilson (May 27, 1835 – October 27, 1911) was a pioneer madam in Omaha, Nebraska. When she died she bequeathed her life savings to the City of Omaha, along with her 25-room mansion brothel, which was used as a hospital. Wilson was responsible for "establishing Omaha's first serious comfort station", and was known as the "Queen of the Underworld."

== Biography ==
Little is known about Wilson's early life. Unsubstantiated rumors circulated around Omaha that she was born into an aristocratic Southern family. Wilson and her long-time partner, Dan Allen, were together in 1870, when famous Lincoln prostitute Josie Washburn worked for her. Wilson reportedly assumed the role of a parent if one of the prostitutes that worked for her got married, including paying the wedding expenses.

After Allen died Wilson started investing in real estate. She amassed a large amount of money, and according to one account, half her fortune was made in the last ten years of her life from the purchase and sale of real estate.

By 1886, her initial career choice provided sufficient funds for her to build a 25-room mansion at 912 Douglas Street. It was a three-story, 25-room building with racy artwork. She lived there until she left what was known as "the Sporting District." Wilson bequeathed the famous gabled brothel on Douglas Street to the city when she died in 1911. It became the Omaha Emergency Hospital and for many years served as a communicable-disease treatment center. The city would not accept the donation outright, so Wilson compromised and asked for $125.00 a month rent to be paid to her until she died. The building was razed in the 1940s.

In 1910 Wilson moved to a fine home at 2018 Wirt Street in the fashionable Kountze Park neighborhood in North Omaha. Anna, who was 76 years old when she died, was said to be worth upwards of a million dollars, and claimed she didn't have one relative in the world.

Wilson is buried in Omaha's Prospect Hill Cemetery next to Dan Allen. In her will, Wilson made a clause that she should be buried under nine feet of concrete, so that the "respectable" society women of the town didn't disinter her body from her resting place by Allen and move it out of Prospect Hill. An immense polished stone in the dimensions of a king-size bed with four posts rests over the double graves of Wilson and Allen.

== Legacy ==
Following Anna's death, on each Memorial Day, a wreath was laid on Wilson's grave by Mrs. Thomas L. Kimball because of Anna's generosity over the years toward the Creche Home for Children. Mrs. Kimball's son, Thomas Rogers Kimball, continued the tradition after her death. Thomas was a prominent architect whose buildings include St. Cecilia's Cathedral, the old Public Library, and the Burlington Station. After his death in 1934, the tradition stopped; however, over the years there have been many reports of flowers left on Memorial Day.

The Prospect Hill Preservation Society celebrates an annual Memorial Day event. In 1997 they honoured Wilson. The Durham Western Heritage Museum also offers tours related to the story of Anna Wilson, along with other notorious characters from the "Gritty City".

A neighborhood bar & restaurant, named "Wilson & Washburn" in an historic building at 1407 Harney, was opened in 2013. The business is named after Anna Wilson and her former employee, Josie Washburn.

A speakeasy type of bar called "Anna's Place" located downtown in Hotel Indigo is named after her.

== See also ==
- History of Omaha
- Founding figures of Omaha, Nebraska
