= Miller's Landing Park =

Park in Bend, Oregon

- Location within Oregon
- Location: Bend, Oregon, U.S.
- Coordinates: 44.0523°N 121.3220°W
- Area: 4.7 acres (1.9 ha)

Miller's Landing Park is a 4.7-acre (1.9 ha) park in Bend, Oregon, in the United States. It features river access and part of the Deschutes River Trail.
