= Burnt District, Omaha =

Human settlement in Omaha, Nebraska, United States of America

Coordinates: 41°15′41″N 95°55′50″W

The Burnt District was the original red light district in Omaha, Nebraska in the late 19th century. The area was located east of Creighton University from Douglas Street six blocks north to Cass Street and from the Missouri River west to Sixteenth Street, centered around the area currently containing Pioneer Courage Park.

It was the location of several notorious brothels, with more than 100 establishments employing 1,600 sex workers. Particularly popular during a depression which struck Omaha in the 1890s, the Burnt District was a predecessor of Tom Dennison's Sporting District.

Omaha's Burnt District was a particular area of downtown where most of the city's brothels were located. The most notorious of the brothels was called "the Cribs", and consisted of rows of shacks with alleyways filled with young girls. Contemporary estimates placed the number of sex workers at over 1,600 women. A man named M.F. Martin owned several of the properties in the Burnt District. The brothels did not work in secret; there were actually large windows through which observers could peer into the acts going on therein.

A businessman owned this district with large returns on his investment. Bribes were regularly given to local city leaders, policemen, and judges. The existence of prostitution on this scale was justified by the Christian community as a necessary evil; it was thought the district would help protect "good" women from sexual assault like a sewer that drains moral impurity from the Christian world.

The impact of these areas contributed to heavy corruption, terrible abuse of women and children, abortions, suicides, and an estimated 30% of the men in the city having sexually transmitted diseases. These areas existed for over 20 years before they were successfully shut down.

An Episcopalian minister from Rochester, New York was popular throughout Omaha for his missionary work within the Burnt District. Reverend Dr. Ramsey founded a chapel for prostitutes, ensuring the regular attendance of former prostitutes on a weekly basis.

This region is also known as Hell's Half Acre.

== See also ==
- History of Omaha
