= Baker v. Morton =

- Supreme Court of the United States

Argued March 24, 1871 Decided April 3, 1871
- Full case name: Alexander H. Baker v. William S. Morton
- Citations: 79 U.S. 150 (more) 12 Wall. 150; 20 L. Ed. 262; 1870 U.S. LEXIS 1172

Court membership
- Chief Justice Salmon P. Chase Associate Justices Samuel Nelson · Nathan Clifford; Noah H. Swayne · Samuel F. Miller; David Davis · Stephen J. Field; William Strong · Joseph P. Bradley

Case opinion
- Majority: Clifford, joined by unanimous

Baker v. Morton, 79 U.S. (12 Wall.) 150 (1870), was the second of two land claim suits to come out of Omaha, Nebraska Territory, filed in September 1860, prior to statehood. A claim jumper filed suit against local land barons to stake out a homestead in the area that was to become the city of Omaha. The case was important for establishing homesteaders' rights and ensuring that the future growth of Omaha would benefit everyone, not just wealthy landowners and speculators.

== Details ==
The case of Alexander H. Baker v. William S. Morton was a case of an ill-gotten land claim. Baker was an early settler in the Omaha area who lived on 160 acres (0.65 km^{2}) of land in an area of town then known as Orchard Hill, which is now in North Omaha.

An adjoining 160-acre (0.65 km^{2}) plot of land was owned by a man named Brown. The Omaha Claim Club did not recognize the men as legal residents for either of the plots and threatened the two men with death if they did not turn over the titles to the land. Baker and Brown conveyed their land titles in the face of potential harm. In 1860 Baker and Brown filed suits against the club to get their titles back. The territorial court ruled against Baker, who appealed to the U.S. Supreme Court. The court ruled that the property was obtained under duress and was to be reinstated to the rightful owner.

== Legacy ==
Today this case is cited by legal experts as precedent in cases of contractual holdup to establish the illegal nature of the Omaha Claim Club's activities and subsequent activities that exhibit this form of collusion.

== See also ==
- Scriptown
