= Ada and Minna Everleigh =

American brothelkeepers in Chicago from 1900 to 1911

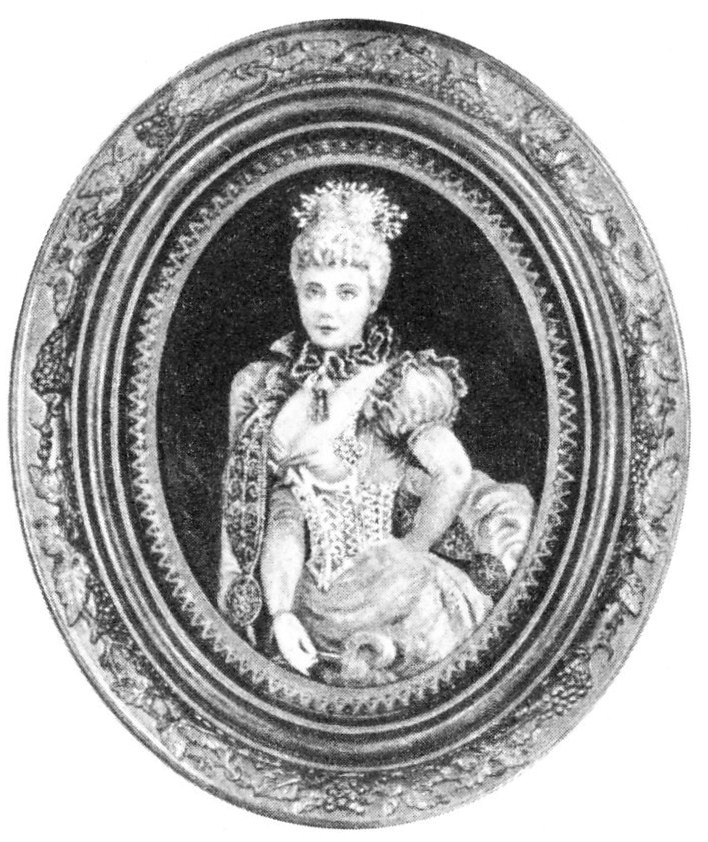
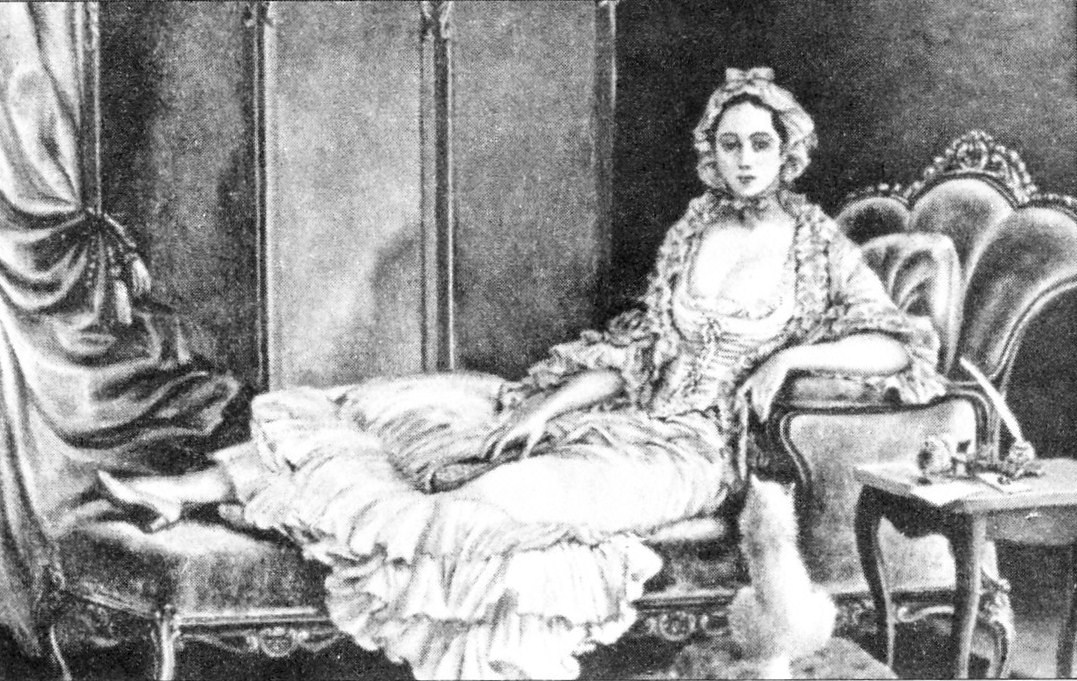
Ada (top) and Minna Everleigh, in portraits commissioned in Omaha, Nebraska in 1895

Ada and Minna Everleigh, born Ada and Minna Simms, were two American sisters who operated the Everleigh Club, a high-priced brothel in the Levee District of Chicago during the first decade of the twentieth century. Ada, the elder sister, was born in Greene County, Virginia, on February 15, 1864, and died in Charlottesville, Virginia, on January 5, 1960. Minna was born in Greene County on July 13, 1866, and died in New York City on September 16, 1948.

== Beginnings ==
According to Karen Abbott, the sisters invented their own biography, which has long been accepted as factual. Independent research has provided more accuracy.

=== According to the sisters ===
According to their story, Minna and Ada Simms were born outside of Louisville, Kentucky in 1876 to a wealthy lawyer who had fled to Kentucky from Virginia when Benedict Arnold invaded Virginia in 1781. The two sisters had been to finishing school and had proper social debuts. When Minna was 17, she says she married a man whose last name was Lester who turned out to be abusive. Ada claimed to have been married to Lester's brother, who also turned out to be abusive. After both marriages failed, they became actresses. Claiming their father died in the early 1890s, they said they came into a legacy of $35,000.

=== Abbott's research ===
According to Abbott, whose research included an interview with the sisters' great niece, Minna and Ada were born in Greene County, Virginia to George Warren "Montgomery" and Virginia "Jennie" Madison Simms, the second and third of four daughters. Their mother died when they were young, as did their sisters. There were three brothers, who all survived to adulthood. Although the family was wealthy at the time of their birth, they lost much of their wealth during the Civil War and the family lost their plantation when they couldn't pay their taxes. Both sisters were married but subsequently divorced.

== Later life ==
Stranded by a theater company in Omaha, Nebraska, the sisters changed their last name to Everleigh, adapted from their grandmother's habit of signing letters with "Everly Yours" and opened their first brothel in Omaha in 1895. When the Trans-Mississippi and International Exposition was held in Omaha in 1898, they opened a second brothel in the vicinity of the event in Kountze Park and quickly doubled their investment. They then decided to close their brothels and sought a more affluent city.

In 1899, they settled in Chicago, and on February 1, 1900, opened a high-class brothel named the Everleigh Club, which did good business until closed down in 1911.

In November 1905, a rival madam maliciously accused the sisters of the murder of Marshall Field Jr., son of department store founder Marshall Field.

When the brothel was closed by the city authorities in 1911 Ada was 47 and Minna 45. They then retired with over $1 million to the West Side of Chicago, but were driven out by disapproving neighbors. After traveling around Europe, they changed their name to Lester and settled in New York City.

Minna Everleigh died in 1948. After Minna's death, Ada Everleigh sold most of her personal belongings and moved to Virginia. Ada Everleigh died in 1960 at the age of 93.

== Scarlet Sisters Everleigh ==
In 2014, a play based on the sisters' life, titled Scarlet Sisters Everleigh, was produced in Chicago.
