= Economy of Omaha, Nebraska =

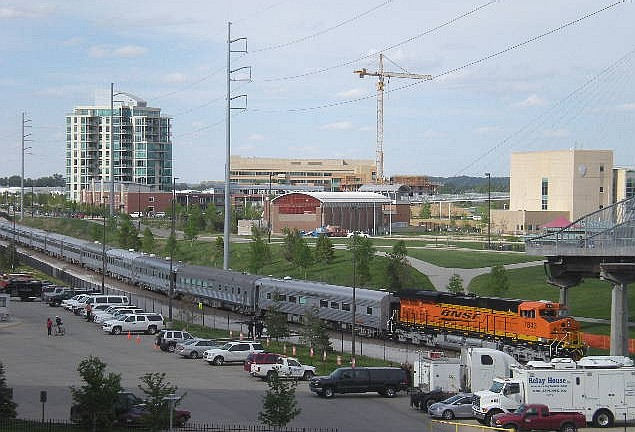
The BNSF passenger train arrives at the Omaha Riverfront for the annual Berkshire Hathaway shareholder convention at the CenturyLink Center Omaha.

The economy of Omaha, Nebraska is linked to the city's status as a major commercial hub in the Midwestern United States since its founding in 1854. Dubbed the "Motor Mouth City" by The New York Times, Omaha is widely regarded as the telecommunications capital of the United States. The city's economy includes agriculture, food processing, insurance, transportation, healthcare and education. Warren Buffett of Berkshire Hathaway has lived in Omaha all of his life, as have the ConAgra Foods, Union Pacific Railroad and Mutual of Omaha Companies, and Kiewit Corporation, all Fortune 500 corporations.

According to the Nebraska Department of Labor, in March 2008 the unemployment rate in Omaha was 3.9 percent. Between 2000 and 2005 Omaha's job growth was 0.70 percent. In 2006 the sales tax rate was seven percent, with income tax at 6.68 percent. That same year the median family income was $56,869, with a 1.80 percent housing price gain.

In September 2007 the city ranked eighth among the 50 largest cities in the United States in both per-capita billionaires and Fortune 500 companies. According to USA Today, no other city in the country could claim a ranking as high as Omaha on both lists.

== Historic economic sectors and industries ==
In the years after the founding of Omaha, the city's economy grew in cycles. Early success as a transportation hub drew a variety of economic sectors to the downtown area. The early warehousing area was located next to the Missouri River, drawings good from steamboats coming upriver from Kansas City and St. Louis, Missouri, as well as points east. The Union Pacific Railroad has been headquartered in Omaha since its inception, eventually bringing the meatpacking, stockyard, and regional brewing companies to the city. The American Smelting and Refining Company owned a large plant on the Omaha riverfront from 1881 into the 1990s, when the Environmental Protection Agency forced it to close.

Omaha has a long history of labor unrest and conflict between management and workers. As a long-time open shop the city gained the reputation for actively breaking unions; however, with the loss of large-scale railroad operations and meat production, the labor-driven protests, rioting and civil unrest of the past appears to be gone.

=== Wholesaling and manufacturing ===
In 1870 Omaha began its role as a wholesale jobbing center for the United States. The wholesale jobber purchased goods directly from the manufacturer, transported these goods via the railroads, and sold them directly to small businesses through traveling salesmen. Omaha jobbers handled a wide variety of wholesale products along the Great Platte River Road and beyond, including groceries, dry goods, hardware, fruits, paper, and liquor. The city created a market house and a food-oriented warehousing district to meet the needs of this sector of the economy.

Omaha earned its nickname, the "Gateway to the West", because of its central location as a transportation hub for the United States in the middle and late 19th century. Emigrants, gold seekers, Mormons, freighters, Native Americans, speculators and land sharks all contributed. The Omaha Claim Club was an early land claim seller, court, jury and enforcement group. Jobbers Canyon grew as a warehousing center as carriage factories, wholesale houses, and barbed wire factories, along with Downtown Omaha department stores such as Brandeis and hotels such as Hotel Fontenelle. The city's breweries, brickyards, iron works, flour mills, and the Union Pacific headquarters caused the city to swell rapidly between the 1880s and the 1920s.

The "Big Four" local breweries in Omaha were the Storz, Krug, Willow Springs and Metz breweries.

==== Businesses ====
Warehousing and manufacturing operations out of Omaha from its founding through the 1920s include the Western Bridge and Construction Company. Other important businesses included the Byron Reed Company and the N.P. Dodge Company.

=== Stockyards and meatpacking ===
The meatpacking industry, built in conjunction with the Omaha Stockyards, started to grow in the 1890s, and provided financial strength to the city through the 1970s. A fierce rival of Chicago's Union Stock Yards, the Omaha Stockyards were third in the nation for production by 1890. The "Big Four" meat packers during this time were Armour, Wilson, Cudahy, and Swift. There were several breweries established throughout the city during this period. In 1947 they were second only to Chicago in worldwide ratings. Omaha overtook Chicago as the U.S.'s largest livestock market and meat packing industry center in 1955, a title which it held until 1971. The 116-year-old institution closed in 1999.

==== Businesses ====
There were several small-scale meatpacking operations in Omaha during this period. Large plants in Omaha included Armour, Cudahy, Swift and Morris, along with several smaller companies. All together they employed over 13,000 men by the 1950s.

=== Transportation ===
The Missouri River provided the initial source of revenue for young Omaha, as fur trappers such as Manuel Lisa used the area to build their inland empires with local Native American tribes. As steamboats started pouring in goods manufactured in the Eastern United States, thousands of tons of goods came through the city. However, the problem of transporting materials for the growing Midwestern United States needed to be addressed, which luckily opened the doorways to the city's major growth engine in its earliest years. The second period of growth in Omaha, from approximately 1865 through the 1880s, is attributed solely to the city's railroad connections, which drew almost all significant rail traffic from the Pacific Northwest through the area. By the 1870s, Omaha had seven major rail lines.

Major bus lines and airlines have traveled through the city for almost 100 years. Several major highways and bridges come into the city as well.

=== Businesspeople ===
Early businesspeople who were important to the growth and development of the city include a variety of bankers, investors, promoters, lawyers, and entrepreneurs. Omaha is said to have been founded by William D. Brown, the entrepreneur behind the Lone Tree Ferry which brought settlers across from Council Bluffs, Iowa. Alfred D. Jones was a surveyor and lawyer who first platted the city. Later the brothers Edward and John A. Creighton traveled west from their native Ohio planting telegraph wires along the way. Their contributions to the city's growth were innumerable, with varied backgrounds in banking, investing and philanthropy. Similarly, the Kountze family's impact on the city was immense. Augustus and his brother Herman founded the bank that became the First National Bank of Omaha, which today is the largest independent bank in the U.S., and is still headquartered in Omaha. Gilbert Hitchcock and Edward Rosewater were among the many influential newspaper editors in the city, founding empires that promoted, molded and drove economic development. Frederick Krug, Frederick Metz and Gottlieb Storz were all early beer brewers, with counterparts in the meatpacking industry included Edward Cudahy, Sr. among others.

== Current economic sectors and industries ==
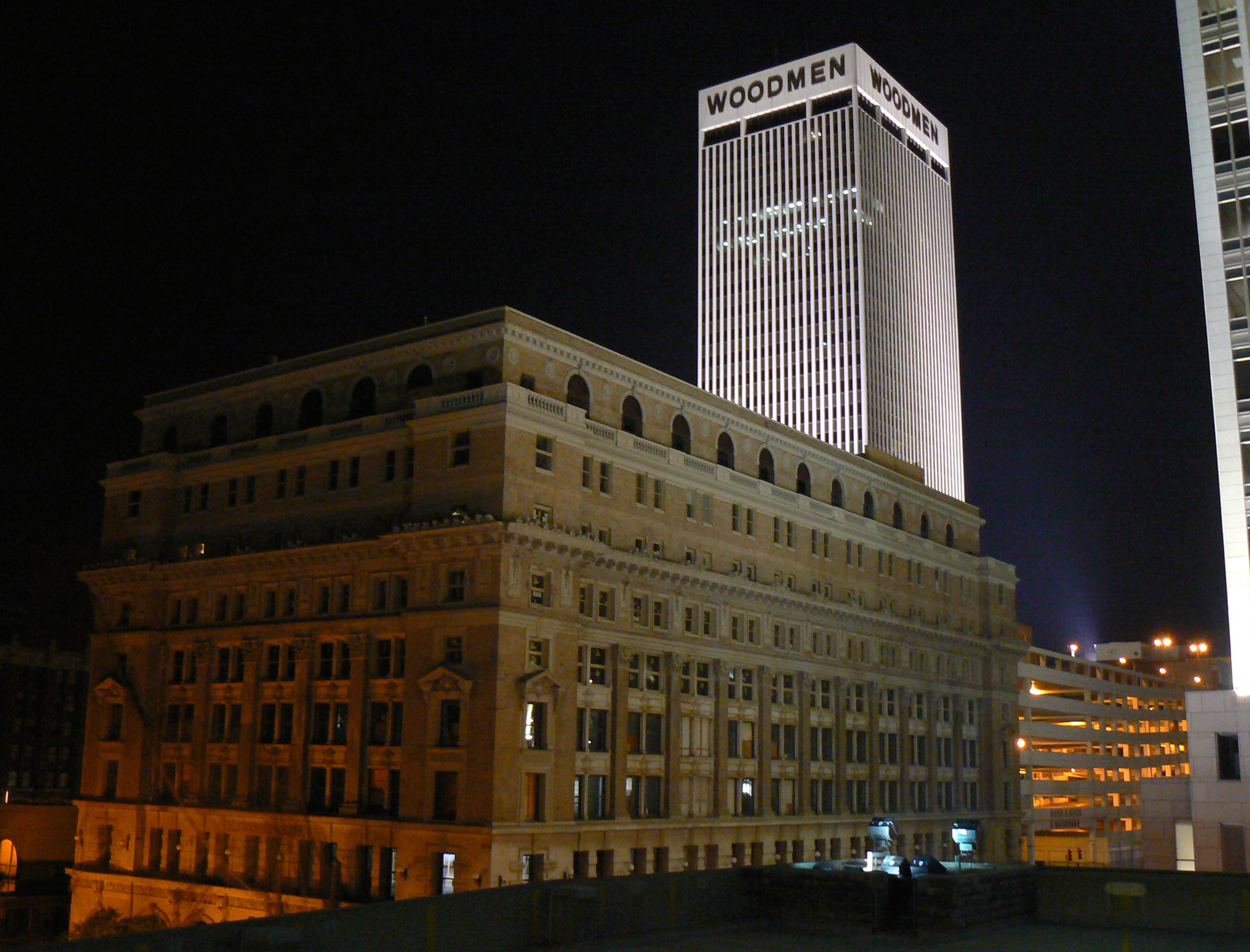
The Woodmen Tower and the Brandeis Building in Downtown Omaha

Currently, the service sector accounts for approximately 40 percent of total employment in Omaha. Other key sectors in the city include trade, transportation and utilities, finance, insurance, and real estate. Telecommunications and architecture/construction are also major influences on the city's local economy. The Greater Omaha Economic Development Partnership identifies the defense industry, manufacturing, and information technology as important areas as well.

The presence of the Strategic Air Command during the Cold War and the U.S. Strategic Command has led to a strong defense industry. The city's transportation has been vital to its growth, with more than 144 million pounds of cargo passing through Eppley Airfield in 2004. The Union Pacific and several other major railroads provide freight service coordinated with many trucking companies serving the metropolitan area.

Studies also show that the Holland Foundation, which is based in Omaha, is one of the nation's most generous philanthropic foundations.

=== Finance and insurance ===
The insurance industry has also been important to the city's fiscal well-being, while its finance and real estate sectors have been less-so than the nation as a whole. The nation's largest privately held bank, First National Bank of Omaha, as well as Fortune 1000 financial services companies Berkshire Hathaway and Mutual of Omaha make Omaha one of the highest density clusters of the country's financial sector. In addition, insurance companies based in Omaha include Blue Cross Blue Shield of Nebraska, Physicians Mutual, Woodmen of the World, and Berkshire Hathaway subsidiaries National Indemnity Company, and Central States Indemnity.

=== Telecommunications and information technology ===
According to Newsweek magazine, "Omaha is where the blue-collar work of the information economy is done. Phones are answered, money is counted, and data are processed. Six national fiber optic networks converge here."

The telecommunications industry has gravitated to Omaha over the last 30 years. After the U.S. government relocated the Strategic Air Command here following World War II, the city became home to one of the world's most advanced and secure phone systems. Other factors in the city's success include the city's location in the Central Time Zone, making it more convenient to call either coast during the work day, as well as local speech patterns, described as "pure American," making it easily understood everywhere. Nebraska state regulators granted local phone companies wide latitude to deploy new services rapidly. Furthermore, Omaha's Metropolitan Community College created telecommunications-related courses and training programs. Since the early 1980s, several large hotel and travel reservation operations, including those for Marriott, Hyatt, Radisson and Westin hotels as well as the traffic information center for Greyhound Bus Lines, have all been located in the city. After the AT&T breakup, US West, the phone company whose 14-state territory includes Nebraska, adopted the slogan "Dial 800 and get Omaha" to promote its services. Worldwide telecommunications company West Corporation was founded in Omaha in 1986, and it is currently still headquartered there. Other nationwide companies with major call center operations located in Omaha include PayPal, Cox Communications, and Aflac.

Omaha was one of the first U.S. cities to develop a fiber optic network. Over the past 10 years, its telecommunications foundation has expanded into a thriving information technology sector. Today, the city has several educational facilities focused on information technology and telecommunications, including the University of Nebraska–Lincoln's Peter Kiewit Institute, Creighton University's Joe Ricketts Center in Electronic Commerce and Database Marketing, the Creighton Institute of Information Technology Management, and programs at Bellevue University.

=== Companies ===
The Omaha metropolitan area's largest employer is the Offutt Air Force Base, which employs over 10,000 military and civilian workers. Its second-largest is Alegent Health, with approximately 7,500 employees, followed by Omaha Public Schools and First Data Corporation, each with approximately 7,000 employees. Other major employers in the Omaha area include Methodist Health System, Mutual of Omaha, ConAgra Foods, Nebraska Health System, Odyssey Staffing Inc., Staff Mid-America, and the West Corporation.

=== Businesspeople ===
According to USA Today, Omaha is ranked eighth among the nation's 50 largest cities in both per-capita billionaires and Fortune 500 companies. Warren Buffett, nicknamed the "Oracle of Omaha", was ranked as the richest people in the world in 2017. Other influential businesspeople in the area include Cathy Hughes, owner of Radio One.

=== Retail ===
Omaha is home to three major shopping malls: Westroads Mall, Oak View Mall, and Village Pointe, an outdoor shopping mall located in far west Omaha. Village Pointe houses some of Omaha's finer national retailers, such as Coach, Inc. and Apple Inc. Shadow Lake Towne Center is another large scale outdoor shopping mall located in the suburb of Papillion. Several smaller scale shopping centers are located throughout the city. One Pacific Place and Regency Court Mall are upscale shopping centers in the Regency neighborhood. Borsheim's Fine Jewelry 62,500-square-foot (5,810 m^{2}) store is located in Regency Court Mall. Sorensen Park Plaza, Aksarben Village, Midtown Crossing, and Rockbrook Village are other major shopping centers in the Omaha area.

Located on 72nd and Dodge, Nebraska Furniture Mart is the largest home furnishings store in North America.

The Target Corporation entered the hypermarket format in 1995 by opening its first SuperTarget store in Omaha.

Although Downtown Omaha was once the city's major retail district, most retail locations are now located in Midtown and West Omaha. However, the Old Market District has several local specialty shops and clothing stores and boutiques. The NoDo development has brought national retailers back to downtown with Urban Outfitters and American Apparel opening in the Slowdown development.

The neighborhoods of Benson, Dundee, and South Omaha all have main street retail districts.

=== Headquarters ===
Omaha is home to four companies listed on the Fortune 500 list: Berkshire Hathaway (#12), Union Pacific (#151), Peter Kiewit and Sons, Inc. (#446), and Mutual of Omaha (#489). Omaha is also the headquarters of several other major corporations, including The Gallup Organization, Physicians Mutual, Werner Enterprises, and First National Bank of Omaha. Many large technology firms have major operations or operational headquarters in Omaha as well. Those include First Data, PayPal, and LinkedIn. The city is home to three of the 30 largest architecture firms in the United States: HDR, Inc., DLR Group, Inc., and Leo A. Daly Co. The Lozier Corporation, West Corporation, ITI Marketing Services, Omaha Steaks, Pamida, Oriental Trading Company, Valmont Industries, First Comp Insurance, Hayneedle, and Godfather's Pizza are based in the city themselves

=== Current urban growth ===
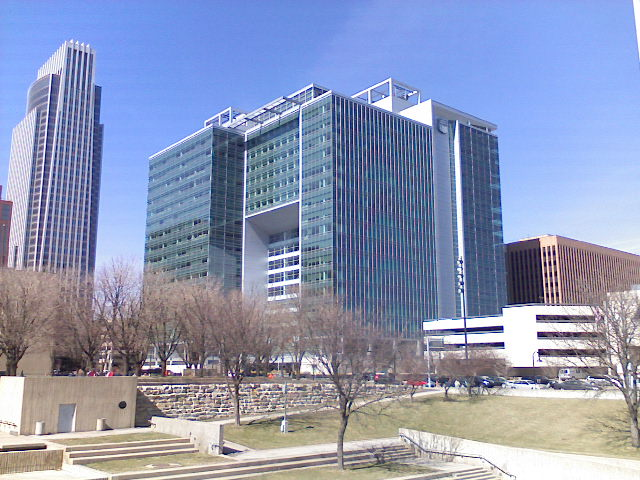
The new Union Pacific Center in downtown

The city recently has experienced a large amount of economic growth. In its downtown area, the Omaha World-Herald's Freedom Center, the First National Bank Tower, the CenturyLink Center Omaha, and the Gallup University campus have each been identified as central to the city's revitalization efforts. WallStreet Tower Omaha was a planned downtown addition that would have been the city's third tallest building. The Missouri River waterfront development project features a pedestrian bridge connecting Omaha and Council Bluffs, Iowa. Also, there are two condominium towers and an area for both retail and restaurants. Redevelopment has been ongoing in the north downtown area, with interest piquing after the recent announcement of a new downtown baseball stadium for the College World Series in the area.

In West Omaha — parts of which were covered in cornfields as recently as 2002, several commercial districts and high wealth neighborhoods have developed. A mixed-use development in the southwest portion of the city called Coventry will be a complex of mansions, commercial development, and retail/restaurants. Projects are also under way for improving North Omaha. In the Midtown area, Mutual of Omaha is redeveloping an area bordering 31st to 33rd streets and Dodge to Harney streets that is called Midtown Crossing at Turner Park. Featuring condominiums, apartments and an Element Hotel, The area will also host an urban style movie theater with restaurant and bar/club included, a grocery store, restaurants, a dry cleaners, a health club and other shops and services. After renovating and expanding the public Turner Park, the development seeks to become a catalyst for further redevelopment in the area. Another mixed-use project in Midtown is situated on the site of the former Ak-Sar-Ben Colesium. Aksarben Village is a huge complex consisting of University of Nebraska Omaha's Aksarben Campus containing learning centers and dorms, Blue Cross and Blue Shield of NE's new Headquarters, First Data's Omaha offices, a neighborhood grocer, restaurants, shops, a hotel, lounges, bars, clubs, a movie theater, residential areas, and several other medium and small business offices.

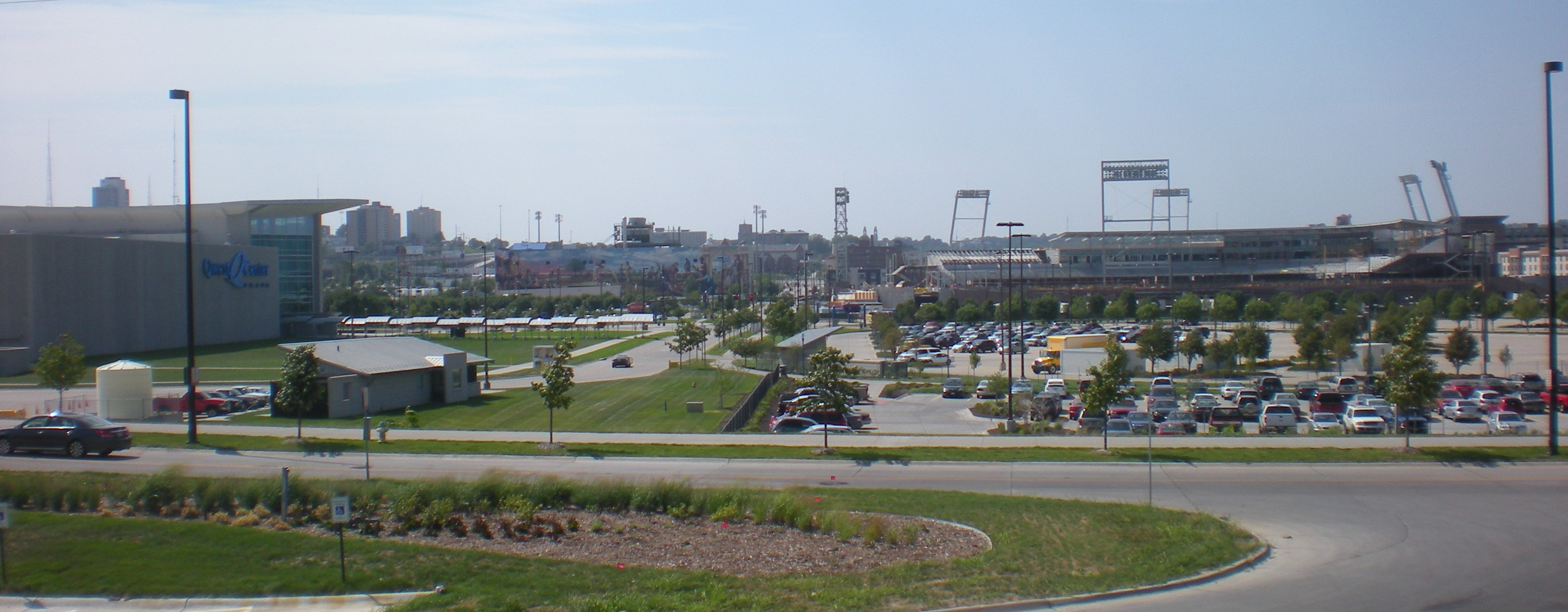
Charles Schwab Field Omaha being built next to the CenturyLink Center Omaha in Downtown.

Also, in 2009, Omaha released a new master plan for Downtown's development over the next 30 years. It divides several unique districts, The Downtown Center, North Downtown, the Entertainment district, the North and South Riverfront, the Joslyn District, The Park East/Farnam District, and the Old Market District. The Entertainment district includes the CenturyLink Center Omaha and the Charles Schwab Field Omaha. Also, there is a proposed area for several soccer or baseball fields. A large Part of the new Master Plan is the prediction of 8 new office towers in the next 30 years.

Another positive economic note for Omaha is that out of all major U.S. cites, it was least affected by the 2008 economic recession.

=== Current poverty and economic isolation ===
Census data in Douglas County from 2000 shows more than 7,800 families living below the poverty line. This is about 6.7 percent of families. In 2007, the director of a statewide poverty advocacy group was quoted as saying, "In Omaha, you start talking about low-income issues, people assume you’re talking about minority issues..." As of October 2007, the city of Omaha, the 42nd largest in the country, has the fifth-highest percentage of low-income African Americans in the country.

== See also ==
- Railroads in Omaha
- List of technology companies based in Omaha
- Transportation in Omaha
- Gambling in Omaha, Nebraska
- Hotels in Omaha (category)
- Mass media in Omaha (category)
- Shopping malls in Omaha (category)
- Tourist attractions in Omaha (category)
