= Germans in Omaha, Nebraska =

Ethnic group in Omaha, Nebraska, United States

Germans in Omaha immigrated to the city in Nebraska from its earliest days of founding in 1854, in the years after the Revolutions of 1848 in the German states. They continued to immigrate to Omaha in large numbers later in the 19th century, when many came from Bavaria and southern Germany, and into the early 20th century. Germans created and maintained a high cultural, social and political profile locally and nationally through the 1930s. In 1890, Germans comprised 23% of Omaha's population. By 1910, 57.4% of Omaha's total population of more than 124,000 identified as being of German descent.

By 1930 and the start of the Great Depression, immigration from Germany had virtually ceased. Although Germans comprised the second most numerous group of foreign-born nationals after Czechs, those foreign-born immigrants totaled less than one percent of the total population of the city.

German immigrants and German Americans in Omaha had a high rate of literacy. The mostly working class population supported numerous German-language newspapers that had national as well as local distribution in the early 20th century. Germans built and operated several successful breweries in the city, bringing good beer and beer-making skills to the upper Midwest. The German model of public education was established in states throughout the Midwest, which were quickly training teachers in normal schools to expand education in new villages.

Valentin J. Peter (1875-1960), editor of the German-language Omaha Tribüne, was chiefly responsible for the formation and leadership of the Nebraska chapter of the National German-American Alliance. This coalition was influential in representing and attempting to lead the German-American electorate across the United States between 1912 and 1940, although the community was very heterogeneous.

During the early years of World War I (the Great War), Peter was supportive of Germany and urged German-Americans to be so, too. He changed his position before the US entered the war in 1917 on the side of Great Britain and France, and supported the Allies. He also supported the US and its allies in World War II after the Japanese attack on Pearl Harbor.

== History ==
The first known German in the Omaha area arrived more than 20 years before the city was founded. Prince Maximilian of Wied-Neuwied toured the Upper Missouri River in 1832, and recorded a stay at Cabanne's Trading Post in present-day North Omaha. After arriving in Omaha en masse beginning in the 1860s, Germans in Omaha built their own churches. At church and in their businesses, including grocery stores and farm supply shops, they conducted daily life in German for years. Many young German immigrants from Omaha served in the Nebraska battalion during the Civil War, as well as later serving throughout the country.

One early German settler in Omaha was Vincent Burkley. (He anglicized his name). After working as a grocer and farm laborer for three years starting in 1854, he opened his own printing company. He was almost immediately successful. Burkley was elected as a member of the Omaha City Council for several years, as well as the Omaha Board of Education.

=== Communities ===
In the earliest days of Omaha, the "heart of the German settlement was in the large concentration between South 10th and 13th Streets. Here one could purchase food from several German merchants, including Volkmier's Meat Market, Schmid's Grocery, and the Schube Haus (bakery) ... The Emmel House (hotel) and Hottenroth and Bauer Boarding House were also located in this core". The area south of the railroad corridor and west of South 16th Street contained an area of German Catholics. This settlement was centered on South 16th Street and Center Street and includes St. Joseph's Church, which was established in 1887 to serve German-speaking Catholics. Protestant Germans settled in a concentration centered on South 11th Street and Center Street, and built a German Methodist Episcopal Church in 1886.

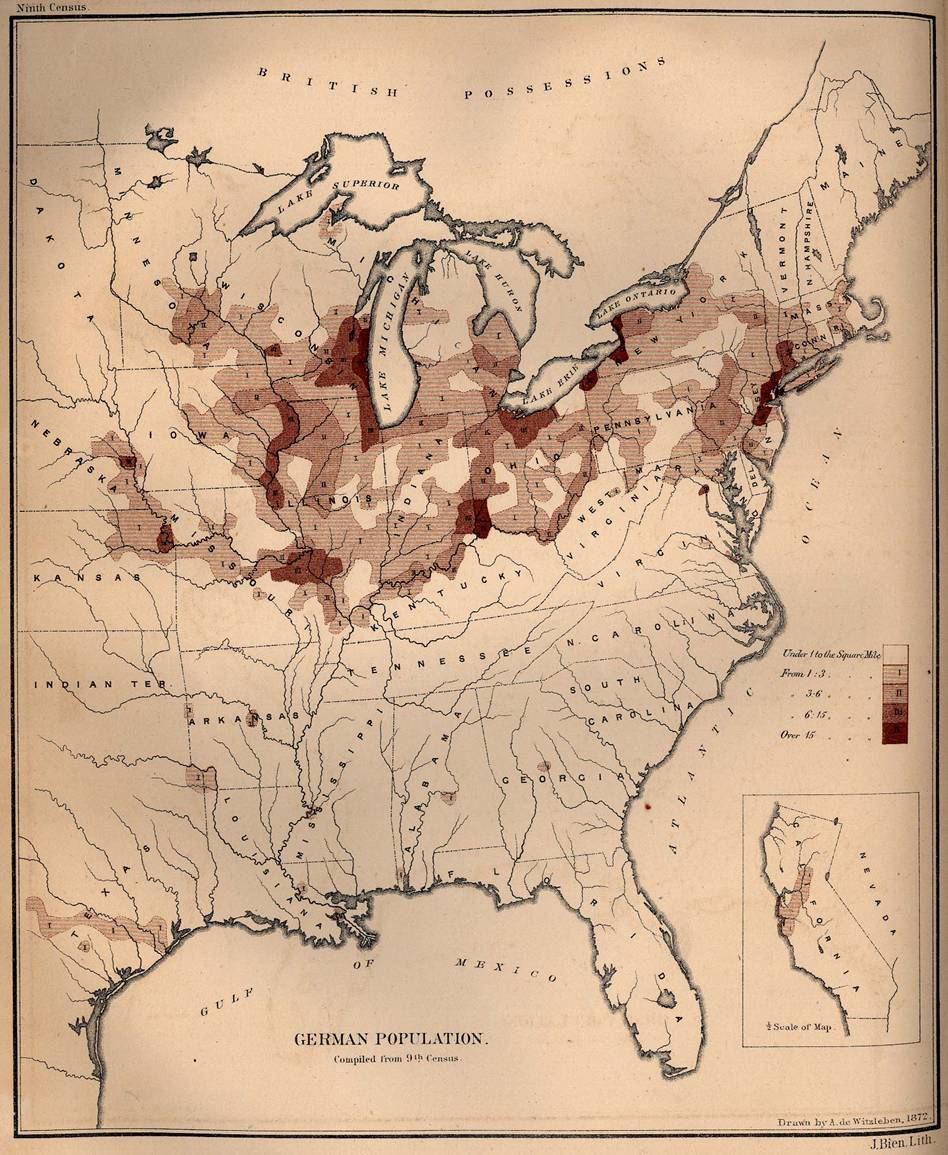
German population density in the United States, 1872. Notice the indication that Omaha has a large density.

By 1900 Germans lived in more dispersed neighborhoods, including the Near North Side neighborhood, Florence, and South Omaha. Within 25 years they lived throughout the city, with large enclaves in the Dundee and Field Club neighborhoods. Another "concentration was ... near South 19th and Vinton Streets ... The Bongardt Meat Market, Schmidt Saloon and Muller's Hall were located in the 1700 block of Vinton. Wilg Dry Goods was at 1810 Vinton, Strausburgh Druggist at 1822 Vinton, and the Schouboe Bakery at 3130 S. 18th St."

=== Culture ===
Germans built several Deutschekirchen - German churches - throughout Omaha. St. Joseph's was a Roman Catholic parish established in 1901 to serve Omaha's German-speaking Catholics.

The German community in Omaha was literate and large enough to support several German-language newspapers, which also had national distribution. They included the Omaha Tribune, the Volkszeitung Tribune, and the Sonntagspost, which was later called the AmericaHerold.

Edward Rosewater, the Czech editor at The Omaha Bee, used the slogan "Germania our Mother, Columbia our Bride" to describe the kind of "dual-sentimentality" many Germans in America felt toward their country of origin. In the early 20th century, German immigrants came to Omaha for work and to escape state oppression led by Kaiser Wilhelm in Germany.

The German community in Omaha was noted for settling quickly throughout the city. Period sociological research also identified a range of reluctance among some German immigrants, as well as second- and third-generation Germans towards assimilation. During the early 20th century, Germans in Omaha were successful in ensuring that German culture, German history and German language lessons were included in the local public school system, because they comprised a large part of the electorate.

=== Employment ===
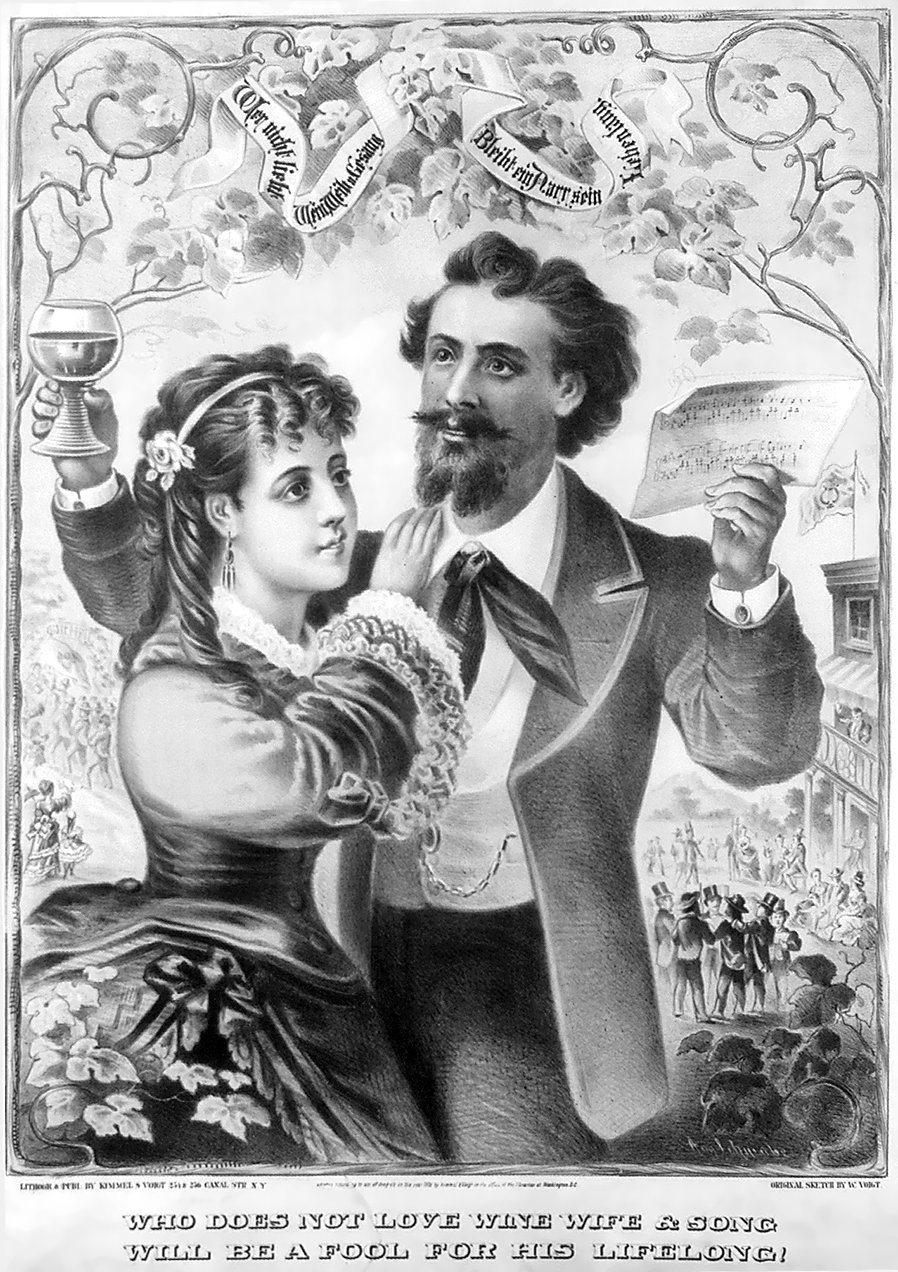
"Who does not love wine, wife and song, will be a fool for his lifelong!" – a vigorous 1873 assertion of cultural values of German immigrants

Germans in Omaha were employed in many of the city's manufacturing industries, particularly its brewing sector, which was created by German immigrants. Leading German employers in the city included the Metz Brewery, Krug Brewery and the Storz Brewery. Gottlieb Storz, Frederick Krug and Frederick Metz built the success of their breweries by hiring German brewmeisters and laborers for their skills.

Many Germans in the Omaha area also worked at the Union Stockyards, and in farming in Douglas County. In 1910 the Union Stockyards reported to the United States Immigration Commission that 14.1% of its workers were German immigrants. Numerous Germans worked at German-owned beer gardens, dry goods stores, farms, and milling operations throughout the city and Douglas County. The German work ethic was highly regarded throughout the city. Immigrant workers from Germany were readily employed in Jobbers Canyon and by the railroads in Omaha.

=== Politics ===
German-owned breweries in Omaha sought to keep alcohol legal at a time when political pressure was widespread to establish Prohibition. German voters in Omaha were largely responsible for the election of Nebraska Governor Ashton C. Shallenberger in 1908, as Shallenberger ran on an anti-Prohibition slate. After he was elected, however, Shallenberger became pro-Prohibition. Temperance was strongly supported in most of Nebraska for 30 years before the national Prohibition movement. A statewide election seeking a prohibition of alcohol in 1890 won in almost every county across the state, except Omaha's Douglas County. The German vote there was credited for keeping the state "wet" during that period. When William Jennings Bryan returned to Nebraska after his third unsuccessful Presidential campaign in 1908 to advocate for Prohibition, he became "the arch enemy of das Deutschtum."

== National German-American Alliance ==
In July 1910 Germans in Omaha rallied with other immigrant organizations across the city to create the National German-American Alliance. At least 54 social, farming and cultural organizations from around Omaha were represented at the first meeting. This alliance brought together many German organizations around Omaha in July 1911 at the city's annual Sängerfest, which was a dance and rally for more than 5,000 attendees. By masking political objectives within a German cultural event, National German-American Alliance leaders were able to politicize the event without scrutiny from the mainstream press.

Bavarian-born Valentin J. Peter was the publisher of a German-language newspaper called the Omaha Tribüne. In 1914 Peter led the National German-American Alliance in strong opposition to women's suffrage during a statewide election on the issue. The Omaha Tribune editor denounced the effort as "chiefly ... to introduce state prohibition with the help of these women's voices."

In the years leading up the US entry into World War I, tensions in Europe were reflected in the US. During a 1915 address to the National German-American Alliance, Valentin Peter said,

Both here and abroad, the enemy is the same! Perfidious Albion - there England has pressed the sword into the hands of almost all the peoples of Europe against Germany. In this country it has a servile press at its command, which uses every foul means to slander everything German and to poison the public mind. - Valentin Peter (1915)

Such expression of pro-German feelings by German immigrants aroused anti-German sentiment in the many Americans who favored the British as allies. But, in 1916, the Vice-President of the National German-American Alliance openly chastised President Woodrow Wilson for pro-Ally actions at the beginning of the Great War.

== World War I ==
By the outbreak of World War I, some Americans were concerned about divided loyalties of German immigrants and their descendants. A nativist movement affected Omaha. The Federal government enforced the Alien and Sedition Acts against Germans nationals. Germans who were not American citizens were required to register with the Federal government as "Alien Enemies". Although Valentin Peter had earlier been a supporter of Germany against Great Britain, by the outbreak of the war, the editor of the Omaha Tribüne had become an ardent supporter of the United States' involvement in World War I on the side of Great Britain.

Anti-German feelings ran high in Nebraska because of the war. A historian noted, "German books were destroyed. The legislature prohibited the use of foreign languages on the public streets or on the telephone and prohibited schools from using or even teaching foreign languages below the eighth grade. Wartime patriots initiated both official and vigilante action against German immigrants." When the United States entered the war, most general businesses and churches ceased conducting affairs in German due to nativist sentiment. They did not want to appear less than loyal to the US. This sentiment seeped into the general Nebraska population.

=== Post-War ===
Anti-German sentiment contributed to passage of a 1919 state law that enforced teaching in English. By law, "No person, individually or as a teacher, shall, in any private, denominational, parochial or public school, teach any subject to any person in any language than the English language." Robert Meyer was found to violate this law because he taught German. He was taken to court by the State of Nebraska. Although his appeal to the Nebraska Supreme Court failed, the U.S. Supreme Court in Meyer v. Nebraska determined that Meyer had the right to teach the German language as a subject, and to teach it in German.

By 1919 open discrimination against Germans throughout Omaha was taking hold. Many German-language newspapers were forced to change to English, or to close.

=== Political influence ===
After the First World War, Germans in America sought to regain their political influence, and they succeeded. Both Valentin Peter, editor of the Omaha Tribüne, and the National German-American Alliance gained enough political clout to influence United States presidential campaigns. In 1920, immediately after the 1920 United States presidential election in November, Peter came under scrutiny by the United States Senate, and was called to testify on his involvement in the campaign. According to Peter's testimony, he flipped to supporting Calvin Coolidge in exchange for $12,500. Later, during the 1928 presidential election, the Democratic National Committee enlisted Peter to join to show the support of German-Americans for Al Smith. There were deep divides among Germans in America in politics and many cultural issues.

== World War II ==
By this period there were few first generation German immigrants. German Americans had national spokesmen who often provided conflicting political messages. They reflected the wide variety of opinions held by German Americans as they had assimilated into American life. Period sociologists noted the multiplicity of opinions as demonstrating the process of American assimilation among Germans in America. Many German-Americans were completely assimilated into American society. By World War II, many of the distinctive institutions of German society in Omaha, such as stores, German-language churches, and social groups, had disappeared or become less exclusive of other groups.

== Legacies ==
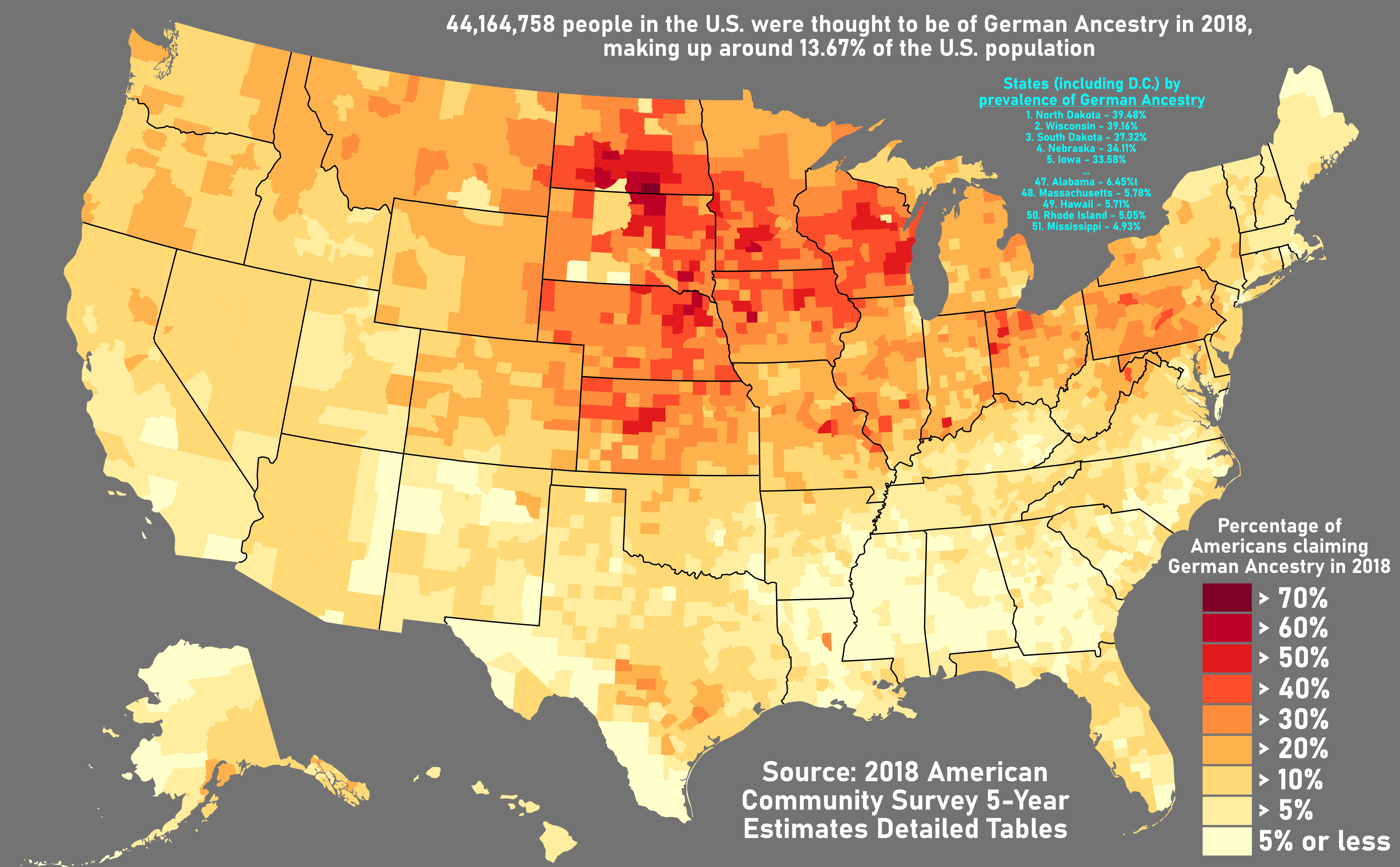
Distribution of Americans claiming German Ancestry by county in 2018 Notice the Omaha area.

The experience of German immigrants in Omaha and throughout Nebraska is said to have deeply influenced Willa Cather. She addressed the assimilation, discrimination and community of Germans in several of her stories.

The inventor of the Reuben sandwich was a German American who lived in Omaha. Omaha Tribune editor Val Peter's company, the Interstate Printing Company, is still operated today by the Peter family in Omaha. The Volkszeitung Tribune was a German-language newspaper that was published in Omaha from the late 19th century through the 1980s. A German Old People's Home was located in Omaha for almost 100 years. A home for elderly people of German heritage, it was operated as a charitable, non-profit corporation by twenty-seven trustees, all descendants of German immigrants.

== Current ==
St. Joseph's Catholic Parish, located at 1723 South 17th Street in South Omaha, continues with parishioners of German heritage comprising a large percentage of the church's membership.

The German-American Society, located at 3717 South 120th Street in West Omaha, continues to hold regular events, teach German traditions and observe special celebrations. Its location in a more suburban area represents the long-established assimilation of German Americans.

== Notable Germans and German-Americans in Omaha ==
Notable Germans and German-Americans in Omaha (Alphabetical)
Name	Born/died	Connection to Germany	Connection to Omaha	Notability
Adele Astaire; Adele Austerlitz	1896–1981	Daughter of German father	Born in Omaha	American dancer and entertainer
Fred Astaire; Frederick Austerlitz	1899–1987	Son of Austrian father	Born in Omaha	American film and Broadway stage dancer, choreographer, singer and actor
Max Baer	1909–1959	Son of German Jewish parents	Born in Omaha	Onetime Heavyweight Champion of the World American boxer, actor and entertainer
Marlon Brando	1924–2004	German ancestry	Born in Omaha	American actor
Frederick Krug	1855–1930	Volga German	Kratzke, Russia	Founder of Krug Brewery
Charles O. Lobeck	1852–1920	Born to German father and Swedish mother	Lived in Omaha	Democratic U.S. Representative from Nebraska from 1911–1919
Frederick Metz	1832–1901	Immigrated from Hesse-Cassel, Germany in 1851	Lived in Omaha	Co-founded Metz Brewery in 1864
Nick Nolte	1941-	Grandson of German	Born in Omaha	American actor
John Louis Nuelsen	1867–1946	Born to German parents	Served in Omaha from 1908-1912.	Bishop of the Methodist Episcopal Church
Conor Oberst	1980-	German ancestry	Born and raised in Omaha	American indie singer
Valentin J. Peter	1875-?	Bavaria	Lived in Omaha from 1907 to death	Publisher and editor of Omaha Tribune
Joseph Rummel	1876–1964	Immigrated from Baden, Germany in 1882	Served as bishop of the Diocese of Omaha from 1928–1935	Archbishop of the Archdiocese of New Orleans
Nicholas Sparks	1965-	German ancestry	Born in Omaha	American author
Gottlieb Storz	?-1939	Immigrated to U.S. from Württemberg, Germany in 1870	Lived in Omaha	Founded Storz Brewery in 1876

== See also ==
- German Nebraskan
- History of Omaha
- Krug Brewery
- Metz Brewery
- Storz Brewery
