= Armour Packing Plant =

Omaha-based meat corporation

Coordinates: 41.206°N 95.956°W

- Founded: 1897
- Defunct: 1968
- Headquarters: South Omaha, Nebraska
- Parent: Division of Armour and Company

The Armour Packing Plant was a division of Armour and Company located at South 29th and Q Streets in South Omaha, Nebraska. The plant opened in 1897 and closed in 1968. The plant included several buildings, including a remarkable red brick administrative building, and a large, tall wall which surrounded the facility. It was located on the South Omaha Terminal Railway, and next to the Omaha Stockyards, making Armour one of the "Big Four" packing companies in Omaha.

== History ==
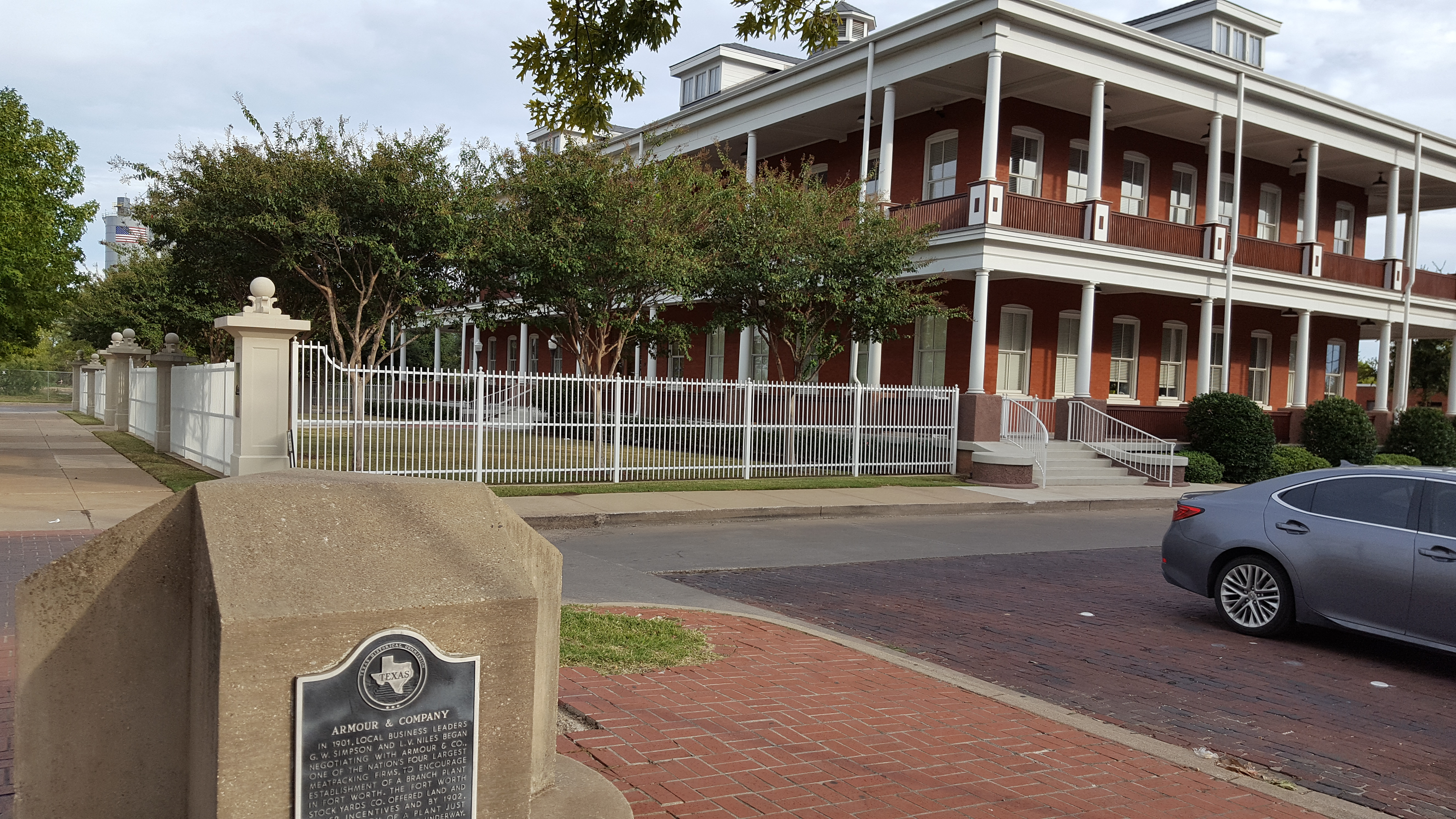
Armour Packing Plant in the Fort Worth Stockyards

The Union Stock Yards Company gave Armour $600,000 in land and approximately $750,000 in stock in the Omaha Stockyards to build a packing house. This deal raised the ire of stockholders in the stockyards company, as well as competitors in the meat-packing industry.

The contractors selected to build the plant were Rocheford & Gould, and the first brick was laid on 17 November 1897.

There were a number of large riots and civil unrest that originated or included events at the Armour Packing Plant.

== See also ==
- History of Omaha, Nebraska
- Economy of Omaha, Nebraska
