= Herman Kountze =

American banker (1833–1906)

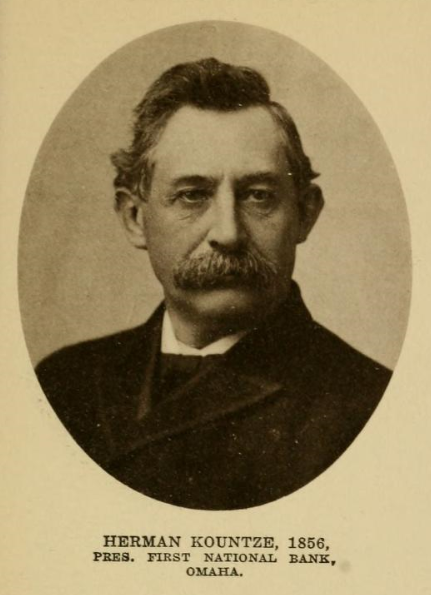
- Born: August 21, 1833; Osnaburg, Ohio
- Died: November 20, 1906; Watkins, New York
- Resting place: Forest Lawn Cemetery
- Occupation: Banker

Herman Kountze (August 21, 1833 – November 20, 1906) was a powerful and influential pioneer banker in Omaha, Nebraska, during the late 19th century. After organizing the Kountze Brothers Bank in 1857 as the second bank in Omaha, Herman and his brothers Augustus, Charles and Luther changed the charter in 1863, opening the First National Bank of Omaha that year. Kountze was involved in a number of influential ventures around Omaha, including the development of the Omaha Stockyards and the Trans-Mississippi and International Exposition of 1898. Immediately after his death Kountze was regarded as one of Omaha's "old settlers". Today Kountze's First National Bank is the oldest bank west of the Mississippi River, and continues as a privately held company in its sixth generation of family ownership.

== Biography ==
Herman Kountze was born August 21, 1833, in Osnaburg, Ohio, one of twelve children born to Christian and Margaret Kountze. After leaving his father's mercantile business at the age of 26, Kountze moved to join his brother Augustus, who was a real estate agent in the new Omaha City, located on the eastern edge of the Nebraska Territory. Immediately the brothers organized the Kountze Brothers Bank and bought a large amount of land in the river towns along the Missouri River in Nebraska, with holdings in Brownville, Nebraska City, Tekamah, and Dakota City, and in Sioux City, Iowa. Eventually they invested throughout Nebraska, across Iowa, Minnesota, and the forests and grazing lands of east Texas, as well as in Chicago and Denver. In 1864, Kountze married Elizabeth Davis, the daughter of Thomas Davis, a founding pioneer of Omaha. In 1899, after his first wife died, he was married for a second time to Clara Sara Whitney Cotton.

== Kountze Brothers Bank ==
In 1867, Herman joined his brother in organizing the First National Bank of Omaha, with fellow Omaha businessman Edward Creighton serving as the first president. Herman was the bank's first cashier, and became the second president of the bank after Creighton died in 1873. In 1862 he joined several of his brothers, including Augustus, in founding the Kountze Brothers Bank of Denver, which became the Colorado National Bank in 1866.

Herman's brother Luther went to New York City and founded the Kountze Brothers Bank there in 1867. Herman joined his brother Augustus as senior partner, and by 1872 Augustus moved permanently from Omaha to New York to manage affairs directly. After Augustus left, Herman took the management of the affairs of the firm in Nebraska, Iowa and Minnesota.

== Other ventures ==
Herman Kountze was a prolific investor. Among his holdings were a number of railroads, including the Omaha and Northwestern Railroad, the Denver and South Park Railroad, the Sabine and East Texas Railway, the Boston, Hoosac Tunnel and Western Railway, and the Troy and Boston Railroad.

In 1872, while misunderstanding the ideal location he was selling, Kountze sold the land required to develop Neligh, Nebraska, which eventually became the county seat of Antelope County.

In 1883 Kountze was a plaintiff and defendant in a lawsuit and counter-suit with the Omaha Hotel Company owned by John J. Reddick. The case pertained to the money owed in a failed real estate investment scheme. Other codefendants in the case included other pioneer investors in Omaha: Jeptha H. Wade, James W. Bosler, Thomas Wardell, Henry W. Yates and John A. Creighton. They were represented by pioneer lawyer Andrew J. Poppleton.

In 1895 Kountze helped found the Knights of Ak-Sar-Ben to promote Omaha business interests. Its first meeting place was in North Omaha at North 20th and Burdette Streets, located in Kountze Place.

=== North Omaha ===
Aside from the aforementioned Kountze Place, Kountze dealt in a great deal of land throughout North Omaha. He sold an 82-acre (330,000 m^{2}) tract of land four miles (6 km) north of Omaha and 1½ miles south of Florence to the U.S. Army in 1868. It became Fort Omaha. In the late 19th century he donated land to the Sacred Heart Church at 2206 Binney Street. Kountze donated land to Brownell Hall to relocate from the former town of Saratoga to South Tenth and Worthington Streets in the late 19th century.

==== Trans-Mississippi Exposition ====
Herman Kountze was the treasurer for the Trans-Mississippi Exposition of 1898. After running into transportation issues with its first land choice for the event, Kountze volunteered to sell part of his Kountze Place development to the city. As part of the real estate transaction, the City used a small parcel to develop Kountze Park, which still functions as a neighborhood park in that area.

==== Creighton University ====
Working with John A. Creighton, Herman Kountze was an executor of the will of Mary Lucretia Creighton after her death in 1876. In that capacity he was partly responsible for carrying out the original intentions of Edward Creighton, Mary's husband, who wanted to found a free university in Omaha. That institution eventually took the shape of Creighton University.

=== Omaha Stockyards ===
Kountze was a partner in the South Omaha Land Syndicate, the South Omaha Land Company, and the Union Stock Yards Company of Omaha of South Omaha. This company was responsible for building the Union Stockyards and the Livestock Exchange Building, and ran the South Omaha Terminal Railway.

=== Kountze, Texas ===
The city of Kountze in Hardin County, Texas was named in honor of Herman and Augustus. They were early financial backers of the Sabine and East Texas Railroad which established the town as a station on the line. As retail businesses and lumbermen accompanied the railroad, the town of Kountze grew, and in 1886 the town became the county seat.

== Death ==
Herman Kountze died in 1906 and was interred in Omaha's Forest Lawn Cemetery, of which he was a founding trustee and in which there is a roadway named for him.

== See also ==
- History of Omaha
- Founding figures of Omaha, Nebraska

== Bibliography ==
- Szmrecsanyi, S. (1996). The First National Bank Story. Omaha, NE: First National Bank of Omaha.
