= Swift Packing Plant =

Coordinates: 41°12′17″N 95°57′06″W

The Swift Packing Plant was a division of Swift and Company located at South 27th and Q Streets in South Omaha, Nebraska. The plant was opened in 1887 and closed in 1969. It covered approximately eight square blocks and consisted of several brick and stone buildings, and was located in proximity to the Omaha Stockyards. It was located on the South Omaha Terminal Railway, and next to the Omaha Stockyards, making Swift one of the "Big Four" packing companies in Omaha.

== History ==
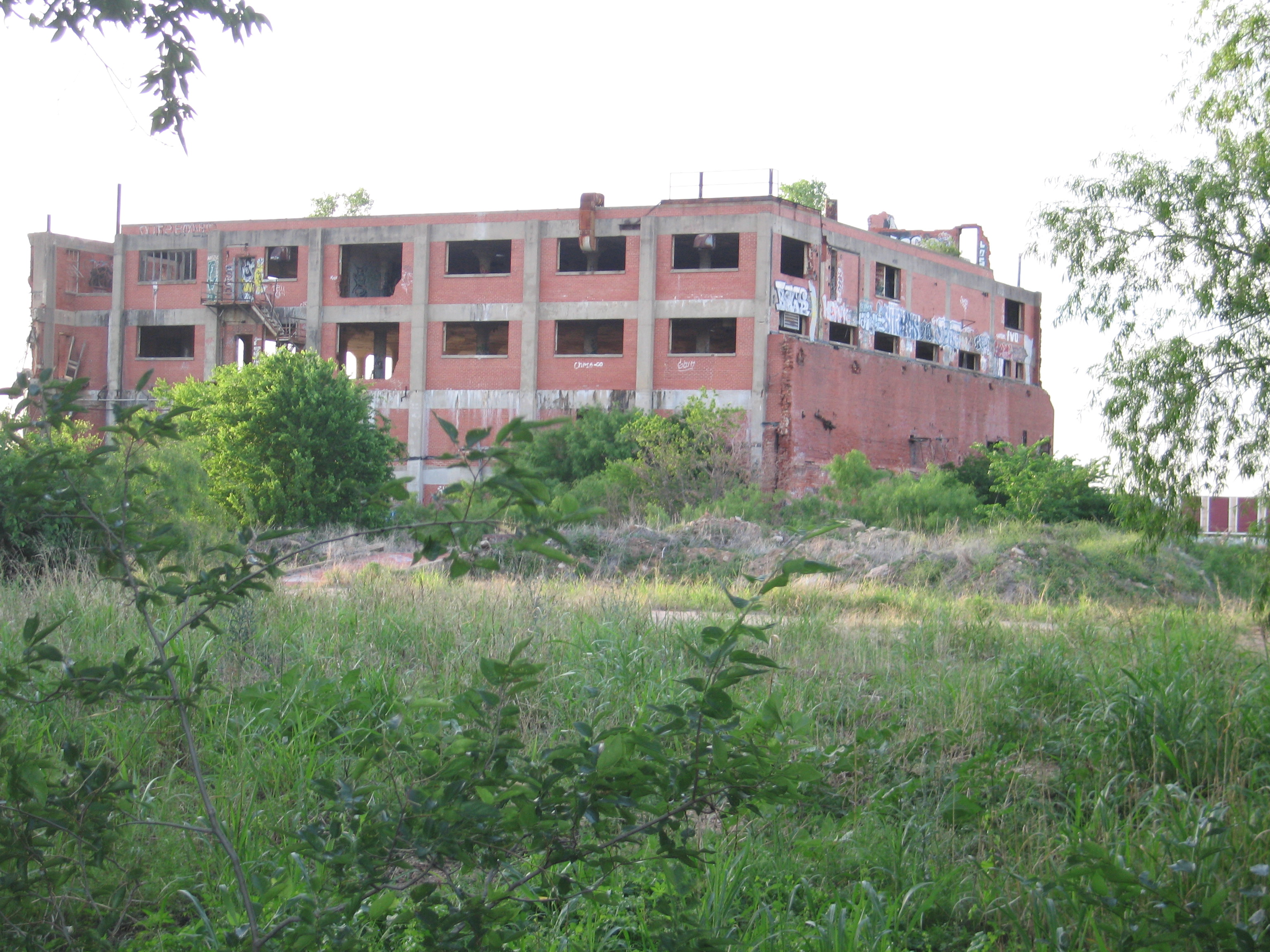
Swift Packing Plant in the Fort Worth Stockyards

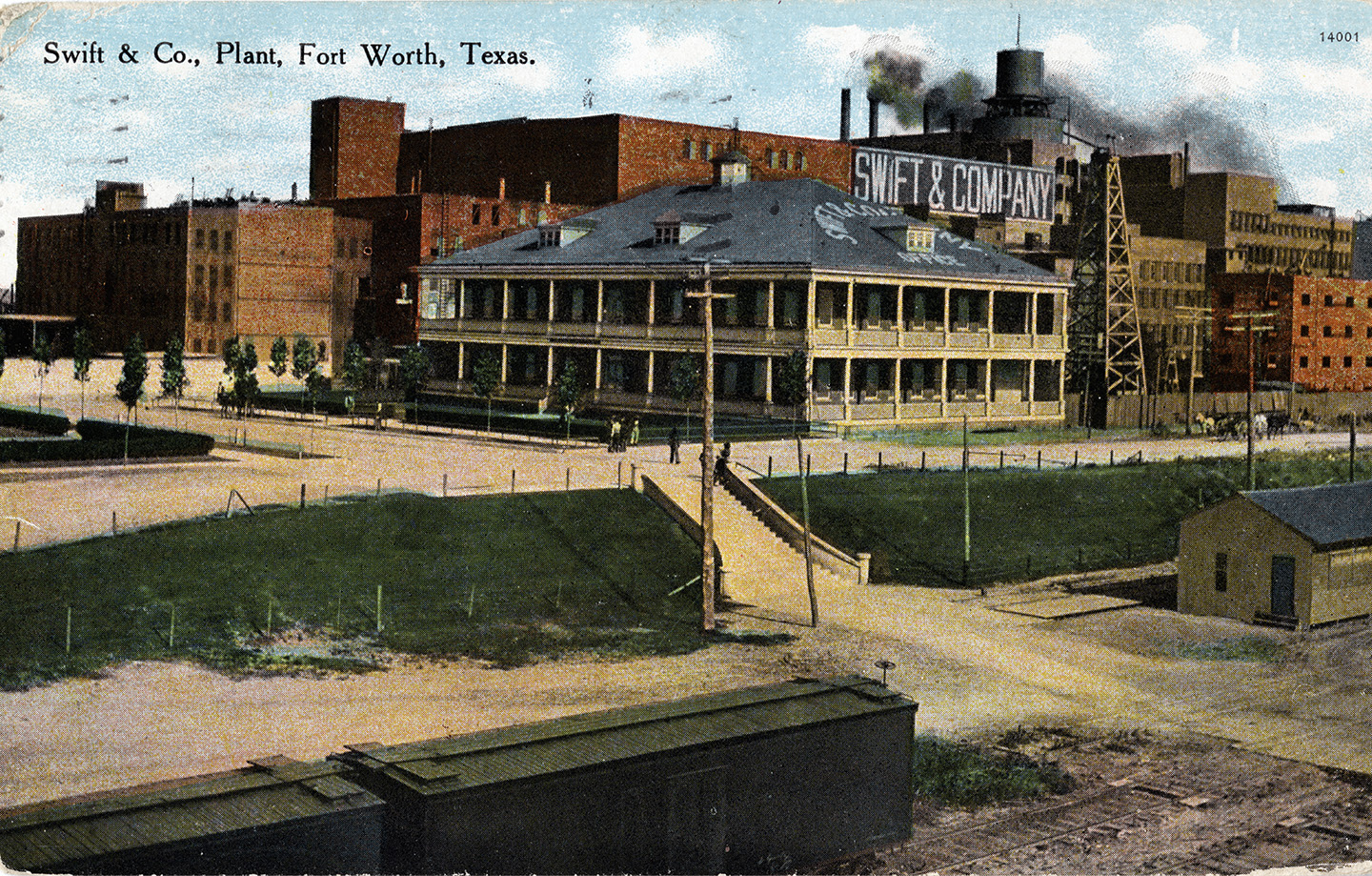
Postcard of the Swift Packing Plant in Fort Worth, c. 1900s

The Union Stock Yards Company and G. F. Swift of Chicago to bring Swift and Company into South Omaha. Swift was given eleven acres of land and approximately $135,000 to build a packing house. The Swift Packing Plant was fully operational by late 1888, with $300,000 in buildings for slaughtering cattle and hogs.

There were a number of large riots and civil unrest that originated or included events at the Swift Packing Plant.

== See also ==
- History of Omaha, Nebraska
- Economy of Omaha, Nebraska
