= Brandon Railroad =

The Brandon Railroad (reporting mark BRAN) is a switching and terminal railroad that operates 17.3 miles of former South Omaha Terminal Railway track outside of Omaha, Nebraska, United States. This railroad started out as the Union Stock Yards Company of Omaha in 1897. In July 1927 it became the South Omaha Terminal Railway and then was taken over by the BRAN in 1978. The BRAN has connections to the BNSF Railway and the Union Pacific Railroad.
