= Willow Springs Distilling Company =

Brewery in Nebraska

- Company type: Private
- Industry: Beverages
- Founded: 1866
- Headquarters: Omaha, Nebraska, United States
- Products: Gins, pure rye and bourbon whiskeys, mash and sweet mash

Willow Springs Distilling Company was a brewery located in South Omaha, Nebraska. Part of a national conglomerate, Willow Springs was Nebraska's first distillery, and grew to become the nation’s third largest distillery before the Great Depression. Willow Springs was one of the "Big 4" brewers located in Omaha, which also included the Krug, Storz and Metz breweries.

The Willow Springs Bottling Company still operates in the area.

== History ==
Brought to Omaha from Iowa in 1866, Willow Springs began as a "little one-horse concern" owned by J.C. McCoy. The company was seized by the federal government in 1869 in lieu of McCoy's defaulted revenue tax payments. The same year the government sold it to James G. McGrath and Peter E. Iler, operating as Iler and Company. Iler was later heavily involved in anti-prohibition movements in Nebraska preceding the national campaign, as well as being an initial investor in the South Omaha Land Company and the Omaha Stockyards. In 1871 the distillery was incorporated as the Willow Springs Distilling Company. The original distillery was located at 4th and Pierce Streets, immediately south of Downtown Omaha.

== Facilities ==
Originally covering approximately six acres at 209 Hickory Street, in the 1880s Willow Springs distilled 1,200 gallons of spirits daily. Later the distillery moved to Pierce and South 4th Streets, where it occupied almost a dozen buildings on 9 acres (36,000 m^{2}). Metz Brewery later moved to 209 Hickory Street.

== Products ==
Willow Springs produced a variety of alcohol and spirits, including gins, pure rye and bourbon whiskeys, mash and sweet mash. When Prohibition in the United States stopped the production of alcoholic beverages in 1919, the company became known as Willow Springs Bottling and featured only near beer, malt and soda pop.

Some of the distillery's labels included Eagle Gin, Proof Spirits, Pure Malt Whiskies, East India Bitters, Buck Bourbon Blend Whiskey, Willow Springs Sour Mash Whiskies, and Golden Sheaf Rye Whiskey. Each of these particular products won awards at Omaha's Trans-Mississippi Exposition of 1898.

== Controversy ==
During Prohibition it was popular to homebrew beer, and was not frowned upon by Omaha authorities when it was for home consumption. Willow Springs manufactured malt, a key ingredient in homebrewing. In the early 1930s a worker at the distillery failed to notice when a batch of malt was burned, and an entire batch of malt was bottled and shipped to stores. The Willow Springs brand was suddenly frowned upon, with customers demanding refunds and the company running short on cash because of the Great Depression.

Willow Springs was criticized by supporters of women's suffrage because it was financially backed by Joseph Millard, an anti-suffrage activist.

== See also ==
- History of Omaha
- List of defunct consumer brands
