= Gallagher Park =

Gallagher Park may refer to:

- Gallagher Park (Edmonton), a large park in Edmonton, Alberta, Canada
- Gallagher Park (Omaha), a park in Omaha, Nebraska, United States
