= Wilson Packing Plant =

Meatpacking facility in Nebraska, USA

Coordinates: 41°11′50″N 95°57′20″W

The Wilson Packing Plant was a division of the Wilson and Company meatpacking company located near South 27th and Y Streets in South Omaha, Nebraska. Founded in the 1890s, it closed in 1976. It occupied the area bounded by Washington Street, South 27th Street, W Street and South 30th Street. Located on the South Omaha Terminal Railway and next to the Omaha Stockyards, Wilson was regarded as one of the "Big Four" packing companies in Omaha.

== History ==
The South Omaha Neighborhood Alliance, formed in 1965, was apparently instrumental in the "closing and clean-up" of the Wilson plant. The former plant and its site was redeveloped to be turned into an industrial park in 2003. Instead, the city's new Kroc Center was built on the site.

There were a number of large riots and civil unrest that originated or included events at the Wilson Packing Plant.

The building was initially constructed to house the Skinner Packing Company, patriarchs of the current Skinner Pasta brands.

== See also ==
- History of Omaha, Nebraska
- Economy of Omaha, Nebraska
