= Los Angeles Union Stock Yards =

Meat-packing district in Southern California

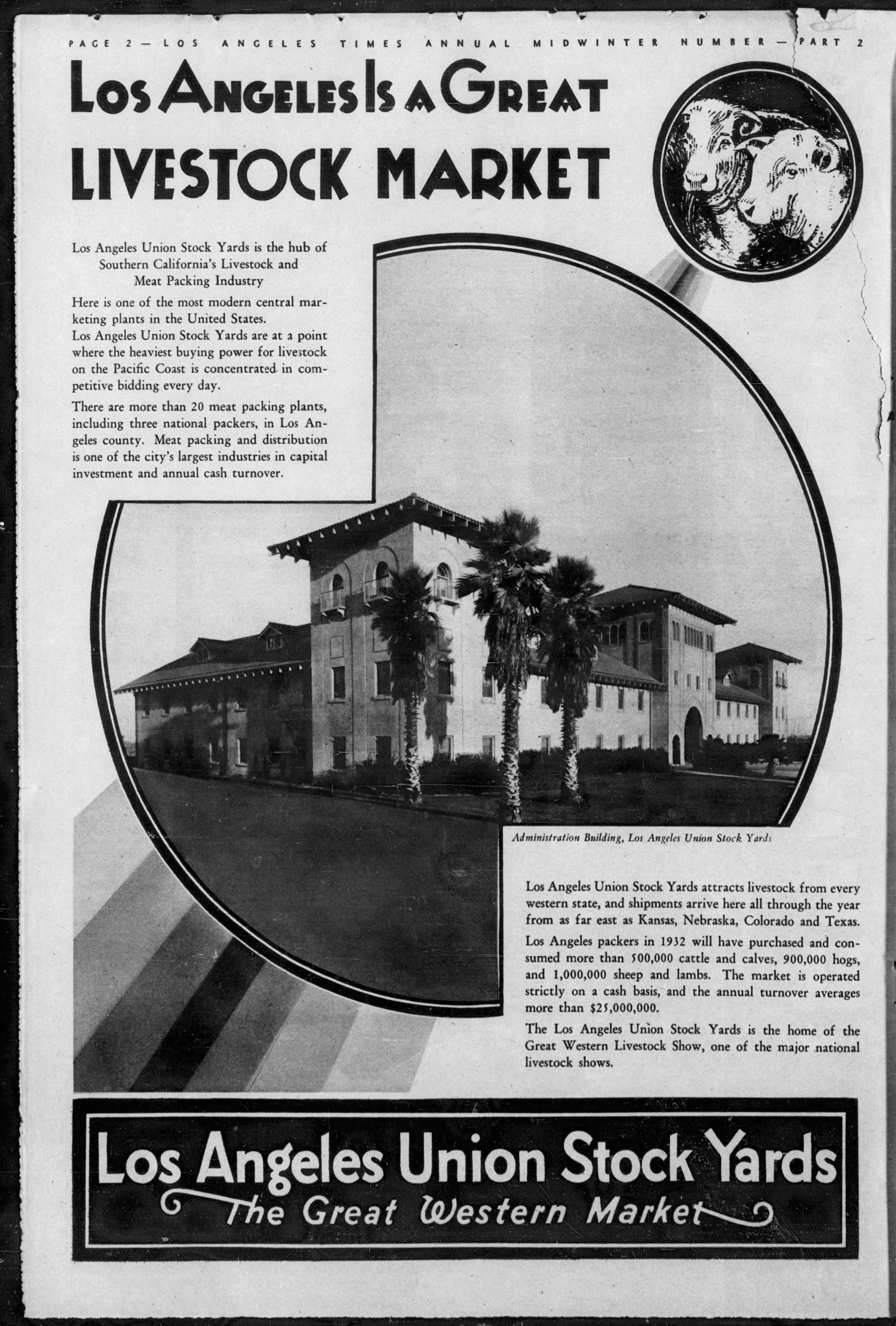
- 1933 Los Angeles Times ad depicting the Spanish Colonial Revival-style administration building
- Industry: Livestock market, meat processing
- Founded: November 1, 1922; 102 years ago
- Defunct: April 30, 1960
- Fate: Demolished
- Headquarters: Vernon, California, United States

The Los Angeles Union Stock Yards were a livestock market and transfer station in the so-called Central Merchandising District south of downtown Los Angeles in Los Angeles County, California. The stock yards closed in 1960 and the facilities were demolished and replaced with other industrial warehouses.

== History ==
The Central Manufacturing District was established on what had once been the pre-statehood Rancho San Antonio land grant. The Stock Yards were built on the site of the 1847 Battle of La Mesa. Planning for the development and some outdoor pens were established as early as 1913. The Los Angeles Union Stock Yards were developed by the businessmen who ran the Union Stock Yards of Chicago. The Central Manufacturing District Terminal building, sometimes called the Tower Building, was developed at the same time as the stock yards. The grand opening of the Spanish-style administration building was held on November 1, 1922.

Beginning in September 1925, the Stock Yards and the Central Manufacturing District generally were served by the Los Angeles Junction Railway which permitted joint use of the tracks by Southern Pacific, Union Pacific and Santa Fe trains. In 1926 the Stock Yards Company controlled 300 acres of land in the area but the Stock Yards proper encompassed 25 acres. The Great Western Livestock Show was held at the Los Angeles Union Stockyards from 1926 until 1953. Santa Fe Railroad bought out the Stock Yards Company in 1928 and eventually expanded the "Central Manufacturing District" into a 3,500 acre irregularly shaped industrial tract. Circa 1939 the Los Angeles Union Stock Yards advertised itself to ranchers as being host to four major national meat packing companies and 25 smaller regional companies. The Stockyards Hotel brothel was operated in proximity to the stockyards by Augusto "Chito" Sasso and Rose "Mumsie" McGonigle circa 1940. The Junction Railway Company took over the stock yard platforms, chutes, chute pens, facilities for feeding, resting and watering livestock in 1941.

Beginning during World War II, stockmen began selling their animals directly to packers, and the industry shifted more generally to using trucks, rather than rail, for transport. The stockyard business declined but the value of centrally located Los Angeles real estate continued to increase. The Los Angeles Union Stock Yards were closed on April 30, 1960. The Stock Yard buildings were all demolished and eventually replaced with other commercial and industrial warehouses.

== See also ==
- List of union stockyards in the United States
