= German Nebraskans =

German Nebraskans are residents of the US state of Nebraska are of German ancestry. At the 2000 U.S. Census, there were 738,894 German Americans living in Nebraska, making up 42.7% of the population, the third largest percentage of any state.

== See also ==
- Germans in Omaha, Nebraska
