= List of union stockyards in the United States =

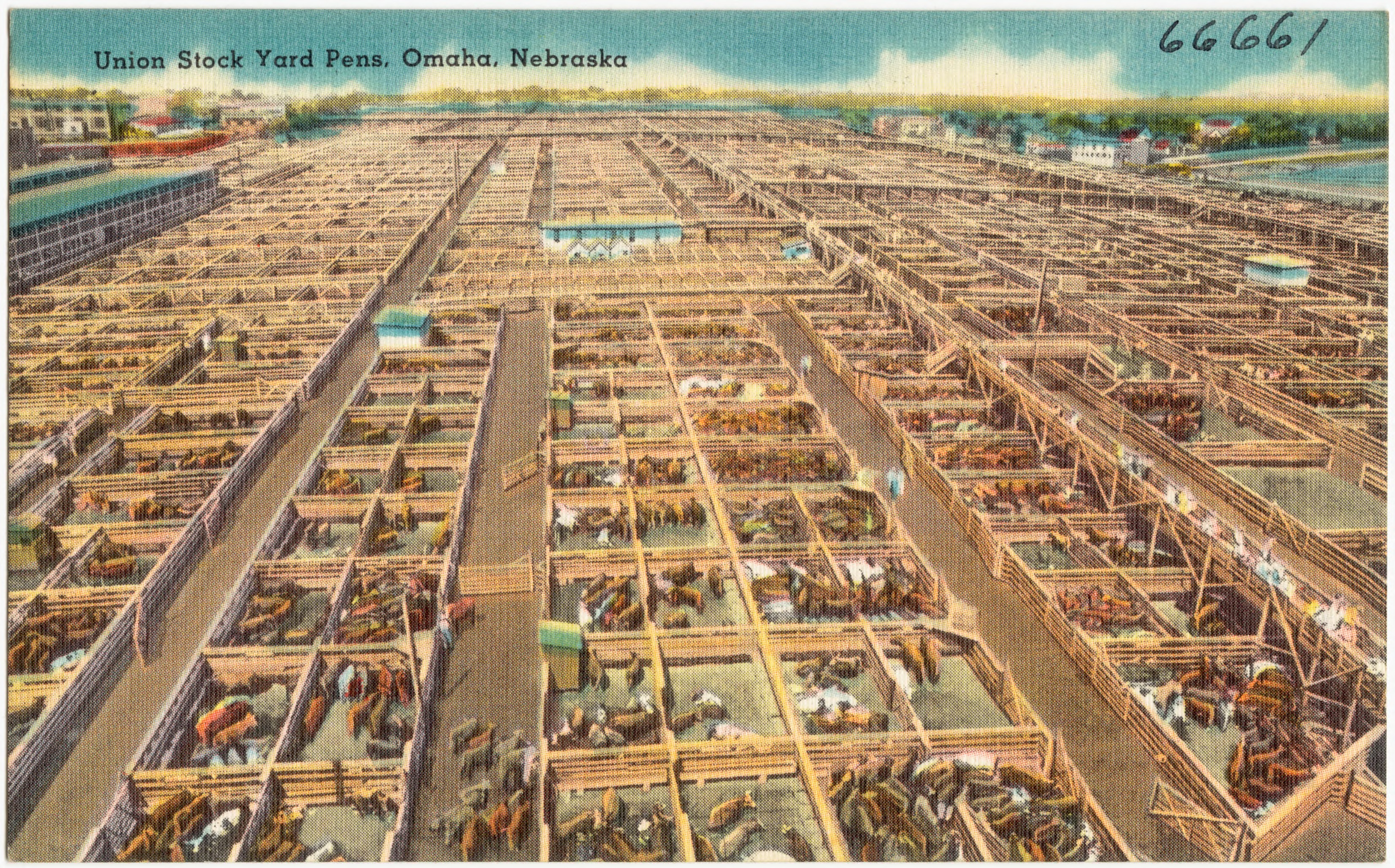
Union Stock Yard Pens, Omaha, Nebraska (postcard image from 1930s or 1940s)

Union stockyards in the United States were centralized urban livestock yards where multiple rail lines delivered animals from ranches and farms for slaughter and meat packing. A stockyard company managed the work of unloading the livestock, which was faster and more efficient than using railway staff. Terminal stockyards received, handled, fed, watered, weighed, held, and forward-shipped commercial livestock. The Chicago Union Stock Yards were the most famous and enduring example of this type of commercial complex. They are considered one of the chief drivers that empowered the animal–industrial complex into its modern form. Stock yards also existed in Canada. Livestock from ranches in Mexico and points south were sometimes driven to American stockyards.

Circa 1923 there were approximately 70 major stockyards in the United States. Stockyards mostly handled cattle and pigs for beef and pork production, but occasionally served as waystations for other animals. For example, around 1934 a dozen American bison from Colorado headed for Santa Catalina Island were held at the Los Angeles Union Stock Yards before boarding the ferry for their final leg of the trip.

== List of major commercial stockyards in the United States ==
- Atlanta Union Stock Yards
- Brighton Stock Yards, Boston
- Cincinnati Union Stock Yards
- Chicago Union Stock Yards
- Denver Stock Yards
- Detroit Stock Yards
- El Paso Union Stock Yards
- Fort Worth Stockyards
- Jersey City Stock Yards
- Kansas City Stockyards
- Los Angeles Union Stock Yards
- Memphis Union Stock Yards
- Nashville Union Stock Yards
- New Orleans Stock Yards
- Omaha Union Stock Yards
- Peoria Union Stockyards
- Portland Union Stock Yards
- St. Louis National Stock Yards
- Pittsburgh Union Stock Yards
- Spokane Union Stock Yards
- Wichita Union Stock Yards
- Stockyard City OKC

== See also ==
- Animal–industrial complex
- Packers and Stockyards Act
