= Luther Kountze =

American banker

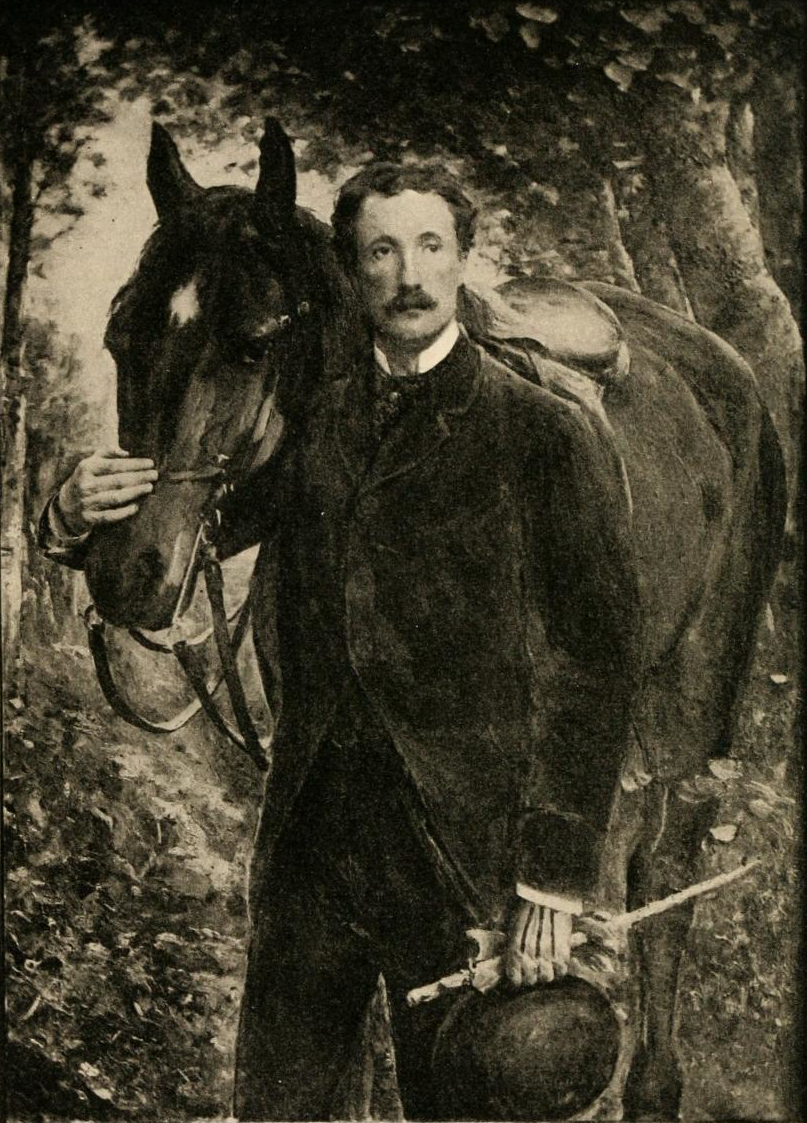
- Born: October 29, 1841; Osnaburg, Ohio
- Died: April 17, 1918
- Occupation: Banker

Luther Kountze (October 29, 1841 – April 17, 1918) was an American banker, responsible for helping the city of Denver, Colorado in a time of need and leaving a philanthropic legacy in Morristown, New Jersey. He founded a late-19th century national banking dynasty along with his brothers Charles, Herman and Augustus.

From 1858 to 1862, Luther worked at the Kountze Brothers Bank in Omaha, Nebraska, which was operated by his brothers Augustus and Herman. Late in 1862, he went to Denver, Colorado, where he opened a bank under the name of Kountze Brothers and listed his brothers as senior members. In 1866, they organized the Colorado National Bank of Denver.

After a great fire engulfed much of the city in 1863, Kountze was credited with saving the city of Denver, Colorado from financial disaster, and ultimately, oblivion. Late that year and into the next, Kountze worked with several other investors to form the company that would eventually become the Denver Pacific Railroad and Telegraph Co.

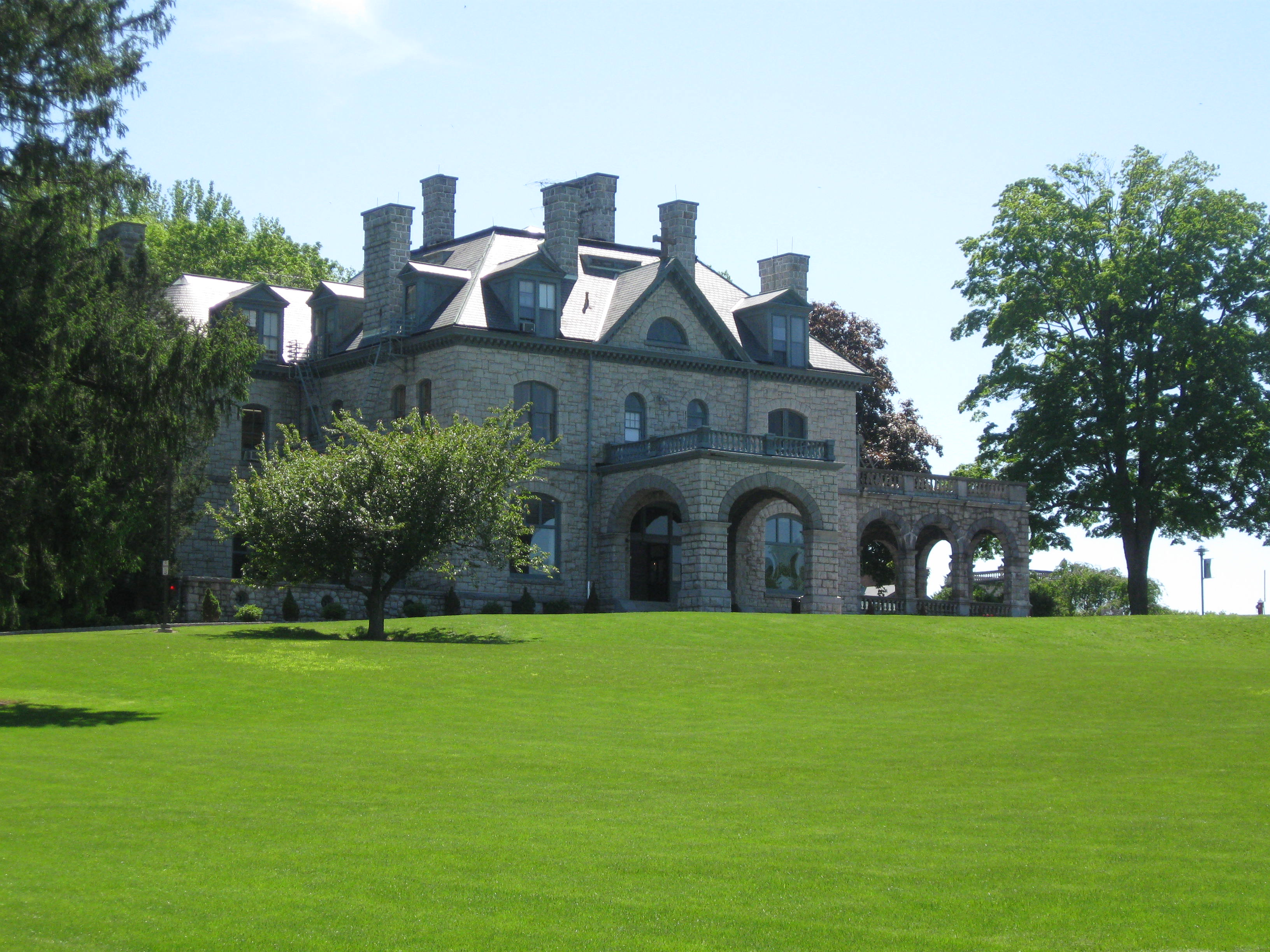
Kountze's Mansion, now located on Delbarton School's campus

Luther left Colorado for New York in 1867. In 1868, he established the Kountze Brothers Bank at 52 Wall Street in Manhattan. His brother Augustus later joined him there, where they traded securities and bonds. In 1908, U.S. Senator Robert M. La Follette included him in the "100 men who controlled banking." He was then vice-president and a director of the United States Mortgage and Trust Company.

In 1881, Luther moved to Morristown, New Jersey and built an English-style estate designed by George E. Harney. He died in 1918, leaving an estate valued at $4,973,950.

Kountze was one of the founders of the Metropolitan Opera House Company. He contributed a large part of the land that now forms the National Jockey Hollow Park in Morristown, NJ.
