= Valentin J. Peter =

German-American publisher

Valentin Josef Peter
- Born: April 24, 1875; Steinbach am Wald, Bavaria
- Died: February 19, 1960; Omaha, Nebraska, US
- Occupation: Publisher
- Spouse: Margaret Rees
- Children: 12

Valentin J. Peter (1875–1960) was a German-American publisher of a German language newspaper called the Omaha Tribüne in Omaha, Nebraska. He had immigrated to the United States from Bavaria in 1889. Active in the ethnic German community in the city, he became founding president of the Nebraska chapter of the National German-American Alliance.

== About ==
Born in Bavaria, Peter immigrated to the United States in 1889, settling first in Illinois. As a young man, he wanted to be a teacher but worked at a sawmill before apprenticing with Friedrich von Parrot, publisher of a weekly German newspaper called the Volkszeitung. Within several years Peter became involved with German language newspapers in Peoria and Rock Island, Illinois. In 1904 when the Volkszeitung went bankrupt, Peter purchased the paper for $1,500 and at twenty-two years old, he became the youngest editor in all of Illinois.

In 1907 Peter moved to Omaha, Nebraska, and bought the Westliche Presse. The following year purchased and revived a newspaper called the Omaha Tribüne. Peter consolidated the two papers to create the Omaha Tribüne-Westliche Presse, which he published in German. On March 14, 1912, Peter introduced the Tägliche Omaha Tribüne, (Daily Omaha Tribune). It was published under than name until 1926, when it was changed to Omaha Tribüne and split to offer a separate Sunday paper. During World War I, Peter continued to merge German-language newspapers from across the region into his enterprise. The German-language paper would serve the German populations of Nebraska, Iowa, and other Midwest states until 1960.

Peter was a devout Roman Catholic. He also belonged to the Elks, and to a number of social and charitable German immigrant organizations in Omaha. In November 1910 Peter founded and became the president of the Nebraska chapter of the National German-American Alliance. Using his position as publisher and editor of the Omaha Tribüne, Peter followed the NGAA's policy against Prohibition and rallied against Nebraskan politicians and policies he saw as working against the distribution of alcohol.

An active businessman, Peter continued buying and consolidating other German-language newspapers throughout the Midwest for several years. His dominance of the German-language newspaper industry in the United States was established by the 1930s. After spending 50 years operating the only German-language newspapers in the U.S., Peter's company sold its final publications in 1982.

In 1950 Peter was awarded the Knight of St. Gregory by Pope Pius XII.

Val J. Peter died in Omaha on February 19, 1960, after a brief illness. He is buried in Saint Mary Magdalene Cemetery there.

== Politics ==
Peter and his newspapers were initially against American involvement in World War I. At a NGAA meeting, he was quoted as saying,

Both here and abroad, the enemy is the same! Perfidious Albion! Over there England has pressed the sword into the hands of almost all the peoples of Europe against Germany. In this country it has a servile press at its command, which uses every foul means to slander everything German and to poison the public mind. - Valentin Peter (1915)

He changed his position before the US entered the war in 1917 on the side of Great Britain and France, and supported the Allies.

Following the Japanese attack on Pearl Harbor in December 1941, Peter published a statement in his newspapers strongly supporting the US and its allies. He wrote, "time for political disagreement about international affairs has passed" and that "all American citizens of German blood" needed to "stand behind their government."

== Legacy ==
Peter married and had a family. Two of his sons have carried on some of his commitments to the Catholic Church, civil organizations, and the printing business.

The family of one of his sons, Eugene Peter (b. 1925), still operates the Interstate Printing Company in Omaha, which printed the Omaha Tribüne for decades. The company has been located in the Near North Side neighborhood of North Omaha since the 1950s.

Another son, Valentin J. Peter, Jr., became a Roman Catholic priest with the Society of Jesus (SJ). He served as the executive director of Boystown (Father Flanagan's Home for Boys) near Omaha for several years.

== See also ==
- Germans in Omaha
- History of Omaha
