= Augustus Kountze =

American businessman

1st Treasurer of Nebraska
- In office 1867–1869
- Governor: David Butler
- Preceded by: (Office created)
- Succeeded by: James Sweet

3rd Treasurer of Nebraska Territory
- In office 1861–1867
- Governor: Alvin Saunders
- Preceded by: William W. Wyman
- Succeeded by: (Office abolished)

Personal details
- Born: 19 November 1826 Osnaburg, Ohio
- Died: 30 April 1892 (aged 65)
- Resting place: Woodlawn Cemetery, Bronx
- Party: Republican
- Occupation: Businessman

Augustus Kountze (November 19, 1826–April 30, 1892) was an American businessman based in Omaha, Nebraska, Kountze, Texas and New York City. He founded a late 19th-century national banking dynasty along with his brothers Charles Kountze, Herman Kountze and Luther Kountze.

In 1861, Augustus was named Treasurer of the Nebraska Territory, and in 1867 was named the first Treasurer of the State of Nebraska. In 1862, US President Abraham Lincoln appointed him to the original Board of Directors of the Union Pacific Railroad.

== Biography ==
Born in 1826 in rural Ohio, Kountze was one of the seven children of Christian and Margaret Kountze (originally Kuntze). Christian had immigrated to the U.S. from Saxony, a German province. After marrying Margaret Zerbe of Pennsylvania, the couple relocated in Osnaburg, in Stark County, Ohio. There he opened a grocery store and trained his sons in business. Augustus left his parents' home in 1854, moving to Muscatine, Iowa, and then westward to Omaha in 1855, where he began trading in real estate.

In Omaha Kountze developed a massive banking, real estate and railroad portfolio. His diverse holdings included the Omaha Horse Railway Company; he was the Treasurer of the Nebraska Territory and the state of Nebraska from 1861 through 1869. In 1858, he wrote to his Lutheran pastor in Canton, Ohio, and requested that Nebraska be named a mission field of the church. Because of that action the first Lutheran worship service in Nebraska was held on December 5, 1858.

=== Banking and real estate ===
Kountze lived in Omaha until 1872. In the intervening years, he and his brother Herman accumulated a great number of land holdings along the Missouri River, including Brownville, Nebraska City, Tekamah and Dakota City, Nebraska, and Sioux City, Iowa. Eventually Kountze held a great deal of real estate across the Midwest and Western United States. He had large holdings in Iowa and Minnesota, and later invested heavily in central and western Nebraska. Eventually the two brothers held land in Chicago, Denver, and across East Texas. Kountze was responsible for the 1868 sale of land in North Omaha which became Fort Omaha.

In 1856, Augustus and Herman established Kountze Brothers Bank, later changing the name to First National Bank of Omaha. Fellow Omaha pioneer Edward Creighton became president of the bank, remaining in that position until his death in 1874. Kountze was responsible for the construction of the First National Bank Building in Omaha. In 1866, Augustus's brother Charles founded the Colorado National Bank, which named Augustus as a senior member; likewise in 1868 brother Luther opened the Kountze Brothers Bank in New York City, and also named Augustus a senior member.

=== Railroads ===
Augustus Kountze was deeply invested in railroads across the western United States. He was president of the Boston, Hoosac Tunnel and Western Railroad, and when it was consolidated with the Fitchburg Railroad he became a director in that company, position he held until death. Herman and Augustus were the principal backers of the Omaha and Northwestern Railroad, and also held an interest in the Denver, South Park and Pacific Railroad and the Sabine and East Texas Railway. The town of Kountze, Texas, was named in honor of the Kountze brothers' investment in that railroad. Kountze was a Government Director for the Union Pacific, and is recorded as being influential in the placement of the Union Pacific Headquarters in Omaha, along with the Union Pacific Harriman Dispatch Center and the Union Pacific Shops.

Periodically Augustus' diverse interests would supplement one another. For instance, in 1880 he announced his desire to complete the Sabine and East Texas Railroad from Beaumont, Texas, through Sabine Pass, Texas, to Rockland, Texas. This enabled Kountze to market the 250,000 acres (1,000 km^{2}) of virgin timber on land which he owned in nearby counties.

In 1872, Kountze moved to New York City permanently to assist with the expanding operations of the brothers' banking operations there. He was a director of the New York Security and Trust Company as well. A wedding of a niece at his home in New York City was regarded as a major social event in 1892.

=== Philanthropy ===
In 1885, Kountze funded the construction of the Kountze Memorial Lutheran Church in Omaha, which was named in honor of Christian Kountze, his father. Today the church is located at 26th & Farnam Streets in Downtown Omaha. He also funded a church in Ohio in honor of his parents, as well as much of St. James Lutheran Church in New York City.

== Death ==
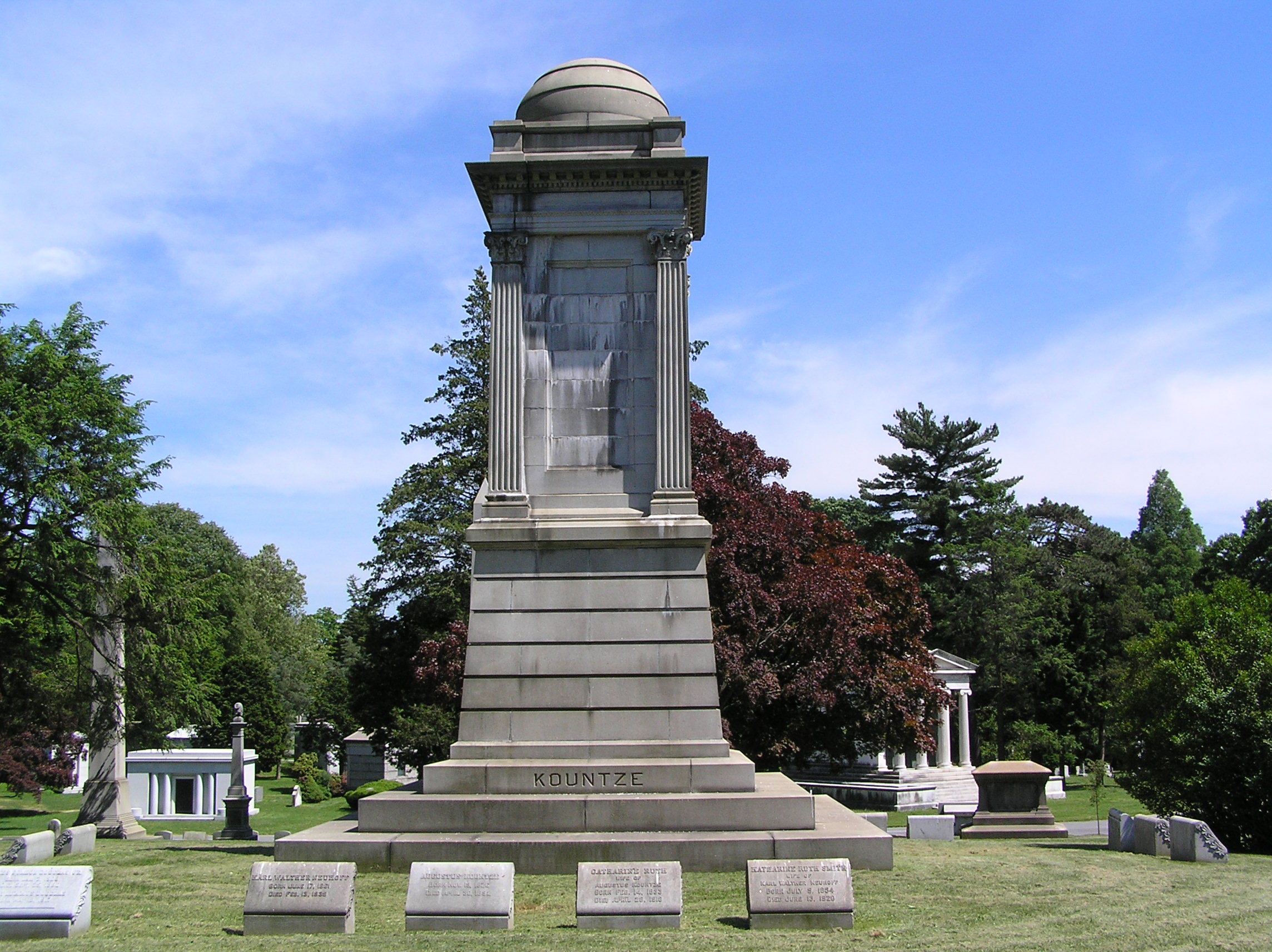
The monument of Augustus Kountze in Woodlawn Cemetery

After Kountze died in 1892 he was buried in the Woodlawn Cemetery in the Bronx.

== See also ==
- History of Omaha
- Founding figures of Omaha, Nebraska
