= Livestock Exchange Building (Omaha, Nebraska) =

Building in Omaha, Nebraska, U.S.

- U.S. National Register of Historic Places
- Omaha Landmark
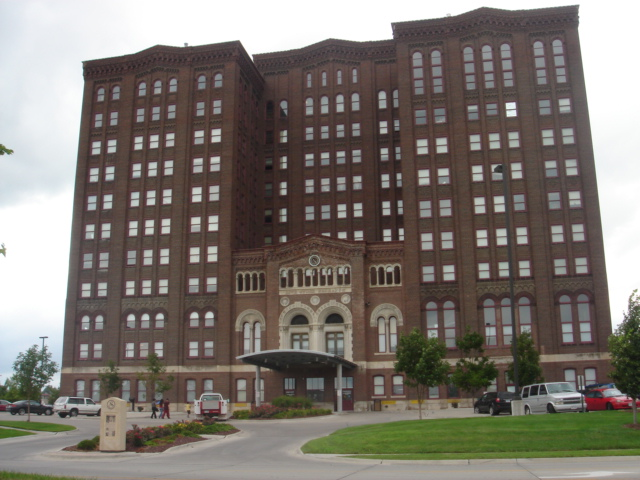
- The Livestock Exchange Building in 2007

- Location within Nebraska
- Location: Omaha, Nebraska, United States
- Coordinates: 41°12′36″N 95°57′22″W
- Built: 1926
- Architect: Prinz, George; Peter Kiewit and Sons
- Architectural style: Romanesque Revival; Northern Italian Renaissance Revival
- NRHP reference No.: 99000751

Significant dates
- Added to NRHP: July 7, 1999
- Designated OMAL: June 22, 1999

The Livestock Exchange Building in Omaha, Nebraska, United States, was built in 1926 at 4920 South 30 Street in South Omaha. It was designed as the centerpiece of the Union Stockyards by architect George Prinz and built by Peter Kiewit and Sons in the Romanesque Revival and Northern Italian Renaissance Revival styles. In 1999 it was designated an Omaha Landmark and listed on the National Register of Historic Places. The Union Stockyards were closed in 1999, and the Livestock Exchange Building underwent an extensive renovation over the next several years.

== History ==
According to the City of Omaha Landmarks Heritage Preservation Commission, the Livestock Exchange Building was the largest and most visually prominent building constructed in South Omaha. Completed for the Union Stock Yards Company of Omaha in May 1926, the Livestock Exchange Building was the most significant structure associated with the Omaha Stockyards and served as the center of the livestock industry in Omaha. Chicago and Omaha were the two largest centers for livestock processing in the nation, and the industry was the most important in the city. In 1957 the stockyards and meatpacking industry employed half the workforce of Omaha.

Once the center of business and trading in the midst of 260 acres (110 ha) of livestock pens, the Livestock Exchange Building housed the Stockyards National Bank, offices, a bakery, cafeteria, kitchen, soda fountain, cigar stand, telephone and telegraph offices, apartments and sleeping rooms, a clothing store and a convention hall. There are two ballrooms located on the 10th floor, with 22-foot ceilings in an elegant Romanesque and Northern Italian Renaissance Revival style. The North Ballroom has a built-in bar, stage and hardwood floors. The South Ballroom has a balcony, three private boardrooms and a large dance surface.

A complex public-private renovation was completed in 2005. The building was converted to mixed-use, yielding more than 100 apartments, plus community and commercial space. Its historical character was preserved and it will be the center of a new neighborhood. The surrounding area will be redeveloped for mixed commercial, medical and light industrial uses. One of the most recent additions is the newest iteration of the South Omaha Library, a partnership between the City of Omaha and the Metropolitan Community College. The college has also opened a new campus on the site of the former stockyards.

== See also ==
- History of Omaha
- Union Stockyards (Omaha)
- Union Stock Yards Company of Omaha
