= Krug Park (amusement park) =

Former amusement park in Omaha, Nebraska, United States

Coordinates: 41°17′13″N 95°59′47″W

- Postcard
- Interactive map of Krug Park
- Location: Omaha, Nebraska, U.S.
- Opened: 1895
- Closed: 1940
- Owner: Frederick Krug
- Slogan: "Omaha's Polite Resort"

Krug Park (currently known as Gallagher Park) was an amusement park located at 2936 North 52nd Street in the Benson neighborhood of Omaha, Nebraska, United States at the turn of the 20th century. In 1930, Krug Park was the site of the deadliest roller coaster accident in the nation's history.

== History ==
Charles Tietz, an early Omaha German-American pioneer, founded the park in 1895. In 1902 the Frederick Krug Brewing Company bought it and ran it as Krug Park, a beer garden with amusement rides. Rides included a tunnel of love, an ice cream parlor, and a hot air balloon. Dancers performed nightly in a dance pavilion. Swimming pools, a waterfall, a wave machine, and a two-story bathhouse were added in 1918. Fred Krug referred to it as "a complete amusement park." Early advertisements referred to Krug Park as "Omaha's Polite Resort."

=== Roller coaster incident ===
The most deadly roller coaster accident in the United States up to 1930 happened at Krug Park. On July 24, the park's "Big Dipper" roller coaster crashed. After 6 p.m., a bolt worked loose and four cars full of children and teenagers plunged to the ground. Four people, Ruth Claire Farrell (15), Herschel Stout (34), Tony Politika (22) and Gladys Lundgren (29), were killed and 17 were injured. The Omaha City Council immediately passed an ordinance banning roller coasters in Omaha. Krug Park stayed open but business declined afterwards, and it closed in 1940.

== Gallagher Park ==
Gallagher Park
- Interactive map of Gallagher Park
- Type: Urban park
- Location: Benson in Omaha, Nebraska
- Area: 18.8 acres (76,000 m^{2})
- Created: 1941
- Operator: City of Omaha Parks and Recreation Department
- Status: Open all year

It was landscaped into a traditional style park in 1955. It has been renamed Gallagher Park, and is a public park. The current park is 18.8 acres (76,000 m^{2}) and contains three ball fields, a playground, and a city swimming pool featuring a water slide, diving boards, and additional water play features.

== See also ==
- History of Omaha
