= Metz Brewery =

Brewery in Omaha, Nebraska, U.S.

Metz Brothers Brewing Company
- Company type: Private
- Industry: Beverages
- Founded: 1856
- Defunct: 1936
- Headquarters: Omaha, Nebraska, United States
- Key people: Frederick Metz
- Products: Beers, lagers, malt beverages

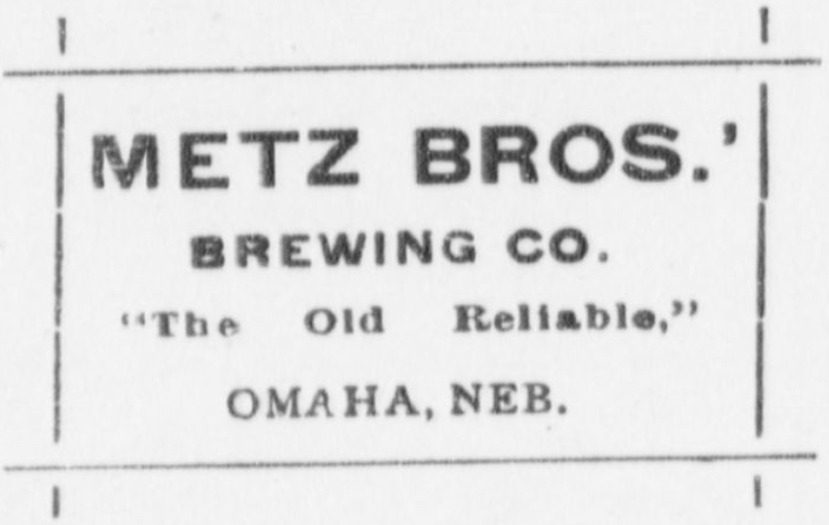
Brewery advertisement in 1900, Metz Brothers Brewing Company, Omaha, Nebraska.

The Metz Brothers Brewing Company was among the first brewers in the U.S. state of Nebraska, having been established in the city of Omaha in 1859. It was among the earliest manufacturers in the city. After originally opening as the McCumbe Brewery, the facility was sold several times until brothers Frederick and Philip Metz purchased it in 1861. Metz was one of the "Big 4" brewers located in Omaha, which also included the Krug, Willow Springs and Storz breweries.

== History ==
In 1880 the Metz Brewery was located at 1717 South 3rd Street, and was producing 12,400 barrels (390,600 gallons) per year. Later the facility moved to 209 Hickory Street into the former Willow Springs Distilling Company facility. Considered to be modern for the time, the facilities sat on an entire city block. Early brewing equipment included three cooling vaults, two of which were 20 feet wide by 75 feet long; and one smaller vault, being 20 feet wide by 30 feet long. The ice rooms immediately above were of the same dimensions. The mash tun and brewing kettle each had a capacity for holding one hundred 31.5-gallon barrels. Barns for the delivery horses were also located on site. The brewery was said to have "no equal in the country."

The Metz brothers also ran the Metz Brothers Beer Hall, located on 510 South Tenth Street. Beer was supplied in barrels transported by horse-drawn cart from the main brewery.

The Metz Brewery closed because of the Prohibition. The facility was sold to an agriculture company in 1920. The label was brewed until 1961 by the Walter Brewing Company of Pueblo, Colorado.

== See also ==
- History of Omaha
- Economics of Omaha
- List of defunct consumer brands
