= Krug Brewery =

Brewery in Omaha, Nebraska

Fred Krug Brewery
- Type: Private
- Industry: Beverages
- Founded: 1848
- Defunct: 1936
- Headquarters: Omaha, Nebraska, United States
- Key people: Frederick Krug
- Products: Beers, lagers, malt beverages
- Website: https://krugbrewery.com

The Fred Krug Brewery was a brewery in Omaha, Nebraska. Founded by Frederick Krug in 1859, it was the city's first, and one of its "Big 4", which also included the Storz, Willow Springs and Metz breweries. Located at 2435 Deer Park Boulevard, Krug was sold to the Falstaff Brewing Company in 1936, which closed the facility in 1987.

The Krug Brewery in Omaha should not be confused with an earlier Krug Brewery in Milwaukee, Wisconsin, the forerunner of the Joseph Schlitz Brewing Company. It was founded in 1856 when Joseph Schlitz assumed management upon marrying Anna Maria Krug, the widow of George August Krug.

== History ==
In 1859, Frederick Krug established the Krug Brewery with an original output of one and a half barrels a day. In 1878, the brewery was located on Farnam between 10th & 11th Streets in Downtown Omaha, and by 1880 it was brewing approximately 25,000 barrels a year. In 1894, the brewery moved to 29th & Vinton Street near South Omaha. It cost $750,000 and was reportedly one of the best equipped breweries in the country. Omaha's historic Anheuser-Busch Beer Depot is the only remaining building from the original Krug Brewery.

You wouldn't believe there was such difference in beers until you use one Krug's popular brands. They are uniform perfectly brewed and well-aged absolutely pure and leave no bad after effects. The kind of beer that acts as a tonic and a system builder. Order a trial case and begin to enjoy.
— Text from a 1910 advertisement by Fred Krug Brewing Company

Krug brewed beer under several labels: Fred Krug, Cabinet, and Luxus. Krug supported an amateur baseball team called Luxus, taking them as far as the Amateur Baseball World Championship in 1915.

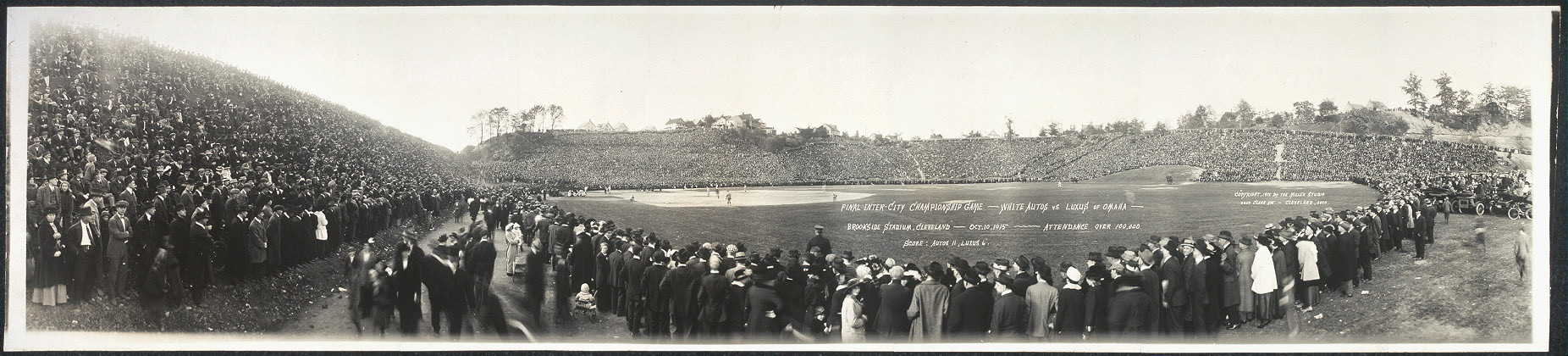
Omaha Luxus vs. Cleveland White Autos - Cleveland, 1915

Krug Brewery bought a park in the Benson neighborhood of Omaha in 1904, built a beer garden, added amusement rides, and renamed it "Krug Park". The park was successful until 1930, when a roller coaster accident killed four people; soon after the park folded.

The brewery stopped operating during Prohibition (1920–1933), and resumed operations in fall 1933 following its repeal. Three years later, the company was sold to Falstaff Brewing of St. Louis, Missouri, making Falstaff the first major brewer to operate separate plants in different states. The plant ceased operations in 1987, and several buildings were demolished in 1996.

== See also ==
- History of Omaha
- List of defunct consumer brands
- List of defunct breweries in the United States
