= Frederick Metz =

American politician (1832–1901)

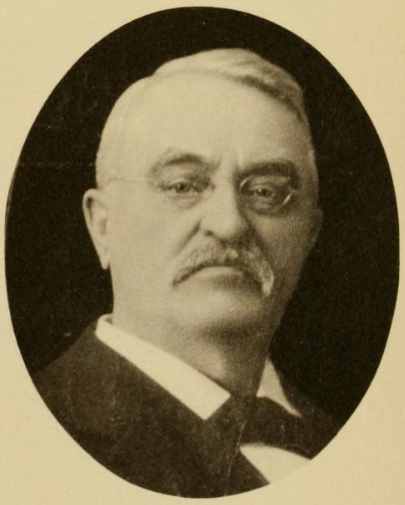
Photograph of Metz

Frederick Metz (1832–1901) founded and owned the Metz Brewery in Omaha, Nebraska, for forty years. He was also a two-time representative in the Nebraska Legislature, and an influential member of Omaha society.

== Biography ==
Born in the Electorate of Hesse, Frederick was educated as a forester. In 1851 he emigrated to the United States of America through the port of New Orleans, Louisiana, and settled in St. Louis, Missouri, where he worked in the mercantile business. In 1857 he came to Bellevue, Nebraska and continued in the merchandising trade until 1862. Frederick next went to Denver, Colorado and established a wholesale and commission business in general merchandise, which he owned until 1864. In 1864 Frederick returned to Nebraska and with his brother Philip purchased the McCumbe Brewery, the first brewery in Nebraska, which they renamed Metz Brewery. Frederick served in the Nebraska Senate in 1871 and again 1885. He was president of German Savings Bank in Omaha.

== Family ==
He married Louisa Beate Gesser of St. Louis in 1855. Frederick and Louisa had four sons and three daughters together. In 1873 Louisa died and was buried in Prospect Hill Cemetery. In 1877 Frederick married Adele Wassmer, who was born in Holstein, Germany, and had emigrated to Nebraska. Together they had one son and one daughter. Metz died at the brewery at the age of 69, and was also interred at the Prospect Hill Cemetery in North Omaha.

== See also ==
- Founding figures of Omaha, Nebraska
- History of Omaha
