= Union Stockyards (Omaha) =

Livestock and meat-processing complex

Coordinates: 41.210°N 95.958°W

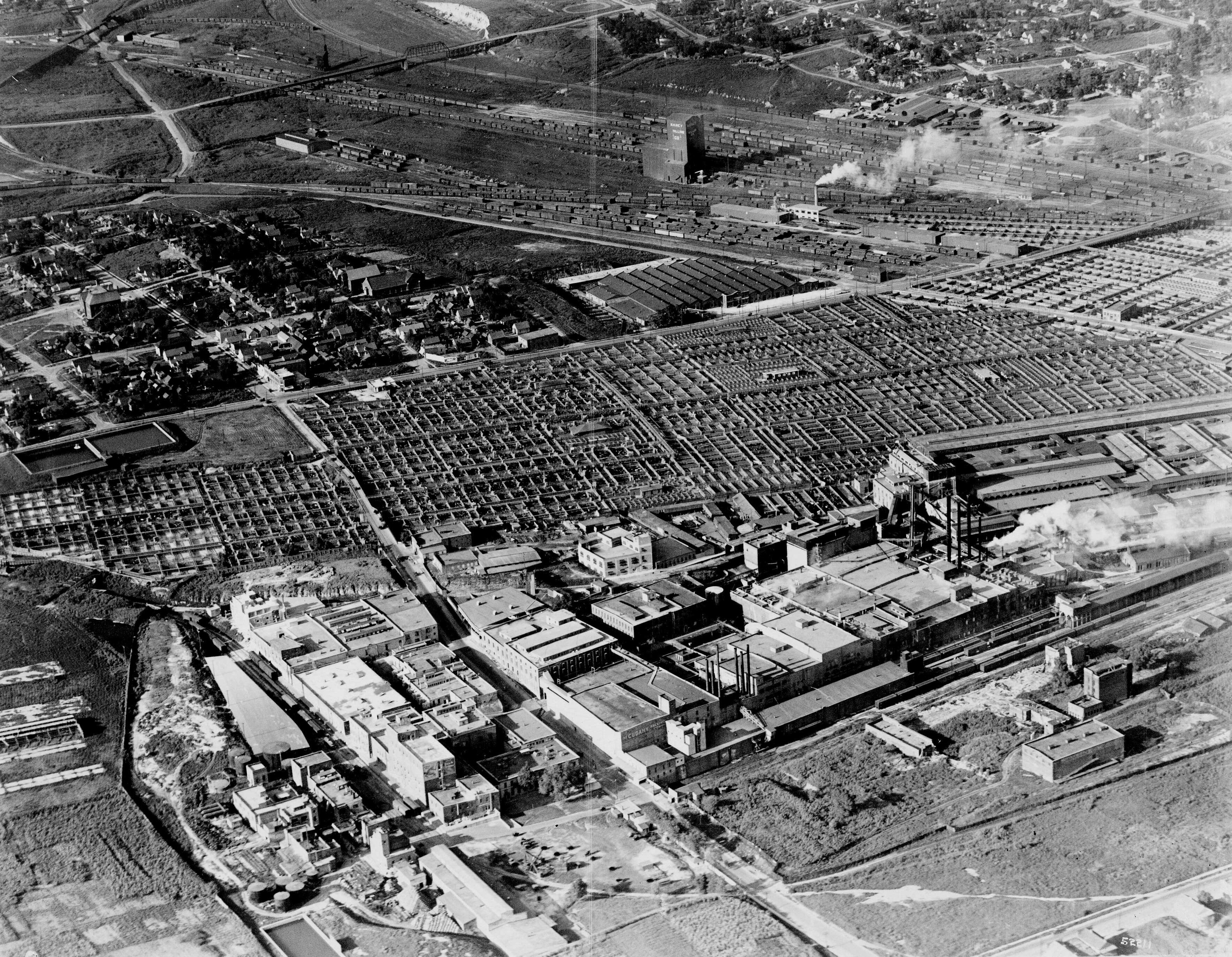
Aerial view, 1923

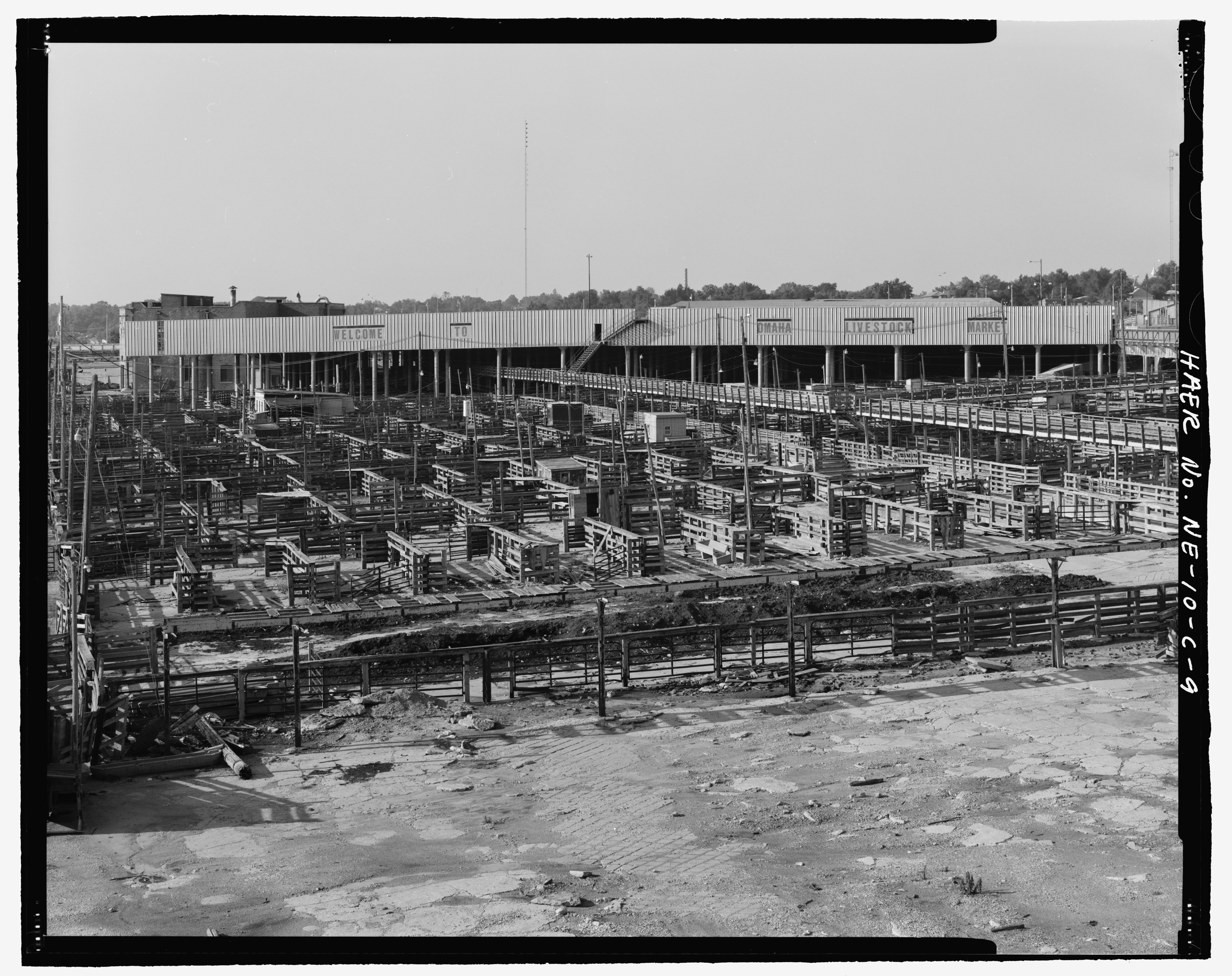
"Welcome to the Omaha livestock market"

The Union Stockyards of Omaha, Nebraska, were founded in 1883 in South Omaha by the Union Stock Yards Company of Omaha. A fierce rival of Chicago's Union Stock Yards, the Omaha Union Stockyards were third in the United States for production by 1890. In 1947 they were second to Chicago in the world. Omaha overtook Chicago as the nation's largest livestock market and meat packing industry center in 1955, a title which it held onto until 1971. The 116-year-old institution closed in 1999. The Livestock Exchange Building was listed on the National Register of Historic Places in 1999.

== History ==
Site plan, 1887

The first meat packer in Omaha preceded the founding of the Stockyards. James E. Boyd, an Irish-born politician important to early Omaha and Nebraska, got his start in the state after opening Boyd's Packing House in the downtown area. A cattle baron named Alexander Swan called for the founder of Omaha's first stockyards, William A. Paxton, to start a new facility in the early 1880s. Working along with Herman Kountze, John A. Creighton and others, the new stockyards received the first shipment of 531 longhorn cattle from Medicine Bow, Wyoming in 1884. Initially, the Union Stockyards operated as a feeding station for stock on their way to eastern markets like the Union Stock Yards in Chicago. The first livestock exchange was located in a farmhouse on the site. The Union Stock Yards originally covered over 260 acres (1.1 km^{2}) of land, with pens covering nearly 200 acres (0.8 km^{2}). They were located between South 36th Street on the west to South 27th Street on the east; L Street on the north to Q Street on the south.

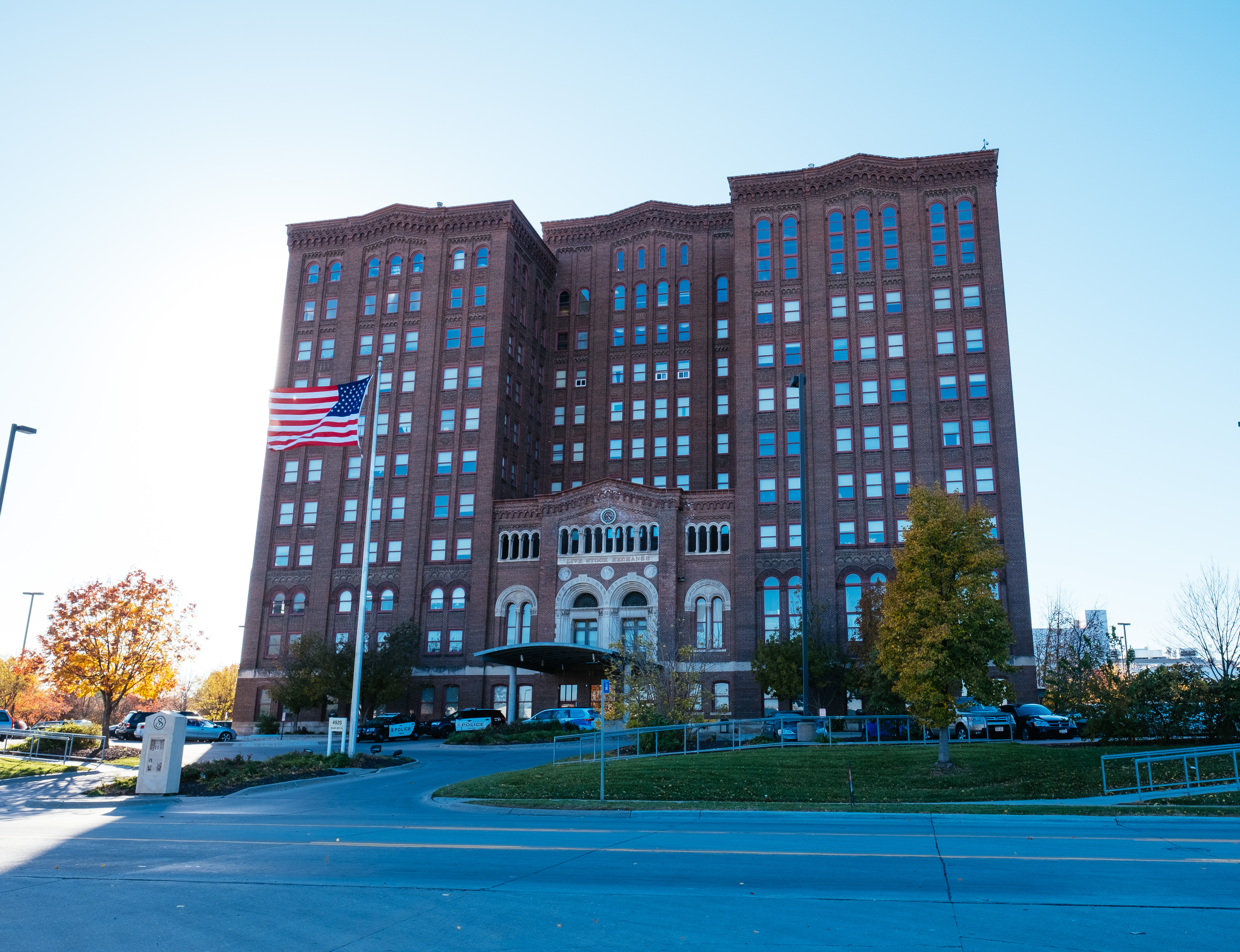
Livestock Exchange Building

The second exchange building was constructed in 1885 by J. E. Riley and designed by Mendelssohn and Fisher. It was a substantial structure, complete with amenities and apartments for traders, as well as elaborate convention rooms, in recognition both of the growing importance and Omaha's ambitions for the industry. The "Big Four" meat packers established during this period were Armour, Wilson, Cudahy, and Swift.

=== 1900 to 1940s ===
Site plan, 1925

Around 1900, the Stockyards added new pens with brick floors and concrete watering troughs, along with new scales. The sheep barn was rebuilt to hold 100,000 animals, and the new two-block horse and mule barn was hailed as "the largest and best single barn in the world." It housed the largest ranch horse market in the world. In 1910, 20,000 animals arrived at the Stockyards each day from farms and ranches in 20 states, including Nebraska, Colorado, Wyoming, Idaho, Montana, Utah and South Dakota. Ten slaughterhouses and meatpacking plants were in operation.

Between 1907 and 1910, most of the original pens were rebuilt with walkways, allowing buyers to view stock without walking through the pens. In the early 20th century, Union Stockyards was the world's largest sheep market. The stock yards were dependent on Omaha's Union Pacific Railroad to bring livestock to market. On average, 20,000 animals per day arrived at the Union Stockyards for slaughter. Cattle, hogs, sheep, buffalo, deer, horses, mules and chickens were sold on the market in early years. By 1888, the "Big Four" packing companies, which included Hammond’s, Fowler Brothers, Swift & Company, and Armour-Cudahy, were operating in Omaha. Among the four companies, South Omaha companies processed more than 1 million cattle, hogs and sheep each year. By 1892, the packing plants employed 5,000 people in "Packingtown." In 1897 Armour’s South Omaha plant was the nation’s largest. By 1934, the "Big Four" were Armour, Cudahy, Swift and Wilson. The meat packing industry of South Omaha was closely related to the Stockyards. South Omaha relied solely on both of those industries for its growth for more than 100 years.

During this period the Stockyards developed a reliance on several railroads to bring cattle to them, and to ship processed meat to the East. They included the Union Pacific Railroad, Chicago, Burlington & Quincy Railroad, the Missouri Pacific Railroad, the Chicago, Rock Island & Pacific Railroad, the Chicago and North Western Transportation Company, and the Wabash Railroad. They also ran their own line through the South Omaha Terminal Railway.

=== 1950s to 1970s ===
Site plan, 1958

In 1955, Omaha was the only city in the world where Armour, Swift, Cudahy and Wilson each slaughtered cattle, pigs and sheep.

That year, Omaha overtook Chicago as the nation's largest livestock market and meatpacking center, a position it held until 1973. The meatpacking industry had been organized and workers could manage a blue-collar middle class life. The union was interracial and supported the Civil Rights Movement in the 1960s. In 1957, it was estimated that the industries related to the stockyards employed fully one-half of Omaha workers. That same year the Omaha Chamber of Commerce said that "Livestock is Omaha’s lifeblood," and by 1959 the Omaha World-Herald said that the industry was "the backbone of Omaha's economy ever since the first steer trotted into its pens in 1884."

=== Decline and closing ===
Site plan, 1999

In the 1960s, the Stockyards began to lose business due to downturns in the market and changes in the industry. In 1973, the Union Stockyards Company was sold to the Canal Capital Corporation of New York. Led by companies like IBP, the meatpacking industry started moving slaughterhouses closer to cattle feedlots in rural areas, where they hired non-union workers. In Omaha, trading was centered at the Livestock Exchange Building. In 1997, the Stockyards processed 197,575 animals.

In 1989, the Minneapolis-based United Marketing Services purchased the livestock operation from Canal Capital. The facilities fell into disrepair. In 1996 the City of Omaha bought 50 acres (200,000 m^{2}) of land for an office park, and condemned the rest of the facilities, except the Livestock Exchange Building, which was slated for renovation.

=== Redevelopment ===
Today the former site of the Union Stockyards is the site of the Stockyards Historic District redevelopment project. The project includes a new South Omaha campus for the Metropolitan Community College. The Livestock Exchange Building was redeveloped as mixed-use, with more than 100 apartments, community and commercial space, and the City of Omaha partnered with the College to build a new home for the South Omaha Library.

== See also ==
- Animal–industrial complex
- History of Omaha, Nebraska
- List of union stockyards in the United States
