= South Omaha Land Company =

The South Omaha Land Company was created in South Omaha, Nebraska, in 1887. Founders included William A. Paxton.

== History ==
The Union Stock Yards Company of Omaha paid $100,000 to the South Omaha Land Company for 156.5 acres (0.633 km^{2}) of land to serve as a transfer station en route to Chicago. In March 1887, two men named McShane and J. H. Bosler bought out the South Omaha Land Syndicate, immediately forming the South Omaha Land Company with William A. Paxton as president, Bosler as vice-president, Iler as secretary, John A. Creighton as treasure, and Messrs Paxton, Bosler, Iler, Creighton, McShane, Smith, Kountze, Nelson Morris and J. M. Woolworth as directors. A million dollars in stock was soon made available, and the South Omaha Land Syndicate's were paid off, as well

== Syndicate Park ==
In 1887 the South Omaha Land Company developed the land that would become known as Syndicate Park in South Omaha. At the time they spent about $30,000 for improvements, including payment for landscape architects. In 1892, the Company built a seven-foot fence around the property, effectively closing off the park to public use. After battles with residents, the Company sold part of the land for building lots, but agreed to keep a portion open for the public. After South Omaha was annexed by the City of Omaha in 1917, the area became known as Spring Lake Park.

== See also ==
- History of Omaha
