= Frederick Krug =

German-immigrant founder of the Frederick Krug Brewing Company of Omaha, Nebraska

- Born: December 22, 1833; Niederzwehren, Kassel, Germany
- Died: November 18, 1919 (aged 85)
- Occupations: Brewer, Founder of Krug Park

Frederick Krug (December 22, 1833 – November 18, 1919) was the German-immigrant founder of the Frederick Krug Brewing Company of Omaha, Nebraska. Krug is often cited as one of the early settlers of Omaha. In addition to operating the brewery for almost the entire duration of his life, Krug operated Krug Park in the Benson community and was the president of the Home Fire Insurance Company, which was founded in Omaha in 1884.

== Biography ==
Fred Krug was born in Niederzwehren near Kassel in Germany on December 22, 1833. He lived in Niederzwehren until 19 years of age where he was trained as a brewer. He then emigrated to the U.S. in 1852, settling in St. Louis, Missouri. In St. Louis, he met his wife Anna and had a son, William. In 1858, he moved to Council Bluffs where he worked in a small brewery. Later the same year, he moved to Omaha with his wife and son. He established his first small brewery on Farnam Street. Later, his business moved to Jackson Street between 10th and 11th streets. On October 17, 1893, he and his family celebrated the grand opening of the new Fred Krug Brewery. At the time this new brewery was one of the largest and most modern of its kind. Its capacity was reported to be 150,000 barrels per year and they employed approximately 500 men.

Krug led his company in Omaha for almost 50 years, and was responsible for founding Omaha's Krug Park in 1904. The city of Omaha named a street after him. Frederick's sons, including William, Frederick H., Jacob and Albert all worked at the brewery in a variety of capacities. Krug, a German immigrant, served on the State of Nebraska's Board of Immigration.

== Legacy ==
Krug Avenue in South Omaha was named after Krug.

== See also ==
- History of Omaha
- Krug Park (Omaha)
