= Union Stock Yards Company of Omaha =

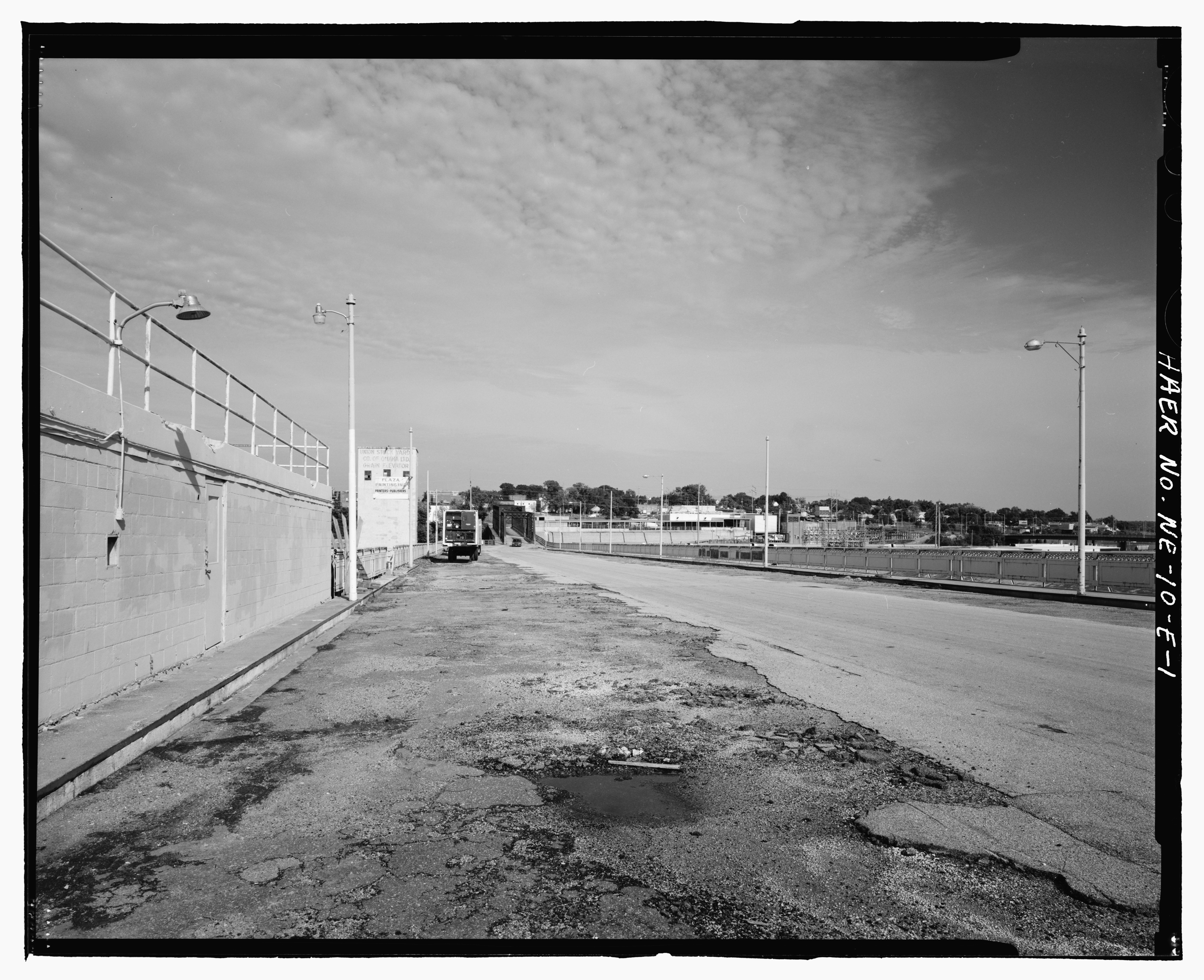
Viaduct deck, Omaha livestock market offices to left. - South Omaha Union Stock Yards, "O" Street Viaduct, "O" Street Spanning Hog Pens; South Omaha Terminal Railway Company Tracks and Union Pacific Railroad Tracks, Omaha, Douglas County, NE

The Union Stock Yards Company of Omaha was a 90-year-old company first founded in South Omaha, Nebraska, in 1878 by John A. Smiley. After being moved to Council Bluffs, Iowa, and dissolved within a year, the company was reorganized and moved to South Omaha in 1883. Six local businessmen responded to a request by Wyoming cattle baron Alexander Swan showing interest in a livestock market closer than the Union Stock Yards in Chicago, Illinois. The Company's Union Stockyards in South Omaha were once a fierce rival of Chicago's Union Stock Yards. The Union Stock Yards Company of Omaha was bought out in 1973.

== History ==
Six local businessmen, including William A. Paxton, Herman Kountze and John A. Creighton, formed the Union Stockyards on December 1, 1883 and purchased 2,000 acres (8.1 km^{2}) of land. At that same point the businessmen formed the South Omaha Land Company, platting the city of South Omaha that same year over the remaining 1,700 acres (6.9 km^{2}). The City of Omaha annexed South Omaha in 1915. At that time related businesses in South Omaha included the Union Stockyards Bank of South Omaha, South Omaha Terminal Railway, the Union Elevator, the Union Trust Company, and the South Omaha Land Syndicate. In 1927 the Union Stock Yards Company of Omaha constructed the Livestock Exchange Building to house its operations.

The meatpacking industry of South Omaha was closely reliant on the Union Stock Yards Company of Omaha, and South Omaha relied solely on both of those industries for its growth for more than 100 years. In 1957 it was estimated that combined the industries employed fully one-half of Omaha workers. After a downturn in the market and changes in the livestock industry, the Union Stock Yards Company of Omaha lost value through the 1960s.

In 1973 the Union Stock Yards Company of Omaha was sold to the Canal Capital Corporation of New York. In 1999 the Union Stockyards were closed by the City of Omaha, and replaced with a business park.

== See also ==
- History of Omaha
- South Omaha
