= South Omaha Terminal Railway =

The South Omaha Terminal Railway in Omaha, Nebraska was a subsidiary of the Union Stock Yards Company of Omaha. Until the separate railroad company was created in July 1927, the trackage, about 17 miles (27 km), was owned and operated directly by the Union Stock Yards Company of Omaha. On April 4, 1978, an Interstate Commerce Commission emergency service order was issued at which time the Brandon Corporation took over service.

The Union Stock Yards Company of Omaha needed a separate line to run cattle to and from the Union Pacific Railroad mainline in downtown Omaha. After building the line, in 1904 the Union Stock Yards Company of Omaha was involved in a U.S. Supreme Court case against the Chicago, Burlington and Quincy Railroad entitled Union Stock Yards Company of Omaha v. Chicago, Burlington and Quincy Railroad. The case addressed liability issues after a defective freight car injured a worker.

The South Omaha Railway used former CB&Q 0-6-0 steam locomotives. During World War II the railroad applied to purchase 5 diesel locomotives from the American Locomotive Company. The basis of the request was that the steam locomotives were worn out and they needed the diesel locomotives to supply meat to the war effort. The request was approved and 5 S-1 locomotives were purchased.

In later years 1 locomotive sat unused in front of the sand blasting building for Nebraska Railcar in Brandon Corporation paint. The body of this locomotive now resides in a scrapyard in Council Bluffs, Iowa. The other locomotives were sold to a railroad in Kansas where they were further dispersed. 1 locomotive is preserved at the Abilene and Smokey Valley Railroad and another is preserved at the Illinois Railway Museum as Nekoosa Paper #14.
