= Potter's Field (Omaha) =

Cemetery in Omaha, Nebraska, US

Coordinates: 41.33184°N 95.99022°W

The Potter's Field Cemetery in Omaha, Nebraska, United States, is located on a 5-acre (20,000 m^{2}) plot of land at 5000 Young Street near the intersections of Young Street and Mormon Bridge Road. Like all potter's fields, it was used to bury poor people or people with no known identity from across the Omaha area. The cemetery was active from 1887 to 1957.

== History ==
The Potter's Field was used as early as 1887, and over the next seventy years almost 4,000 burials were made. However, there were few markers. People who were buried there were too poor to afford burials in regular cemeteries, and therefore were too poor to afford headstones. Burials were commonly made without markers of any sort. There is speculation that Mormon pioneers from Cutler's Park were buried here in the 1850s, as well. A partial list of the individuals who are buried at Potter's Field and any details is listed in the US GenWeb Archives. It also indicates whether the person's remains were removed or moved from the cemetery.

Despite being owned by Douglas County, the cemetery fell into disrepair from the late 1950s through the 1980s. In 1986 a volunteer group rehabilitated Potter's Field, adding a walkway and meditation area, as well as a listing of every burial accounted for in government and the neighboring Forest Lawn Cemetery records. Potter's Field was reconsecrated in September, 1986.

Perhaps the most notorious interment in Potter's Field was that of Will Brown, an African American civilian who was lynched in downtown Omaha in 1919. Brown was accused of raping a white woman and was lynched in front of the Douglas County Courthouse. On October 1, 1919 Brown was laid to rest, with the interment log listing only one word next to his name: "Lynched."

== See also ==
- Douglas County Poor Farm
- Potter's Field
- List of cemeteries in Omaha
