= Gibson Bend =

Bend in the Missouri River, USA

The Gibson Bend of the Missouri River is a meander located in Pottawattamie County, Iowa and Douglas County, Nebraska, located at 41°11′15″N 95°55′15″W. The Gibson neighborhood is a community area in Omaha, Nebraska abutting the Gibson Bend.

== Location ==
The Gibson Bend of the Missouri River is located in Omaha, Nebraska approximately where Hascall Street would intersect the river. The Gibson yards of the Burlington Northern Railroad are also located at this bend in the river on the bottoms. In 1952 the flood was contained by the dike built there from soil taken out of the hills behind Burlington's roundhouse. Interstate 80 went over the Missouri River at that point.

== Indian Mounds ==
Located exactly ten miles above the Platte River, it was in this spot that explorers Lewis and Clark placed mounds on their maps and mentioned them in their journals. Noting a few dozen "Indian Mounds" in the area, they suggested the mounds covered a location of approximately two hundred acres. Clark drew these on his map with x's and triangles suggesting the area was the site of an ancient village of the Otoes and some of the crew swam the horses over and examined them for a day.

However, in 2002, the Nebraska Department of Roads conducted an archeological survey of the Gibson area. Working in conjunction with the Nebraska State Historical Society, they concluded all archeological deposits were destroyed by previous re-grading and terracing, and there are no archeological sites there today.

== Gibson Neighborhood ==
Gibson was a historic neighborhood bordered on the east by the river and the west by Riverview Boulevard, on the north by Bancroft Street and the south by Grover Street. It was south of the Spring Lake neighborhood and north of the Brown Park neighborhood. Today, the Henry Doorly Zoo abuts the former Gibson neighborhood to the southwest.

Between 1895 and 1920, several Mexican families established themselves in colonias next to the Chicago, Burlington, and Quincy Railroad depot south of Little Italy and Little Bohemia. The depot was called Gibson Station, and was located at South First and Hascal Streets. These families were the early foundation of the Gibson neighborhood.

From the 1910s through the 1950s, the Gibson neighborhood consisted of about eighty homes in the area. There was supposedly a beanery and a grain elevator, as well as the Burlington Northern roundhouse and railroad shops. Much of the neighborhood was removed during the construction of the South Omaha Veterans Memorial Bridge in the 1930s. By the time that bridge was demolished in 2010 after being replaced, all remnants of the Gibson neighborhood were gone. According to local historian Orville D. Menard, it was in this neighborhood that notorious Omaha crime lord Tom Dennison was responsible for seeding the riots that led to the 1919 lynching of Will Brown.

Presently, there are no signs left of the one-time homes and industry there.

== See also ==
- Neighborhoods of Omaha
- History of Omaha, Nebraska
- Pottawattamie County, Iowa
