= Camp Dump strike =

1882 labor dispute in Omaha, Nebraska

- Date: March 9, 1882
- Location: Omaha, Nebraska United States
- Goals: Wage increase
- Methods: Striking, picketing

Parties
Railroad workers	Burlington Railroad; Neb. National Guard; Federal troops

Lead figures
	Lt. Erastus Benson; Gov. Albinus Nance

Casualties and losses
1 railroad worker killed	None

The Camp Dump strike was a labor dispute that began on March 9, 1882 at the Burlington Yards in Omaha, Nebraska. The event pitted state militia against unionized strikers. It was reportedly the first strike by organized labor in Nebraska and the first Omaha riot to receive national attention.

== Events ==
Approximately 75 workers from a Burlington Railroad grading operation began picketing at the Burlington dumping yards in Omaha. After being paid $1.25 per ten-hour day since their job began, they struck for $1.75 and rejected a compromise offer of $1.40. After parading around Downtown Omaha, the strikers formed a picket line at the dump for better pay. Hundreds of workers from other industries joined the strike in solidarity.

Nebraska Governor Albinus Nance called in the Nebraska state militia to subdue the strikers. On March 12, eight companies arrived in Omaha with the stated purpose of protecting strikebreakers. The city's first Catholic Church was used as a headquarters for the militiamen. Soon after their arrival, rioting began. During this initial surge of violence, a striker whose last name was Armstrong was killed after he tried to cross strike lines and was bayoneted by the militia.

Omaha pioneer Erastus Benson was the first lieutenant of Company H in the First Nebraska National Guards during this period. After the death, he was put in charge of the Nebraska militia. U.S. Army soldiers stationed at Fort Omaha arrived as well, bringing Gatling guns and a cannon with them.

The Army's arrival is credited with ending the violence and the strike. A number of strike leaders were arrested for "assault with intent to kill" because of fights that broke out among the picketers.

== Bibliography ==
- Gephart, R.M. (1965) "Politicians, Soldiers and Strikers: The Reorganization of the Nebraska Militia and the Omaha Strike of 1882." Nebraska History, 45 (March), pp. 89–120.

== See also ==
- Timeline of riots and civil unrest in Omaha, Nebraska
- History of Omaha
- Crime in Omaha
