= Tom Dennison (political boss) =

American politician

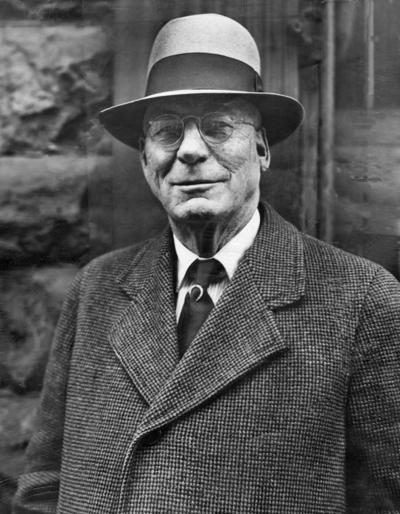
- Tom Dennison circa 1930

Boss of the Omaha, Nebraska political machine
- In office 1900–1934

Personal details
- Born: October 26, 1858 Delhi, Iowa, U.S.
- Died: February 14, 1934 (aged 75) Chula Vista, California, U.S.
- Party: Democratic
- Spouse(s): Ada Provost Dennison (m. 1893; died 1922) Neva Jo Truman Dennison (m. 1930; div. 1933)
- Children: 3
- Nickname: "The Old Grey Wolf"

Tom Dennison, known as Pickhandle or Old Grey Wolf, (October 26, 1858 – February 14, 1934) was an American political boss and racketeer in Omaha, Nebraska. A politically savvy, culturally astute gambler, Dennison was in charge of numerous, citywide crime rings, including prostitution, gambling and bootlegging in the 1920s. Dennison is credited with electing "Cowboy" James Dahlman mayor of Omaha eight times, and when losing an election, inciting the Omaha Race Riot of 1919 in retribution against the candidate who won.

== Early life ==
One of eight children born to Irish immigrant parents, John Henry Dennison and Anna (née McConnell) Dennison, Tom Dennison came to Nebraska from Iowa in 1860 at the age of two. When he was young, Dennison traveled throughout the West as a prospector, saloon-keeper, gambler and robber. Dennison had owned and operated gambling houses such as the Opera House Gambling Saloon in Leadville, Colorado and the Board of Trade saloon in Butte, Montana.

== Arrival in Omaha ==
There are so many laws that people are either law breakers or hypocrites. For my part, I hate a damn hypocrite.

— Tom Dennison

Tom Dennison was thirty-four when he arrived in Omaha in 1892 with $75,000 in cash. Upon surveying the city, he found Omaha to be a "wide open town", meaning there was little legal control over gambling, liquor, prostitution and other criminal interests. Dennison soon became known as the city's "King Gambler" and first entered the political arena around 1900 as a way of protecting his interests. Dennison never actually held public office, instead buying influence through lavish campaign contributions and his ability to get out the vote.

Dennison acted as a power broker between the business community and the local vice lords. His gambling operations were mainly located in Omaha's third ward. He actively worked with local temperance groups to eliminate half of the saloons in Omaha — reputedly, the half he didn't control. Dennison operated a private bank at 1409 Douglas Street, the site of the current Union Pacific Center, lending money and providing a discreet repository for those who shunned traditional banks. For more than 25 years, his power was such that no crime occurred in the city without his blessing, the police reported to him daily, and the mayor himself answered directly to him. Dennison once explained his law theory to the Omaha Bee, saying, "There are so many laws that people are either law breakers or hypocrites. For my part, I hate a damn hypocrite."

Early in 1918 Dennison was the subject of a sensational trial. During the proceedings, Dennison himself admitted that one of his "roadhouses" operated for more than 10 years without a license. He explained he was making side payments to a county commissioner for "protection from the law."

Dennison controlled Omaha politics throughout his reign. His approval to run for office was gained through payment of bribes and by supporting the rest of Dennison's political slate. In 1906, Omaha Republicans supporting the Progressive Movement nominated a reformer named Erastus Benson for Mayor, and Dennison was afraid that Benson would come out in favor of prohibition. Omaha Democrats nominated James C. "Cowboy Jim" Dahlman, a popular, first-time candidate. Dahlman seemed to be more tolerant of Dennison's "Sporting District", so Dennison supported him. Dahlman was elected mayor that year, and in eight out of nine subsequent campaigns for mayor between 1906 and 1930; Dahlman's losing the election in 1918 was part of the background to racial violence in Omaha.

== Lynching of Will Brown ==
In 1916 Nebraska passed a state constitutional amendment allowing for prohibition, and in the late 1910s, Dennison's political power waned. Omahans, fed up with Dennison's corrupt style, voted in Edward Parsons Smith, a reform-minded candidate committed to "cleaning up Omaha", as mayor in 1918. Boss Dennison nursed a grudge against Mayor Smith that is ultimately attributed with leading to the Omaha Race Riot of 1919. That year the Omaha Bee newspaper, founded by Edward Rosewater in the previous century, luridly reported on fictitious assaults on white women by black men. Each new story questioned Mayor Smith's ability to run the city. This, along with economic conditions facing recent veterans returning from World War I, led to increased racial tension throughout Omaha.

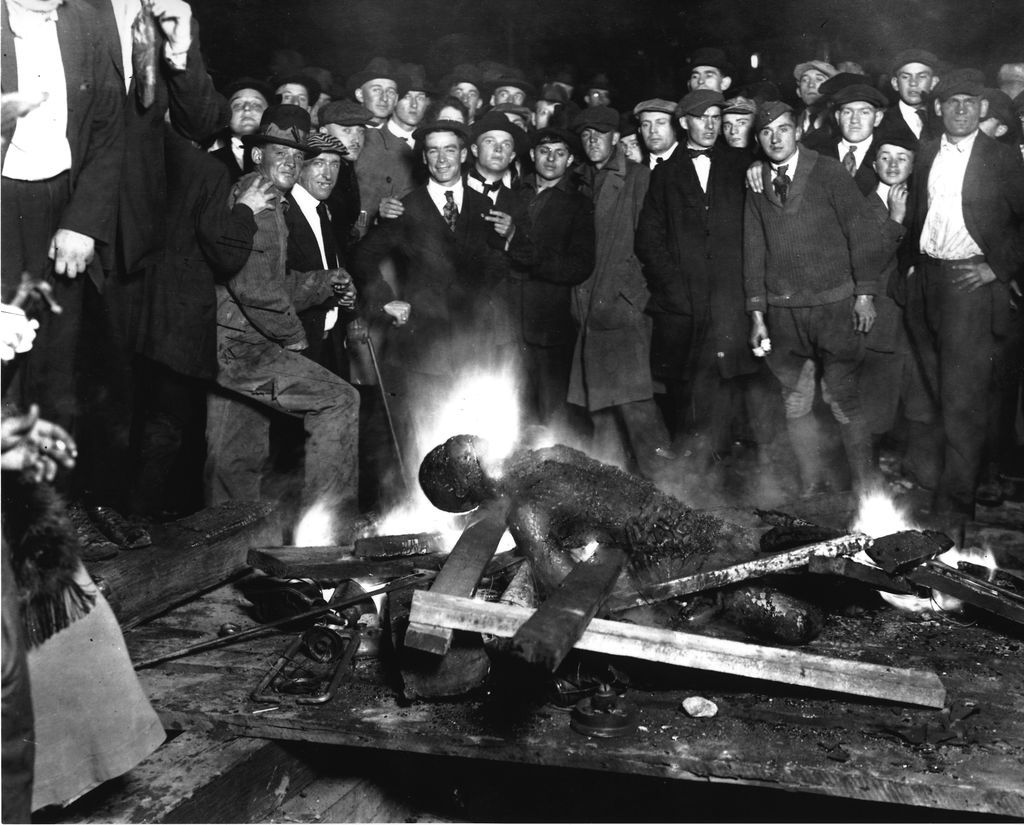
The Body of Will Brown after his lynching

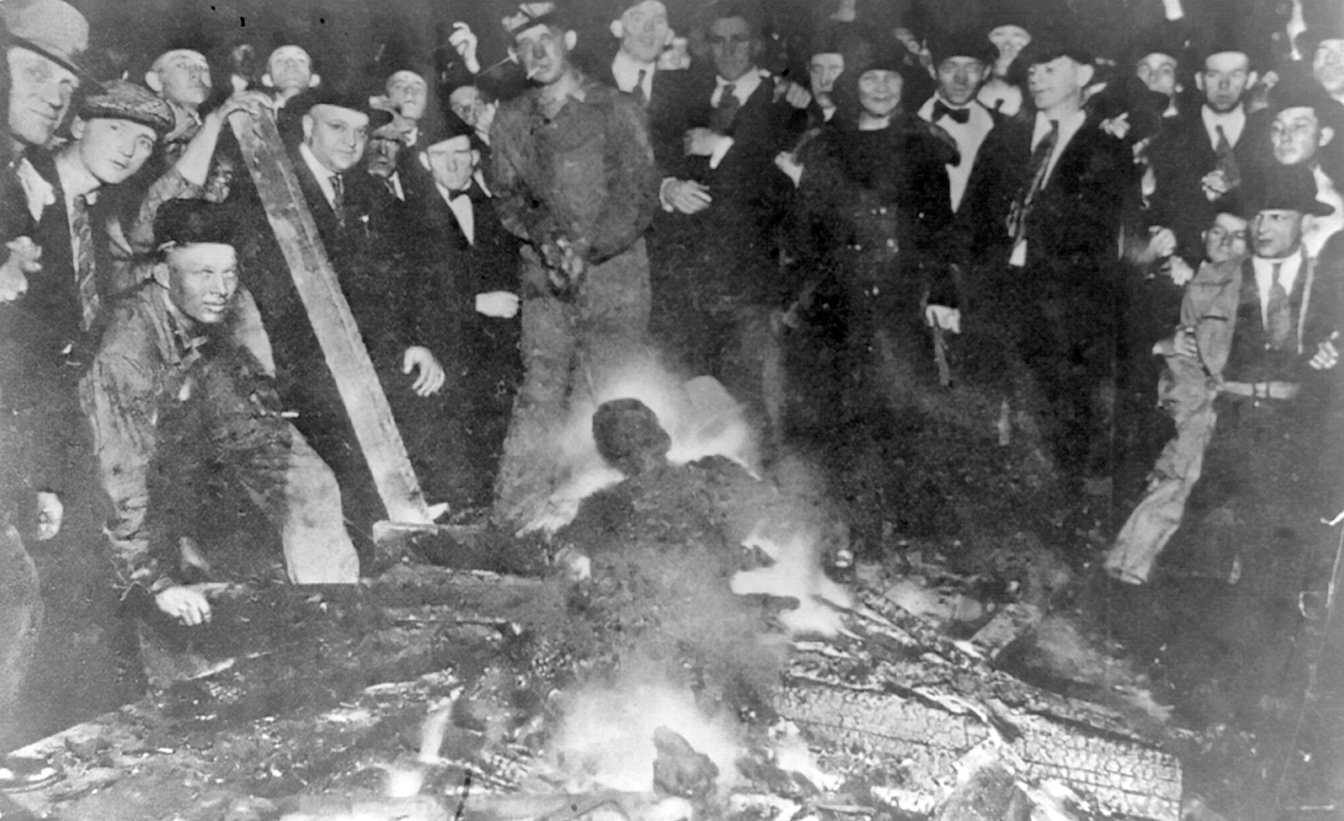

On September 28, 1919, a white mob launched a riot resulting in the brutal lynching death of black civilian Will Brown, the death of two white rioters, the injuries of many Omaha Police Department officers and civilians (including the attempted hanging of Mayor Smith), and a public rampage that included the burning of the Douglas County Courthouse in downtown Omaha. The rioting in Omaha ended a day later, after 1,700 federal troops from nearby Fort Omaha and Fort Crook came to the city which restored order and peace throughout the area. Police compiled a list of 300 alleged participants, with Dennison's "right-hand man" Milton Hoffman high on the list. Hoffman was accused of leading the mob from South Omaha to the Douglas County Courthouse and whipping them into a frenzy. Dennison got Hoffman out of the city before he could be arrested.

In the trials that followed, a turncoat from Dennison's machine said he had heard Boss Dennison, boasting that some of the assailants were white Dennison operatives disguised in blackface. This was corroborated by police reports that one white attacker was still wearing the make-up when apprehended. As in many other Dennison-related cases, no one was ever found guilty for their participation in the riot. A later grand jury hearing corroborated this claim, stating "Several reported assaults on white women had actually been perpetrated by whites in blackface." They went on to report that the riot was planned and begun by "the vice element of the city." The riot "was not a casual affair; it was premeditated and planned by those secret and invisible forces that today are fighting you and the men who represent good government."

== Prohibition era ==
During the 1920s, the Eighteenth Amendment and the Volstead Act effectively ended the mainstream distribution of alcohol in Omaha and across the United States. Early in this period Dennison formed the Omaha Liquor Syndicate to monopolize the bootleg liquor trade in Omaha. Dennison also developed alliances with Al Capone in Chicago and Tom Pendergast in Kansas City. This led to violence among the city's bootleggers, culminating in the 1931 murder of Harry Lapidus, a local businessman and outspoken opponent of the Dennison machine. Police never solved the murder of Lapidus; however, in the wake of the murder public opinion turned against Dennison.

It was during this time that Dennison most strongly exerted his influence in state politics. After vigorously opposing a plan to have a single election commissioner law for Omaha, in the 1920s Dennison also fought against statewide plan, leading state legislators to back off from their plan until after his death. Dennison was also strongly in control of the city's political element; a survey in 1929 found more than 1,500 outlets in the city selling alcohol. A campaign by state officials, including several raids, drove several establishments underground; however, Dennison encouraged the transformation of the industry, leading saloons to become cocktail lounges and taverns. Because of him, Omaha remained a "boisterous town".

During this period it was said that there was no crime that happened in the city without Dennison knowing about it beforehand. Dennison maintained several offices around downtown Omaha, connecting them by tunnels. His influence over the mayor helped Dennison install family members in city jobs all over Omaha. In this same time frame Dennison also ran Omaha's Flatiron Building at 1722 St. Mary's Avenue as a refuge for mobsters running from the law in Kansas City, Chicago and St. Louis.

Dennison's key lieutenant and business manager during Prohibition was local power broker William "Billy" Nesselhous, who ran most gambling operations, speakeasies and brothels in the city.

== Final years ==
In June 1932 Dennison suffered, and recovered from, a paralytic stroke. In August of that year Dennison and 58 of his associates went on trial for conspiracy to violate the Volstead Act. Tom Dennison was indicted in the liquor conspiracy case; however, the trial resulted in a hung jury and was declared a mistrial. That December he nearly died from pneumonia.

In August 1933, Dennison was divorced by his 20-year-old wife, Neva Jo Truman Dennison. The political ticket Dennison was running was defeated in elections throughout Omaha later that year. Dennison and his associates were acquitted of conspiracy in January 1934. The following month, while visiting associates near Chula Vista, California in February 1934, aged 75, he was fatally injured in an auto accident. He was survived by his daughter. He had fathered three children with his first wife, two of whom died in infancy. His funeral on February 20, 1934, at St. Peter's Catholic Church in Omaha was attended by more than a thousand people, reportedly representing Omaha's business, official and sporting interests. One hundred eight cars made up the procession to Forest Lawn Cemetery. Throughout his life Dennison maintained he had no control over city politics, and repeatedly pronounced that he never hurt anyone.

== Legacy ==
Boss Dennison's thirty-year reign over Omaha politics is seen today as a hallmark in the city's history, causing Omaha to resemble Eastern cities more than other Midwestern cities, including Omaha's neighbor, Lincoln. His death ended the reign of his political machine, causing Omaha to have "formless politics" for the following 50 years.

Dennison was fictionalized as a character in two recent novels set during the machine era in Omaha: Kings of Broken Things (2017) by Theodore Wheeler and World, Chase Me Down (2017) by Andrew Hilleman.

== See also ==
- History of Omaha, Nebraska
- Bossism
- Political machine
- Political boss

== Bibliography ==
- Davis, J.K. (1977) "The Gray Wolf: Tom Dennison of Omaha," Nebraska History, Vol. 58 (1) Spring.
- Menard, O.D. (1987) "Tom Dennison, The Omaha Bee, and the 1919 Omaha Race Riot." Nebraska History Quarterly. Vol. 68(4). Winter.
