= Omaha race riot of 1919 =

Racial violence in Omaha, Nebraska, United States

Omaha Race Riot
- Part of the Red Summer
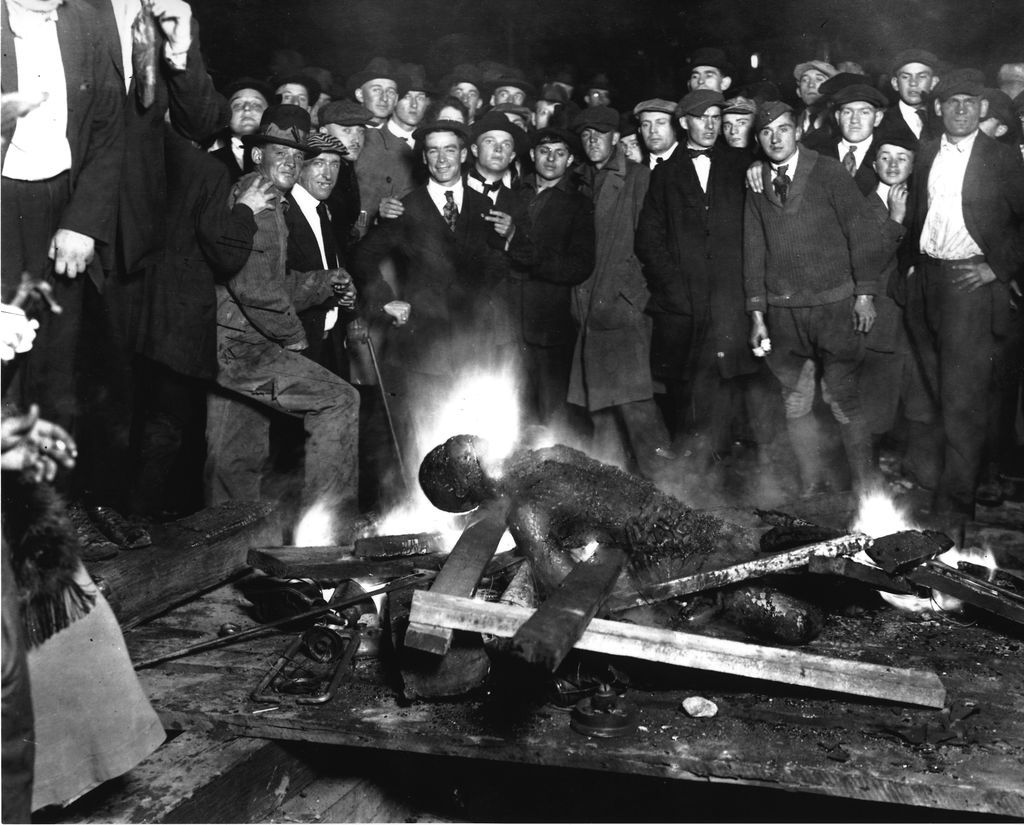
- Photograph taken showing the body of Will Brown after being burned by a white lynch mob.
- Date: September 28–29, 1919 (2 days)
- Location: Omaha, Nebraska, United States
- Caused by: Racial discrimination
- Methods: Rioting, race riots, protests, looting, attacks, lynching
- Result: Order Restoration: lynching of Will Brown, African American suppressed until 1950s; Order Restoration in City of Omaha, Mayor Edward Smith survived, not running for reelection; Ku Klux Klan became established in Omaha in 1921

Parties
| United States government: 20th Infantry Regiment; Government of Nebraska: Nebraska Army National Guard; Douglas County: Douglas County Police Department; City of Omaha: Omaha Police Department; Support: NAACP | Rioters, protesters Support: Ku Klux Klan |

Lead figures
| Edward Parsons Smith (WIA); Michael Clark; Henry W. Dunn (United States) John E. Morris | Tom Dennison; Milton Hoffman; Agnes Loebeck |

Number
| September 28: ~300 policemen September 31: (United States) ~2,000 troops | September 28: 5,000–20,000 men and women |

Casualties and losses
| | 1 white rioter killed |
- One black civilian lynched One white civilian killed

Casualties
- Deaths: 3
- Injuries: 21
- Arrested: 101+

The Omaha Race Riot occurred in Omaha, Nebraska, September 28–29, 1919. The race riot resulted in the lynching of Will Brown, a black civilian; the death of two white rioters; the injuries of many Omaha Police Department officers and civilians, including the attempted hanging of Mayor Edward Parsons Smith; and a public rampage by thousands of white rioters who set fire to the Douglas County Courthouse in downtown Omaha. It followed more than 20 race riots that occurred in major industrial cities and certain rural areas of the United States during the Red Summer of 1919.

== Background ==
Three weeks before the riot, federal investigators had noted that "a clash was imminent owing to ill-feeling between white and black workers in the stockyards." The number of African-Americans in Omaha doubled during the decade 1910–1920, as they were recruited to work in the meatpacking industry. In 1910, Omaha had the third largest black population among the new western cities that had become destinations following Reconstruction and during the Great Migration that started in the 1910s. By 1920, the black population more than doubled to over 10,000, second only to Los Angeles with nearly 16,000. It was ahead of San Francisco, Oakland, Topeka, and Denver.

The major meatpacking plants hired black people as strikebreakers in 1917. South Omaha's working-class whites showed great hostility toward black strikebreakers. By this time, the ethnic Irish—the largest and earliest group of immigrants—had established their power base in the city. Several years earlier, following the death of an Irish policeman, ethnic Irish had led a mob in an attack on Greektown, driving the Greek community from Omaha.

The city's criminal establishment, led by Tom Dennison and teamed with the Omaha Business Men's Association, created a formidable challenge for the moralistic administration of first-term reform mayor Edward Parsons Smith. With little support from the Omaha City Council or the city's labor unions, Smith wearily worked through his reform agenda. Following several strikes throughout the previous year, two detectives with Omaha Police Department's "morals squad" shot and killed an African American bellhop on September 11.

Reports of the alleged rape of 19-year-old Agnes Loebeck on September 25, 1919, triggered the violence associated with Will Brown's lynching. The following day, police arrested 41-year-old Will Brown as a suspect. Loebeck identified Brown as her rapist; however, during questioning, Brown stated that Loebeck did not make a positive identification, which Loebeck later refuted. There was an unsuccessful attempt to lynch Brown on the day of his arrest.

The Omaha Bee, which published a series of articles about many incidents of black crimes, publicized the incident as one of a series of attacks on white women by black men. A political machine opposed to the newly elected reform administration of Mayor Smith controlled the Omaha Bee. It highlighted alleged incidents of "black criminality" to embarrass the new administration.

== Riot ==
=== Beginning ===
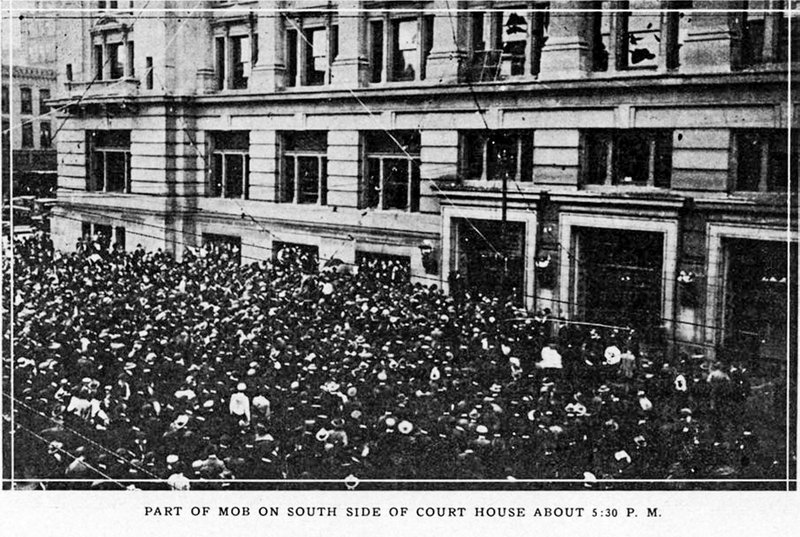
Rioters on the south side of the Douglas County Courthouse in Omaha.

At about 2 p.m. on Sunday, September 28, 1919, a large group of white youths gathered near the Bancroft School in South Omaha and began a march to the Douglas County Courthouse, where Brown was being held. The march was intercepted by John T. Dunn, chief of the Omaha Detective Bureau, and his subordinates. Dunn attempted to disperse the crowd, but they ignored his warning and marched on. Thirty police officers were guarding the courthouse when the marchers arrived. By 4 p.m., the crowd had grown much larger. Members of the crowd bantered with the officers until the police were convinced that the crowd posed no serious threat. A report to that effect was made to the central police station, and the captain in charge sent fifty reserve officers home for the day.

=== Riot ===
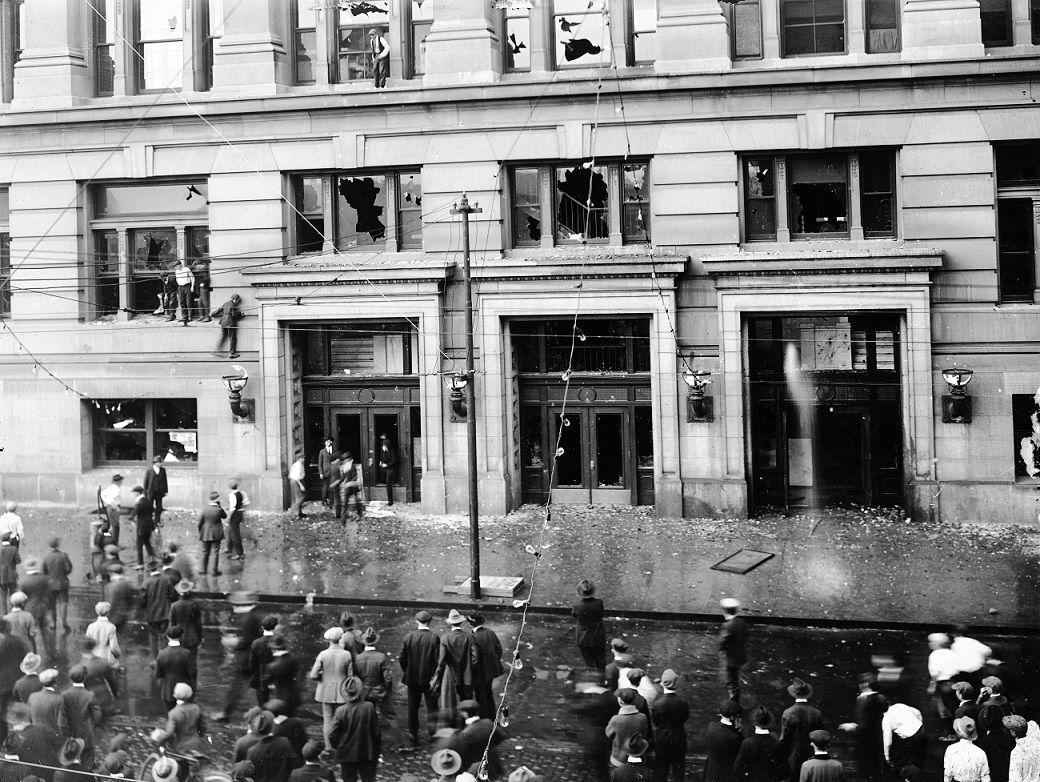
Riots break windows broken out, people climbing the Douglas County Courthouse.

By 5 p.m., a mob of between 5,000 and 15,000 people had crowded into the street on the south side of the Douglas County Courthouse. They began to assault the police officers, pushing one through a pane of glass in a door and attacking two others who had wielded clubs at the mob. At 5:15 p.m., officers deployed fire hoses to dispel the crowd, but they responded with a shower of bricks and sticks. Nearly every window on the south side of the courthouse was broken. The crowd stormed the lower doors of the courthouse, and the police inside discharged their weapons down an elevator shaft in an attempt to frighten them, but this further incited the mob. They again rushed the police who were standing guard outside the building, broke through their lines, and entered the courthouse through a broken basement door.

It was at this moment that Marshal Eberstein, chief of police, arrived. He asked leaders of the mob to give him a chance to talk to the crowd. He mounted to one of the window sills. Beside him was a recognized chief of the mob. At the request of its leader, the crowd stilled its clamor for a few minutes. Chief Eberstein tried to tell the mob that its mission would best be served by letting justice take its course. The crowd refused to listen. Its members howled so that the chief's voice did not carry more than a few feet. Eberstein ceased his attempt to talk and entered the besieged building.

By 6 p.m., throngs swarmed about the courthouse on all sides. The crowd wrestled revolvers, badges, and caps from policemen. They chased and beat every African American who ventured into the vicinity. White civilians who attempted to rescue black civilians were subjected to physical abuse. The police had lost control of the crowd.

By 7 p.m., most of the policemen had withdrawn to the interior of the courthouse. There, they joined forces with Michael Clark, sheriff of Douglas County, who had summoned his deputies to the building with the hope of preventing the capture of Brown. The policemen and sheriffs formed their line of last resistance on the fourth floor of the courthouse.

The police were not successful in their efforts. Before 8 p.m., they discovered that the crowd had set the courthouse building on fire. Its leaders had tapped a nearby gasoline filling station and saturated the lower floors with the flammable liquid.

=== Escalation ===
Shots were fired as the mob pillaged hardware stores in the business district and entered pawnshops, seeking firearms. Police records showed that more than 1,000 revolvers and shotguns were stolen that night. The mob shot at any policeman; seven officers received gunshot wounds, although none of the wounds were serious.

Louis Young, 16 years old, was fatally shot in the stomach while leading a gang up to the fourth floor of the building. Witnesses said the youth was the most intrepid of the mob's leaders. Pandemonium reigned outside the building. At Seventeenth and Douglas Streets, one block from the courthouse, James Hiykel, a 34-year-old businessman, was shot and killed.

The mob continued to strike the courthouse with bullets and rocks, and many civilians were caught in the midst of the mayhem. Spectators were shot while women were thrown to the ground and trampled. Black people were dragged from streetcars and beaten. Many members of the mob even inflicted minor wounds upon themselves.

=== First hanging ===
About 11 o'clock, when the frenzy was at its height, Mayor Edward Smith came out of the east door of the courthouse into Seventeenth Street. He had been in the burning building for hours. As he emerged from the doorway, a shot rang out.

"He shot me. Mayor Smith shot me," a young man in the uniform of a United States soldier yelled. The crowd surged toward the mayor. He fought them. One man hit the mayor on the head with a baseball bat. Another slipped the noose of a rope around his neck. The crowd started to drag him away.

"If you must hang somebody, then let it be me," the mayor said.

The mob dragged the mayor into Harney Street. A woman reached out and tore the noose from his neck. Men in the mob replaced it. Civilians wrestled the mayor from his captors and placed him in a police automobile. The throng overturned the car and grabbed him again. Once more, the rope encircled the mayor's neck. He was carried to Sixteenth and Harney Streets. There he was hanged from the metal arm of a traffic signal tower.

Smith was suspended in the air when State Agent Ben Danbaum drove a high-powered automobile into the throng right to the base of the signal tower. In the car with Danbaum were City Detectives Al Anderson, Charles Van Deusen and Lloyd Toland. They grasped the mayor and Russell Norgard untied the noose. The detectives brought the mayor to Ford Hospital. There he lingered between life and death for several days, finally recovering. "They shall not get him. Mob rule will not prevail in Omaha," the mayor kept muttering during his delirium.

=== Siege of the courthouse ===
Meanwhile, the plight of the police in the courthouse had become desperate. The fire had spread to the third floor, and officers faced the prospect of burning to death. Appeals for help to the crowd below brought only bullets and curses. The mob frustrated all attempts to raise ladders to the imprisoned police. "Bring Brown with you and you can come down," somebody in the crowd shouted.

On the second floor of the building, three policemen and a newspaper reporter were imprisoned in a safety vault, whose thick metal door the mob had shut. The four men hacked their way out through the courthouse wall. The mob shot at them as they squirmed out of the stifling vault.

The gases of formaldehyde added to the terrors of the men imprisoned within the flaming building. Several jars of the chemical had burst on the stairway, and its deadly fumes mounted to the upper floors. Two policemen were overcome.

Sheriff Clark led the 121 prisoners to the roof. Will Brown, for whom the mob was howling, became hysterical. Fellow prisoners allegedly tried to throw him off the roof, but Deputy Sheriffs Hoye and McDonald foiled the attempt.

Sheriff Clark ordered that female prisoners be taken from the building due to their distress. They ran down the burning staircases clad only in prison pajamas. Some of them fainted on the way. Members of the mob escorted them through the smoke and flames. Black women as well as white women were helped to safety.

The mob poured more gasoline into the building. They cut every line of hose that firemen laid from nearby hydrants. The flames were spreading rapidly upward, and death seemed certain for the prisoners and their protectors.

=== Lynching of Will Brown ===
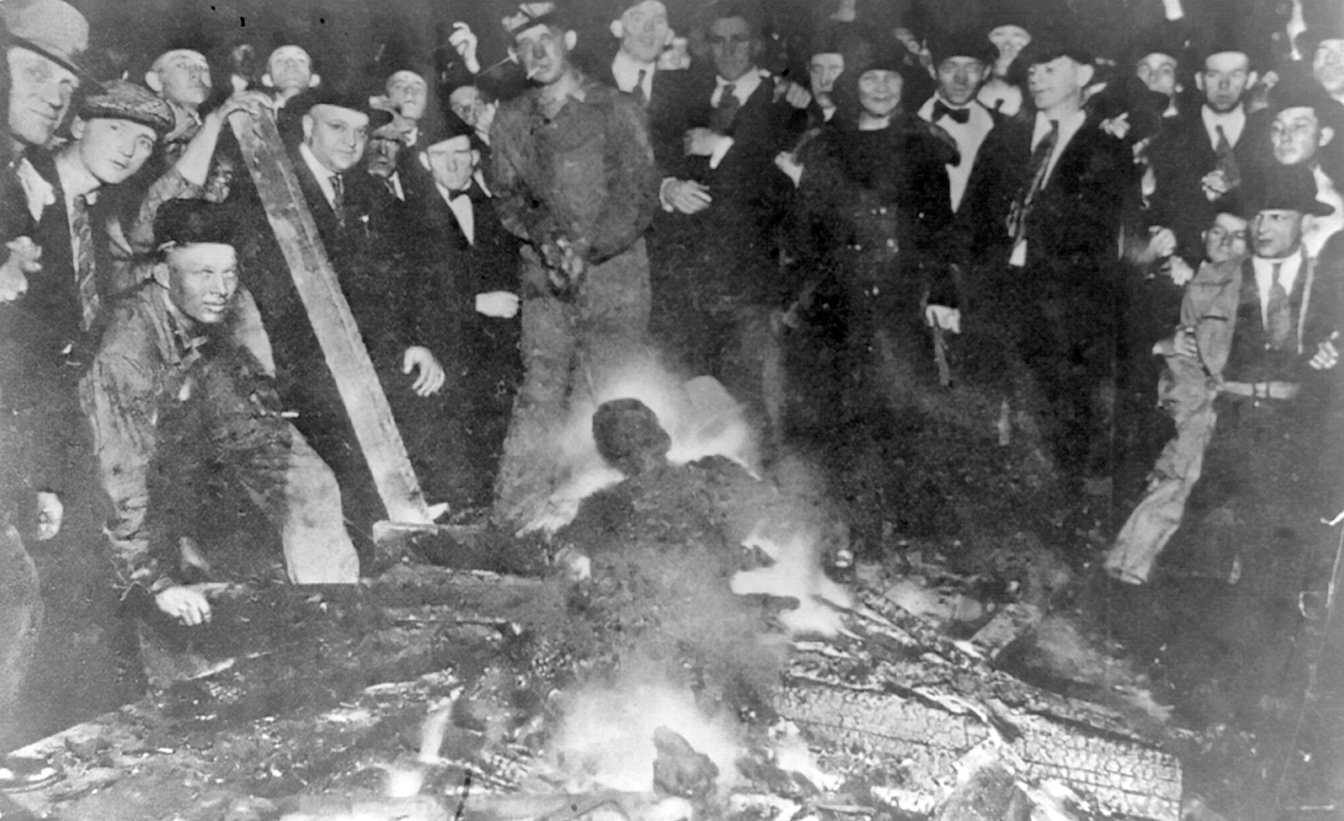
The sight of Will Brown lynched, with his body mutilated and burned by a white crowd.

Three slips of paper were thrown from the fourth floor on the west side of the building. On one piece was scrawled: "The judge says he will give up Negro Brown. He is in dungeon. There are 100 white prisoners on the roof. Save them."

Another note read: "Come to the fourth floor of the building and we will hand the negro over to you."

The mob in the street cheered at the last message. Boys and young men placed firemen's ladders against the building. They mounted to the second story. One man had a heavy coil of rope on his back, and another carried a shotgun.

Two or three minutes after the unidentified men had climbed to the fourth floor, a mighty shout and a fusillade of shots were heard from the south side of the building.

Will Brown had been captured. A few minutes later, his corpse was hanging from a telephone post at Eighteenth and Harney Streets. Hundreds of revolvers and shotguns were fired at the corpse as it dangled in mid-air. Then, the rope was cut. Brown's body was tied to the rear end of an automobile. It was dragged through the streets to Seventeenth and Dodge Streets, four blocks away. The oil from red lanterns used as danger signals for street repairs was poured on the corpse. It was burned. Members of the mob hauled the charred remains through the business district for several hours.

Sheriff Clark said that black prisoners hurled Brown into the hands of the mob as its leaders approached the stairway leading to the county jail. Clark also reported that Brown moaned "I am innocent, I never did it; my God, I am innocent," as he was surrendered to the mob. Newspapers have quoted alleged leaders of the mob as saying that Brown was shoved at them through a blinding smoke by persons whom they could not see.

== Aftermath ==
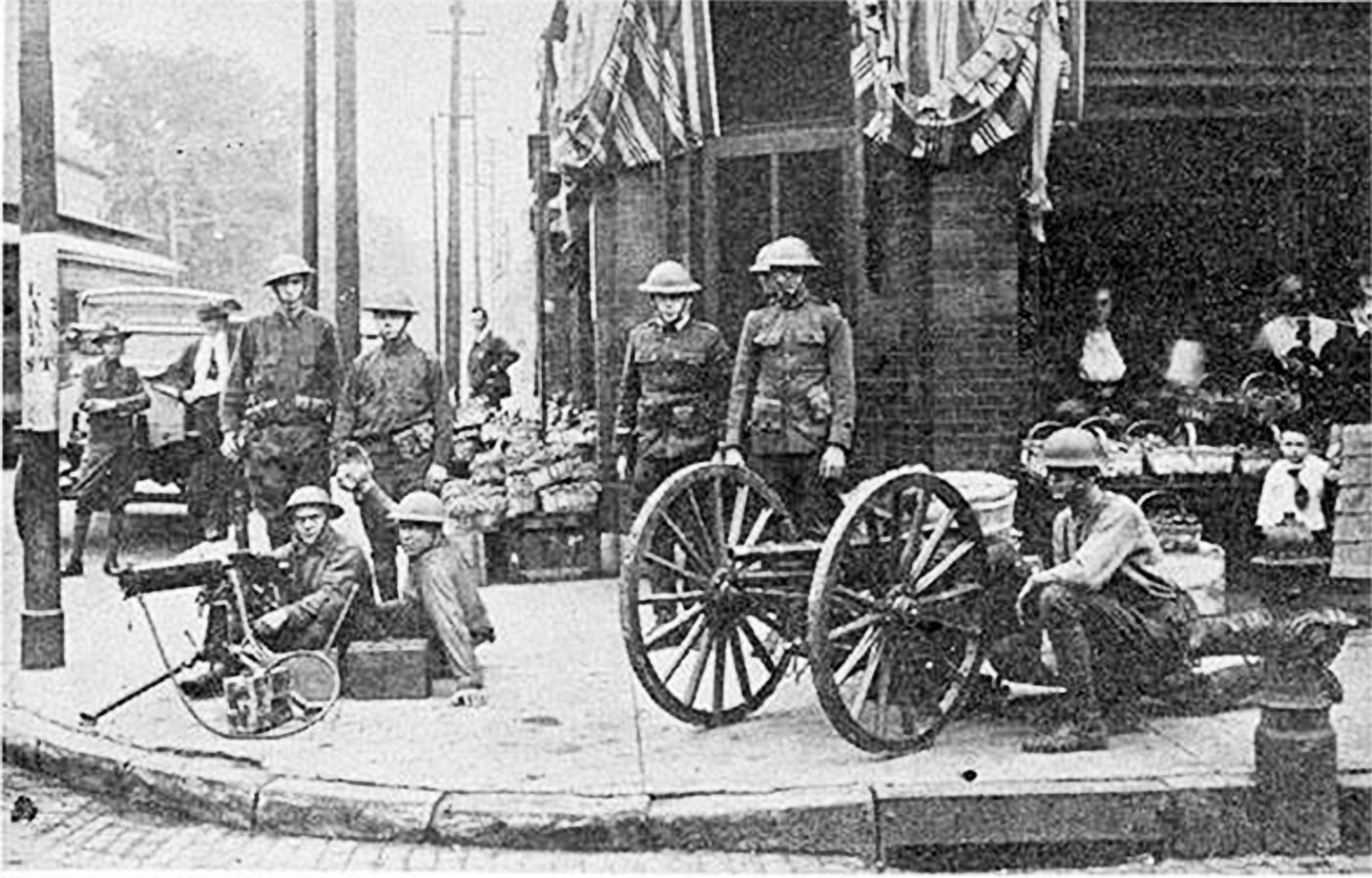
Army soldiers man an M1917 Browning machine gun and a 37mm 1916 support gun at North 24th and Lake streets in North Omaha.

The lawlessness continued for several hours after Brown had been lynched. Both the police patrol and emergency automobile were burned. Three times, the mob went to the city jail. The third time its leaders announced that they were going to burn it (but never did). Meanwhile, Omaha officials requested assistance from the United States Army, which had been going on long before Brown was killed.

The riot lasted until 3 a.m., on the morning of September 29. At that hour, federal troops, under command of Colonel John E. Morris of the 20th Infantry, arrived from Fort Omaha and Fort Crook. Troops manning machine guns were placed in the heart of Omaha's business district; in North Omaha, the center of the black community, to protect civilians there; and in South Omaha, to prevent more mobs from forming. Major General Leonard Wood, commander of the Central Department, came the next day to Omaha by order of Secretary of War Newton D. Baker. Peace was enforced by 1,600 soldiers.

By September 30, the city was described by a New York Times correspondent as "quiet" with around 800 soldiers patrolling streets and 500 troops held in reserve to respond to any further emergencies, and an Army balloon was deployed over the city.

Martial law was not formally proclaimed in Omaha, but it was effectively enacted throughout the city. By the request of City Commissioner W.G. Ure, who was acting mayor, Wood also took control over the police department.

On October 1, 1919, Brown was laid to rest in Omaha's Potters Field. The interment log listed only one word next to his name: "Lynched".

== Causes and consequences ==
The Omaha Riot was denounced throughout the country. The arrest and prosecution of mob leaders was widely demanded. Police and military authorities apprehended 100 of the participants on charges ranging from murder to arson and held them for trial.

General Wood initially blamed the disturbance on the Industrial Workers of the World. The district court ordered a grand jury to convene and investigate the riots, and a grand jury was impaneled on October 8. After a six-week session, the grand jury issued a report that criticized the Smith administration for ineffective leadership and police incompetence. Army witnesses testified to their belief that more prompt police action could have controlled the riot. One hundred and twenty indictments were handed down for involvement in the riots.

Of the 120 persons indicted for involvement in the riot, most were never successfully prosecuted, and all were eventually released after serving no term of imprisonment.

=== Newspapers ===
Reverend Charles E. Cobbey, the pastor of the First Christian Church, blamed the Omaha Bee for inflaming the situation. He was reported to have said, "It is the belief of many that the entire responsibility for the outrage can be placed at the feet of a few men and one Omaha paper." The inflammatory yellow journalism of the Bee is credited by several historians for stoking emotions for the riot.

The U.S. Army was critical of the Omaha police for their failure to disperse the crowd before it grew too large. Other critics believe the Army was slow to respond to the crisis; this was a result of communications problems, including the crisis caused by President Woodrow Wilson's having been incapacitated by a stroke. (Requests by the governor for federal military assistance had to go to the President's office.)

=== Tom Dennison ===
Many within Omaha saw the riot within the context of a conspiracy theory, the direct result of direction by Omaha political and criminal boss Tom Dennison. At the time, Rev. John Albert Williams, editor of a Black newspaper called The Monitor, made the clearest and most direct public allegations against Dennison. A turncoat from Dennison's machine said he had heard Boss Dennison boasting that some of the assailants were white Dennison operatives disguised in blackface.

In more recent times, according to local historian Orville D. Menard in 1989, Dennison fomented the riot in the Gibson neighborhood near South Omaha. Dennison's scheme was corroborated by police reports that one white attacker was still wearing the make-up when apprehended. As in many other Dennison-related cases, no one was ever found guilty for their participation in the riot. A later grand jury trial corroborated this claim, stating "Several reported assaults on white women had actually been perpetrated by whites in blackface." They went on to report that the riot was planned and begun by "the vice element of the city." The riot "was not a casual affair; it was premeditated and planned by those secret and invisible forces that today are fighting you and the men who represent good government."

=== Racial tension ===
The event was part of an ongoing racial tension in Omaha in the early 20th century. There were attacks on Greek immigrants in 1909. The migration of many blacks into the city pursuing economic opportunities sparked racial tension in the state. After the Omaha riot, the Ku Klux Klan became established in 1921. Another racial riot took place in North Platte, Nebraska in 1929. There were also violent strikes in the Omaha meat packing industry in 1917 and 1921 and concerns about immigrants from Southern and Eastern Europe.

After the riot, the city of Omaha, previously a city in which ethnicities and races were mixed in many neighborhoods, became more segregated. Redlining and restrictive covenants began to be used in new neighborhoods, with African Americans restricted to owning property where they already lived in greatest number, in North Omaha. Although segregation has not been legally enforced for generations, a majority of Omaha's black population still lives in North Omaha.

== Legacy ==
In the fall of 1920, Dr. George E. Haynes, an educator employed as Director of Negro Economics at the U.S. Department of Labor, produced a report on that year's racial violence designed to serve as the basis for an investigation by the U.S. Senate Committee on the Judiciary. It cataloged 26 separate riots on the part of whites attacking blacks in widely scattered communities.

Together with other riots in 1919, the Omaha riot prompted the United States Senate Committee on Judiciary in October 1919 to call for an investigation of urban, industrial and racial problems. The committee members recognized lynchings as a justified cause of bitterness in the black community, and enumerated the riots of 1919 and lynchings as among the factors for its investigation. They called for leaders of the white and black communities to work toward reconciliation. In July 1918, President Woodrow Wilson had made a speech against lynching and mob violence. Congress had considered anti-lynching legislation since George Henry White introduced H.R. 6963 on January 20, 1900. President Joe Biden signed America's first anti-lynching law in March 2022.

James Joyce, in a 1919 draft of his novel Ulysses, mentions the murder. He based his mention on an article in the London Times of September 30, 1919, which mistakenly put Omaha in Georgia.

In 1998, playwright Max Sparber had his play about the riot produced by the Blue Barn Theatre in the rotunda of the Douglas County Courthouse. The play, titled Minstrel Show; Or, The Lynching of William Brown, caused a minor controversy. State Senator Ernie Chambers condemned the play for using the device of fictional African-American blackface performers as the story's narrators. He called for a black boycott of the play. Nonetheless, the play performed to sold-out houses and later enjoyed productions in other cities.

In 2007 the New Jersey Repertory Company presented Sparber's Minstrel Show or the Lynching of William Brown in Long Branch. The cast included Kelcey Watson from Omaha and Spencer Scott Barros from New York City. Both actors had performed in previous productions of the play. It was directed by Rob Urbinati.

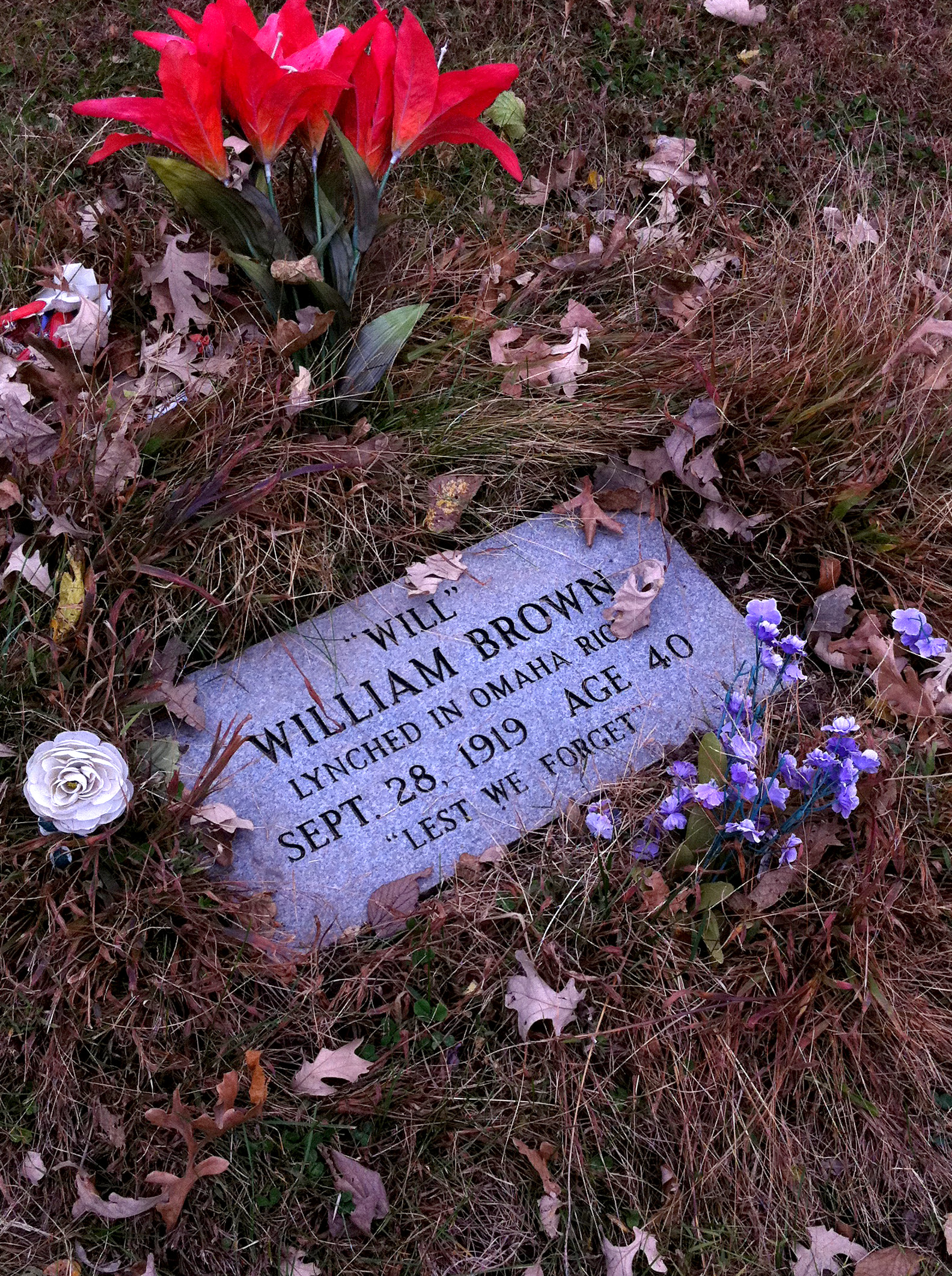
Brown's tombstone

In 2009, California engineer Chris Hebert learned about the Omaha riot and the lynching of Will Brown after viewing a TV documentary on Henry Fonda, which mentioned the actor's having been profoundly affected by the riot as a young Omaha native. Describing himself as having "tears in my eyes" after reading more on the riot and Brown's death, Hebert further discovered that Brown still lay in the unmarked grave he was buried in at Potter's Field. After consultation with staff at Omaha's Forest Lawn Memorial Park, who located the grave after a lengthy search on June 11, Hebert donated money for the placement of a permanent memorial for Brown, giving his name, date and cause of death and the motto 'Lest we forget.' In an open letter to the people of Omaha, Hebert described his feelings behind his effort:

It is a shame that it took these deaths and others to raise public consciousness and effect the changes that we enjoy today. When I discovered that William Brown was buried in a pauper's grave, I did not want William Brown to be forgotten. I wanted him to have a headstone to let people know that it was because of people like him that we enjoy our freedoms today. The lesson learned from his death should be taught to all. That is, we cannot have the protections guaranteed by the Constitution without law. There is no place for vigilantism in our society.

In 2017, the novel Kings of Broken Things was published by Little A. The novel tells a story about the situation surrounding the race riot from multiple perspectives in Omaha's immigrant communities and the criminal machine of Tom Dennison. The book, which won a Nebraska Book Award, features a detailed depiction of the riot and lynching of Will Brown.

== See also ==
- Wilmington massacre
- Crime in Omaha
- King assassination riots
- Mass racial violence in the United States
- Racial tension in Omaha, Nebraska
- Civil Rights Movement in Omaha, Nebraska
- Greek Town riot
- List of incidents of civil unrest in the United States
- False accusations of rape as justification for lynchings
- Lynching of Jesse Washington
