= Ford Hospital (Nebraska) =

- U.S. National Register of Historic Places
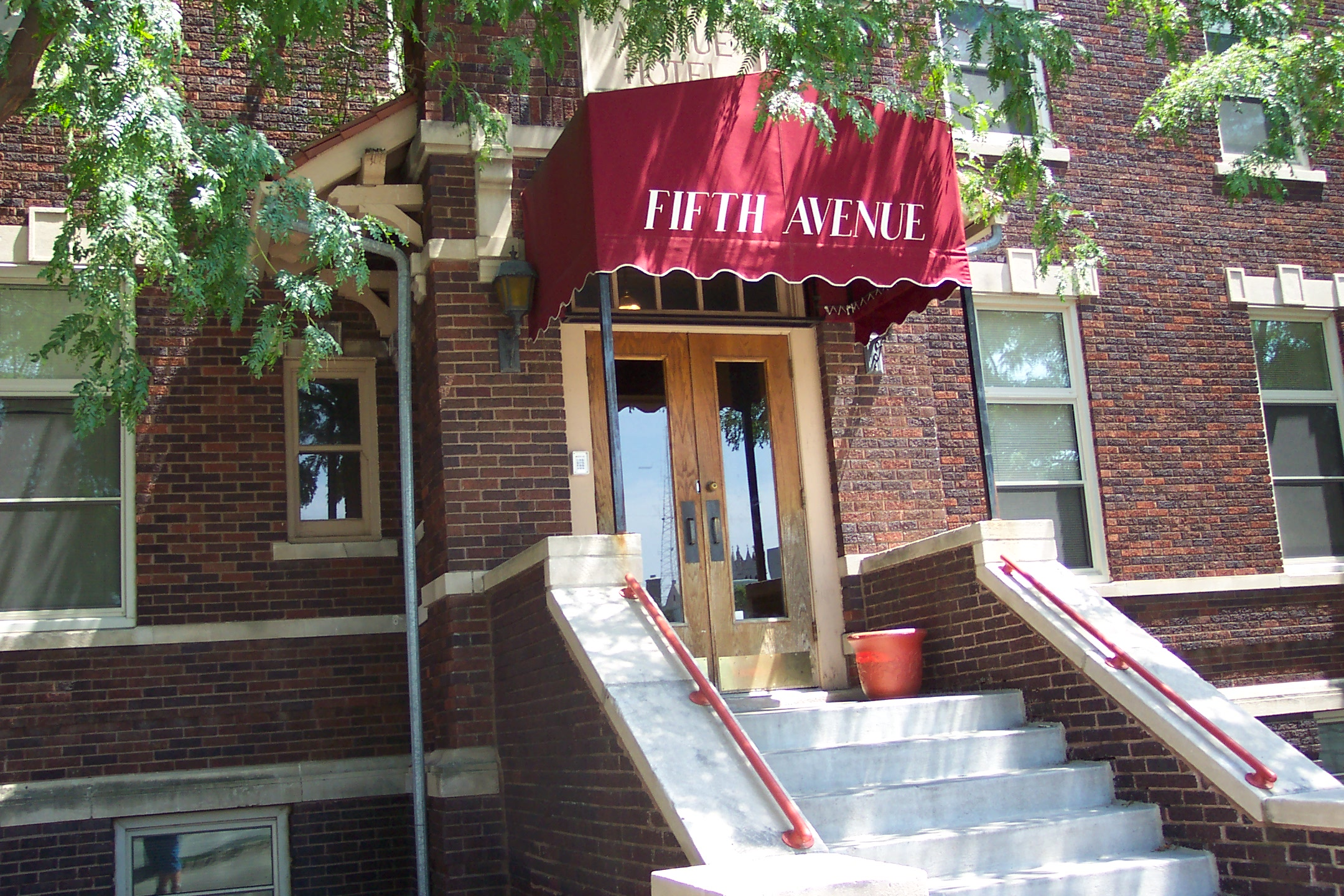
- Main entrance on 25th St

- Location within Nebraska Location within the United States
- Location: 121 South 25th Street, Omaha, Nebraska
- Coordinates: 41°15′32.37″N 95°56′51.98″W
- Built: 1916
- Architect: James T. Allan; Berak & Wind
- Architectural style: Late 19th And 20th Century Revivals
- NRHP reference No.: 86000444
- Added to NRHP: March 20, 1986

The Ford Hospital, also called the Fifth Avenue Hotel, is located in downtown Omaha, Nebraska. Built in 1916 by Home Builders Incorporated, the hospital was a privately operated facility built and operated by Dr. Michael J. Ford. Operating until 1922, it was the last small, private hospital in the city. Originally designed by James T. Allan, the building stylistically is a unique blend of elements from the Second Renaissance Revival and the Arts and Crafts movements. The building was sold and remodeled as the Fifth Avenue Hotel in 1929, a name referring to the nickname Douglas Street obtained after the installation of new electric lights in 1927. The building was again converted in 1987, and currently serves as apartments.

== Notable cases ==
The hospital was instrumental in Omaha's treatment of the "Great Influenza Epidemic" of 1919. That same year, Mayor Edward Parsons Smith was brought to the hospital on September 28, 1919. That day, he was nearly lynched by a mob during the Omaha Race Riot.

== See also ==
- List of hospitals in Omaha, Nebraska
