= Benson City Hall (Omaha, Nebraska) =

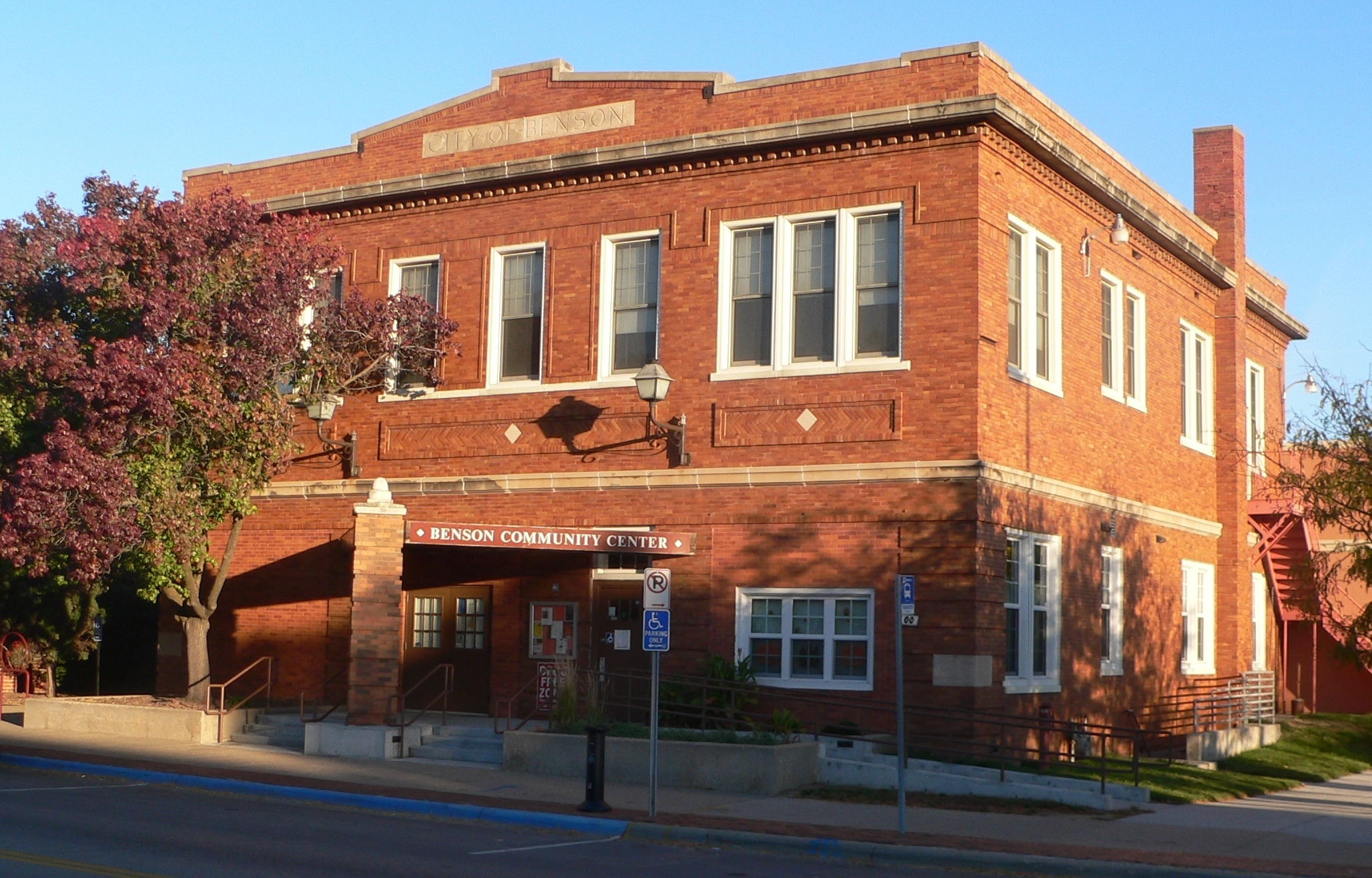
- View from the southeast
- Interactive map of the Benson City Hall area

General information
- Location: Omaha, Nebraska, United States
- Coordinates: 41.2852°N 96.005279°W
- Construction started: 1915

Design and construction
- Architect: Everett S. Dodds

The Benson City Hall and Fire Station, now known as the Benson Community Center, is located at 6008 Maple Street in the Benson neighborhood of Omaha, Nebraska. It was built in 1915, shortly before Benson's annexation by Omaha.

== History ==
The first public building in Benson was a city hall built in 1892 at Military Road and Spencer Street. In 1901, it was moved to the intersection of Military Avenue and Wirt Street, where it remained until 1916, when it was sold at auction.

In the mid-to-late 1910s, the city of Omaha began a course of annexations of suburban communities to its north and west. Benson, seeing itself as a likely target, decided to add as many civic improvements as they could before this happened. The reasons for this were twofold. First, Bensonites feared that the much larger Omaha government would be slow in responding to their desire for such improvements. Second, they knew that upon annexation, their municipal debts would be assumed by the whole city of Omaha. In May 1915, popular Omaha architect Everett S. Dodds submitted designs to the Benson City Council, and in the fall of 1915 the Council hired the Rasmussen Construction Company to erect a new combined city hall and fire station.

After Benson was annexed into Omaha in 1917, the building became a community center, and in 1923 the second floor was designated for use by the Omaha Public Library system as the Benson branch. After a new library was constructed in 1941, the building continued to house the Benson Community Center.

== See also ==
- History of Omaha, Nebraska
