= Erastus Benson =

American banker, investor and land speculator

- Born: Erastus A. Benson; February 10, 1854; Omaha, Nebraska, United States
- Died: 1932 (aged 77–78)
- Education: University of Iowa
- Occupations: Banker, investor, land speculator

Erastus A. Benson (February 10, 1854 – 1932) was a banker, investor and land speculator in Omaha, Nebraska. Born and raised in Iowa, after graduating from the University of Iowa Benson speculated in land around Omaha. After investing in early business ventures in the phonograph and the Kinetoscope, Benson staged an unsuccessful bid to become the Mayor of Omaha. In addition to being one of the inaugural members of the influential National Phonograph Association, the former town of Benson, Nebraska, was named after him.

== Biography ==
=== Early life and education ===
Erastus Benson was born February 10, 1854, in Iowa.

Benson completed his schooling in Iowa. He later attended both Wesleyan College and the University of Iowa.

=== Land speculation ===
After moving to Omaha 1886, he acquired a number of properties in and around Omaha. Throughout his life, Benson was a respected member of the business community in Omaha, with memberships in the Omaha Chamber of Commerce and the Real Estate Exchange.

Through a company he owned called the Omaha Abstract and Trust Company, Benson accumulated a great deal of land around Omaha. In 1887 Erastus Benson purchased approximately 900 acres (3.6 km^{2}) of farm land approximately nine miles northwest of Omaha from John Creighton, an important businessman and philanthropist in the city. Benson Place, a suburb of Omaha, was platted on March 4, 1887. Benson's application to run a streetcar line connecting the suburb with Omaha was approved the same day. Benson attracted buyers by hiring Charles Jesse "Buffalo" Jones to graze herds of buffalo along Military Road.

=== Investments and politics ===
In the late 1890s, Benson was a central figure in the founding the first of the regional companies associated with the North American Phonograph Company called the Chicago Central Phonograph Company, along with Alfred O. Tate and Thomas Lombard. He later began the Nebraska Phonograph Company, and was president of that company. As president of the company Benson had an exclusive deal with Edison, leading the company to dominate phonograph sales throughout the Midwest for several years. In that capacity he also discovered the young Leon Douglass, who was a self-educated boy telephone operator who at the age of 21 invented one of the first workable patents for a coin-operated phonograph. Douglas sold the patent to Benson.

After Thomas Edison finished his Kinetoscope, he marketed the device and his films through the independently owned Kinetoscope Company. Erastus Benson, along with Alfred O. Tate, Thomas Lombard, Norman C. Raff, Frank R. Gammon, and Andrew Holland.

In 1906 Benson ran on the Republican Party ticket to reform Omaha's reputation "open town" where anything goes. Criminal elements in the city, led by Tom Dennison, sought to defeat Benson. Their candidate, "Cowboy Jim" Dahlman, eventually won the election, and eight others thereafter. Benson never ran for public office in Omaha again.

=== Philanthropy and interests ===
While developing Benson Place, Erastus donated land in town for the construction of a schoolhouse, a town hall where church services and community events were held, and for an orphanage.

After the outbreak of World War I and increased hostilities by the Turkish against Armenians, Syrians and Greeks, Benson became instrumental in answering President Woodrow Wilson's call for assistance from Americans for the affected people. Benson became the vice-president of the Nebraska branch of the American Committee for Armenian-Syrian Relief, which was headquartered in Omaha.

Benson also has a number of original recordings included in the Edison Sheet Music Collection of the Music Division of the United States Library of Congress. He has approximately twenty songs included that were recorded between 1866 and 1878.

== See also ==
- History of Omaha
- Founding figures of Omaha, Nebraska
