= James Dahlman =

American mayor

James Charles Dahlman
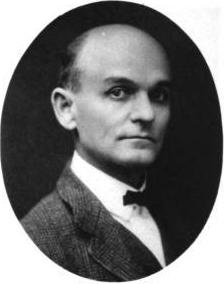

Mayor of Omaha
- In office 1906–1918
- Preceded by: Harry B. Zimman
- Succeeded by: Edward Parsons Smith
- In office 1921–1930
- Preceded by: Edward Parsons Smith
- Succeeded by: John H. Hopkins

Personal details
- Born: 15 December 1856 DeWitt County, Texas
- Died: 21 January 1930 (aged 73) Omaha, Nebraska
- Party: Democratic
- Spouse: Hattie Abbott Dahlman
- Children: Ruth Baughman, Dorothy Dahlman
- Occupation: Politician
- Profession: Cattle industry

James Charles Dahlman (December 15, 1856 – January 21, 1930), also known as Jim Dahlman, Cowboy Jim and Mayor Jim, was elected to eight terms as mayor of Omaha, Nebraska, serving the city for 20 years over a 23-year-period. A German-American and an agnostic, Dahlman grew up in a ranching area and started working as a Texas cowboy. He was elected as a county sheriff and small town mayor in western Nebraska before moving to Omaha.

Called the "perpetual Mayor" in Omaha, Dahlman was seen by many as a cover man for the city's vice elements. Earning the reputation as the "wettest mayor in America", Dahlman saw the number of saloons in Omaha double during his first 10 years as mayor. The term "Dahlmanism" was coined to describe his politics.

== Background ==
James Charles Dahlman was born in Yorktown, DeWitt County, Texas, in 1856. He was the eldest son of Charles and Mary Dahlman, both German Americans. At age 17, he won a Texas state riding competition and became a cowhand shortly afterwards. He was known as an expert with the lariat. In 1878, at the age of 22, Dahlman killed his brother-in-law during an argument and fled to western Nebraska, where he used the name "Jim Murray". Dahlman later learned a judge ruled the killing was self-defense. After working as a cowpuncher at the N-Bar Newman Ranch near Gordon for several years, Dahlman became a range boss.

In late 1884, Dahlman married Hattie Abbott who was a student at Wellesley College. Her father, Charles Abbott, was a doctor in Maine and Hattie met Dahlman at the Pine Ridge Indian Reservation where he was working at the time.

== Early political career ==
Later Dahlman became a brand inspector for the Wyoming Stock Association at Valentine. Soon he was elected sheriff of Dawes County. In 1885 he became the mayor of Chadron and was elected twice to that office.

While mayor of Chadron, Dahlman formed a friendship with a successful young lawyer from Lincoln named William Jennings Bryan. For the next several years, the pair maintained contact, with Dahlman raising funds in Chadron for Bryan's 1892 campaign for re-election to Congress. Dahlman served twice as a Nebraska delegate to the Democratic National Convention, in 1892 and 1896.

After declining an offer as the police chief in Omaha in 1896, Dahlman served as Democratic state chairman. He helped Bryan to carry Nebraska in his first run for President of the United States that year.

In 1899 Dahlman was hired by the Union Stock Yards Company of Omaha.

== Mayor of Omaha ==
Dahlman was elected in 1906 to serve as Omaha mayor, the first of three elections in a row which he won. He became a close ally of Tom Dennison, who reportedly supported his first campaign because Dahlman was "tolerant" of Dennison's Sporting District in downtown Omaha. In 1908 the Nebraska Legislature passed a law that required saloons to be open only during daylight hours. Mayor Dahlman led the opposition in Omaha, where he openly flaunted his defiance in a variety of establishments throughout the city. In his first term Dahlman ensured Dennison's political standing within the city. However, running on an anti-Prohibition ticket, Dahlman quickly lost support of Bryan, who deeply supported Prohibition.

Dahlman has been noted for his early concern for the city's citizens, particularly calling for prudence during Thanksgiving Day meals. He was also condemned for his "loose" attitudes towards Omaha's vice elements. Religious leaders throughout the city started referring to "Dahlmanism", which according to the daily Omaha Bee, "exposes the most sacred interests of morality and public order. Its concealed friendliness to the elements of vice and crime renders Dahlmanism a menace to public morals."

== Governor's race ==
Dahlman lost a race for Governor of Nebraska against Chester H. Aldrich in 1910. Running on anti-Prohibition and local control for cities, Dahlman lost to Aldrich's promises of progressive reform. Dahlman also hinted at moving the Nebraska State Capitol from Lincoln to Omaha. However, Germans in Omaha and the National German-American Alliance supported Dahlman by providing him with 70% of their vote that year. In what was called the "Dahlman element", the mayor gained a great deal of support from breweries across the state, but failed to significantly challenge Aldrich.

After serving as a United States Marshal in 1920, he resigned in 1921 to become mayor of Omaha for the fifth time, and was mayor for three more terms afterwards.

== Policy-making ==
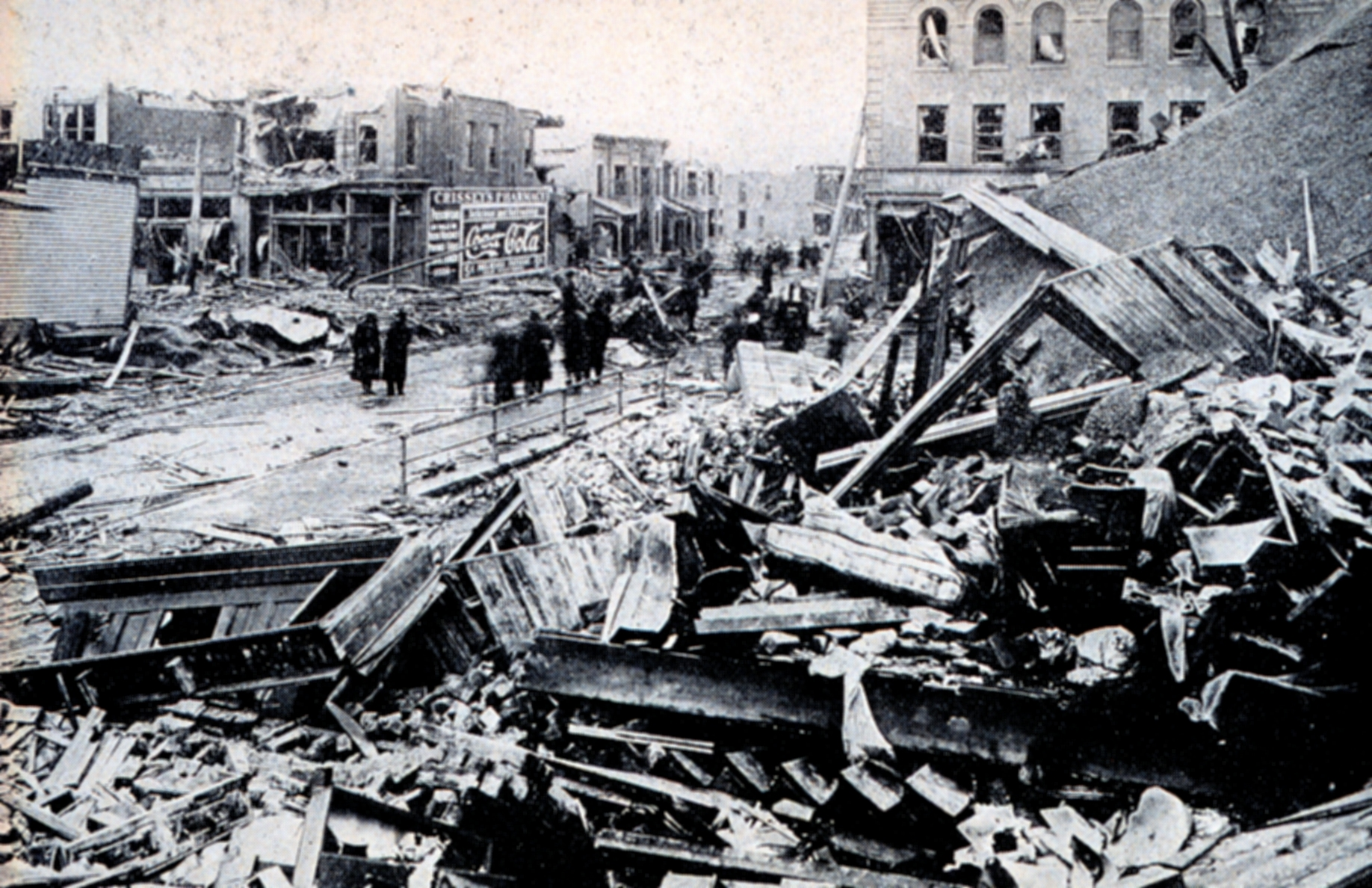
Photograph of tornado damage from the Omaha Easter Sunday Tornado of 1913.

Under Dahlman, Omaha claimed its "strong city" status for the first time. Before him, the city had to get permission from the state legislature to give a policeman a raise. Dahlman led the battle to gain the city's autonomy and was accused of wanting to "secede" Omaha from the state of Nebraska. State legislators scoffed at Omaha's ability to control her own affairs.

When a constitutional amendment was submitted to the voters, however, they approved giving Omaha government more authority. Other major accomplishments of Dahlman's mayorship included the city's purchase of the Florence Waterworks, the gas company and formation of the Metropolitan Utilities District in 1921.

Dahlman was lambasted for his response to the disastrous Omaha Easter Sunday Tornado of 1913, when he refused federal aid and contributions from people across the country. The city suffered more than 100 related deaths, and millions of dollars in property damage in a swath of destruction for miles through the city.

== Civic involvement ==
Dahlman was a member of several social and philanthropic organizations, including the Omaha Community Chest, the Omaha Chamber of Commerce, the Young Men's Christian Association, the Omaha Library Commission, the Fraternal Aid Union, the Royal Arcanum, the Woodmen of the World, the Ancient Order of United Workmen, the Moose and the Elks. He was president of the Americanization League.

=== Omaha Race Riot of 1919 ===
After keeping the mayorship for three terms in a row, Dahlman lost the 1918 election to Edward P. Smith, a reformist Democrat who was supported by the powerful Omaha Church Federation and the Douglas County Dry League. Smith focused his slate on making Omaha a dry city, cleaning up the "vice" elements of the city, and securing a positive future for the city's businesses. Smith and the city commission that shared his reformist objectives were the bane of Tom Dennison.

Later a grand jury found suggested that the "vice element" or Dennison's men, had assaulted women while in blackface, to raise racial tensions in the city. Postwar social issues, as in other industrial cities, were brewing, as groups competed for space and jobs. Blacks were recruited by the meatpacking industry as strikebreakers, which increased hostility of white ethnics toward them. Their numbers increased dramatically in Omaha between 1910 and 1920; it was the only place in the state where many blacks lived. Ethnic Irish were involved in an earlier riot in Greektown, resulting in attacks, burning of buildings and Greeks' leaving Omaha.

In September 1919 an African American named Willy Brown was accused of rape and taken to the county courthouse for protection. A mob of white men from South Omaha, who were mostly of white ethnic immigrant descent, marched to the Douglas County Courthouse and ended up lynching Brown, after attacking and burning the courthouse. While there were reports that the violence was led by a variety of men, one of Dennison's henchman was seen urging on the mob. Dennison quickly got him out of town after the riot. Contemporary historians believe that Dennison, acting on behalf of Dahlman, contributed to the poisonous atmosphere in the city, if not to the specific event.

The report of the grand jury trial, initiated two weeks after the riot, stated the riot "was not a casual affair; it was premeditated and planned by those secret and invisible forces that today are fighting you and the men who represent good government."

Because of the riot, Smith never could recover his political career. He had barely survived being lynched himself. He hired 100 more police officers for the city, but could recover no political momentum. He refused to take any action with the city commission. In 1921 Dahlman and his ticket were re-elected into control of the city.

== Death ==
Dahlman died in office January 21, 1930.

== Legacy ==
After his death, the Dahlman neighborhood, Dahlman School, Dahlman Park and Dahlman Avenue in Omaha were named in his honor.

In 1964, Dahlman was inducted into the Hall of Great Westerners, cited as "the Cowboy Mayor of Omaha, cattleman and Sheriff of Dawes County."

His two grandsons went to the U.S. Naval Academy. The USS Collett (DD-730) was named for the eldest grandson, John A. Collett, and the first commanding officer was the other grandson, James Dahlman Collett.

In 1964, he was inducted into the Hall of Great Westerners of the National Cowboy & Western Heritage Museum.

== Popular culture ==
Jim Dahlman makes an appearance in the historical novel Kings of Broken Things by Theodore Wheeler that is set in Omaha during the era of Tom Dennison's control. The novel depicts the Omaha Race Riot of 1919 and an attempt to fix the municipal election of 1918 when Dahlman lost his re-election bid.

== Political timeline ==
James Dahlman was a lifelong Democrat who served in the following positions:

James Dahlman's political timeline
Title	Place	Dates
Sheriff	Dawes County, Nebraska	1888–1894
Mayor	Chadron, Nebraska	1894–1895
Delegate from Nebraska	Democratic National Convention	1892 and 1928
State chair	Nebraska Democratic Party	1896–1900
Member	Democratic National Committee from Nebraska	1900–1908
Candidate, Governor of Nebraska		1910
United States Marshall		1920-1921
Mayor	Omaha	1906–1910, 1910–1918, 1921–1930

Political offices
Preceded by Harry B. Zimman	Mayor of Omaha; 1906 – 1918	Succeeded by Edward Parsons Smith
Preceded by Edward Parsons Smith	Mayor of Omaha; 1921 – 1930	Succeeded by John H. Hopkins (acting)

== See also ==
- History of Omaha
- List of mayors of Omaha, Nebraska

== Bibliography ==
- (1927) "Sketches of American mayors," National Municipal Review. 16(2). p 111–117.

Party political offices
Preceded by Ashton C. Shallenberger	Democratic nominee for Governor of Nebraska; 1910	Succeeded by John H. Morehead
