= Benson, Nebraska =

Neighborhood in Omaha, Nebraska, U.S.

Benson
- Neighborhood
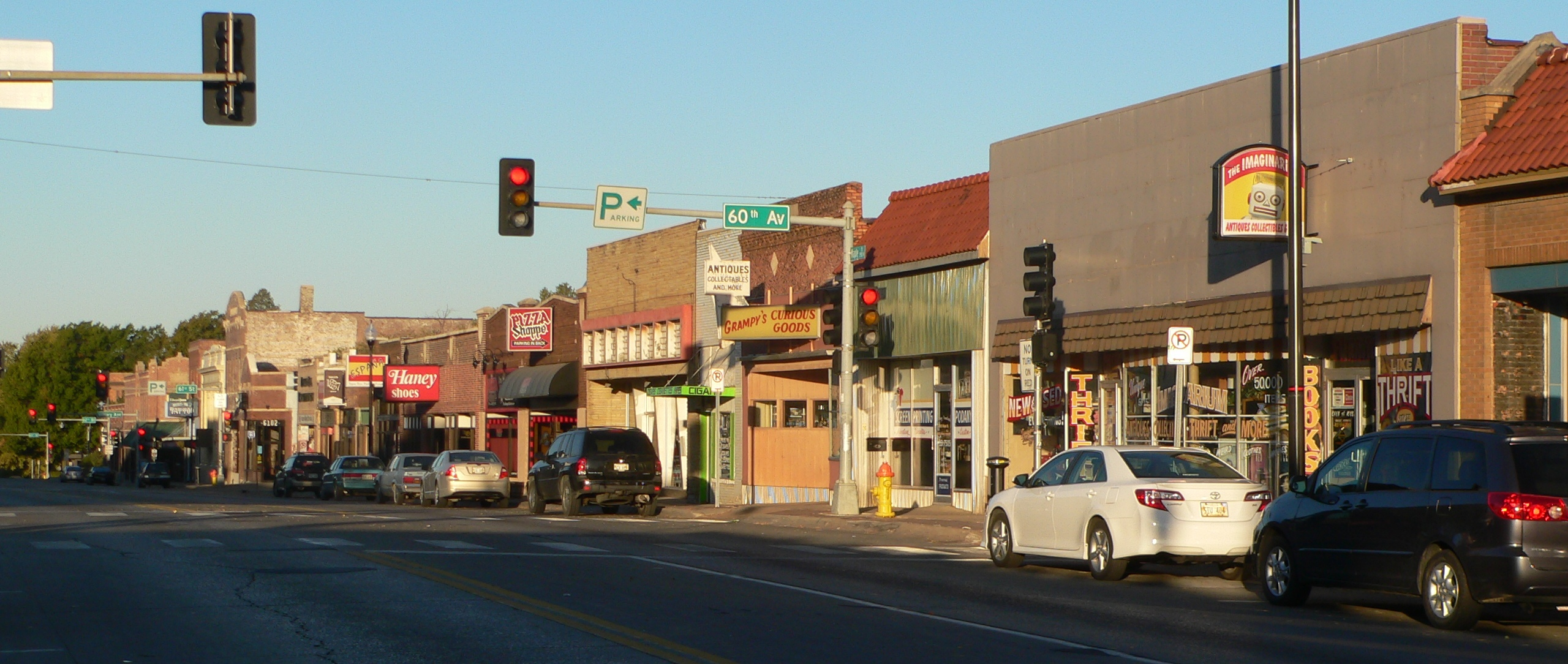
- Downtown Benson on North 60th Avenue Maple Street
- Interactive map of Benson
- Coordinates: 41°17′N 96°00′W
- Country: United States
- Established: 1887

Area
  - Total: 2.14 sq mi (5.55 km^{2})
  - Land: 2.14 sq mi (5.55 km^{2})
  - Water: 0 sq mi (0 km^{2})

Population (2010)
  - Total: 9,137
  - Density: 4,260/sq mi (1,650/km^{2})
- Website: www.downtownbenson.com

Benson is a historic neighborhood in North Omaha in Omaha, Nebraska, originally platted in 1887 and annexed to the City of Omaha in 1917.

== History ==
Erastus Benson was a land speculator, investor and philanthropist who unsuccessfully ran for Mayor of Omaha in 1906. He was an early investor in marketing Thomas Edison's inventions, including the phonograph and the Kinetoscope. In 1887, he purchased approximately 900 acres (3.6 km^{2}) of farm land from Edward Creighton, an Omaha businessman. On March 4, 1887, Benson platted the land on the Creighton farm and called it Benson Place, later changing it to Benson. The newly platted community was located along Military Avenue, approximately 9 miles (14 km) northwest of Omaha.

In the mid-to-late 1910s, Omaha embarked on a course of annexations of suburban communities to its north and west. Residents of Benson, anticipating annexation of their own city, decided to build as many civic improvements as they could: they feared that Omaha would be inattentive to their desire for such improvements after annexation, and they knew that following annexation, the larger city would have to assume the debts incurred to build the improvements. To this end, they built a new combined city hall and fire station in late 1915.

On May 25, 1917, the city of Omaha, Nebraska annexed the town of Benson. At that time, it was 1.4 mi^{2} (3.6 km^{2}) and had 5000 residents.

Krug Park was an amusement park located at 2936 North 52nd Street in Benson. In 1930 the park was the site of the worst roller coaster accident in the country to that year.

== Historic district ==
- Benson Commercial Historic District
- U.S. National Register of Historic Places
- U.S. Historic district
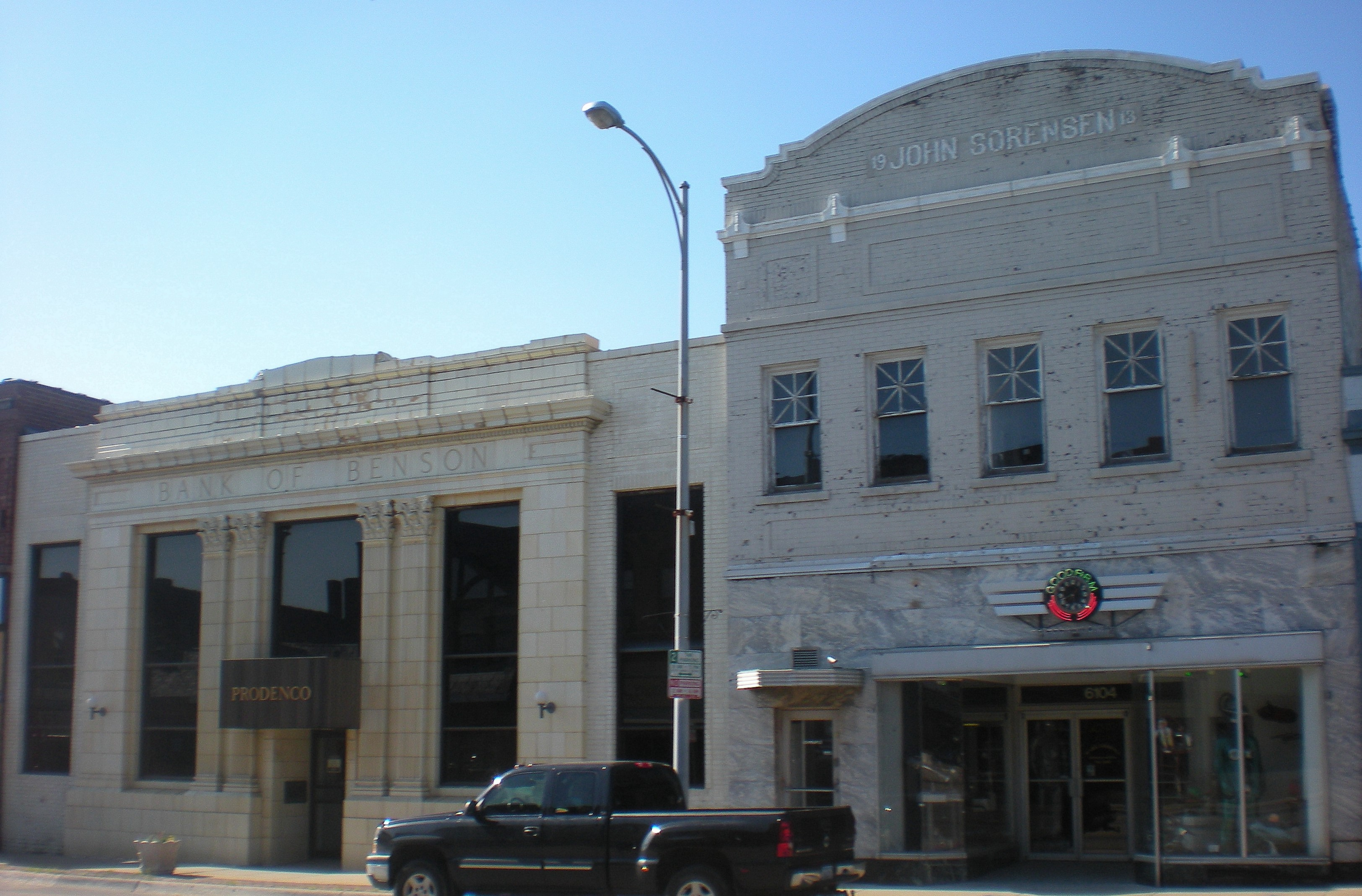
- Bank of Benson and John Sorenson Building

- Location within Nebraska
- Location: Centered along Maple St. between North 59th and North 63rd Sts., Benson, in Omaha, Nebraska
- Coordinates: 41.2850°N 96.0072°W
- Area: 13.2 acres (5.3 ha)
- NRHP reference No.: 100005766
- Added to NRHP: November 13, 2020

The Benson Commercial Historic District, centered along Maple St. between North 59th and North 63rd Sts., was listed on the U.S. National Register of Historic Places in 2020.

It includes numerous contributing buildings.

Benson has many historic buildings, including commercial, governmental, educational and residential structures. The following, many within the historic district, are some of them:

- Benson High School, 5120 Maple Street
- Masonic Temple, 5901 Maple Street, 1926-built, three-story Classical Revival building
- Commercial Building, 5913 Maple Street
- E.H. Olson Building, 5918 Maple Street
- Commercial Building, 6016 Maple Street
- Commercial Building, 6020 Maple Street
- Commercial Building, 6067 Maple Street
- John Sorenson Building, 6104 Maple Street
- Jas. A. Howard Building, 6105 Maple Street
- Bank of Benson, 6108 Maple Street
- Commercial Building, 6115 Maple Street
- Commercial Building, 6117 Maple Street
- B.H. Post Building, 6214 Maple Street
- Benson U.S. Post Office, 6223 Maple Street
