= Douglas County Poor Farm =

Coordinates: 41.245°N 95.975°W

The Douglas County Poor Farm was located in the present-day boundaries of Omaha, Nebraska, which lies within Douglas County. Founded in 1859, the farm encompassed 160 acres and was intended for the "paupers" in the area.

== History ==
=== Early years ===
Early in 1859 the Douglas County Board of Commissioners decided to establish a poor farm. On March 1, 1859, Douglas County purchased land as the poor farm. It was apparently located along St. Mary's Avenue originally. The purchase of the land led to a more than twenty-year-long litigation by the landowner and his heirs to force the county to pay. It was only resolved by the Supreme Court of the United States of America, and the county finished paying off the land in July, 1886.

According to an original history of Nebraska from the 1900s, inmates at the poor farm were "limited in their accommodations to ill furnished rooms in an old and dilapidated shanty, where they were huddled together in a manner devoid of comfort."

=== Second building ===
Jonas Gise, senior Douglas County Commissioner, led a campaign to build substantial structure starting in June 1869. By December the new building was opened, and was called the Hascall House. It was a brick building, two stories high, forty by thirty-six feet, with a capacity sufficient to accommodate forty regular inmates, and fifty in case of emergency. It was built for $8,474. The institution housed thirty-six inmates, a portion of whom are insane patients under the care of I. N. Pierce, superintendent. The Douglas County Poor Farm was appropriated $3,500 annually from the county, in addition to money earned from the farm's production.

=== Third building ===
The Hascall House was deemed too small by county commissioners in the 1880s, and in 1886 they began a preliminary process to build the Douglas County Hospital. The establishment of the Omaha Stock Yards and the platting of South Omaha made the land where the poor farm was located desirable for developers. A boom in real estate in the vicinity led commissioners to the idea of platting the east fifty acres of the poor farm and selling the lots to raise the necessary funds for the new county hospital. The commissioners adopted a resolution stating, "the proceeds arising from the sale of said lots shall be appropriated to the erection of a suitable building for the care and protection of the county poor and insane." $330,480 was raised, and $133,000 was spent on constructing the hospital. Shoddy workmanship led to a large portion of this building falling apart within months of opening, and forcing the county to rebuild it at a significant cost. Another court case ensued when the county refused to pay the full amount of the original contractor's bill due to the workmanship issues. It also went to the Nebraska Supreme Court, and the county was eventually forced to pay.

In another trial that went to the Supreme Court of Nebraska, the City of Omaha and Douglas County were forced to issue bonds to pay claims against the sale of the land. The county did not process the sales of lots in what was called the "Douglas Addition" correctly, and the landowners were awarded fees and legal costs.

=== Fourth building ===
In early 1926, a public health campaign led by the Omaha-Douglas County Medical Society focused on creating a poor farm separate from the Douglas County Hospital. By this time the poor farm was the located next to the Field Club, and golfers were using its grounds for games. A bill was sent to the state legislature, but was defeated by a Representative Miskovsky of Omaha, told critics of the institution, "conditions there... were not so bad, in fact, the Douglas County poor farm... was just as good as any in the middle west, if not better. I know the conditions better than anyone else in this house, too." The physicians' association succeeded in getting a city bond passed that paid for a new facility.

During this period the farm was located next to the Omaha Belt Line, a railway that circulated through the city. There were also brick yards located on the grounds.

=== Current times ===
A sign on the wall on the first floor of the present-day Douglas County Health Center reads, in part, "Original site of the first Douglas County Tuberculosis Hospital, Poor Farm, and Pest House." There are no other acknowledgments of its existence in Omaha, including historical tours, markers, articles or otherwise.

== See also ==
- Potter's Field (Omaha, Nebraska)
- History of Omaha, Nebraska
