= Edward Parsons Smith =

Mayor of Omaha, Nebraska

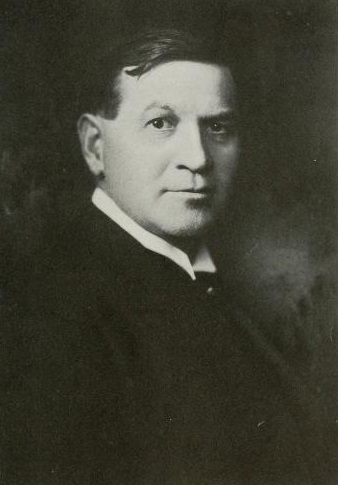
- From Volume 2 (1917) of Omaha: The Gate City, and Douglas County, Nebraska

32nd Mayor of Omaha
- In office 1918–1921
- Preceded by: James C. Dahlman
- Succeeded by: James C. Dahlman

Personal details
- Born: September 30, 1860 Mount Pleasant, Iowa
- Died: May 21, 1930 (aged 69) Omaha, Nebraska
- Resting place: Forest Lawn Memorial Park, Omaha, Nebraska
- Party: Democratic
- Spouse: Margaret Wertman (m. 1883)
- Children: 3
- Education: University of Iowa College of Law
- Profession: Attorney

Edward Parsons Smith (September 30, 1860 – May 21, 1930) was the mayor of Omaha, Nebraska, from 1918 to 1921.

== Biography ==
Smith was born in Mount Pleasant, Iowa, on September 30, 1860, and was a son of Edward Smith and Celia (Schockley) Smith. He attended the local schools and graduated from Mount Pleasant's Howe's Academy. He graduated from the University of Iowa College of Law with an LL.B. degree in 1885, and was admitted to the bar. Smith relocated to Seward, Nebraska, in the summer of 1885, and established a law practice that specialized in interstate commerce. He moved to Omaha in 1890 and continued to practice law.

In addition to his law practice, Smith was active in several businesses. He was the attorney for the Omaha Grain Exchange, of which he was also a board of directors member. In addition, Smith was vice president of the Omaha Cooperage Company, and served on its board of directors.

== Mayor of Omaha ==
A Democrat, Smith ran for mayor in 1918 and beat incumbent Mayor "Cowboy" Jim Dahlman on a reform ticket aiming to defeat Tom Dennison's political machine, which at that point had run Omaha for at least 15 years. Dennison's displeasure with Smith's morality stance was frequently voiced, and took shape in the Omaha Race Riot of 1919. During that riot, Smith was strung up and almost lynched by a mob. After being rescued by Omaha Police detectives, he was taken to Omaha's Ford Hospital.

== Death and burial ==
He died in Omaha on May 21, 1930, and was buried in Section 23, Lot 186 of Forest Lawn Memorial Park in Omaha.

== Family ==
In November 1883, Smith married Margaret Wertman of Greenfield, Iowa. They were the parents of Ida B. Smith, Lisle W. Smith, and Edward Esher Smith.

== See also ==
- History of Omaha

Political offices
Preceded by James C. Dahlman	Mayor of Omaha; 1918–1921	Succeeded by James C. Dahlman
