= Douglas County Courthouse (Nebraska) =

Courthouse in Omaha, Nebraska, U.S.

Coordinates: 41°15′25″N 95°56′21″W

- U.S. National Register of Historic Places
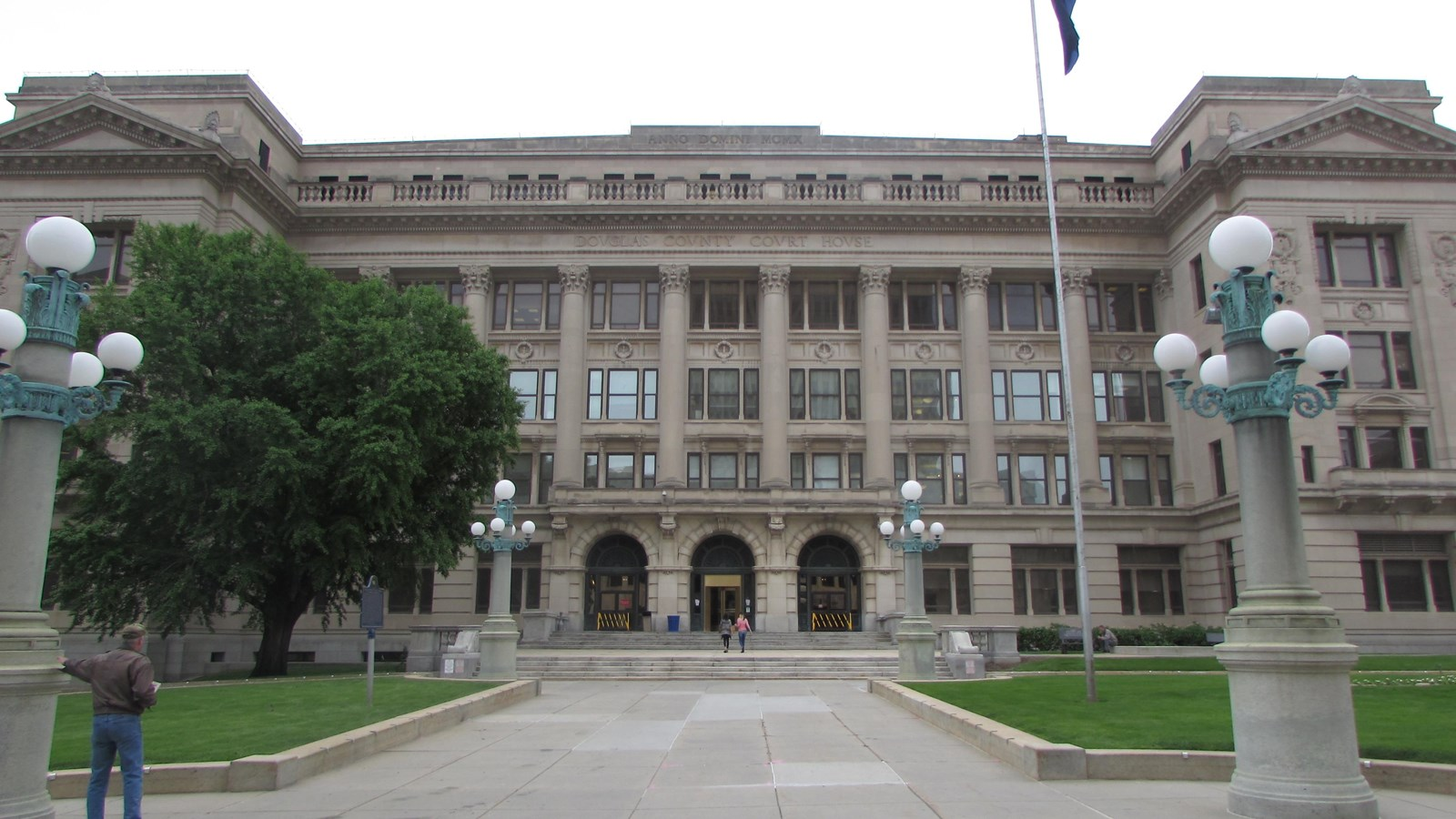
- Douglas County Courthouse in 2009
- Interactive map showing the location of Douglas County Courthouse
- Location: Omaha, Nebraska
- Built: 1912
- Architect: John Latenser, Sr.
- Architectural style: French Renaissance Revival
- NRHP reference No.: 79003683
- Added to NRHP: October 11, 1979

The Douglas County Courthouse is a county courthouse located at 1701 Farnam Street in Omaha, Nebraska, United States. Built in 1912, it was added to the National Register of Historic Places in 1979. Notable events at the courthouse include two lynchings and the city's first sit-in during the Civil Rights Movement. Five years after it was opened, the building was almost destroyed by mob violence in the Omaha Race Riot of 1919. The 1912 building was designed in the French Renaissance Revival style by local architect John Latenser, Sr. Decorative stonework covers the structure's exterior, and the building serves as a prominent landmark in Downtown Omaha.

== History ==
=== First courthouse ===
Three years after the city was founded in 1854, on March 18, 1857 the City of Omaha built a jail and courthouse in an area known as Washington Square. It bounded by 15th, 16th, Douglas and Farnam streets. The original courthouse in Douglas County, with a council room and mayor's court room, several offices and jail cells, was opened January 4, 1858.

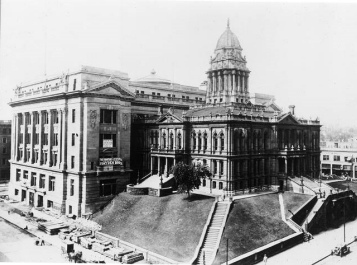
The second Douglas County Courthouse in front of the third and current courthouse in 1912

=== Second courthouse ===
The original building was found to be too small as early as 1869. The current site, a block between 17th, 18th, Farnam and Harney Streets, became available in 1878, and in 1879, a jail was built on the southwest corner of this lot. A completely new courthouse was opened on May 28, 1885.

A 112 x 130-foot (40 m)-wide building, outer walls were covered with sandstone and the inner walls were brick. The dome was iron and sheet metal that was sanded and painted to resemble stone, and was crowned by a 10-foot (3.0 m) statue of Justice. Yule Marble tiled hallways and elaborate wrought iron staircases went throughout the building.

The lynching of Joe Coe occurred outside the Courthouse in 1891. Angered because of believing that a young girl had died after being attacked by him (the girl had not died, and the allegation was never proven), hundreds of men had overwhelmed the small police force. They dragged Coe from his cell and hanged him from streetcar cables at the corner of 17th and Harney.

When the new courthouse was built, the old building was torn down and recycled. Materials from the old courthouse building were used in the construction of the Lancaster Apartments at 25th Avenue and Marcy Street. The dark stone on the lower two stories and the white pillars at each of the main entrances were from the courthouse, as well as possibly some of the stones in the courtyard wall along the alley.

=== Present courthouse ===
John Latenser, a locally important architect, was hired to design a replacement building in 1908. It opened October 1, 1912. Built south of the old courthouse, the new building is six stories tall along Harney Street and five stories along Farnam. While the exterior walls are covered with unembellished Bedford stone, the interior halls have mosaic floors and marble wainscotings. Hardwood covers the interior of most offices, and vaults preserve county records.

There were county offices on the main floor, second and third floors, and courtrooms on the fourth floor. The Douglas County Jail was on the fifth floor.

==== 1919 Riots ====
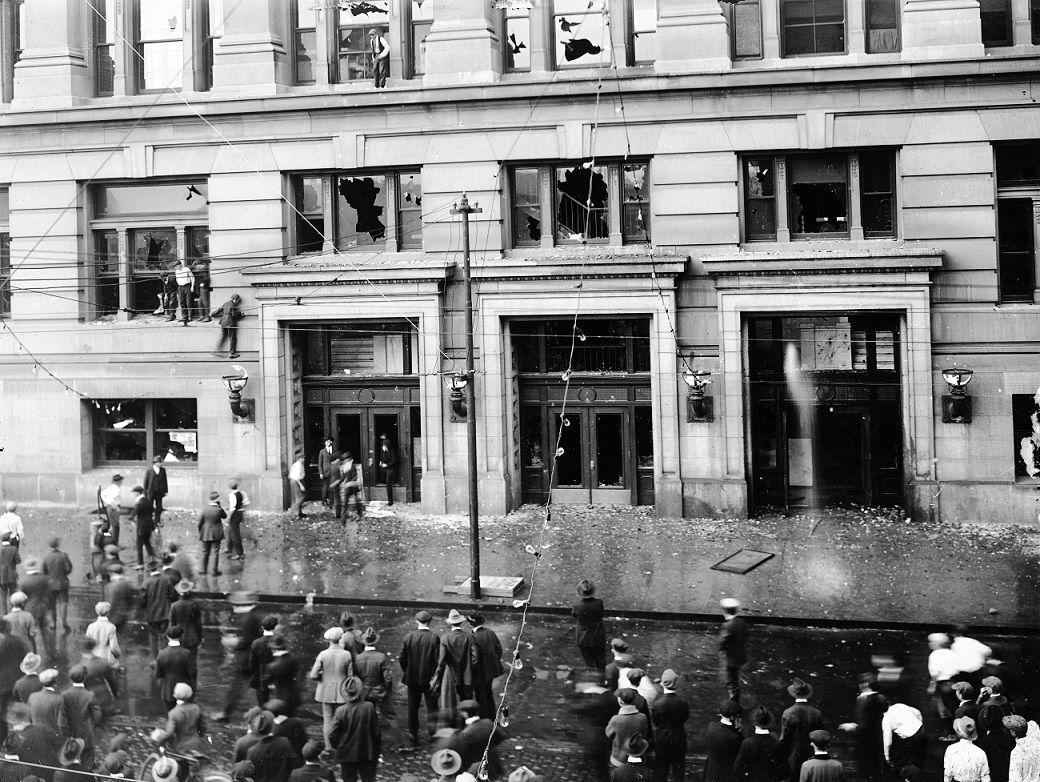
Rioters breaking windows and climbing the courthouse during the Race Riot of 1919

In September 1919, following Red Summer and race riots in numerous industrial cities, a mob of thousands of white men from South Omaha surrounded and attacked the Courthouse seeking to lynch an African-American worker named Willy Brown (accused of assaulting a white woman). Young white men broke windows and climbed the outside of the building. After a few hours, thousands more gathered and they set the courthouse on fire to force the police to hand over the suspect.

After lynching Brown and the city's mayor, Edward Parsons Smith—who was rescued at the last minute—the mob swarmed toward the city's black quarter. They were stopped by federal troops from Fort Omaha, who had been called in to restore order in the city. The military commander posted troops in South Omaha to prevent other mobs from forming.

==== Sit-ins ====
In 1948, Rev. John P. Markoe, S.J., led an early civil rights effort with an interracial group of about 30 people from Creighton University to hold the city's first sit-in at old Dixon's Cafe next to the courthouse. When the group arrived, the owner told them that white customers would stop coming into the restaurant if blacks were served. In response, the members stayed until the owner agreed to allow African-American patrons.

== See also ==
- History of Omaha
- Yule marble
