= Paxton (name) =

Paxton is both a surname and a given name. Notable people with the name include:

== Surname ==
- Bill Paxton (1955–2017), American actor
- Brady Paxton (1947–2024), American politician from West Virginia
- Elisha F. Paxton (1828–1863), American Civil War general in the Confederate army
- Elizabeth Okie Paxton (1878–1972), American painter
- Floyd Paxton (1918–1975), American inventor and businessman
- Gary S. Paxton (1939–2016), American musician and record producer
- Geoffrey Paxton, Australian Anglican minister
- George Paxton (c. 1914–1989) American bandleader, composer, and arranger
- J. F. Paxton (1857–1936), Canadian ice hockey administrator
- James Paxton (disambiguation)
  - James Paxton (actor) (born 1994), American actor
  - James Paxton (baseball) (born 1988), Canadian baseball pitcher
  - James E. Paxton (born 1963), American politician
- Jerron "Blind Boy" Paxton (born 1989), American blues musician and singer
- John Paxton (disambiguation)
  - John Paxton (1911–1985), American screenwriter
  - John Paxton (footballer) (1890–?), English footballer
  - John M. Paxton, Jr. (born 1951), United States Marine Corps lieutenant general
- Sir Joseph Paxton (1803–1865), English architect and botanist, designed the Crystal Palace for the Great Exhibition of 1851
- Ken Paxton (born 1962), American lawyer and politician, Attorney General of Texas
- Lloyd Paxton, British airline CEO
- Lonie Paxton (born 1978), American NFL pro football player
- Michael Paxton (born 1957), American filmmaker
- Mike Paxton (born 1953), American MLB pro baseball player
- Richard Paxton (1956–2006), English architect
- Robert Paxton (born 1932), American historian
- Sara Paxton (born 1988), American actress, musician
- Steve Paxton (born 1939), American experimental dancer and choreographer
- Thomas Paxton (disambiguation)
  - Thomas Paxton (1820–1887), Ontario businessman and politician
  - Sir Thomas Paxton, 1st Baronet (1860–1930), Lord Provost of Glasgow from 1920 to 1923
  - Thomas Paxton (1754–1804), captain of HMS Speedy (1798), lost in Lake Ontario
  - Tom Paxton (born 1937), American folk musician, singer-songwriter
- William Paxton (disambiguation)
  - William Paxton (1745–1824), London merchant and banker; see Paxton's Tower
  - William Paxton (Australian businessman) (1818–1893), Englishman who made a fortune in South Australia
  - William McGregor Paxton (1869–1941), American artist

== Given name ==
- Paxton Baker, American businessman
- Paxton Fielies, South African singer, songwriter, and winner of Idols season 13.
- Paxton Lynch (born 1994), American football player
- Paxton Mills (1948–2001), American radio broadcaster
- Paxton Whitehead (1937–2023), English actor

== Fictional characters ==
- Emma Paxton, main character of The Lying Game series by Sara Shepard
- Sonya Paxton, in Law & Order: Special Victims Unit
- Paxton Fettel, main antagonist of the video game F.E.A.R.
- Paxton Hall-Yoshida, in the television series Never Have I Ever
- Paxton, a diesel engine from Thomas & Friends
- Paxton, the main character of the 2005 film Hostel, played by Jay Hernandez
- Paxton, protagonist of M. R. James's short story "A Warning to the Curious"
- Paxton, the main character of the 2024 film Tarot, played by Jacob Batalon
- Paxton, a little piglet who is a character from the preschool series Timmy Time
- Paxton, the male player character of Pokémon Legends: Z-A

== Lists of people ==
- Senator Paxton (disambiguation)

== See also ==
- Paxton (disambiguation)
