= Carter Lake =

Carter Lake may refer the following places:

- The city of Carter Lake, Iowa and Carter Lake (Iowa–Nebraska) the oxbow lake on the Iowa–Nebraska border for which the city is named
- Carter Lake (Colorado), a reservoir near Loveland, Colorado
- Carter Lake (Vancouver Island), a lake on British Columbia's Vancouver Island
- Carter Lake (Nova Scotia), a lake in Nova Scotia
- Carters Lake, a lake in Georgia (U.S. state)
