= Senator Paxton =

Senator Paxton may refer to:

- Angela Paxton (born 1963), Texas State Senate
- Ken Paxton (born 1962), Texas State Senate
- Lonnie Paxton (born 1968), Oklahoma State Senate
- William A. Paxton (1837–1907), Nebraska State Senate
- William T. Paxton (1869–1942), Virginia State Senate

== See also ==
- Paxton (name)
- Paxton (disambiguation)
