= Abbott Drive =

Highway in Iowa and Nebraska, U.S.

- Abbott Drive highlighted in red, the Iowa 165 portion highlighted in blue
- Length: 4.7 mi (7.6 km)
- Location: Omaha, Nebraska; Carter Lake, Iowa
- South end: Cuming Street & North 10th Street
- North end: J.J. Pershing Drive & the Storz Expressway

Construction
- Inauguration: 1950s

Abbott Drive is a roadway mostly in Omaha, Nebraska, United States, which also passes briefly through Carter Lake, Iowa. It is the easternmost link in Omaha's Park and Boulevard System that connects the eastern edge of Creighton University and North Downtown Omaha or NoDo to Carter Lake, Iowa, Eppley Airfield to John J Pershing Drive on the eastern end of Florence, Nebraska. Considered "Omaha's gateway", the drive includes a distinctive "string of pearls" lighting feature.

In Carter Lake, the 0.4-mile-long (640 m) section is designated as Iowa Highway 165 (Iowa 165). That section of Abbott Drive is the shortest state highway in Iowa and second-shortest in the Iowa highway system overall. Only the Iowa portion of Interstate 129 is shorter at 0.27 miles (430 m). Iowa 165 is entirely within the town of Carter Lake and is the only Iowa highway west of the Missouri River.

== Route description ==
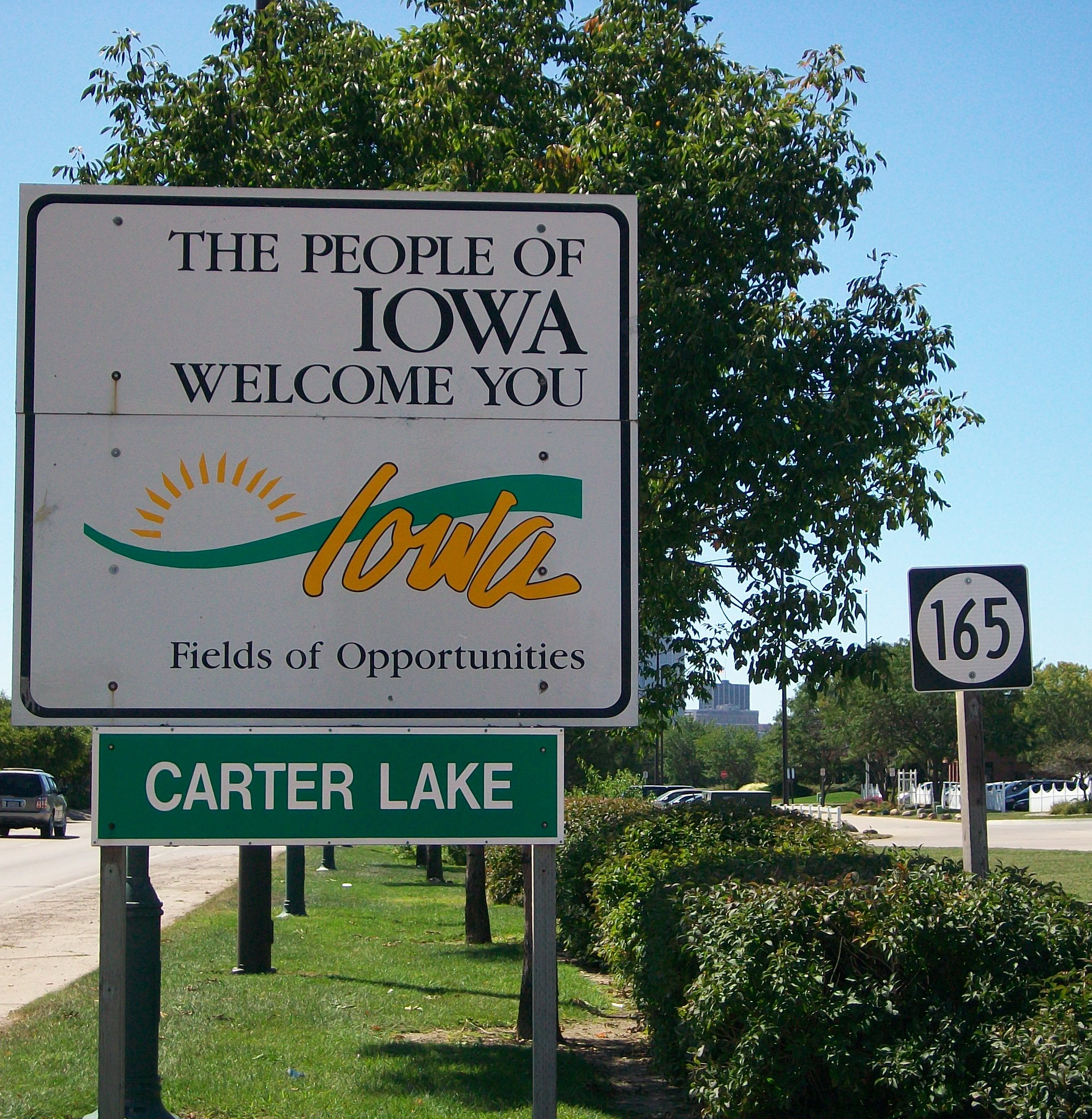
Iowa 165 is the shortest state highway in Iowa

=== Carter Lake, Iowa ===
Iowa 165 is the 0.4-mile-long (640 m) section of Omaha's Abbott Drive which passes briefly through the enclave of Carter Lake, Iowa. (Note: When the border between the Iowa and Nebraska territories (and the subsequent states of Iowa and Nebraska) was established in the region in the mid-1800s, it was consistently defined as the Missouri River. At the time, the specific area of what was then part of Council Bluffs (but what is now Carter Lake) was on the eastern (Iowa) side of the Saratoga Bend (a horseshoe meander of the river). However, heavy flooding in March 1877 changed the Saratoga Bend into a meander cutoff, with the area of Cater Lake now being west of the Missouri River. Since the change in the river course did not alter the established boundaries, the area remained part of Iowa (but not without substantial legal argument). Because the city of Carter Lake is bordered on the southeast by the Missouri River and on the north by Carter Lake (an oxbow lake in the former channel of the Missouri River), the city is only accessible by road via Abbott Drive from the south and east and by East Locust Street from the west.) The route is no longer signed. All Iowa 165 signs were removed in 2023. There are Iowa welcome signs on both ends. Abbott Drive in Omaha is not a state highway, so it does not have any state line signage. Abbott Drive in both states is included in the Federal Highway Administration's National Highway System.

=== Omaha, Nebraska ===
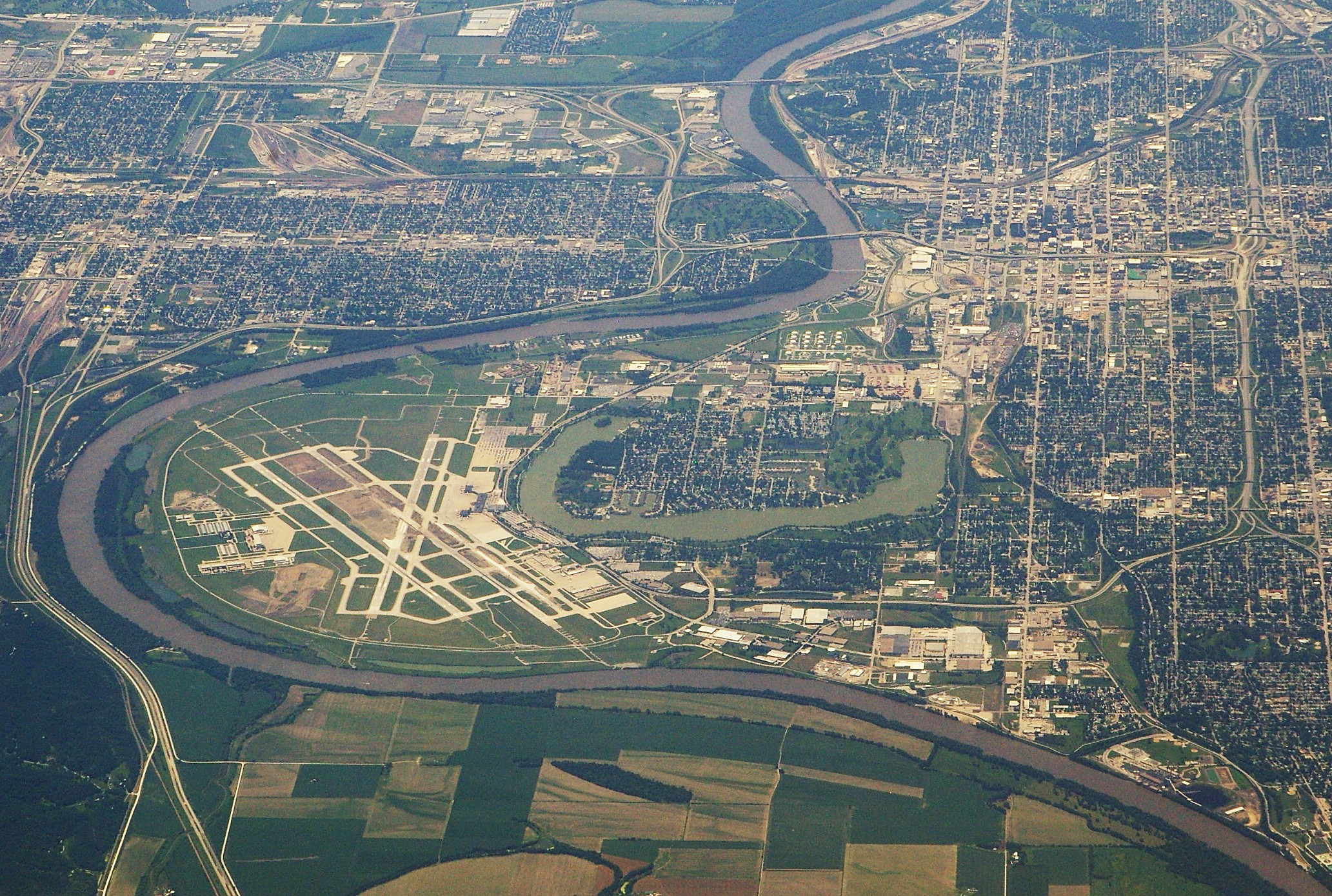
Looking south upon the Omaha area and Abbott Drive, June 2009

Abbott Drive continues north as an unmarked divided boulevard north from Avenue G, which is the Iowa-Nebraska state line. It wraps around Carter Lake and borders Eppley Airfield. The Arthur C. Storz Expressway branches westward, and approximately 1/2 mile (800 m) later the divided roadway ends. At North 9th Street the road becomes John J. Pershing Drive.

== History ==
Abbott Drive was built in the 1950s, connecting the area of downtown Omaha where the Union Pacific Railroad Omaha Shops Facility is located with Eppley Airfield in East Omaha. One of the Kountze descendants built businesses along the drive in the 1970s, including the Easy Parking Company, which was one of the first parking companies in the United States. It moved from its early offices at the Omaha Grain Exchange and built Abbott Drive at Locust Street near Eppley Airfield in 1974. The Freedom Park is located just off Abbott.

After Eppley Airfield was built in the river bottoms to the east of Carter Lake, the shortest route from downtown Omaha to the airport was Abbott Drive which was routed through Carter Lake. Carter Lake initially maintained its section as a municipal road. In 1957, when plans were made to upgrade the airport to accommodate jet aircraft, the Iowa Department of Transportation took over the road.

In the late 1990s and early 2000s a redevelopment project situated Omaha's new Qwest Convention Center, now known as CHI Health Center Omaha, and the operational headquarters of the Gallup Organization along Abbott Drive. An extensive revitalization process led to the installation of the "string of pearls" lighting, along with other improvements. This was funded by the Peter Kiewit Foundation.

== Major intersections ==
State	County	Location	mi	km	Destinations	Notes
Nebraska	Douglas	Omaha	0.00	0.00	Cuming Street / 10th Street – Downtown, Old Market, Zoo & Aquarium, Visitors Center	Southern terminus; road continues west as Cuming St.
Iowa	Pottawattamie	Carter Lake	0.8	1.3	Iowa 165 begins	Nebraska–Iowa line
Iowa	Pottawattamie	Carter Lake	1.2	1.9	Iowa 165 ends	Iowa–Nebraska line
Nebraska	Douglas	Omaha	3.7	6.0	Arthur C. Storz Expressway to US 75 / I-480 / I-680 / I-29	
Nebraska	Douglas	Omaha	4.7	7.6	John J. Pershing Drive / 9th Street	Northern terminus; road continues as John J. Pershing Dr.
1.000 mi = 1.609 km; 1.000 km = 0.621 mi
