= Greater America Exposition =

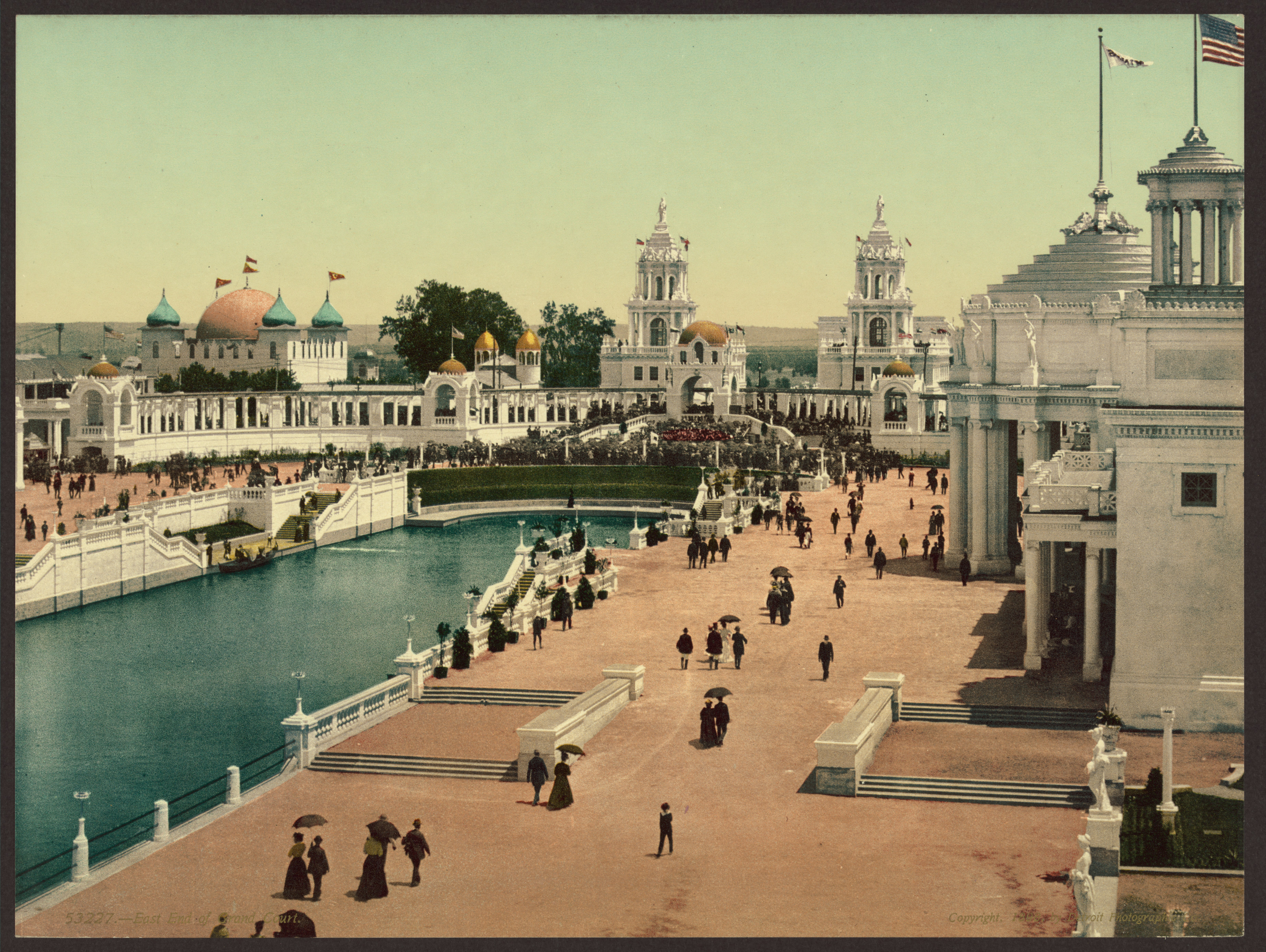
- Grand Court with red brick walkways

Overview
- BIE-class: Unrecognized exposition
- Name: Greater America Exposition
- Visitors: 845,000
- Organized by: George Miller

Location
- Country: United States of America
- City: Omaha
- Venue: Kountze Park
- Coordinates: 41°17′29″N 95°56′21″W

Timeline
- Opening: July 1, 1899
- Closure: October 31, 1899

The Greater America Exposition was a world's fair held on North Omaha, Nebraska from July 1 to October 31, 1899.

== Formation ==
After the 1898 Trans-Mississippi Exposition exhibition a group of investors decided to retain some of the buildings and hold a second season at Kountze Park in 1899 with a new theme. President William McKinley expressed support for the exhibition as an opportunity to show America's new colonial possessions following the Spanish–American War.

== Grounds ==
The grounds were refurbished with 500 staff patching and painting buildings and replanting flower beds. And the concrete walkways were replaced by red brick ones.

== Buildings ==
There were agriculture, apiary, colonial exhibits, dairy, fine arts and liberal arts, horticulture, international, manufactures, and mines and mining, buildings, a machinery hall, a 520 by 150 feet United States pavilion, and auxiliary buildings including press, fire, police and a hospital.

== New possessions ==
One March 18, 1899 the government agreed to transport agents to fetch exhibits from Cuba, Hawaii, the Philippines, and Porto Rico.

60 tubs of Hawaiian plants were destroyed when customs officials dumped the Hawaiian shipment, and a second Hawaiian shipment went missing between San Francisco and Omaha. After the exhibition some of the Hawaiian exhibits were sent to a forthcoming Paris exhibition.

The Cuban village included over 700 snakes, a garrotte and the hangman Valentine Ruiz.

The Philippines had planned to include monkeys, native birds and four water buffaloes. Six water buffaloes were shipped though only two water buffaloes arrived in Omaha.

== See also ==
- Treaty of Paris (1898) for the Treaty that led to the new possessions which McKinley wanted to show.
