= Paxton Township, Dauphin County, Pennsylvania =

Paxton Township, Dauphin County, Pennsylvania, U.S.A. may refer to:

- Lower Paxton Township, Pennsylvania, U.S. of A.
- Middle Paxton Township, Pennsylvania, U.S. of A.
- Upper Paxton Township, Pennsylvania, U.S. of A.

== See also ==
- Paxton (disambiguation)
