= Paxan =

Paxan may refer to:

- Paxans, a fictional xenophobic race in the Star Trek: The Next Generation episode "Clues"
- Paxan Corporation & Affiliated Firms, see List of companies of Iran
- Paxan, a cantone of San Francisco La Unión, Quetzaltenango, Guatemala

== See also ==
- Paxon (disambiguation)
- Paxson (disambiguation)
