= Kountze Park (Omaha, Nebraska) =

Public park in North Omaha, Nebraska, U.S.

- Interactive map of Kountze Park
- Type: Municipal (Omaha)
- Location: North Omaha
- Coordinates: 41.291441423079824°N 95.94218641893426°W
- Area: 11 acres (45,000 m^{2})
- Created: 1889
- Status: Open all year

Kountze Park is an urban public park located at 1920 Pinkney Street in the Kountze Place neighborhood of North Omaha, Nebraska, in the United States. The Park is historically significant as the site of the Trans-Mississippi Exposition of 1898.

== About ==
Kountze Park is bordered by 19th Street on the east and 20th Street on the west, Pinkney Street on the south and Pratt Street on the north. The park is the location of a water park, playground, basketball and tennis courts, and a pavilion. It is also home to a summer program operated by the City of Omaha Parks and Recreation Department.

== History ==
Once on a broad, flat plain midway between the Nebraska Territory towns of Omaha and Saratoga, Kountze Park was part of a plot belonging to banker Herman Kountze.

=== Trans-Mississippi Exposition Site ===
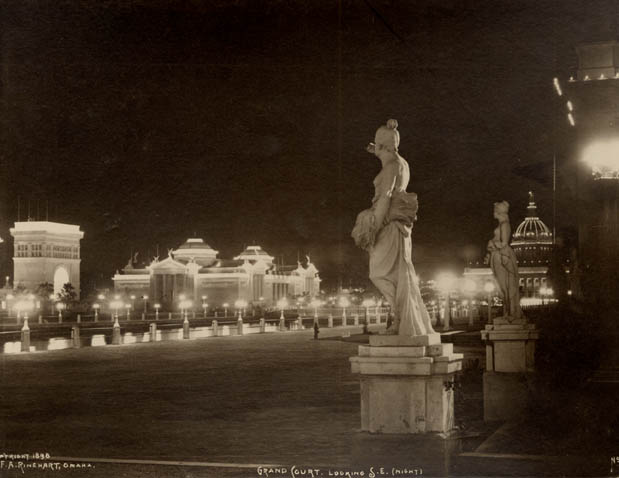
Night view of the Grand Court during the Trans-Mississippi Exposition in 1898.

The Grand Court of the Trans-Mississippi Exposition was located in Kountze Park in 1898. When the search committee sought to acquire a large parcel of land to locate the city's highlight attraction, Kountze's generous offer of 11 acres (45,000 m^{2}) of land for $15,000.00, plus a donation of $5000 worth of land for this future park, was ideal. The site was soon covered with buildings, boulevards, and a beautiful lagoon almost 1/2 mile long, lit by the latest technology of the times, electrical lights.

The Greater America Exposition was held at the same location in many of the same buildings the following year. By the end of 1899, all of the buildings were demolished or removed. In the several years after the Exposition, the lagoon was filled in and the area was graded to form Kountze Park. Around the park a middle- and upper-class community grew, eventually forming a connection between Near North Omaha and Saratoga.

A scenic pond remained at the park as a remnant of the original lagoon; it was filled with dirt in 1953.

== Modern times ==
In 1980, while excavating for a new sewer in Kountze Park, a construction foreman uncovered several pieces of a building from the Exposition. An attempt to recover more artifacts was unsuccessful. Today there are only a few pieces of plaster from Exposition buildings that remain as tangible historical artifacts.

In 1998 many improvements to Kountze Park were made, including new playground equipment, tree plantings and a historical marker that pays homage to the Exposition. Kountze Park has been a repeated crime location in recent years.
