= Levi Carter Park =

Municipal park in East Omaha, Nebraska

Coordinates: 41°18′09″N 95°55′35″W

- Interactive map of Levi Carter Park
- Type: Municipal (Omaha)
- Location: East Omaha
- Area: 519.5 acres (2.102 km^{2})
- Created: 1908
- Status: Open all year

Levi Carter Park is located at 3100 Abbott Drive in East Omaha, Nebraska. It was named after one of Omaha's original industrialists, Levi Carter, who ran a white lead smelter in the area.

== History ==
As recently as 1876, Levi Carter Park was the west bank of the Missouri River. The next year flooding caused the river to jump its banks and shorten the main stream, with the long meander becoming an oxbow lake. Residents on both sides of the river now found themselves on the west bank, attached to Nebraska. Because of this their lake was originally called "Cut-Off Lake."

The name was first changed in the late 1900s to Lake Nicoma for the fabled Omaha wife of early Nebraska settler Peter A. Sarpy. Around that time the lake was a popular resort area. The surrounding park was home to sailing events, Bungalow City, the Omaha Gun Club, and a YMCA Camp as late as the 1930s. The area around the lake included "a boathouse at the foot of Locust street, hotels and club houses were numerous and the lake was the scene of many a pleasant rowing and fishing party."

In the early 1890s the city of Omaha renamed the lake in honor of Levi Carter after his widow donated $1,000,000 to the City of Omaha for upgrades to the area around the lake, which the city named Levi Carter Park.

In 1896 the United States Supreme Court ruled that the neighboring town of Carter Lake belonged to the State of Iowa.

=== CCC developments ===
The Civilian Conservation Corps (CCC) built a camp in the park and facilitated the first major developments, including building roadways, removing old railroad bridges, installing landscaping and constructing boardwalks. They also built up the Omaha Municipal Beach, including installing sand, renovating existing piers and constructing bathhouses capable of handling 10,000 users simultaneously. The bathhouses constructed by the CCC for men and women as well as the concessions building have recently been renovated by the City of Omaha Parks and Recreation department, and were included in the New Deal Work Relief Projects in Nebraska listing National Register of Historic Places in 2010.

=== Carter Lake Pleasure Pier and Kiddieland ===
Carter Lake Park was the site of the Pleasure Pier on land leased from the city, through a business owned and operated by Jim and Dorothy Carpenter. Opening in May 1949, the park was built on the lake's edge. The Pleasure Pier had several adult rides.

Pleasure Pier was also the site of the Carter Lake Kiddieland, an amusement park for children. There were several kiddie rides, pony carts, a ferris wheel, a boat ride, a miniature train, and a ride called a doodle bug.

The amusement park was closed in 1959. The next owner built a marina and added a few rides.

More recently, the Levi Carter Park was the home of radio station Z-92's now defunct annual Z-bash from 1997 to 2005. The annual Stone Soul Picnic has continued to be held at Levi Carter Park since the 1990s.

== Currently ==
Carter Lake provides opportunities for water-skiing, fishing, and boating. The park has baseball fields, football fields, and basketball courts, as well as paths, picnic areas, shelters, restrooms, a pavilion and open space.

== See also ==
- Lists of parks in Omaha, Nebraska
