= A. Willis Robertson =

American politician from Virginia (1887–1971)

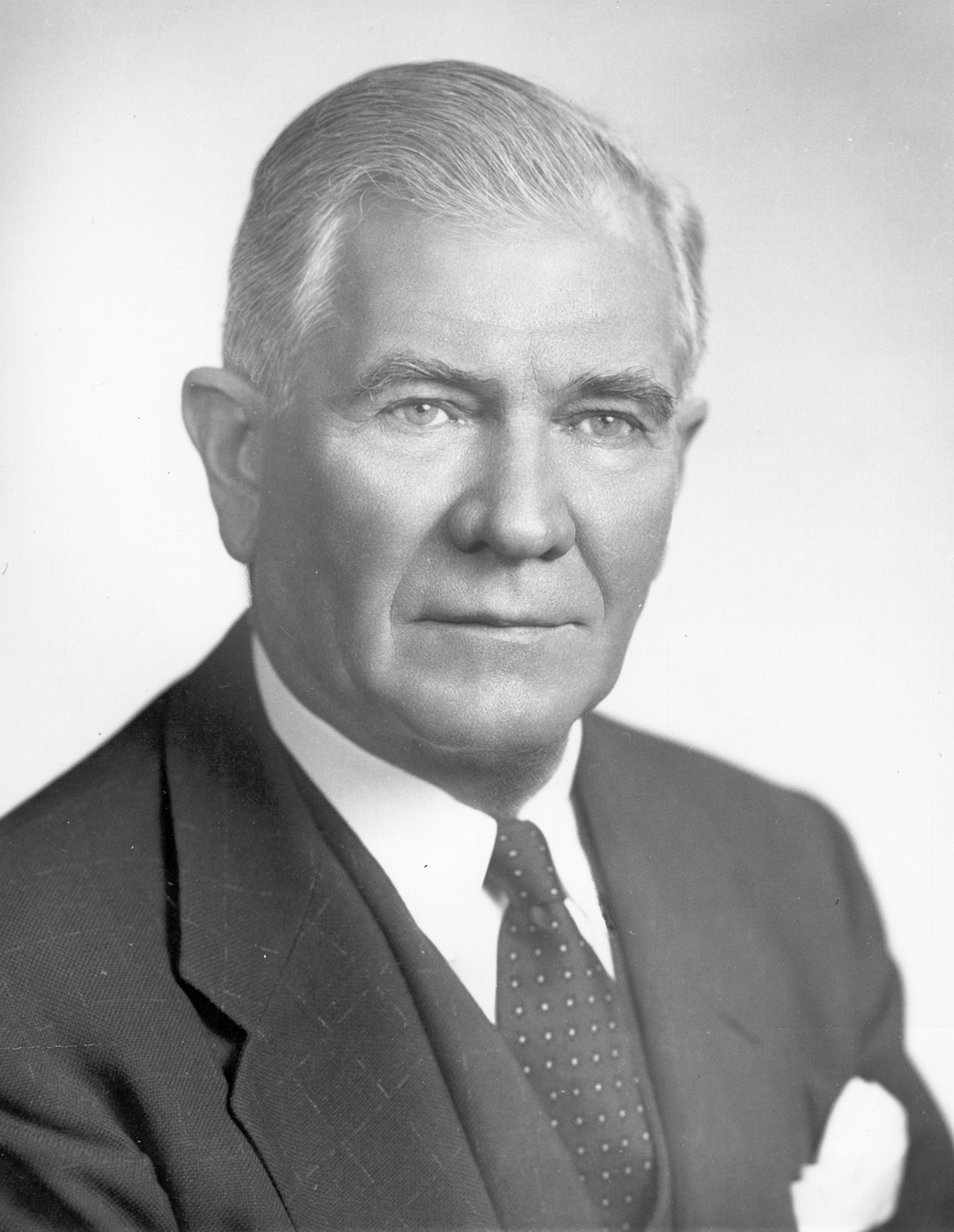

United States Senator from Virginia
- In office November 6, 1946 – December 30, 1966
- Preceded by: Thomas G. Burch
- Succeeded by: William B. Spong Jr.
Committee chairmanships
Chair of the Senate Banking Committee
In office January 3, 1959 – December 30, 1966
Preceded by	J. William Fulbright
Succeeded by	John Sparkman

Member of the U.S. House of Representatives from Virginia
- In office March 4, 1933 – November 5, 1946
- Preceded by: John W. Fishburne
- Succeeded by: Burr Harrison
- Constituency: at-large district, 7th seat (1933–1935); 7th district (1935–1946)

Commonwealth's Attorney for Rockbridge County
- In office August 17, 1922 – December 31, 1927
- Preceded by: Charles S. Glasgow
- Succeeded by: William W. Ackerly

Member of the Virginia Senate from the 22nd district
- In office January 12, 1916 – August 17, 1922
- Preceded by: William T. Paxton
- Succeeded by: Samuel S. Lambeth Jr.

Personal details
- Born: Absalom Willis Robertson; May 27, 1887 Martinsburg, West Virginia, U.S.
- Died: November 1, 1971 (aged 84) Lexington, Virginia, U.S.
- Party: Democratic
- Spouse: Gladys Churchill Willis (m. 1920; died 1968)
- Children: 2, including Pat
- Relatives: Gordon P. Robertson (grandson)
- Education: University of Richmond (BA, LLB)

Military service
- Branch/service: United States Army
- Years of service: 1917‍–‍1919
- Rank: Major
- Battles/wars: World War I; American theater

Absalom Willis Robertson (May 27, 1887 – November 1, 1971) was an American politician from Virginia who served in public office for over 50 years. A member of the Democratic Party and an ally of the Byrd Organization led by fellow U.S. Senator Harry F. Byrd, Robertson represented Virginia in the U.S. House of Representatives (1933–1946) and the U.S. Senate (1946–1966), and had earlier served in the Virginia General Assembly. A member of the conservative coalition during his congressional career, Robertson was a vocal opponent of civil rights. Robertson was also the father of televangelist and political commentator Pat Robertson.

== Early life and education ==
Robertson was born in Martinsburg, West Virginia, the son of Franklin Pierce Robertson and Josephine Ragland (née Willis), just two weeks before fellow Virginia Senator Harry F. Byrd was born in the same community. He graduated from the University of Richmond in 1907.

== Early political and legal career ==
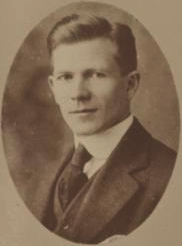
Robertson as a state senator during the 1916 General Assembly

Robertson established a private law practice following graduation, and soon embarked on a political career. He was elected to the Virginia State Senate as a Democrat in 1915 to represent Bedford and Rockbridge counties and Buena Vista, Virginia, in Senate district 22, replacing W. T. Paxton, who had replaced J. Randolph Tucker in 1913. Robertson served from 1916 to 1922, when he resigned and was replaced by Samuel S. Lambeth Jr. in the February 1923 special session. The constituency was renumbered as the 23rd district in advance of the General Assembly's 1924 session. During World War I, Robertson enlisted and served in the United States Army, but was assigned stateside so he could continue that part-time elective office.

Robertson served as Commonwealth Attorney for Rockbridge County, Virginia (an elective office per the Virginia constitution, which prohibited such officials from also serving as legislators or judges during their terms) from 1922 to 1928.

== Federal political career ==
In 1932, Robertson was elected from Virginia's 7th congressional district to the U.S. House of Representatives, and was reelected six times. In 1946, he won a special election for the right to complete the final two years of Senator Carter Glass's term and took office on the day after the election. He won the seat in his own right in 1948 and was reelected two more times without serious opposition.

Among his legislation is the Pittman–Robertson Federal Aid in Wildlife Restoration Act which creates the formula for federal sharing of ammunition tax revenues with states to establish wildlife areas. The program is still in effect and remains a primary financing source for wildlife areas.

Robertson was a typical member of the Byrd Organization, though his opinions differed at times and eventually became independent from the machine. He was chairman of the U.S. Senate Committee on Banking, Housing, and Urban Affairs from 1959 to 1966. In 1956, Robertson was one of the 19 senators who signed the Southern Manifesto against the U.S. Supreme Court decision of Brown v. Board of Education of Topeka (1954), which mandated schools' desegregation.

When President Lyndon B. Johnson sent his wife, Lady Bird Johnson, on a train trip through the South to encourage support for the Civil Rights Act of 1964 and the Voting Rights Act of 1965, Robertson was one of four Southern Senators who refused to meet with her on the whistle-stop trip.

In retaliation, President Johnson personally recruited Virginia State Senator William B. Spong Jr., a considerably more liberal Democrat, to run against Robertson in the 1966 Democratic primary. Even some Byrd Democrats had moved away from resistance to integration as espoused by Robertson and the Organization's patriarch, Harry F. Byrd. Meanwhile, the Twenty-Fourth Amendment and Voting Rights Act had combined to add black and lower-income voters. Spong defeated Robertson in the primary in one of the biggest upsets in Virginia political history. The Byrd Organization's long dominance of Virginia state politics had begun to end.

=== Opposition to civil rights ===
==== March 10, 1956, Christian Science Monitor ====
Asked to comment "on his region's state of mind and any specific American attitudes he feels are necessary to avoid violence and bring healing in a deteriorating situation following the Supreme Court school desegregation order," Robertson stated:

Virginia recognizes the correctness of the 1850 decision of the Massachusetts Supreme Court and in the 155 subsequent decisions of State and Federal courts holding that the equal rights provision of a constitution could be properly satisfied by public schools for the white and colored races which are separate but equal.

During the last 10 years notable progress has been made in the Southern States in meeting that equality requirement. But that progress will be nullified by a program of rapid, enforced desegregation. In fact, public education for both races in some Southern States would be destroyed.

The worst feature of the current desegregation effort, however, is the resulting bitterness and racial animosities in areas where harmony heretofore prevailed. Southerners believe that the cherished constitutional right of every citizen to select his personal associates is being violated.

==== Monday, July 9, 1956, Congressional Record ====
I ask unanimous consent to have printed in the Congressional Record the weekly newsletter of my distinguished successor in the Seventh Congressional District of Virginia, Representative Burr P Harrison, in which he discussed the so-called civil rights bill now under consideration by the House. Representative Harrison's analysis is lucid and accurate, and I fully endorse the position he has taken in opposition to it.

Harrison had stated:

Even a casual reading of this bill, sponsored by the President, reveals it as one of the most drastic measures ever to receive consideration by the Congress. It would set up a Federal Commission with a staff of snoopers who could roam the length and breadth of the United States, armed with subpoenas, looking for civil-rights incidents. One of the objectives of this Commission would be to advance the idea of complete racial integration in private business.

== Death ==
In 1971, Robertson died in Lexington, Virginia and is buried in Stonewall Jackson Memorial Cemetery, later renamed Oak Grove Cemetery.

His papers are held at the Swem Library at the College of William and Mary.

== Electoral history ==
- 1934; Robertson was elected to the U.S. House of Representatives with 68.33% of the vote, defeating Republican J. Everett Will, Socialist Lester Ruffner, and Independent W.R. Eubank.
- 1936; Robertson was re-elected with 63.87% of the vote, defeating Republican Will and Socialist Ruffner.
- 1938; Robertson was re-elected with 63.87% of the vote, defeating Republican Charles C. Leap.
- 1940; Robertson was re-elected with 65.11% of the vote, defeating Republican Jacob A. Garber and now-Communist Ruffner.
- 1942; Robertson was re-elected unopposed.
- 1944; Robertson was re-elected with 59.87% of the vote, defeating Republican D. Wampler Earman.
- 1966; Robertson was defeated in a bid for re-election to the US Senate.

U.S. House of Representatives
Preceded by John W. Fishburne; 7th district	Member of the U.S. House of Representatives from Virginia's at-large congressional district 7th seat 1933–1935	Succeeded by Himself; 7th district
Preceded by Himself at-large (7th seat)	Member of the U.S. House of Representatives from Virginia's 7th congressional district 1935–1946	Succeeded by Burr Harrison
Party political offices
Preceded by Carter Glass	Democratic nominee for U.S. Senator from Virginia (Class 2); 1946, 1948, 1954, 1960	Succeeded by William B. Spong Jr.
U.S. Senate
Preceded by Thomas G. Burch	U.S. Senator (Class 2) from Virginia; 1946–1966; Served alongside: Harry F. Byrd, Harry F. Byrd Jr.	Succeeded by William B. Spong Jr.
Preceded by J. William Fulbright	Chair of the Senate Banking Committee; 1959–1966	Succeeded by John Sparkman
