= William Paxton =

William Paxton may refer to:

== Politicians ==
- William F. Paxton (born 1946), American politician from Kentucky
- William A. Paxton (1837–1907), American politician and businessman from Nebraska
- Sir William Paxton (British businessman) (1744–1824), British MP and businessman
- William T. Paxton (1869–1942), American politician in the Virginia Senate

== Others ==
- William Paxton (Australian businessman) (1818–1893), pharmacist and investor in South Australia
- William Paxton (musician) (1737–1781), English cellist
- William McGregor Paxton (1869–1941), American painter
- Bill Paxton (1955–2017), American actor and director
- Bill Paxton (computer scientist), American computer scientist

== See also ==
- Bill Paxon (born 1954), American politician
