= East Omaha, Nebraska =

Neighborhood in Omaha, Nebraska, U.S.

East Omaha is a geographically designated community located in Omaha, Nebraska. Located three miles (5 km) from downtown Omaha, East Omaha is the site of Eppley Airfield, Omaha's main airport, and Carter Lake. This area was Omaha's first annexation, joining the city in 1854. Originally separated from Omaha by the Missouri River, a large section of the area's land was dissected by a ruling from the U.S. Supreme Court in 1892. Today, 2,500 houses, a school, grocery stores and a church that made up the original town have been demolished and replaced by several government facilities, the Eppley Airfield, and more.

== Boundaries ==
East Omaha is roughly bounded by the Missouri River on the east, Carter Lake and Carter Lake, Iowa on the south, and North Omaha to the west and north. There is one cliff that is the finite western boundary of East Omaha, extending from Jaynes Street north to Reed Street. Bordering neighborhoods include Miller Park, Saratoga and Kountze Place.

Due to the ever-changing nature of the Omaha metro area, recognition of the boundaries of East Omaha has fluctuated through the years. Early reports about East Omaha identified it closely with the Union Pacific Railroad yards just north of downtown. The boundary moved north over the years, and today is loosely fixed along Florence Boulevard to the west, the Missouri River to the east, the Omaha Public Power District Plant to the north, and Carter Lake, Iowa to the south. Even these boundaries are in flux. The Omaha Chamber of Commerce has taken to referring to any area east of 72nd street as "east Omaha".

== History ==
In 1853, Edmond Jefferies filed a claim on 30 acres (120,000 m^{2}) of land in what was known as East Omaha. This area was Omaha's first annexation, joining the city in 1854.

The CB&Q railroad's East Omaha Land Company was first formed in 1887 to develop land for homes and industrial uses. The Company spent a total of $300,000 clear low-lying land of willows and to grade streets before lots were offered for sale. The company initially owned 1,000 acres (4.0 km^{2}), rapidly increasing through further acquisition. In 1903 the East Omaha Land Company advertised East Omaha as "the manufacturing center of Omaha".

Before the creation of Carter Lake, Iowa, the East Omaha community wrapped around a meander on the west bank of the Missouri River. In 1877, flooding caused the river to jump its banks and shortened the main stream. The meander became an oxbow lake, and residents on both sides of the river now found themselves on the right bank, attached to Nebraska. The area was home to "East Omaha Island", the "Florence Lake", and a number of icehouses on Carter Lake, which was then called Cut-Off Lake.

East Omaha once included all of Carter Lake, Iowa. Due to a flood that occurred in March 1877, the course of the Missouri River was redirected 1.25 mi (2 km) to the southeast. The remnants of the old river course became an oxbow-shaped lake, for which the Iowa town is named.

After the river jumped its banks, a lengthy court case ensued. The Supreme Court of the United States held that the sudden change in the river's course did not change the original boundary. They ruled that the community to become known as Carter Lake was still part of Iowa. (Nebraska v. Iowa, 143 U.S. 359 (1892)). The Court delayed a final decree to allow Nebraska and Iowa to reach an agreement consistent with its holding, which they did. (145 U.S. 519 (1892)). Now, all roads into Carter Lake run through East Omaha and downtown Omaha.

The largest single real estate deal in Nebraska up to 1890 is said to have occurred there. That year an unknown property in East Omaha was sold to the Omaha Bridge and Terminal company, a subsidiary of the Illinois Central, for nearly $700,000. The south end of East Omaha was home to the Union Pacific Rail Yards, with one former hobo reporting that he tricked a railroad cop, also called "railroad dicks", with his clothing,

""I even talked to a known bad dick in the yards in East Omaha, and he treated me like a brother while at the same time he was looking around for a hobo to arrest for trespassing on railroad property. I thought to myself, Good old clothes, a little deception is a wonderful thing."

East Omaha, east of Carter Lake, was the preferred site for the Trans-Mississippi and International Exposition of 1897. The area considered was between Carter Lake on the south and Florence Lake on the north, which is now where Beechwood Trailer Courts are now located. Florence Lake Hotel was once on this site. A period newspaper account reported that,

"It has about 1,000 acres (4.0 km^{2}) available... offers level ground... is dotted with trees... plentiful water supply. It is less than 3 miles (4.8 km) form the Downtown Post Office. A paved street (16th) already extends almost to the site and a new bridge across the Missouri River makes accessible from Iowa."

However, the East Omaha site ended up losing out to a site in North Omaha.

At the turn of the 20th century the area was home to numerous businesses important to Omaha's growth, with early examples including a hominy mill and a plaster mill. The Carter White Lead Company built a large scale plant in East Omaha.

On its north edge, East Omaha was home to the Beechwood community. In 1948 the Beechwood School District joined Omaha Public Schools, almost eliminating all traces of the Beechwood community. However, the community is still noted on maps.

=== History timeline ===
The following items have been documented by a local historian.

- Pre-1853— Omaha nation occupied area
- 1853— First European-American claimed placed on East Omaha
- 1854— East Omaha first annexed by the City of Omaha
- 1877— Flood created the oxbow lake to become known as Carter Lake
- 1887— The East Omaha Land Company was established and the area comprising East Omaha was cleared for sale
- 1887— The East Omaha Factory District was cleared for development.
- 1887— Sherman School opened as a two-room schoolhouse
- 1889— Pershing School opened as a one-room schoolhouse without a name
- 1890— Most expensive Nebraska land deal to date occurred in East Omaha
- 1890— The new Levi Carter White Lead Company opened in the East Omaha Factory District
- 1892— Omaha lost Carter Lake-area to Iowa in U.S. Supreme Court case
- 1893— Illinois Railroad East Omaha Bridge first opened
- 1897— East Omaha considered for Trans-Mississippi and International Exposition, not selected
- 1908— Edward and Selena Carter Cornish donated 260-acres to the City of Omaha to form the Levi Carter Park.
- 1913— Easter Sunday tornado obliterated East Omaha
- 1921— The Carter White Lead Company factory in East Omaha was permanently closed
- 1920s— Carter Lake secedes from Council Bluffs and wants to re-join East Omaha; Omaha denies the offer
- 1925— The Omaha Municipal Airport opened; eventually renamed Eppley Airfield
- 1926— The new brick eight-room Pershing School opened
- 1930— Carter Lake, Iowa incorporated
- 1947— Floods destroy many homes in the area
- 1947— East Omaha District 61 was absorbed into the Omaha Public School District and in January 1948 the Pershing School became an Omaha school.
- 1948— The single school of the Beechwood School District 62 merged with Omaha Public Schools, closed permanently and students were sent to Pershing School
- 1952— East Omaha was evacuated as a major flood brought 16-mile-wide waters to the area. President Harry S. Truman visited
- 1956— East Omaha was annexed into Omaha again
- 1967— Major flooding hit East Omaha again
- 1976— Pershing School was permanently closed and students were sent to Sherman. The building was demolished soon after
- 1980— Illinois Railroad East Omaha bridge was closed to traffic
- 1984— Major flooding hit East Omaha
- 1990— Major flooding hit East Omaha
- 1993— Major flooding hit East Omaha
- 2024— All residential houses except one are gone from East Omaha. Today there are incarceration facilities, homeless shelters, rental car facilities, and light industry in the area.

== Economy ==
East Omaha is home to Omaha's main airport, Eppley Airfield. It is also a major industrial manufacturing and warehousing area, with the Lozier Corporation located at 6336 John J. Pershing Drive and several shipping companies in the area. The Omaha Public Power District North Omaha plant is also in the area.

== Education ==
Schools have long played an important role in East Omaha's identity.

The most important school in East Omaha is Sherman School, an Omaha Public Schools building. Sherman's history extends back to 1887 when a two-room building was constructed by a neighborhood developer at N. 16th and Jaynes Street. At its largest, the school had kindergarten through eighth grade had almost 600 students. Today the building is located at N. 14th and Ellison Avenue and has students in kindergarten through fifth grades.

Other schools in the area were originally located outside the Omaha school district. One was the two-room Beechwood Elementary School, part of the now-defunct Beechwood School District, located at North 12th and Browne Avenue. Originally designed for 50 students, it had grades kindergarten to 8th grade. Under pressure of 125 students over-crowding its building without the funds to continue operating, the district closed in 1947 and was merged into Omaha Public Schools. Students were sent to Sherman School and the building was razed soon after.

The other school in East Omaha was called Pershing School, and it was operated by its own independent school district. Located at North 28th Avenue East and Locust Street, the school was opened in the 1880s as a two-room school house, and was replaced in 1926 by a large brick structure. Designed with eight classrooms and an auditorium, the building had a large playground and a basement. After several floods and the expansion of nearby Eppley Airfield, it was demolished in 1975 and students were sent to Sherman and North High.

St. Therese School was a Catholic school opened by Ursuline Sisters at N. 14th and Fort in 1919. Serving neighborhood students in kindergarten through eighth grade, the original building was replaced with a large parish structure in 1927. Serving as many as 125 students in six classrooms, students used the parish hall in the basement and attended Mass in the sanctuary where regular services were held. The school closed permanently in 2012.

== Environment ==
A recent report named East Omaha "one of the most dangerous toxic waste sites in the nation" after the United States Environmental Protection Agency (EPA) showed that more than 2,600 children in the area have lead poisoning. In early 2003, a large section of East Omaha was declared a Superfund site after thousands of yards tested positive for high levels of lead contamination resulting from a nearby lead smelting plant that operated for more than a century. The EPA partnered with the state, county and city to remediate the Omaha Lead Superfund site; however, a 2026 investigation by ProPublica showed that many residential properties in Omaha still contained high levels of lead.

=== Geographic details ===
East Omaha sits on a flood plain west of the Missouri River. The area is the location of Carter Lake, an oxbow lake. The lake was once the site of East Omaha Island. In the crux of Carter Drive is an unnamed sulphur spring, and located south of there is Hardwood Creek. East Omaha was once the location of Florence Lake, which dried up at some point in the 1920s.

The portion of East Omaha that lies east of 1st Street (based on the Greater Omaha street numbering system) loosely uses the street numbering of Carter Lake, Iowa. Numbering of streets to the southeast and east of Carter Lake directly corresponds with streets in Carter Lake, but due to smaller block sizes in the East Omaha neighborhood immediately to the north of Carter Lake, north–south streets intersecting East Fort Street do not perfectly match between 8th St. E and 15th St. E. (for example, 8th Street East in Omaha is directly north of North 10th Street in Carter Lake).

== Locations of interest ==
East Omaha is the site of several important facilities for the entire City of Omaha as well as the local community. The Sherman Community Center has been home to recreational activities and meeting space for East Omaha for more than 20 years. Levi Carter Lake Park has been offering recreational opportunities to Omaha for more than 100 years.

The Open Door Mission has been an Omaha institution since the 1950s. It relocated to 2706 North 21st Street East in 1986. The USS Hazard is a former US warship permanently berthed at the Omaha Marina in East Omaha. She is maintained as a World War II museum and memorial. The Omaha Correctional Center, or OCC, is a medium/minimum security facility located on a 37-acre (150,000 m^{2}) site in East Omaha, just south of Eppley Airfield. Eppley Airfield serves as Omaha's primary airport, providing service throughout the United States, Canada and Mexico.

== Recreation ==
In the late 19th century the East Omaha Lake (also called Cut-Off Lake and Lake Nakoma) was renamed after the founder of the Carter Lead Co., and is still called Carter Lake. The surrounding park was home to sailing events, Bungalow City, the Omaha Gun Club, and a YMCA Camp as late as the 1930s. In 1896 the United States Supreme Court ruled that Carter Lake, which was originally an arm of the Missouri River, belonged to the State of Iowa.

In 1979, the Omaha chapter of the Antique Motorcycle Club of America held its first motorcycle show and swap meet at the Four "T" Service shop in East Omaha.

== Residences ==
East Omaha was an early Omaha suburb dating from the late 19th century. It was founded by the Chicago, Burlington and Quincy Railroad's East Omaha Land Company, which spent a total of $300,000 to clear the low-lying land of willows and grade streets before lots were offered for sale. The Ames family of Boston, Massachusetts were early investors responsible for platting the area and dealing with the ever-changing Missouri River. However, one 1937 plat map entirely dismisses the residential and commercial district of East Omaha, instead focusing on the then-underdeveloped area surrounding Eppley Airfield.

Through the 1920s, East Omaha neighbors in the area around Carter Lake belonging to Iowa lacked the basic city services enjoyed by their fellow residents of Council Bluffs who lived east of the Missouri River. Ironically, they were still subject to same city taxes. The community successfully seceded from Council Bluffs in the 1920s, intending to become part of Omaha. The Nebraska city didn't want to pay to extend sewers or water lines either. In 1930 Carter Lake was incorporated as its own municipality, still within the boundaries of the State of Iowa.

== Weather ==
In 1877, Carter Lake was formed by a massive flood which altered the course of the Missouri River.

East Omaha was severely damaged by the Easter Sunday tornado of 1913, which destroyed many businesses and neighborhoods. When the tornado crossed 16th Avenue, the path extended from Binney Street on the south to Emmet Street on the north. The tornado devastated the Missouri Pacific roundhouse and went across Carter Lake and the East Omaha bottoms. When it crossed the lake the twister "sucked the water high into the air, a real water spout. The cottages along the lake were mostly destroyed, the Illinois Central trestle obliterated and scores of store buildings wrecked. At this point the width of the path is said to have been nearly half a mile wide."

As many as 1,000 people were displaced by a flood in 1943, which sent the Missouri River, Carter Lake, and the old Florence Lake into peoples' homes and businesses throughout East Omaha. One report states,

"At Omaha, the river crested at 22.45 feet (6.84 m) and had a discharge of 200,000 cubic feet/second (89,760,000 gallons/minute). 3000 men helped fight the flood, but after a week, the River found a weak spot in the temporary dike and the battle was lost. 100 homes were flooded when the floodwater also breached a new dike at Locust Street. The industrial section on Grace Street was flooded, and businesses were closed several days. 1000 people were evacuated from Carter Lake and East Omaha as the old Lake Florence bed filled and inundated the airport with seven feet of water in 18 hours. One person was killed in Omaha and the damage estimate there was $1.4 million."

The flood of April 13, 1952 led to 40,000 people being evacuated from East Omaha and Carter Lake. President Harry S. Truman personally visited the scene of the flooding in Omaha and officially declared it a disaster area.

== See also ==
- Timeline of racial tension in Omaha, Nebraska
