= Paxson =

Paxson may refer to:

== People ==
- Paxson (surname)
- Paxson Vickers (died 1865), American politician and manufacturer from Pennsylvania

== Places ==
- Paxson, Alberta, Canada
- Paxson, Alaska, USA
  - Paxson Airport
- Paxson, Virginia, USA
- Camp Paxson Boy Scout Camp, Seeley Lake, Lolo National Forest, Montana, USA
- Isaiah Paxson Farm, Solebury Township, Bucks County, Pennsylvania, USA

== Other ==
- Paxson Communications, former name of ION Media Networks

== See also ==
- Paxon (disambiguation)
- Paxton (disambiguation)
