= Paxon =

Paxon may refer to:

- Bill Paxon (born 1954), U.S. Congressman from New York
- Frederic John Paxon, a department store executive for Davison-Paxon-Stokes
- Paxon School for Advanced Studies, a high school in Duval County, Florida, US

== See also ==
- Davison-Paxon, a department store in Atlanta, Georgia, US
- Paxan (disambiguation)
- Paxson (disambiguation)
- Paxton (disambiguation)
