= Paxton High School =

Paxton High School can refer to:

- Paxton High School (Florida) in Paxton, Florida
- Paxton High School (Nebraska) in Paxton, Nebraska

== See also ==
- Paxton (disambiguation)
