= Paxton House =

Paxton House may refer to:

in Scotland

- Paxton House, Berwickshire

in the United States

(by state)

- Paxton House (Brookhaven, Mississippi), listed on the NRHP in Mississippi
- Paxton (Powhatan, Virginia), listed on the NRHP in Virginia

== See also ==
- Paxton (disambiguation)
