= Saratoga, Nebraska Territory =

Saratoga
- Neighborhood
- Nicknames: Saratoga Springs, Sulphur Springs
- Location within Nebraska Location within the United States
- Coordinates: 41°18′N 95°56′W
- Country: United States
- State: Nebraska
- City: Omaha
- Established: 1856

Saratoga Springs, Nebraska Territory, or Saratoga, was a boom and bust town founded in 1856 that thrived for several years. During its short period of influence the town grew quickly, outpacing other local settlements in the area including Omaha and Florence, and briefly considered as a candidate for the Nebraska Territorial capitol. Saratoga was annexed into Omaha in 1887, and has been regarded a neighborhood in North Omaha since then.

== Location ==
Located today in the proximity of 24th Street and Saratoga Avenue in North Omaha, the town was once noted as being "three miles (4.8 km) north of downtown Omaha and two miles (3.2 km) south of Florence." In modern terms, the Saratoga townsite lay between Locust Street on the south and Fort Street on the north, between the current Carter Lake on the east and North 36th Street on the west.

The town's economy, including a hotel and several bars, relied on its connection to the Saratoga Bend on the Missouri River, less than one mile (1.6 km) away. In 1856 the Nebraska Territory riverbank at Saratoga Bend was the site of regular steamboat landings, with more regular traffic than the fledgling Omaha City, three miles (4.8 km) south. The town was also founded near the site of Sulpher Spring, which because of the town became renowned for its healing powers. The site was also the grave of the daughter of Young Elk, an elder of the Omaha Tribe who advised Logan Fontenelle. One historic report identifies a sulfur spring at the "foot of Grand Avenue", which is the location of "Bluff View Park", also called "Horseshoe Bend".

== History ==
Erastus F. Beadle (1821–1894), an agent for New York land speculators, was the impetus for the town's creation and growth. This type of speculation relied on money from wildcat banks, which were shady investment schemes popular at the time. Beadle named the community after his own hometown of Saratoga, New York, because the mineral springs are similar to that area's Saratoga Springs. It was hoped these springs would draw many visitors to the area, and anticipating that, a large hotel (the Saratoga Springs) was built.

Within several months the town had more than 50 buildings, including several businesses and churches. In February 1857 the Nebraska Territory Legislature passed an act incorporating the first University of Nebraska at Saratoga. When that did not transpire, the university was newly incorporated in Lincoln. The post office was established in September 1857. After Beadle left in late 1857, the economic "Panic of '57" set in and greatly distressed Saratoga's economy; the Post Office closed in 1858, and the town then stagnated until it was absorbed by Omaha. In 1858, the Douglas County Agricultural Society was organized. It held its first fair in Saratoga.

The hotel did not take off, and five years later Brownell Hall began classes in the abandoned hotel building. The Episcopal school for girls opened at the location of the Saratoga Springs Hotel. The Nebraska Territory bishop paid $3500 for 6 acres (24,000 m^{2}) of land and the building. By 1869 a new school building had been constructed at 16th & Jones in Omaha and the old hotel was abandoned.

Richard Siemon was the operator of the Saratoga Brewery located at the present-day junction of North 16th Street and Commercial Avenue, the presumed location of one of the area's many artesian wells. By 1863 the company was sold to Ebenezer Dallow, and eventually it became the famous Storz Brewing Company.

In 1866 local citizens erected a one room schoolhouse called Saratoga School, one of the first public schools in Nebraska. In 1877 the Missouri River changed course and cut-off the Saratoga Bend, creating what became known as Carter Lake (lake), ending the community's reliance on river traffic. The community floundered for several years, and in 1887 it was annexed into the City of Omaha.

=== Important locations ===
- Erastus Beadle residence – Built in New York and shipped to Saratoga in pieces, the house was located immediately east of the fairgrounds, which were located on the future site of the Omaha Driving Park.
- Saratoga School – Originally built in 1866, the school was located at 2504 Meredith Avenue.
- Saratoga Brewery – Opened by Richard Siemon in 1854, it was located at the present-day junction of North 16th Street and Commercial Avenue. Eventually purchased by Gottlieb Storz, it became the Storz Brewing Company.
- Saratoga Springs Hotel – Later serving as the first home for the Brownell Hall, it was located at North 24th and Grand Streets.
- Saratoga Bend – This section of the Missouri River was cut off in a large flood, forming present-day Carter Lake. This is where Sulphur Springs was located.
- Main Street – Located at 24th and Grand Streets. It was referred to as "Saunders Street" from the 1850s through the 1880s, then became known as "North 24th Street."
- Druid Hall - Located at 2412 Ames Ave., this building was constructed by the Woodmen of the World, occupied by the Veterans of Foreign Wars and is now used by Nebraska's Prince Hall Masons Grand Lodge.
- Omaha Driving Park — Located between North 24th and North 16th Streets from Sprague to Ames Avenue at different points, this was the location of the first Nebraska State Fair and the Douglas County Fair for many years between 1858 and 1900. Buffalo Bill's Wild West show was first held there for public performance in 1883. In 1898 it was host to many events for the Trans-Mississippi and International Exposition.

== Legacy ==
In 1886, Omaha banker Herman Kountze platted much of the Saratoga area as a new affluent suburb of Omaha called Kountze Place. The Saratoga community was notable again in Omaha's history in 1927. That year North Omaha businessmen formed the North Omaha Activities Association in order to re-develop Saratoga School's playing field into a college football field for Omaha University's football team. At that time the university was located just south in the posh Kountze Place suburb. With new bleachers built to accommodate a crowd of a thousand, the Saratoga Field was home to OU's team until 1951.

Saratoga Avenue in North Omaha was the Main Street of the town of Saratoga. Saratoga Elementary School was incorporated into Omaha Public Schools in the late 19th century. Brownell-Talbot School, once located in the heart of Saratoga, thrives today and is recognized as the oldest school in Nebraska.

== See also ==
- Nebraska Territory
- History of North Omaha, Nebraska
- Timeline of North Omaha, Nebraska history
- Landmarks in North Omaha, Nebraska

== Bibliography ==
- Finlayson, A.J. (1978) The Mysterious Disappearance of Saratoga.
- Wilhite, A. (1970) The Saratoga Story, Inflated Beginnings. - Omaha History Society
- "A Picture History of Omaha’s Saratoga Neighborhood" by Adam Fletcher Sasse for NorthOmahaHistory.com.
