= Thomas Paxton (disambiguation) =

Thomas Paxton (1820–1887) was an Ontario politician.

Thomas Paxton may also refer to:

- Sir Thomas Paxton, 1st Baronet (1860–1930), Scottish politician
- Tom Paxton, (born 1937), American folksinger
