= Keystone, Omaha =

Neighborhood in Omaha, Nebraska

Coordinates: 41.296°N 96.039°W

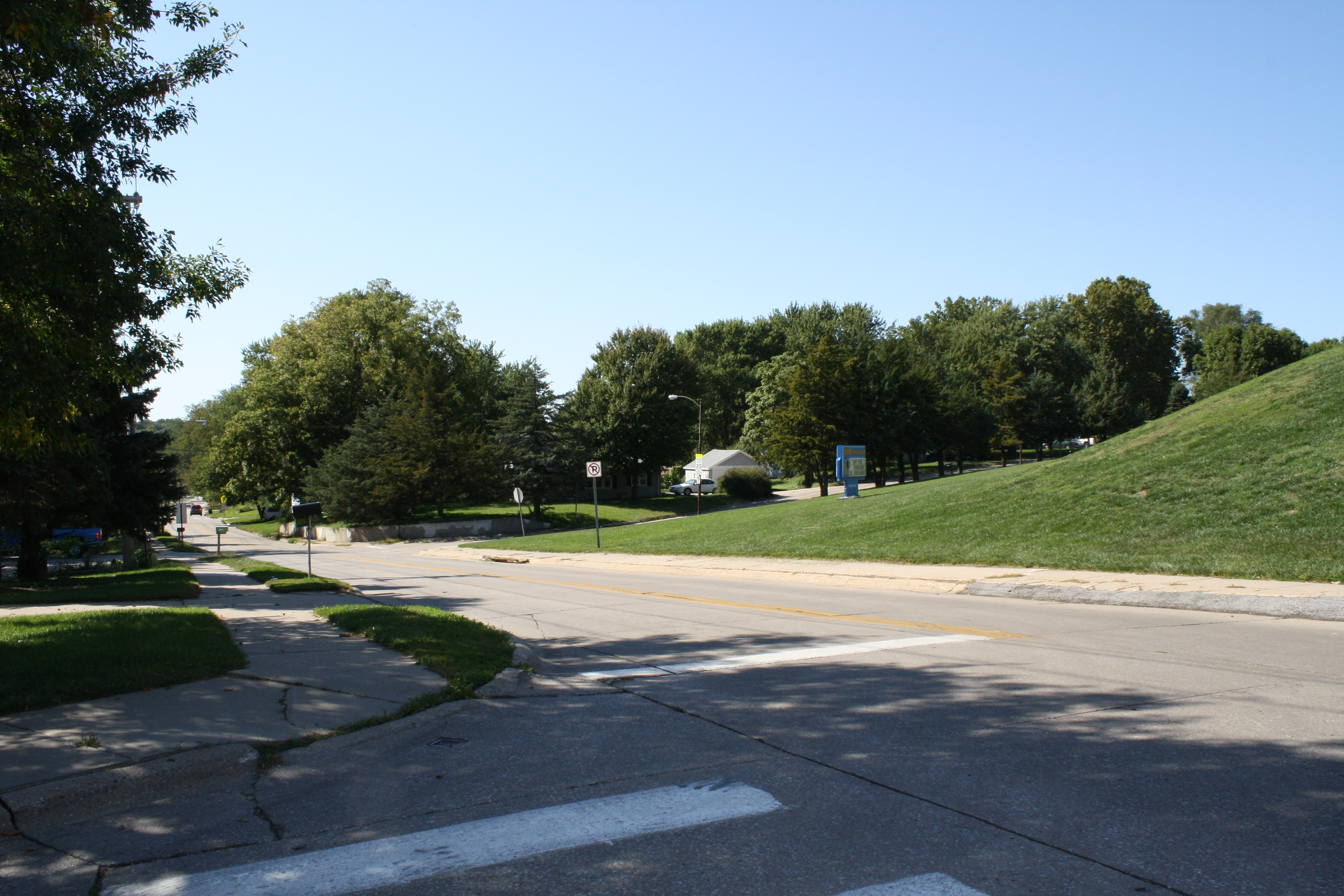

Keystone is a neighborhood located within Omaha, Nebraska in the North Central area of the city. The area began as a collection of farms and land owners, the most prominent being William A. Paxton who owned a large block of land mostly within the central part of what is now known as Keystone. The neighborhood is a mix of modern and traditional development as older areas developed with a grid like layout. Keystone is well known for not being a grid as no single street takes you from one border to the other and several winding roads create a different feel than most areas prior to Keystone. Multiple businesses are in Keystone, primarily along the borders, including the Nebraska Humane Society which has a large campus on the north side. Today Keystone is an active neighborhood well known for its tree lined roads.

== History ==
=== 1854–1910 ===
During the late 1800s, the area of Keystone was mostly pasture land with a few farms in various areas. After the Kansas–Nebraska Act was passed, land sales began. The land was purchased initially by Daniel Voorhees. William A. Paxton purchased the land from Voorhees in 1883 and a year later deeded it to his son William Paxton Jr., who would own the land until his death in 1910. The Keystone Stock Farm occupied much of the land owned by the Paxtons.

In 1907, the land surrounding the Paxton house was called the Keystone Park Addition. The land was divided into tracts and sold in amounts anywhere from 2 acres to 20 acres. Advertisements started running in the Omaha World-Herald advertising the great opportunity for land that had yet to be plowed. Boulevards were laid out which is why the center of Keystone is not like many of the neighborhoods that developed at the time where they mostly had a grid like layout. The boulevards were laid out with trees lining them and were intended to be winding to create a scenic view in the area.

=== 1911–1940s ===
Homes began to pop up around the current homes and started to stretch down Boyd Street. After William Paxton Jr's death, tracts began to be sold. Advertisements used the winding, tree lined roads as a selling point. In 1925 Adams School was built just south of the Paxton home that sat at the intersection of N. 79th St and Evans, today part of the school's playground. As the area grew, a prominent resident, Carl Renstrom, lived on Keystone Drive until he moved to his new mansion on Pacific Street. Another prominent resident of Keystone was Tom Dennison, also known as the Grey Wolf, who lived in a home on Graceland Drive. The home was a large brown brick home with a very stately property. By the 1920s Cherrycroft was offering kennels as was Tom Dennison. Additionally, the area known as Pinecrest which is the section just south of where Fort St meets Military Road had some homes begin to pop up that still exist today.

=== 1950s–present ===
Keystone grew rapidly in the post World War II era. Over two-thirds of the homes now standing were built after 1950 and by the early 1960s the area became largely developed. Many of the homes built at this time share a very similar layout but are often identical to each other. Some homes were torn down and new homes were built over them. The number of homes built after 1980 is less than 100, excluding the low-income housing area on Boyd Street. As the neighborhood grew, there were various needs that came up through the years including the need for a new school, the need for churches, the need for parks, and other normal amenities of a growing neighborhood.

Early Keystone developed with American elm tree lined roads. Ash and Maple trees gradually replaced the original American elm canopy when Dutch elm disease arrived in the mid-1960s.

The Keystone Pool was built by the early 1950s as requested by the residents. Mr. Hargleroad who owned much of the northwest end of Keystone agreed to build the pool and purchase 200 memberships for the area if the neighbors purchased 200 more. The Hargleroad addition makes up most of the northern section of Keystone. It was Incorporated in 1957 to be Keystone Klub Inc.

== Layout ==
Unlike some of the older neighborhoods, Keystone does not have a grid-like setup outside of a few blocks. However, unlike many new subdivisions the layout does not rely on cul-de-sacs to reduce through traffic.

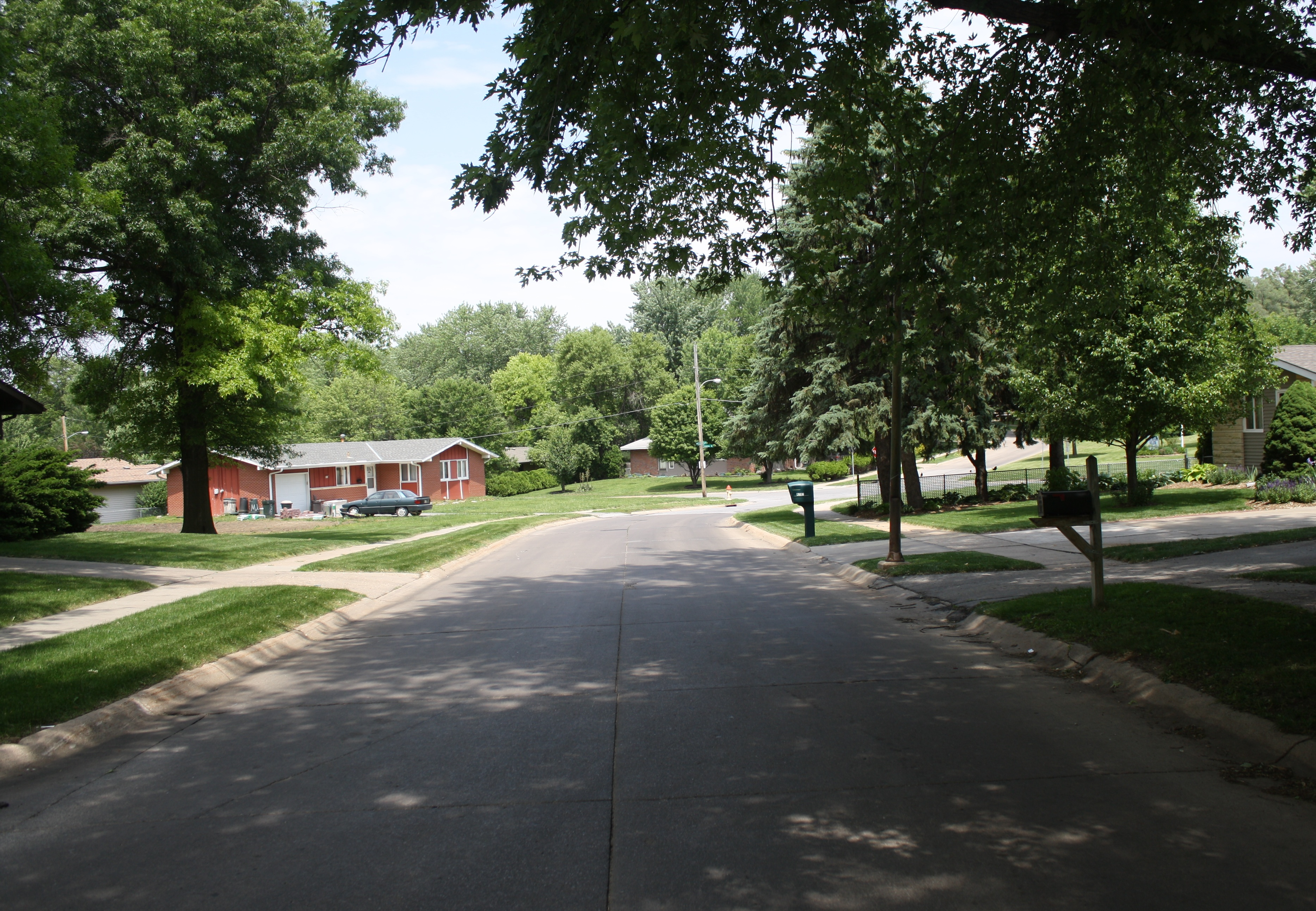

== Organizations ==
Keystone has a task force and neighborhood patrol. The Keystone Task Force organizes community events including fundraisers, scholarships, and various other activities. The Keystone Neighborhood Patrol is a group of neighbors who volunteer some of their time to patrol the neighborhood to help prevent crime within the neighborhood.

== Notable locations ==
The Keystone pool is a popular feature of the neighborhood. When Keystone was being developed, the current neighbors asked the developer to build a swimming pool. The developer agreed and the pool was built at the corner of 83rd and Templeton. The pool has changed through the years building a pavilion and rebuilding the "baby pool", the smaller pool for younger kids.

Keystone also has three moderately sized parks. Esther Pilster Park on North 88th Avenue south of Boyd has some playground equipment and lies just south of a ball park which is across the street from a soccer field. Keystone Park at 78th and Keystone Dr has two tennis courts along with some playground equipment. Democracy Park just north of 87th St and Templeton Dr has playground equipment, a concrete volcano that was covered with stones from the Brandeis estate in the early 1970s, and a ball field that creates the corner of Templeton and Fort St.

== The Keystone Trail ==
The Keystone Trail originates in Democracy Park and runs for miles through midtown Omaha. The trail travels for several miles through what is now midtown Omaha. Many people use the trail each day for activities from biking to jogging to simply going for a walk. The trail head starts at the small parking lot of Democracy Park. There have been talks for years to extend the trail north to Lake Cunningham passing near Omaha Northwest High School. This has yet to happen but the trail is still very popular and active through the spring, summer, and fall.

The trail follows the Little Papillion Creek. There is a pedestrian bridge that crosses the creek in between Larimore Ave and Fowler Ave that comes out to the old train track rails behind a present-day car wash and auto body shop. The trail is 15 miles long and ends at Haworth Park in Bellevue, Nebraska. The influence of the railroad is seen along the trail within Keystone. The trail runs along 88th St but curves towards 90th St just before reaching Keystone Dr. The remnants of the old Fremont, Elkhorn, and Missouri Valley railroad that followed the same path can still be seen today.
