= Paxton Hotel =

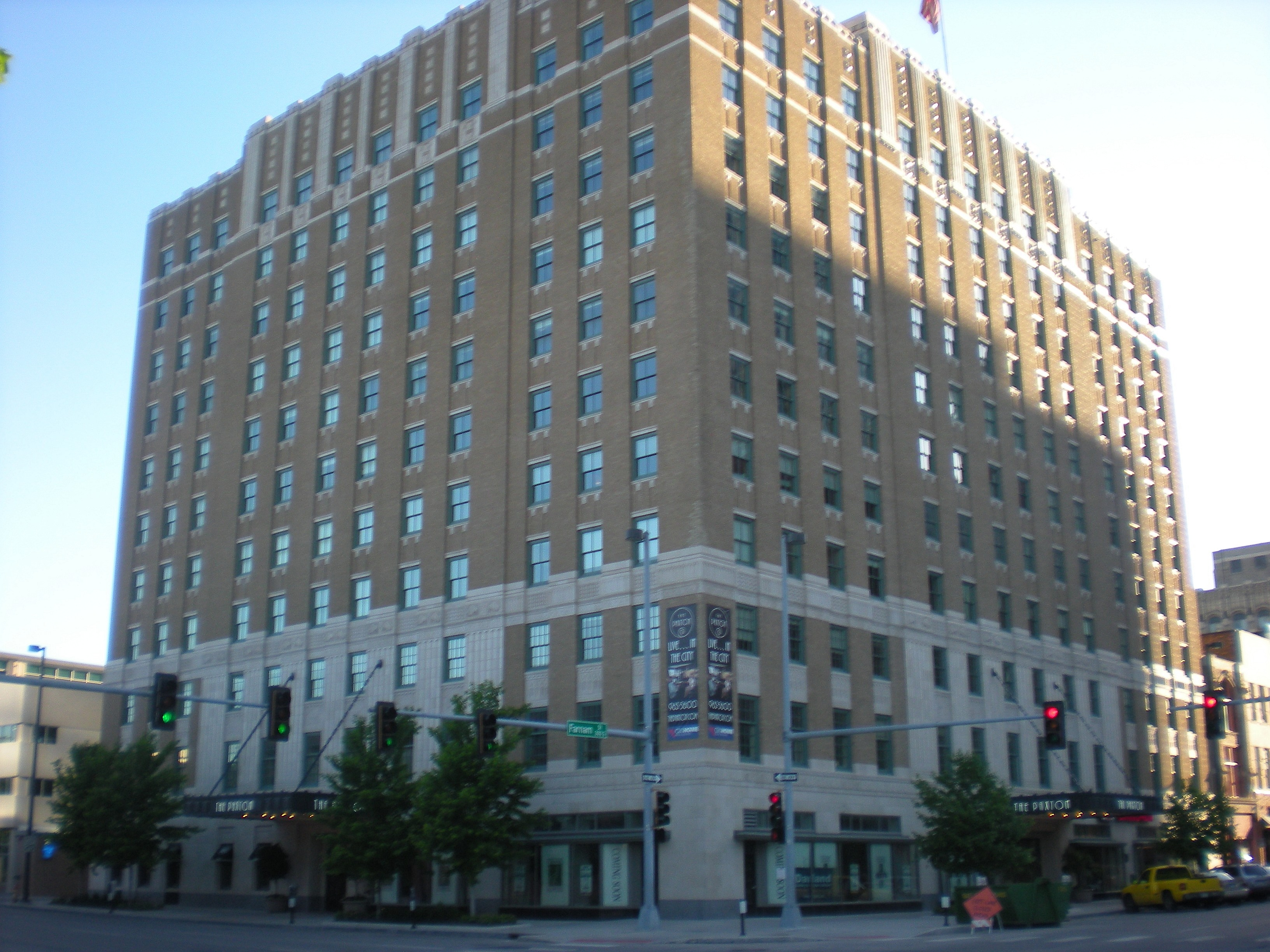
- The Paxton
- Interactive map of the Paxton Hotel area

General information
- Architectural style: Art Deco
- Location: Omaha, Nebraska, United States
- Coordinates: 41°15′26″N 95°56′06″W
- Construction started: 1882, 1927
- Completed: 1882, 1928
- Demolished: 1927, n/a
- Cost: $250,000, $1,000,000
- Client: Kitchen Brothers

The Paxton Hotel, formerly known as Paxton Manor and currently known as The Paxton, is located at 1403 Farnam Street in Downtown Omaha, Nebraska, United States. Designed by local architect Joseph G. McArthur, the current building was constructed in 1928, with its predecessor dating from 1882. Named for local businessman and community leader William A. Paxton, today the building houses luxury condominia. It is one of the few significant Art Deco structures in Omaha today. Among some of the prominent guests who stayed at the Paxton were Buffalo Bill Cody and William Jennings Bryan, as well as President William McKinley stayed at the Paxton (the original building) during the Trans-Mississippi Exposition in 1898.

== Original building ==
The building is located on the site of pioneer Omaha's magnificent Grand Central Hotel, which burnt down in 1878. Brothers C.W., W.T. and J.B. Kitchen built the original Paxton Hotel in 1882 to replace it, spending $250,000. The building contained 175 rooms, including an elegant dining room and a bar. The Kitchen Brothers ran several hotels throughout the Western United States, with one operating the Thornburg House in Laramie City, the Maxwell House at Rawlins, the Desert House in Green River and the Mountain Trout House at Evanston, all in the Wyoming Territory. Another ran the Pacific Hotel in St. Joseph, Missouri and the third operated the Paxton, as well as the Withnell House in Omaha.

The Omaha building was named the Paxton after William A. Paxton, an Omaha pioneer who lived at the hotel soon after it was built. He reportedly donated five thousand dollars to add a fifth story to the structure. Other notable residents included General George Crook, as well as prominent Omaha families including the J. L. Brandeises and Emil Brandeis, the Baums, the Wilhelms, and the Hanscoms. Woodmen of the World was founded at the hotel in 1890. The hotel was the site of one of Omaha's grand "live" signs of the day, which was a Krug Brewing Company advertisement featuring a 20-foot (6.1 m) wide by 34-foot (10 m) tall beer stein with a Luxus logo.

In the early 1900s the hotel was the site of the murder of Harry King, a son of the millionaire owner of Browning, King & Co. men's apparel store in Omaha. King's mistress, Elizabeth Bechler, fired two shots at him as he walked away from her in the hotel lobby. William Jennings Bryan addressed Omaha's Jacksononian Club at the hotel in 1900, and stayed there for several nights. That same year the hotel hosted Maud Gonne, an Irish revolutionary, feminist and actress. President McKinley was a guest during the Trans-Mississippi and International Exposition in 1898. In the United States presidential election of 1912 the Paxton housed the Progressive, Democratic and Republican parties, with dignitaries including Presidents Woodrow Wilson and Theodore Roosevelt registering as guests. Other steady customers were Buffalo Bill and prizefighter Bob Fitzsimmons.

The original building was demolished in 1927.

== Current building ==
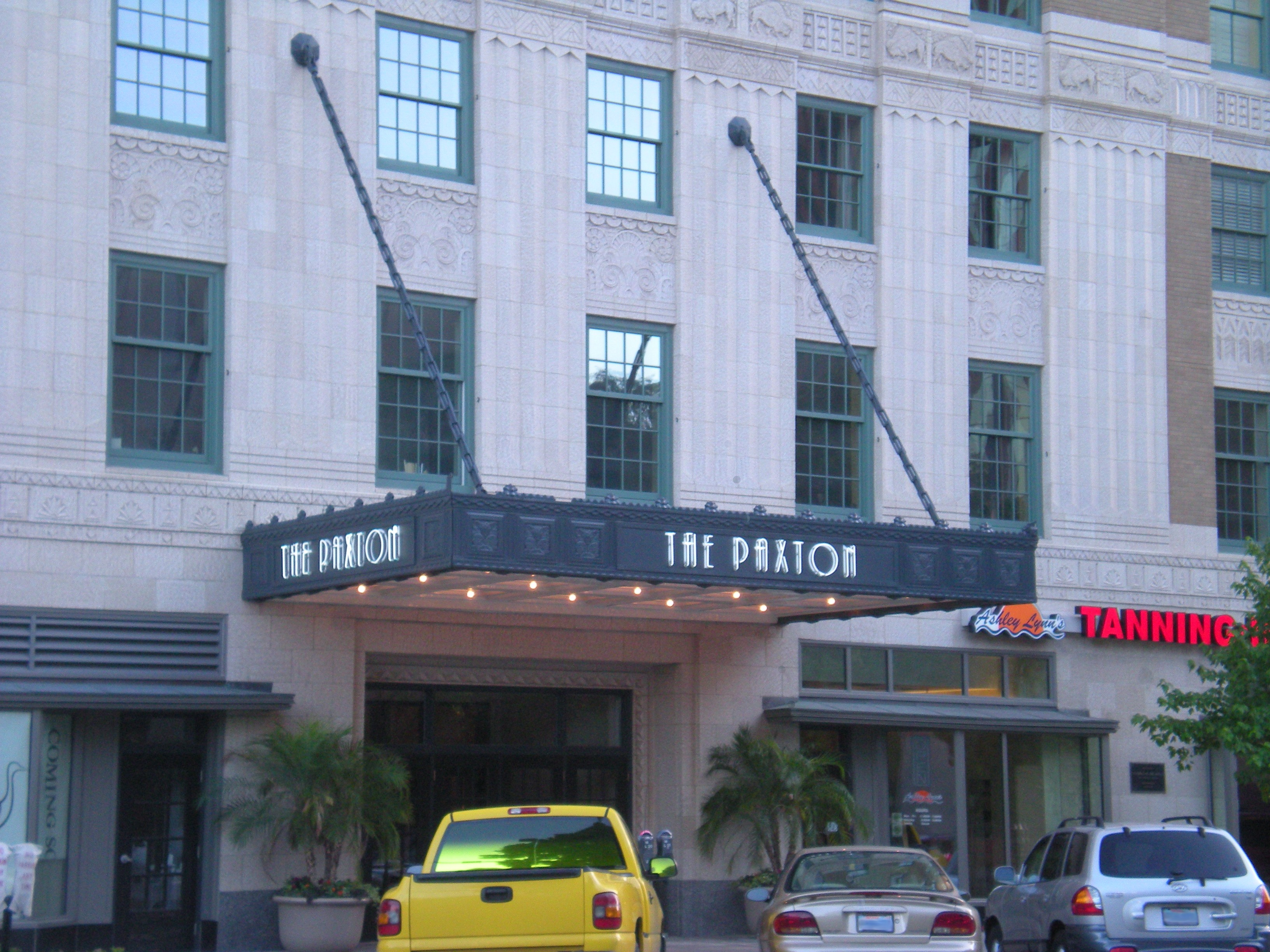
The north entrance to The Paxton.

In 1928 the new Paxton Hotel opened after eight months construction that cost $1.5 million. The Kitchen brothers commissioned the new building in the Art Deco style, with 420 rooms on 11 stories on a steel frame that measured 151 feet (46 m) by 132 feet (40 m). It opened for business on June 26, 1929. With interior design by Marshall, Field and Company of Chicago, features included four dining rooms, a barbershop and a ballroom, along with amenities including elevators, telegraph and cable services, and a rooftop dog kennel with runways. Room rates started at $2.50 a night.

The Kitchen brothers sold the Paxton to Joseph Huckins III in 1930, with the sale was regarded as the largest real estate deal ever to take place in Omaha at that time. Throughout the rest of the history of the hotel several notable events were held there. National radio broadcasts during the 1930s and 40s featured the hotel's in-house big band, the Paul Moorhead orchestra. The first annual convention of the Missouri Valley Association of Fire Chiefs was held at the Paxton in 1935. The first Omaha Magical Society Conclave was held at the hotel in 1941. The Nebraska Women's Press Club was founded in 1946 at a gathering of newspaper women. In 1950 the College World Series was held in Omaha for the first time, with teams staying at the Paxton throughout the duration. In 1954 the hotel hosted 400 people to view the first-ever color television broadcast in the United States.

The hotel closed in 1964, and from 1966 to 1969 the building was leased to the Federal Women's Job Corps as a residential facility. After sitting empty for two years it was rehabilitated and opened again as a hotel in 1971. It was decorated in a traditional Mediterranean style featuring carpeting on all floors and smoked glass mirrors on the lobby walls. The entirety of the building was refurbished. However, the hotel lasted for only a few years because of a high vacancy rate. In the late 1970s it was again rehabilitated, this time being converted into a senior housing, which lasted for almost 25 years, until the facility was closed in 2000.

After sitting empty for three years, in 2003 the building was rehabilitated, and in 2004 opened as The Paxton with high-end condominia.

The steakhouse 801 Chophouse occupies part of the ground floor.

== See also ==
- History of Omaha
