= Paxton Township =

Paxton Township may refer to:

- Paxton Township, Redwood County, Minnesota, US
- Paxton Township, Ross County, Ohio, US
- Paxton Township, Ontario, Canada; see List of townships in Ontario#Nipissing District

== See also ==
- Lower Paxton Township, Pennsylvania
- Middle Paxton Township, Pennsylvania
- Upper Paxton Township, Pennsylvania
- Paxton (disambiguation)
