= Paxton =

Paxton may refer to:

== People and fictional characters ==
- Paxton (name), a list of people and fictional characters with either the surname or given name
- Senator Paxton (disambiguation)

== Places ==
- Paxton High School (disambiguation)
- Paxton House (disambiguation)
- Paxton Township (disambiguation)

=== Australia ===
- Paxton, New South Wales

=== United Kingdom ===
- Paxton, Scottish Borders

=== United States ===
- Paxton, California
- Paxton, Florida
- Paxton, Illinois
- Paxton, Indiana
- Paxton, Massachusetts
- Paxton, Michigan
- Paxton, Nebraska
- Paxton, West Virginia
- Paxton Township, Minnesota
- Paxton Township, Ross County, Ohio
- Paxton Creek, a tributary of the Susquehanna River in Pennsylvania

== Businesses ==
- Paxton Automotive, an American manufacturer of automotive superchargers
- Paxton Hotel, formerly Paxton Manor and currently The Paxton, in Downtown Omaha, Nebraska, U.S.
- Paxton Media Group, an American media company

== Other uses ==
- Paxton (fish), a genus of fish from the family Apogonidae
- Paxton (soil), the state soil of Massachusetts
- Paxton man-powered aircraft, a British sporting human-powered aircraft

== See also ==
- Great Paxton, England
- Little Paxton, England
- Paxton House, Berwickshire, Scotland
- Paxton's Tower, near the National Botanic Garden of Wales in Carmarthenshire, Wales
- Lower Paxton Township, Pennsylvania
- Middle Paxton Township, Pennsylvania
- Upper Paxton Township, Pennsylvania
- Paxson (disambiguation)
- Paxon (disambiguation)
- Pax (disambiguation)
