= Omaha Driving Park =

Sports venue in Nebraska, United States

Coordinates: 41.2960°N 95.9400°W

The Omaha Driving Park, later called Sunset Driving Park, was located in North Omaha, Nebraska, United States. It was an important recreational and sports venue in the history of Omaha.

== History ==
In 1875, the Omaha Driving Park Association purchased a parcel of land located between Laird and Boyd Streets, and 16th to 20th Streets for horse racing. A fair association leased it, added some features. The Douglas County Fair had been held on the site since 1858. In 1880 the grounds were sold to a group of businessmen that included John Creighton, James E. Boyd and William A. Paxton. The new owners spent $15,000 to improve the grounds, and for several years after this the Nebraska State Fair was sporadically held here.

The Park hosted Buffalo Bill's first official performance of the Wild West Show on May 19, 1883. 8,000 people attended the premiere, and in 1898 the Park featured a local wild west show as part of the Trans-Mississippi Exposition. The Park fell into disuse by 1899. It was renamed as Sunset Driving Park in 1904, and sponsored races in which Barney Oldfield and Alonzo Webb beat world records for speed. Auto racing events were held there through 1908.

By 1910 Sunset Driving Park had relocated west of the city and was eventually renamed the Sunset Speedway. The old driving park on Sprague Street was broken up into 100 lots and offered for sale for residential purposes. The driving park was the last unoccupied part of the Kountze Place suburb.

== See also ==
- History of North Omaha, Nebraska
