= Paxson (surname) =

Paxson is a surname. Notable people with the surname include:

- Bud Paxson (1935–2015), American media executive
- Diana Paxson, American writer
- Edgar Samuel Paxson (1852–1919), American painter
- Frederic L. Paxson (1877–1948), Pulitzer Prize-winning historian
- James M. Paxson (died 1995), American businessman
- Jim Paxson (born 1957), American former professional basketball player and executive
- John Paxson (born 1960), American former professional basketball player and current executive, and the brother of Jim
- Melanie Paxson (born 1972), American actress
- Scott Paxson (born 1983), American football player
- Vern Paxson, Professor of Computer Science at the University of California, Berkeley
