= Carter Lake (Nova Scotia) =

Lake in Nova Scotia, Canada

- Location within Nova Scotia
- Location: Halifax Regional Municipality, Nova Scotia
- Coordinates: 45°31′51″N 63°34′53″W
- Basin countries: Canada

Carter Lake is a lake of Halifax Regional Municipality, Nova Scotia, Canada.

== See also ==
- List of lakes in Nova Scotia
