= John Paxton (disambiguation) =

John Paxton (1911–1985) was an American screenwriter.

John Paxton may also refer to:

- John Paxton (cricketer) (1819–1868), English cricketer
- John Paxton Norman (1819–1871), English jurist
- J. F. Paxton (John Franklin; 1857–1936), Canadian ice hockey administrator
- John Paxton (footballer) (born 1890), English footballer
- John L. Paxton (1920–2011), father of Bill Paxton and occasional actor
- John Paxton (ichthyologist) (born 1938), United States-born Australian ichthyologist at the Australian Museum, Sydney
- John M. Paxton Jr. (born 1951), American Marine Corps general
