= John Randolph Tucker (judge) =

American judge and politician

J. Randolph Tucker
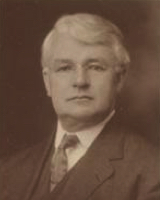

Judge of the United States District Court for the Territory of Alaska
- In office November 1, 1913 – November 1, 1917
- Appointed by: Woodrow Wilson
- Preceded by: Cornelius D. Murane
- Succeeded by: William A. Holzheimer

Member of the Virginia Senate from the 22nd district
- In office January 8, 1908 – October 25, 1913
- Preceded by: J. Lawrence Campbell
- Succeeded by: William T. Paxton

Personal details
- Born: John Randolph Tucker; August 13, 1854 Philadelphia, Pennsylvania
- Died: December 18, 1926 (aged 72) Bedford, Virginia
- Party: Democratic
- Spouse: Mary Singleton Hampton

John Randolph Tucker (August 13, 1854 – December 18, 1926) was an American judge and Democratic politician who served as a member of the Virginia Senate.

He was born in Philadelphia to Dr. David Hunter Tucker and the former Elizabeth Dallas. His father, son of Henry St. George Tucker, Sr., was then serving as Dean of the Medical College of Virginia.

He was sometimes referred to as "J. Randolph Tucker, Jr.," to distinguish him from his uncle, a U.S. congressman.

In 1913, Tucker was appointed by Woodrow Wilson to a four-year term on the federal bench in the Alaska territory. While there, Judge Tucker named the Wade Hampton Census Area in Alaska to commemorate his father-in-law, South Carolina politician Wade Hampton III. In 2015, after new attention was brought to Hampton's status as a Confederate general and ardent supporter of the Ku Klux Klan, the area was re-designated as the Kusilvak Census Area.

Senate of Virginia
Preceded by J. Lawrence Campbell	Virginia Senator for the 22nd District; 1908–1913	Succeeded by William T. Paxton
Legal offices
Preceded by Cornelius D. Murane	Judge of the U.S. District Court for the Territory of Alaska (2nd District: Nome); 1913–1917	Succeeded by William A. Holzheimer
