= James Paxton =

James Paxton may refer to:

- James Paxton (actor) (born 1994), American actor
- James Paxton (baseball) (born 1988), Canadian baseball player
- James Paxton (golfer) (1831–?), Scottish golfer
- James Paxton (surgeon) (1786–1860), British surgeon
