= Carter Lake (Vancouver Island) =

Lake in British Columbia, Canada

- Location within Vancouver Island
- Location: Vancouver Island, British Columbia
- Coordinates: 49°37′27.0″N 125°42′38.6″W
- Lake type: Natural lake
- Basin countries: Canada

Carter Lake is a lake located on Vancouver Island south of Schjelderup Lake and south east of Golden Hinde in Strathcona Provincial Park.

== See also ==
- List of lakes of British Columbia
