= William T. Paxton =

American politician

Member of the Virginia Senate from the 22nd district
- In office January 14, 1914 – January 12, 1916
- Preceded by: J. Randolph Tucker
- Succeeded by: A. Willis Robertson

Personal details
- Born: William Thomas Paxton; August 3, 1869 Rockbridge, Virginia, U.S.
- Died: June 19, 1942 (aged 72) Buena Vista, Virginia, U.S.
- Party: Democratic
- Spouse: Charlotte Powell

William Thomas Paxton (August 3, 1869 – June 19, 1942) was an American Democratic politician who served as a member of the Virginia Senate from 1914 to 1916.

Senate of Virginia
| Preceded by J.Randolph Tucker | Virginia Senator for the 22nd District; 1914–1916 | Succeeded by A. Willis Robertson |
