= Sir Thomas Paxton, 1st Baronet =

Scottish politician

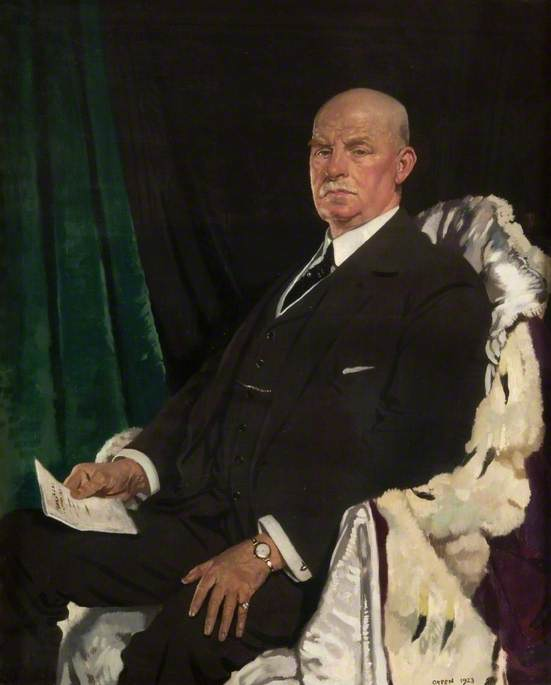
Image of Sir Thomas Paxton

Sir Thomas Paxton, 1st Baronet (9 May 1860 – 15 March 1930), was a Scottish politician.

Paxton was Lord Provost of Glasgow and Lord-Lieutenant of Glasgow between 1920 and 1923. He was created a baronet, of Letham in the Parish of Monimail in the County of Fife, in 1923. He declined to contest Glasgow Central in the 1923 general election.

Paxton died in March 1930, aged 69, when the baronetcy became extinct.

Political offices
| Preceded by Sir James Stewart | Lord Provost of Glasgow; 1920–1923 | Succeeded by Sir Matthew Walker Montgomery |
Honorary titles
| Preceded by Sir James Stewart | Lord-Lieutenant of Glasgow; 1920–1923 | Succeeded by Sir Matthew Walker Montgomery |
Baronetage of the United Kingdom
| New creation | Baronet (of Letham); 1923–1930 | Extinct |
