= Carter Lake (Iowa–Nebraska) =

Lake in Iowa and Nebraska, U.S.

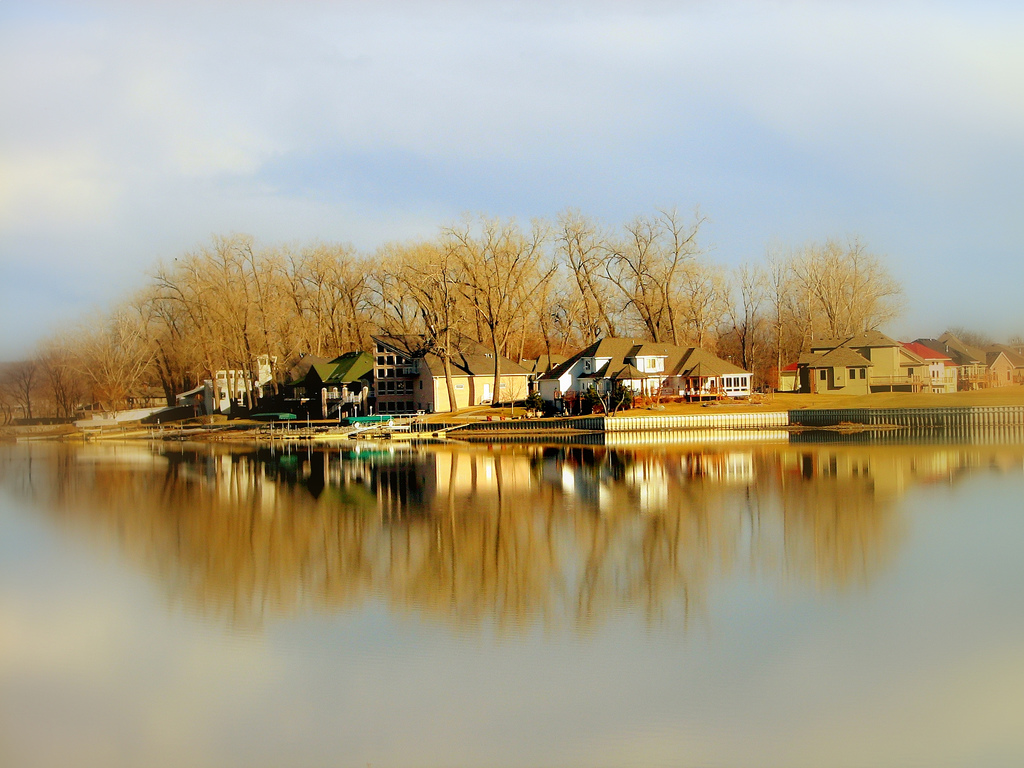
- Carter Lake, as viewed from Nebraska

- Location within Iowa Location within Nebraska Location within the United States
- Location: Omaha, Nebraska / Carter Lake, Iowa, United States
- Coordinates: 41°18′6.8″N 95°54′53.7″W
- Type: Oxbow lake
- Basin countries: United States
- Surface area: 315 acres (127 ha)
- Average depth: 6 ft (2 m)
- Max. depth: 24 ft (7 m)
- Surface elevation: 977 ft (298 m)
- Settlements: Carter Lake, Iowa; Omaha, Nebraska

Carter Lake is a shallow oxbow lake in Nebraska and Iowa, located next to Omaha, and marks one of the only spots the Iowa-Nebraska border is not on the Missouri River. Soon after its formation the lake was called the East Omaha Lake, and then Lake Nakoma. The city of Carter Lake, Iowa, takes its name from the lake. The lake was formed from the Saratoga Bend in the Missouri River.

== Overview ==
The lake has native black crappie, bluegill, channel catfish, common carp, green sunfish, and largemouth bass. The lake is irregularly stocked with channel catfish and northern pike. Invasive species in the lake include curlyleaf pondweed and Eurasian watermilfoil. There are limited restrictions on fishing in the lake.

There is one publicly available boat ramp, and boating is legal on the lake.

== History ==
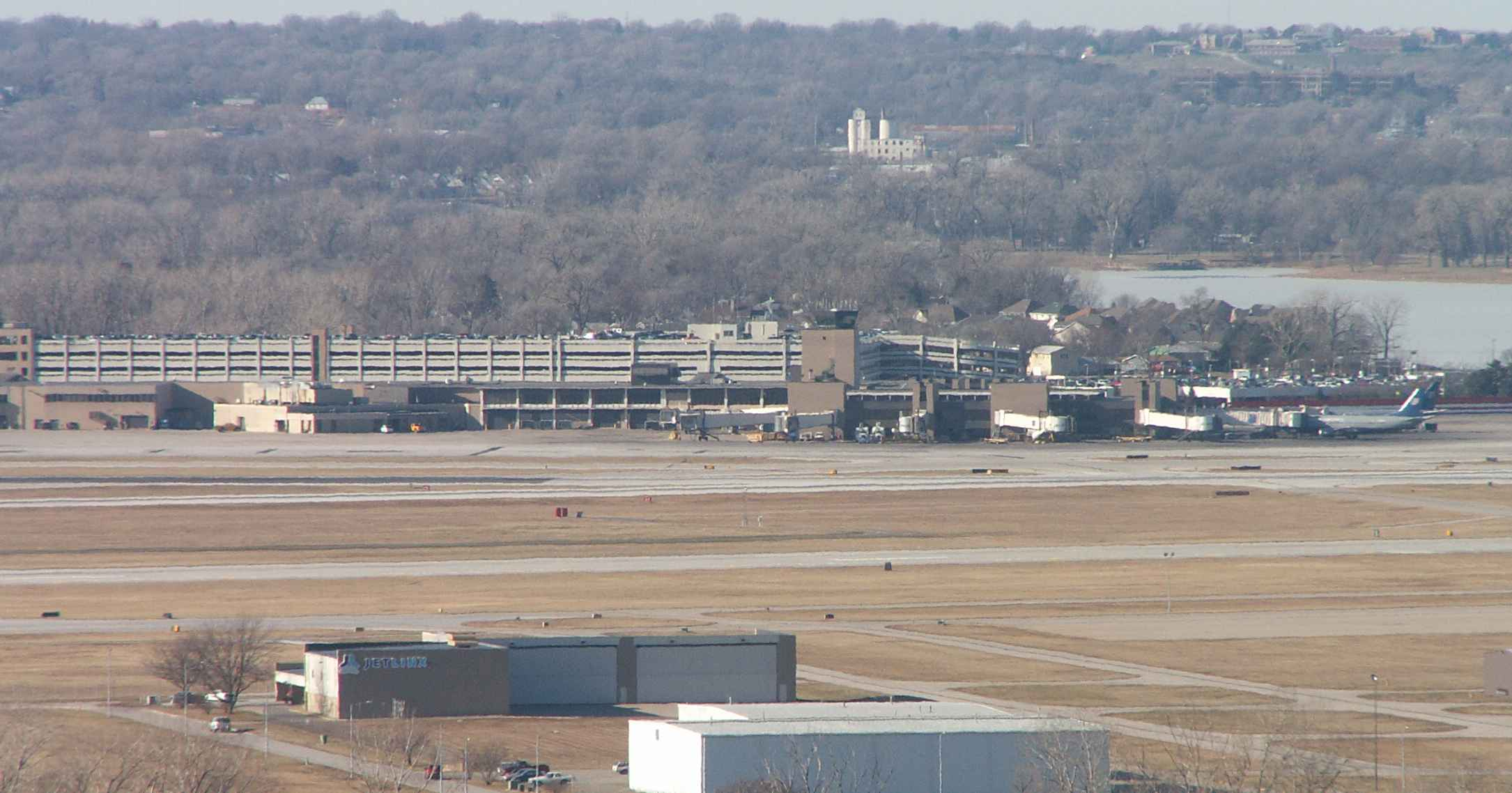
View of Eppley Airfield with Carter Lake visible to the right

The Saratoga Bend was the impetus for the creation of the town of Saratoga, Nebraska Territory, a short mile from the river. However, the Bend was cut off from the river after a flood and subsequent river reroute in 1877. Because of this change in the path of the river, the city of Carter Lake, which sits between the lake and the river, is the only city in Iowa to be west of the Missouri River.

A beach resort with a large boathouse and two-story pavilion, a Rod and Gun Club, and a YMCA camp had all settled on the shores of Lake Nakoma by 1906. The Carter Lake and Levi Carter Park at 3100 Abbott Drive were named after one of Omaha's original industrialists named Levi Carter, who ran a white lead smelter in the area.

== See also ==
- East Omaha, Nebraska
- Carter Lake, Iowa
- Saratoga, Nebraska Territory
- History of North Omaha, Nebraska
