= William A. Paxton =

American politician

- Born: January 26, 1837; Springfield, Kentucky
- Died: July 18, 1907 (aged 70); Omaha, Nebraska
- Occupations: Cattle, investment
- Known for: Businessman, politician

William A. Paxton (January 26, 1837 – July 18, 1907) was an American pioneer businessman and politician in Omaha, Nebraska. His life as a rancher and cattleman early in his life, as well as early work with the Union Pacific Railroad was highly regarded among his contemporaries; his success as a businessman later in his life led him to great wealth. His leadership is seen as an essential factor in Omaha becoming a prominent stockyards and meatpacking center. He is frequently referred to as "the real founder of South Omaha."

== Early life ==
Paxton was born in Springfield, Kentucky on January 26, 1837, and raised there until age twelve when his family moved to Missouri. Employed by a local farmer, by the age of fifteen he started his own business breaking prairie sod for new settlers in the area. Paxton worked as a farm manager until he was 25.

== Career ==
In 1862 Paxton went to Omaha and became the foreman of a bridge building crew on the Military Road between Omaha and Fort Kearny. Returning to Omaha in 1860 Paxton hauled freight between Omaha and Denver. The next year he worked for Edward Creighton's crew installing the Western Union Telegraph between Omaha and Denver. In 1865 he bought a team of horses from Creighton and started his own freighting business, operating between Omaha and Denver until 1867.

In 1867 the Union Pacific Railroad contracted with Paxton to grade the roadway west of Julesburg, Colorado. Working first as foreman of a crew hired to supply railroad ties, and then as manager of a large railroad construction gang, Paxton contracted with the Omaha and Northwestern Railroad in 1869 to build lines north out of Omaha to Oakland, Nebraska.

Paxton next bought cattle at Abilene, Kansas, and drove them to Omaha, where he sold them and used the money to go into ranching near Ogallala, Nebraska. Supplying beef to area Indian agencies for the next five years, Paxton operated the Keystone Cattle Company ranch at Ogallala and also owned ranches near Hyannis and Paxton, Nebraska, which was named for him. Paxton returned to Omaha in 1875, but did not sell his ranches until 1883.

In 1879 Paxton became a principal stockholder in the Nebraska Telephone Company. That same year he helped organize the Omaha Mashers, a baseball team in the short-lived Northwestern League. In 1882, he was the vice-president of the Omaha Savings Bank. The same year, in partnership with Ben Gallagher, he organized the Paxton and Gallagher Wholesale Grocery firm. Paxton was one of the organizers of the Paxton-Vierling Iron Works in 1885, and was part of the Omaha Driving Association, which in 1880 purchased and developed a tract of land in North Omaha called the Omaha Driving Park. It became the site of the Nebraska State Fair for several years. In 1882 Paxton gave $5,000 to local hotel developers to encourage them to consider adding a fifth story to their new building and naming the hotel in his honor. The Paxton Hotel was Omaha's premier hotel for many years.

=== Omaha Stockyards ===
In 1878 Paxton helped form the first Union Stockyards Company in Omaha, but soon afterwards it was moved to Council Bluffs, Iowa. The Union Stockyards Company was reorganized in South Omaha in 1883, and Paxton was the first president of the corporation. He was also instrumental in organizing related businesses, including the Union Stockyards Bank of South Omaha, the South Omaha Terminal Railway, the Union Elevator, the Union Trust Company, and the South Omaha Land Company, of which he was vice-president.

=== Politics ===
Paxton was elected to the Nebraska Legislature in 1881 and served in the Nebraska Senate in 1889.

== Legacy ==
William A. Paxton's name was given to the Paxton Block of office buildings which he constructed at South 16th and Farnam Streets in Downtown Omaha; the Paxton Hotel which he assisted with financial help, and; Paxton Boulevard in South Omaha. He also built Omaha's Ware Block, which is named for his wife, Mary Jane Ware, the Granite Block, and the old Merchants Hotel in Omaha.

The town of Paxton, Nebraska was named for him, as well. Located near there was a town called Keystone, Nebraska, named after Paxton's brand; the neighborhood in Omaha called Keystone is also named for Paxton's brand.

The Paxton and Gallagher Wholesale Grocery firm was sold to Gilbert C. Swanson and W. Clarke Swanson and renamed Butternut Foods in 1958. In 1963, Paxton was inducted into the Hall of Great Westerners of the National Cowboy & Western Heritage Museum.

== See also ==
- History of Omaha, Nebraska
