= Trans-Mississippi Exposition =

World's fair held in Omaha, Nebraska

Trans-Mississippi and International Exposition
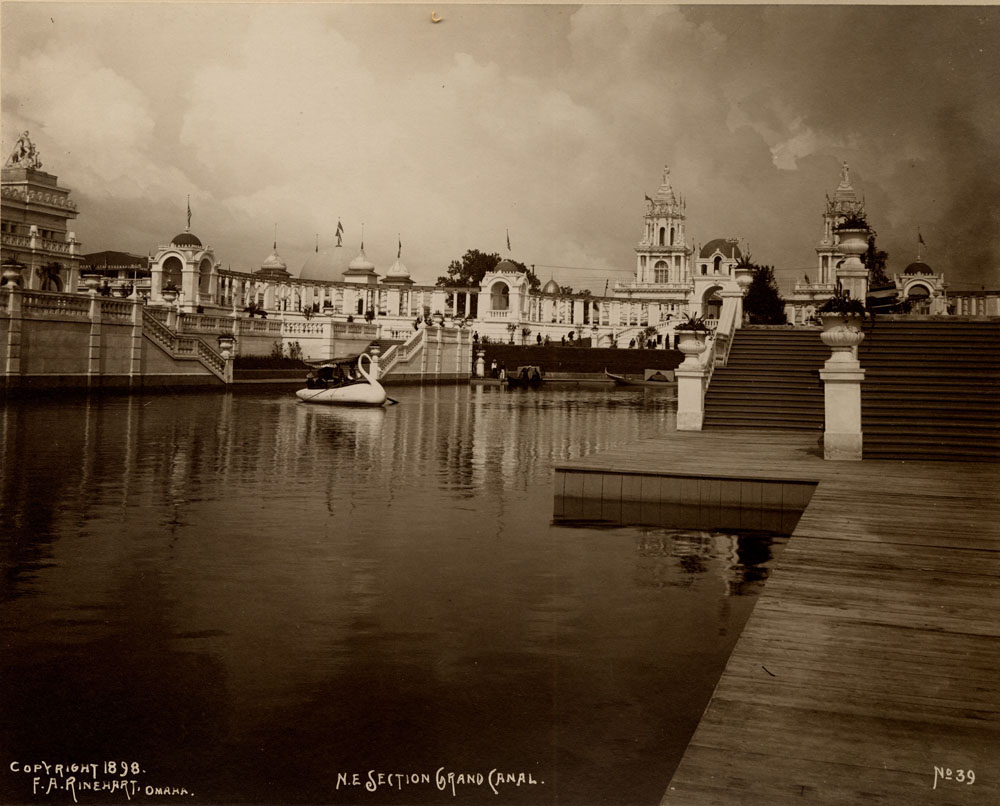
- East portion of Lagoon. Gondolas and Swan Boat with passengers. Machinery & Electricity Building, Twin Tower Restaurants, and Colonnade visible to the northeast

Overview
- BIE-class: Unrecognized exposition
- Name: Trans-Mississippi and International Exposition
- Area: 180-acre
- Visitors: 2,613,508

Location
- Country: United States of America
- City: Omaha
- Venue: Kountze Park
- Coordinates: 41°17′29″N 95°56′21″W

Timeline
- Opening: June 1, 1898
- Closure: November 1, 1898

The Trans-Mississippi and International Exposition was a world's fair held in Omaha, Nebraska, from June 1 to November 1, 1898. Its goal was to showcase the development of the entire West from the Mississippi River to the Pacific Coast. The Indian Congress was held concurrently. Over 2.6 million people came to Omaha to view the 4,062 exhibits during the five months of the Exposition. President William McKinley and William Jennings Bryan were among the dignitaries who attended at the invitation of Gurdon Wattles, the event's leader. A hundred thousand people assembled on the plaza to hear them speak. The Expo stretched over a 180-acre (0.73 km^{2}) tract in North Omaha and featured a 2,000-foot-long (610 m) lagoon encircled by 21 classical buildings that featured fine and modern products from around the world.

One reporter wrote, "Perhaps the candid Nebraskan would tell you in a moment of frank contriteness that the prime object of this exposition was to boom Omaha."

== Timeline ==
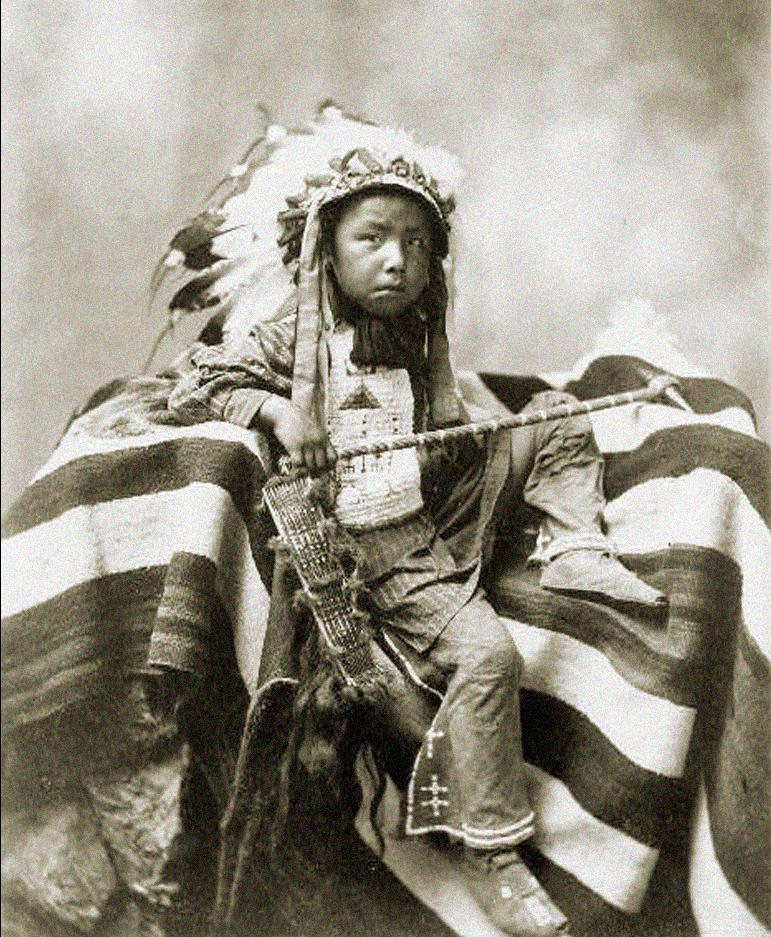
A young Sioux boy poses with a club while part of a "living display" at the Exposition

The decision to hold an exposition was made in late 1895 by a small committee of Omaha businessmen, led by banker Gurdon Wattles. In making their decision, the committee set aside several sites for consideration, including an area near 16th Avenue and Pershing Drive in East Omaha, near the now-dry Florence Lake. It was the preferred site for the Exposition early in 1897. 400 acres (1.6 km^{2}) surrounding the tract that became Miller Park was considered the strongest contender towards the middle of the year. However, both sites ended up losing out to a site in North Omaha later in the year when Omaha banker Herman Kountze donated land in his Kountze Place development to the City of Omaha. After the Expo some of that land would become Kountze Park.

Many important developments happened throughout the city before the opening of the Trans-Mississippi Exposition. They included the opening of the Burlington Train Station in downtown Omaha.

During the Expo, on August 31, 1898, the committee declared "Cody Day" in honor of Buffalo Bill Cody. Cody brought his "world-famous" Wild West Show back to the Omaha Driving Park where it was formally founded several years earlier.

October 12 was "President's Day" at the Expo and featured a speech by President William McKinley focused on international affairs and the necessity of not being isolationist.

The total attendance was 2,613,508, and the total receipts were $1,924,077. The following year after the Expo some members of its managing committee decided to host another Expo-type event, which became the Great American Exposition in summer 1899.

== Construction ==
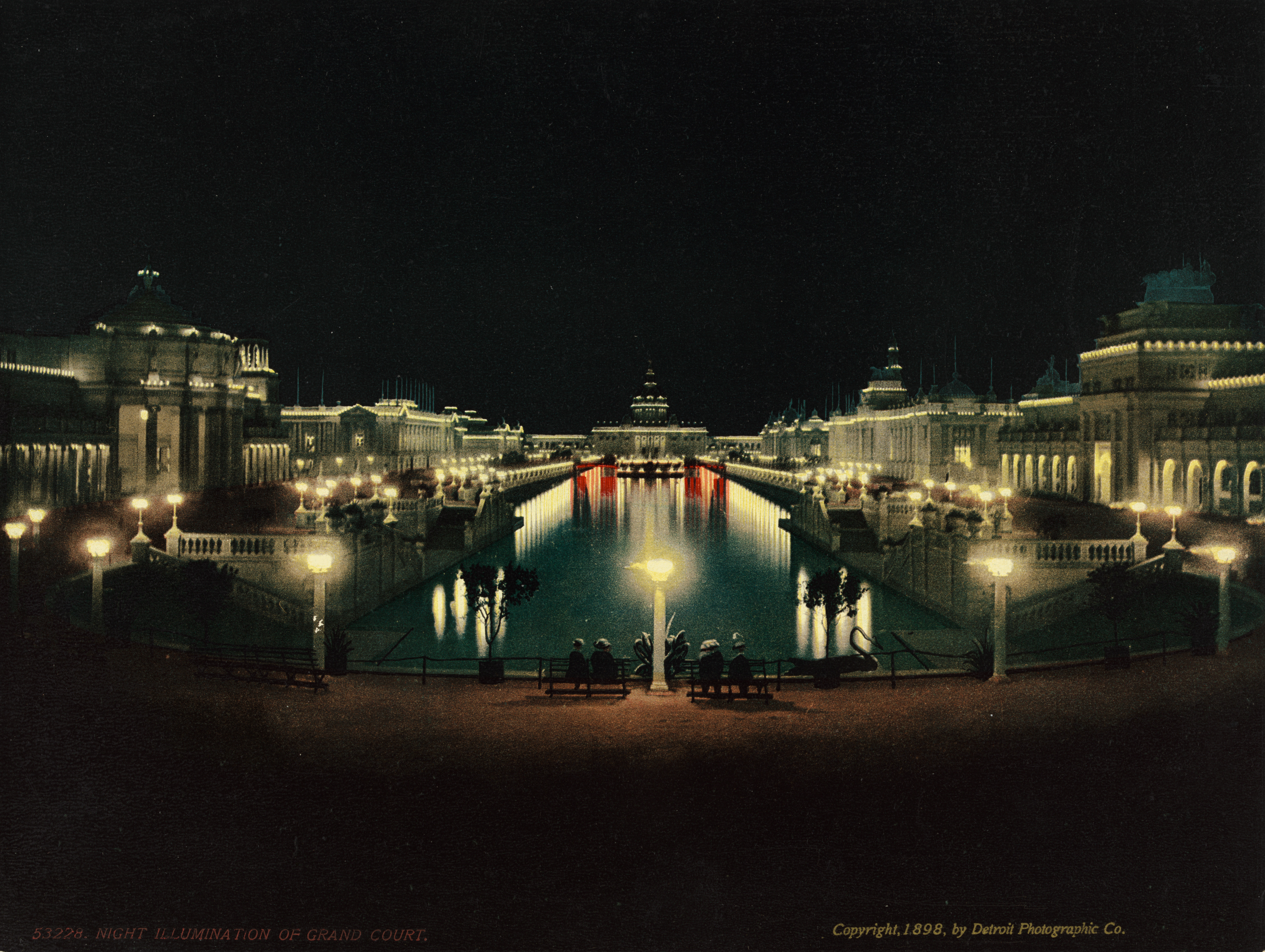
Night illumination, Grand Court, Trans-Mississippi and International Exposition, Omaha, Nebraska, 1898

Many temporary buildings, structures, and features were installed for the Exposition. Thomas Rogers Kimball and C. Howard Walker were named co-architects-in-chief for the event. The two men were responsible for the overall site development, including perimeter buildings. They designed several major buildings, some smaller structures and the Arch of States, which was a main entrance.

All these structures were temporary by design, built at about half the cost of permanent buildings. The lower cost allowed the construction of larger structures. The construction of the hundreds of temporary buildings at the Expo was notable because of the almost exclusive usage of a new, cheap and pliable building material called staff. It allowed Expo designers to construct visual reproductions of Grecian and Roman temples, fine European buildings, and more. The buildings were constructed of strips of wood covered with staff.

The Grand Court of the 1898 Trans-Mississippi Exposition was located on the current site of Kountze Park.

== Commemoration ==
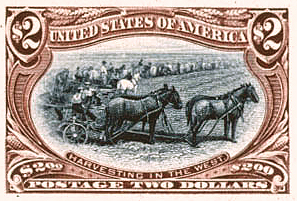
Bi-color essay for the $2 stamp (note: the Harvesting in the West vignette was ultimately reassigned to the 2¢ stamp and retitled "Farming in the West").

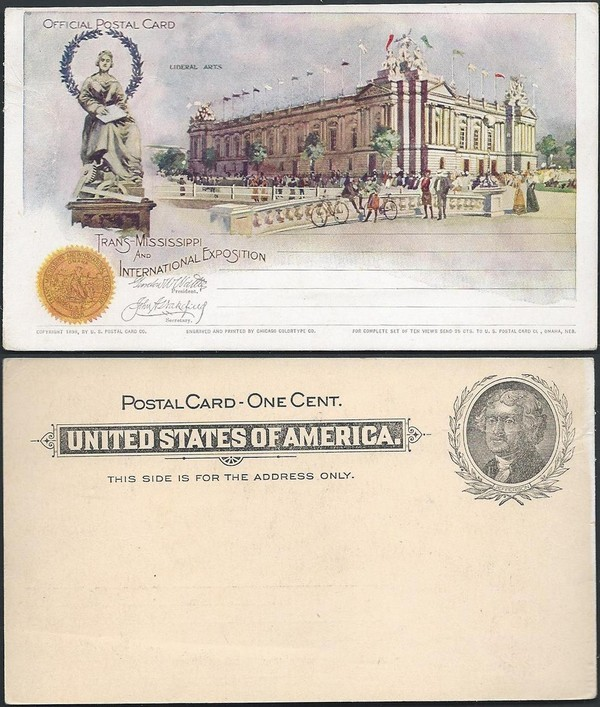
US 1898 1¢ postal card for the Trans-Mississippi Exposition

The Post Office Department issued a series of nine postage stamps to mark the Exposition, each depicting a Western scene. Now known as the Trans-Mississippi Issue and considered among the finest stamps produced by the US, they are highly prized by collectors; a complete unused set is worth about US$5,000. The stamps were reissued in 1998 for a limited time. 1¢ postal cards were also issued.

A monument to the exposition was placed in Omaha's Kountze Park, the former site of the exposition, during a Centennial celebration of the Trans-Mississippi and International Exposition in 1998.

== See also ==
- Richard Bock - World-famous sculptor who designed several buildings at the Expo.
