= Carter Lake, Iowa =

City in Iowa, USA

- City
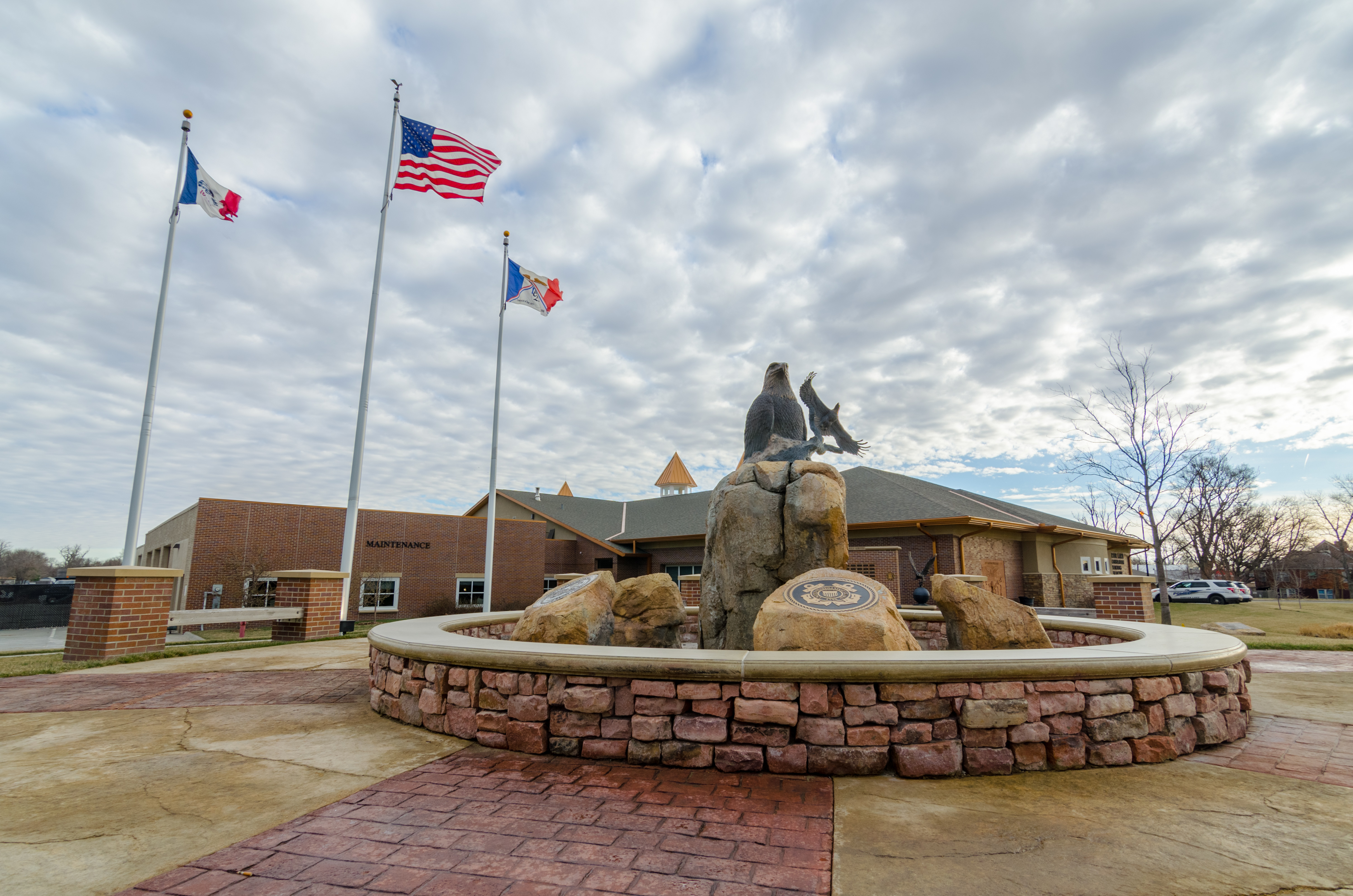
- City Office Building in Carter Lake, Iowa

- Flag

- Location of Carter Lake, Iowa

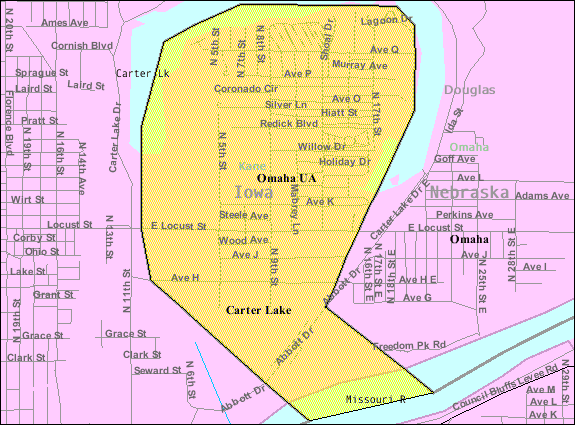
- U.S. Census Map
- Coordinates: 41°17′18″N 95°55′01″W
- Country: USA
- State: Iowa
- County: Pottawattamie

Government
  - Type: Mayor-council

Area
  - Total: 2.02 sq mi (5.23 km^{2})
  - Land: 1.80 sq mi (4.65 km^{2})
  - Water: 0.22 sq mi (0.58 km^{2})
- Elevation: 974 ft (297 m)

Population (2020)
  - Total: 3,791
  - Density: 2,112.7/sq mi (815.71/km^{2})
- Time zone: UTC-6 (Central (CST))
  - Summer (DST): UTC-5 (CDT)
- ZIP code: 51510
- Area code: 712
- FIPS code: 19-11215
- GNIS feature ID: 2393756
- Website: www.cityofcarterlake.com

Carter Lake is a city in Pottawattamie County, Iowa, United States. A suburb of Omaha, Nebraska, it sits surrounding the south and west sides of the region's major airport, Eppley Airfield. It is separated from the rest of Iowa by the Missouri River, effectively making it an exclave. The population was 3,791 at the 2020 census.

== History ==
Carter Lake is an example of the border irregularities of the United States, being the only city in Iowa located west of the Missouri River. A flood redirected the course of the river 1.25 mi (2 km) to the southeast in March 1877. The remnants of the old river course, called Saratoga Bend, became an oxbow lake, named Carter Lake. Soon after the formation of the lake, the site became a flourishing recreational area. It included "a boathouse at the foot of Locust street, hotels and club houses were numerous and the lake was the scene of many a pleasant rowing and fishing party."

After extensive litigation between Iowa and Nebraska, the Supreme Court of the United States ruled in 1892 that Carter Lake belonged to Iowa in Nebraska v. Iowa, 143 U.S. 359 (1892). Although the general rule is that state boundaries follow gradual changes in the course of a river, the Court ruled that an exception exists when a river avulses one of its bends. The Supreme Court made another ruling on the circumstances of Carter Lake in 1972 when it ruled on a boundary dispute between the two states in Nebraska v. Iowa, 406 U.S. 117 (1972).

Although Carter Lake was legally considered part of Council Bluffs and residents paid city taxes, they lacked the basic city services enjoyed by residents east of the Missouri River. The community successfully seceded from Council Bluffs in the 1920s, intending to become part of Omaha, Nebraska. However, Omaha did not want to pay to extend sewers or water lines. Consequently, Carter Lake incorporated as a city in the state of Iowa on July 2, 1930.

Two separate amusement parks were located in Carter Lake early on: the Courtland Beach Amusement Park from 1905 to 1917, and the Lakeview Amusement Park from 1917 to 1933. The Munchoff Brothers, who were the original operators of Omaha's Krug Park, ran both parks; they moved rides from Courtland to Lakeview in 1917. One of the brothers donated the rides from the old parks to the World War II metal drives in 1945.

The city became a gambling hot spot in the 1930s and '40s, as law enforcement was limited and because of its important location. At The Chez Paree, you "could listen to Sophie Tucker, have the best prime rib in town and enjoy a gambling raid or two." Patrons could "bet on any horse race in the United States," and the business was described as "the most active casino between Chicago and the West Coast."

The mistaken belief that a defendant corporation located in Carter Lake was a legal resident of Nebraska resulted in another U.S. Supreme Court case, Owen Equipment & Erection Co. v. Kroger, 437 U.S. 365 (1978). The case clarified the law regarding ancillary jurisdiction, which allows claims based on state law to be heard in a federal court when related to a claim based on federal law.

== Geography ==
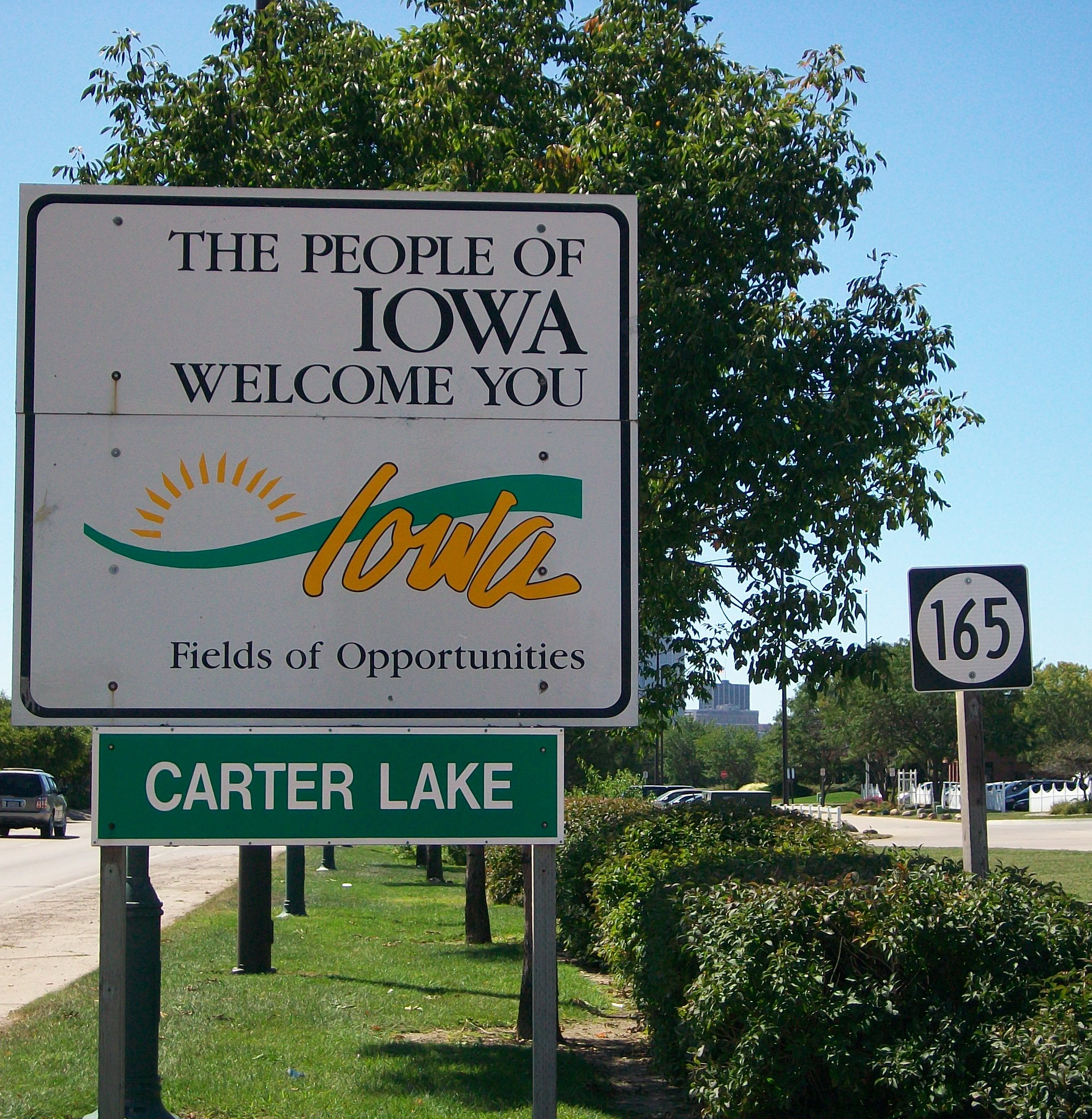
Iowa welcome sign on Abbott Drive (Iowa Highway 165), the main road between downtown Omaha and Eppley Airfield

The city is surrounded on three sides by Omaha, Nebraska, and on the fourth by the Missouri River.

According to the United States Census Bureau, the city has a total area of 2.02 square miles (5.23 km^{2}), of which 1.87 square miles (4.84 km^{2}) is land and 0.15 square miles (0.39 km^{2}) is water.

Carter Lake creates a geographic oddity for travelers going to Eppley Airfield, which it surrounds on the south and west. Consequently, travelers going to Eppley Airfield from anywhere except North Omaha will go through Carter Lake, Iowa. It has reportedly caused confusion when unfamiliar travelers see a "Welcome to Iowa" sign on their way to and from the airport.

== Demographics ==
Historical populations
Year	Pop.	±%
1940	846	—
1950	1,183	+39.8%
1960	2,287	+93.3%
1970	3,268	+42.9%
1980	3,438	+5.2%
1990	3,200	−6.9%
2000	3,248	+1.5%
2010	3,785	+16.5%
2020	3,791	+0.2%
Source:"U.S. Census website". United States Census Bureau. and Iowa Data Center; Source: U.S. Decennial Census

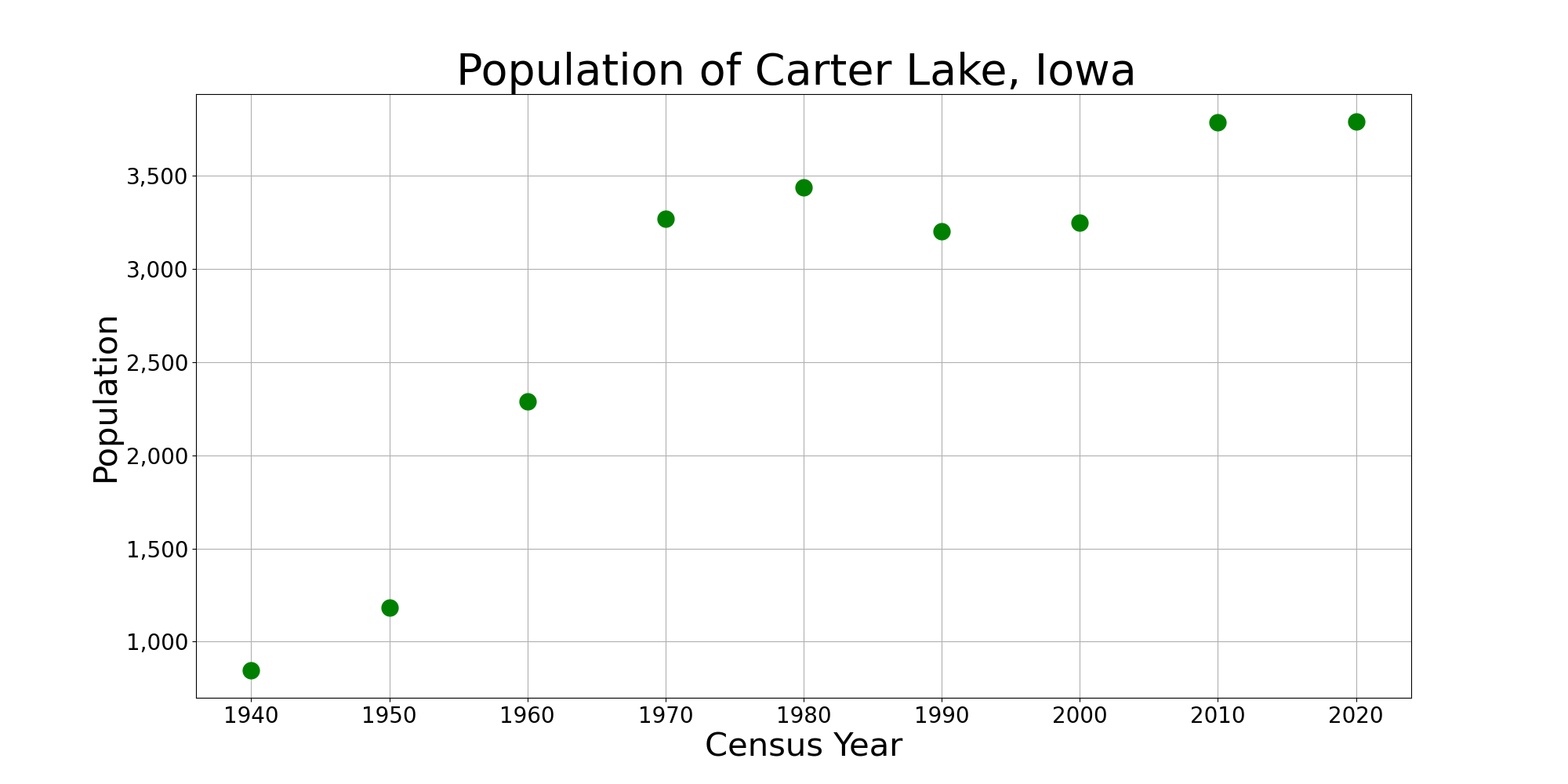
The population of Carter Lake, Iowa from US census data

=== 2020 census ===
As of the 2020 census, there were 3,791 people, 1,438 households, and 996 families residing in the city. The population density was 2,112.7 inhabitants per square mile (815.7/km^{2}). There were 1,512 housing units at an average density of 842.6 per square mile (325.3/km^{2}).

The median age was 37.9 years. 26.5% of residents were under the age of 18 and 14.3% of residents were 65 years of age or older. 29.0% of residents were under the age of 20; 5.5% were between the ages of 20 and 24; 24.5% were from 25 to 44; and 26.8% were from 45 to 64. For every 100 females there were 93.9 males, and for every 100 females age 18 and over there were 94.8 males age 18 and over. The gender makeup of the city was 48.4% male and 51.6% female.

100.0% of residents lived in urban areas, while 0.0% lived in rural areas.

Of all households, 32.0% had children under the age of 18 living in them. 43.8% were married-couple households, 9.2% were cohabiting-couple households, 20.0% were households with a male householder and no spouse or partner present, and 26.9% were households with a female householder and no spouse or partner present. 30.7% of all households were non-families. About 24.3% of all households were made up of individuals and 9.2% had someone living alone who was 65 years of age or older.

Of housing units, 4.9% were vacant. The homeowner vacancy rate was 1.3% and the rental vacancy rate was 5.8%.

Racial composition as of the 2020 census
Race	Number	Percent
White	3,177	83.8%
Black or African American	89	2.3%
American Indian and Alaska Native	35	0.9%
Asian	23	0.6%
Native Hawaiian and Other Pacific Islander	0	0.0%
Some other race	228	6.0%
Two or more races	239	6.3%
Hispanic or Latino (of any race)	409	10.8%

=== 2010 census ===
As of the census of 2010, there were 3,785 people, 1,388 households, and 997 families residing in the city. The population density was 2,024.1 inhabitants per square mile (781.5/km^{2}). There were 1,481 housing units at an average density of 792.0 per square mile (305.8/km^{2}). The racial makeup of the city was 90.3% White, 1.0% African American, 0.8% Native American, 0.5% Asian, 5.8% from other races, and 1.6% from two or more races. Hispanic or Latino of any race were 11.5% of the population.

There were 1,388 households, of which 37.4% had children under the age of 18 living with them, 46.5% were married couples living together, 17.9% had a female householder with no husband present, 7.4% had a male householder with no wife present, and 28.2% were non-families. 22.3% of all households were made up of individuals, and 8.2% had someone living alone who was 65 years of age or older. The average household size was 2.73 and the average family size was 3.16.

The median age in the city was 36.1 years. 28.3% of residents were under the age of 18; 8.3% were between the ages of 18 and 24; 25.1% were from 25 to 44; 25.5% were from 45 to 64; and 12.8% were 65 years of age or older. The gender makeup of the city was 49.4% male and 50.6% female.

=== 2000 census ===
As of the census of 2000, there were 3,248 people, 1,221 households, and 914 families residing in the city. The population density was 1,799.7 inhabitants per square mile (694.9/km^{2}). There were 1,292 housing units at an average density of 715.9 per square mile (276.4/km^{2}). The racial makeup of the city was 96.71% White, 0.25% African American, 0.74% Native American, 0.25% Asian, 0.86% from other races, and 1.20% from two or more races. 2.89% of the population were Hispanic or Latino of any race.

There were 1,221 households, out of which 32.3% had children under the age of 18 living with them, 55.4% were married couples living together, 13.3% had a female householder with no husband present, and 25.1% were non-families. 20.1% of all households were made up of individuals, and 7.5% had someone living alone who was 65 years of age or older. The average household size was 2.66 and the average family size was 3.04.

Age/gender breakdown: 25.9% under the age of 18, 8.0% from 18 to 24, 29.8% from 25 to 44, 24.3% from 45 to 64, and 12.0% who were 65 years of age or older. The median age was 37 years. For every 100 females, there were 100.1 males. For every 100 females age 18 and over, there were 94.4 males.

The median income for a household in the city was $37,851, and the median income for a family was $42,794. Males had a median income of $30,946 versus $23,309 for females. The per capita income for the city was $18,758. 7.1% of the population and 4.9% of families were below the poverty line. Out of the total population, 11.6% of those under the age of 18 and 2.9% of those 65 and older were living below the poverty line.

== See also ==
- Gambling in Omaha, Nebraska
- Kentucky Bend
