= Sherman Elementary School =

Location
- 5618 North 14th Avenue; Omaha, Nebraska 68111; United States
- Coordinates: 41°18′36″N 95°56′07″W

Information
- Type: Public elementary school
- Established: 1888
- School district: Omaha Public Schools
- Grades: Pre-K–6
- Website: Sherman Elementary School

Sherman Elementary School is located at 5618 North 14th Avenue in East Omaha, Nebraska, United States. Founded in 1888 at 16th and Jaynes Streets for 21 students, today Sherman is home to over 275 students in prekindergarten through sixth grade. The school has absorbed several smaller local schools, was included in Omaha Public Schools' court-ordered desegregation plan, and was one of the first schools in Omaha to become 100% Title I recipients. Sherman has been the site of recent protests related to the Omaha Public Schools' treatment of racial and ethnic diversity.

== Demographics ==
During the 2003-04 school year, 27.6% of students at Sherman were Latino; 62.6% were White; 7.8% were Native American; 1.2% were African American; 1.2% were of African descent; and 0.8% were of Asian descent. That year 243 students attended the school. There were 19 teachers on staff and the school had a student-teacher ratio of between 12 and 12.9 students per teacher.

== History ==
The school was named for General William Tecumseh Sherman, and shared its name with nearby Sherman Avenue, which today is called North 16th Street. In 1948 the nearby Beechwood School District was incorporated into Sherman School. Students from Pershing School, which was once located near Eppley Airfield, were sent to Sherman in 1976.

At its peak in 1965 the school served 560 students in grades kindergarten through eight. In 1976 seventh and eighth grade students were transferred to McMillan Junior High School, and the school was paired with Miller Park Elementary School. In 1995 Sherman became one of the first Title I recipients in the Omaha Public Schools system.

Students from the community surrounding Sherman attended Sherman for kindergarten and first grades, went to Miller Park for grades two through four, and then returned to Sherman for grades five and six. They were bussed to McMillan for junior high, and then went to North High School.

In 2002 the school was the site of protests by Omaha's Lao-Hmong immigrant community after the Omaha Police Department and Omaha Public Schools was accused of floundering during a physical abuse investigation.

Dianne Lee, a first grade teacher at Sherman, was named Nebraska Teacher of the Year in 2006 by the Nebraska Department of Education. She was also awarded the Award of Excellence in 2007.

In 2006 a kindergarten student at the school with a brain tumor received 10,000 birthday cards as a result of an appeal by her teacher.

== See also ==
- Education in North Omaha, Nebraska
- List of public schools in Omaha, Nebraska
