= Education in Omaha, Nebraska =

Education in Omaha, Nebraska is provided by many private and public institutions. The first high school graduates in the Omaha area came from Brownell-Talbot School, which was founded in the town of Saratoga in 1863. The oldest school building in continuous usage is Omaha Central High School.

== History ==
In the mid-19th century, Omaha joined other progressive cities in establishing schools for girls. The Episcopal Church founded Brownell Hall, an all-girls secondary boarding school in Saratoga. It officially opened on September 15, 1863. Located at present-day 24th and Grand Avenue, this private religious school was named after an Episcopal bishop of New York, and was first located in the Saratoga Springs Hotel, a defunct resort. Students came to the school from Nebraska City, Bellevue, Florence, Fontanelle, Decatur and Omaha. The school moved to downtown Omaha in 1868, and in the 1920s it moved to a central Omaha location. Today it known as Brownell-Talbot School, and is the oldest continuing school in Nebraska.

Saratoga School at Meridith Avenue and North 25th Street was started in 1866 by local citizens. The one room schoolhouse was one of the first public schools in Nebraska, and perhaps the first in the Omaha area. In 1927, businessmen formed the North Omaha Activities Association to re-develop Saratoga School's playing field into a college football field for Omaha University's football team. At that time the university was located immediately south in the Redick Mansion at the affluent Kountze Place suburb. With new bleachers built to accommodate a crowd of a thousand, the Saratoga Field was home to O.U.'s team until 1951. The community was also home to the Omaha Presbyterian Theological Seminary, which closed in 1943.

The Academy of the Sacred Heart was opened in 1882 to provide college preparatory education to young women in the Near North Side and Kountze Park neighborhoods; later, the school specifically served women in the Gold Coast and Bemis Park neighborhoods.

Technical High School was the third high school built in Omaha. The city's largest public school building was a five-winged building with a large athletic field that occupied three square city blocks between Burt and Cuming Streets from 30th to 33rd Streets. By 1940, enrollment had reached 3,684. The school was closed in 1984, and the building was completely renovated for use as the Omaha Public Schools central office. Today, it also serves as a home for the Career Center and Adult Education programs, serving 700-plus students daily. Omaha North High School at 36th Street and Ames Avenue occupies a hilltop view covering four square blocks. Constructed like a capital E and first occupied in September 1924, the building has 49 rooms, a cafeteria, a gymnasium and an auditorium.

=== Segregated schools ===
From the 1880s through the beginning of desegregation busing in Omaha Public Schools in the early 1970s, several segregated schools in North Omaha served the city's African American students. They included Howard Kennedy School, Lake School, Kellom School, Lothrop School, and Long School. Other schools in the area with large African American populations into the 1980s included Tech High, North High and Central High School. Into the 1970s, these were widely regarded as the city's "black schools", with de facto segregation based on residential housing patterns. African American students and teachers felt they were kept from achieving equity with schools across the city that white students attended.

A different type of segregation affected the students at the Nebraska School for the Deaf. The School, started in 1870 on 23 acres (93,000 m^{2}) between Bedford Avenue and Wirt Street, between 42nd and 44th Streets, served thousands of hearing-impaired students.

=== LB 1024 ===
As early as 2005, Nebraska State Senator Ernie Chambers proposed that North Omaha become responsible for educating its own students. Because of a proposal he made, on April 13, 2006, the Nebraska Legislature passed Legislative Bill 1024 that would create three separate school districts out of Omaha Public Schools, including one specifically for North Omaha. The governor of Nebraska signed the bill into law later that day.

Among other things, LB 1024 calls for Omaha Public Schools to be broken into three separate school districts. LB 1024 requires that each new district consist of contiguous high school attendance areas and include either two or three of the seven existing high schools. That allows about 20 ways to group the seven schools, depending on which adjacent high school attendance areas are grouped with the geographically most central area.

The three-district plan for OPS was proposed in amendment AM3142, introduced on the day the legislature first took up LB 1024. The suburban school districts reluctantly supported the three-district plan, seeing it as the most favorable of the bills proposed. The OPS leadership vehemently opposed the plan. AM3142 was approved on the day it was introduced by a counted vote of 33 to 6 with 10 senators not voting. Five days later a motion to reconsider AM3142 failed in a roll-call vote of 9 to 31 with 9 senators not voting.

It is suspected that OPS may file a suit challenging the new law. On May 16, 2006, the National Association for the Advancement of Colored People (NAACP) filed a suit against the governor and other Nebraska state officials charging that LB 1024, originally proposed by state senator Ernie Chambers, "intentionally furthers racial segregation." The NAACP lawsuit argues that because Omaha has racially segregated residential patterns, subdivided school districts will also be racially segregated, contrary to United States law. However the schools appear to be already segregated because of the neighborhoods, and children would have the option of going to any school in the district.

== Public school districts ==
Primary and secondary public schools in the Omaha metro area is served by eight districts.

Public school districts in the Omaha area
District name	Communities served	High schools
Bellevue Public Schools	Bellevue	Bellevue East High School; Bellevue West High School
Bennington Public Schools	Bennington	Bennington High School
Elkhorn Public Schools	Omaha	Elkhorn High School; Elkhorn South High School; Elkhorn North High School
Millard Public Schools	Omaha	Millard North High School; Millard West High School; Millard South High School
Omaha Public Schools	Omaha	Omaha Benson High School Magnet; Omaha Bryan High School; Omaha Burke High School; Omaha Career Center School; Omaha Central High School; Omaha North High School; Omaha Northwest High School; Omaha South High School; Technical High School - closed
Papillion-La Vista Public Schools	Papillion, La Vista	Papillion La Vista Senior High School; Papillion-La Vista South High School
Ralston Public Schools	Ralston, southwest Omaha	Ralston High School
Westside Community Schools	Omaha	Westside High School

Portions of the Omaha city limits are in the following school districts: Omaha Public Schools, Westside Community Schools, Ralston Public Schools, Millard Public Schools, and Elkhorn Public Schools.

=== Other public schools ===
- Nebraska School for the Deaf - Closed in 1998.

== Private schools ==
There are dozens of private schools in Omaha, including parochial and other types of schools.

Private schools in the Omaha area
School name
Brownell-Talbot School
Legacy School
Gethsemane Lutheran School
Good Shepherd Lutheran School
Montessori Learning Center Of Dundee
Omaha Private Instruction Institute
Montessori Children's House
Zion Peace Lutheran School
Friedel Jewish Academy
Omaha Christian Academy
Omaha Christian High School
Omaha Memorial SDA School
Phoenix Academy of Learning
Omaha Baptist Academy
The Children's Room, Inc.
Omaha Hearing School for Children

=== Catholic schools ===
All Catholic schools in Omaha are operated by the Roman Catholic Archdiocese of Omaha.

Catholic high schools in the Omaha area
School name
Archbishop Bergan High School
Cedar Catholic High School
Central Catholic High School
Creighton Preparatory School
Daniel J. Gross Catholic High School
Duchesne Academy
Holy Family High School
Marian High School
Mercy High School
Mount Michael Benedictine Abbey and High School
Norfolk Catholic High School
Pope John XXIII Central Catholic High School
Roncalli Catholic High School
St. Francis High School
St. Mary's High School
St. Peter Claver Cristo Rey Catholic High School
Scotus Central Catholic High School
V. J. and Angela Skutt Catholic High School

== Weekend complementary education institutions ==
The Omaha Japanese School (オマハ日本語補習授業校 Omaha Nihongo Hoshū Jugyō Kō), a Japanese weekend educational program approved by the Japanese Ministry of Education, holds its classes at the St. Mark Lutheran Church in Omaha.

== See also ==
- List of public schools in Omaha
- History of Omaha, Nebraska
- Education in North Omaha, Nebraska
- Varsity View Magazine
