= List of public schools in Omaha, Nebraska =

This is a list of public schools in Omaha, Nebraska, United States. The local school district, Omaha Public Schools, operates most public schools in Omaha, with the exception of Westside Community Schools and Millard Public Schools.

== Elementary schools ==
Elementary schools in the Omaha Public Schools
Name	Founded	Grades	Address	Zip code	Enrollment	Nickname
Adams Elementary	1925	K-5	3420 North 78 Street	68134	269	Awesome Archers
Ashland Park Robbins Elementary School	1994	PK-6	5050 South 51 Street	68117	864	Timberwolves
Bancroft Elementary School	1988	PK-6	2724 Riverview Boulevard	68108	774	Broncos
Beals Elementary School	1904	PK-6	1720 South 48 Street	68106	323	Bobcats
Belle Ryan Elementary School		PK-6	1807 South 60 Street	68117	319	Bulldogs
Belvedere Elementary School	1924	PK-5	3775 Curtis Avenue	68111	438	Bobcats
Benson West Elementary School	1870	PK-5	6652 Maple Street	68104	498	Bulldogs
Boyd Elementary School	1961	PK-5	8314 Boyd Street	68134	460	Beavers
Castelar Elementary School	1886	PK-5	2316 South 18 Street	68108	657	Cardinals
Catlin Arts Elementary Magnet Center	1967	K-5	12736 Marinda Street	68144	145	
Central Park Elementary School	1888	PK-5	4904 North 42 Street	68111	379	Cougars
Chandler View Elementary School	1959	PK-6	7800 South 25 Street	68147	663	Cougars
Columbian Elementary School	1892	K-6	330 South 127 Street	68154	252	Cobras
Conestoga Math and Economic Development Elementary Magnet Center	1965	PK-6	2115 Burdette Street	68110	354	Pioneers
Crestridge International Studies Elementary School	1962	K-6	818 Crestridge Road	68154	403	Vikings
Druid Hill Elementary School	1917	PK-5	4020 North 30 Street	68111	340	Dragons
Dundee Elementary School	1904	K-6	310 North 51 Street	68132	520	Wildcats
Edison Elementary School	1966	PK-6	2303 North 97 Street	68134	400	Eagles
Edward Babe Gomez Heritage Elementary School	2004	PK-4	5101 South 17 Street	68107	816	Timberwolves
Field Club Elementary School	1985	PK-5	3512 Walnut Street	68105	650	Falcons
Florence Elementary School	1889	K-5	7902 North 36 Street	68112	241	Foxes
Fontenelle Elementary School		PK-5	3905 North 52 Street	68104	586	Falcons
Franklin Elementary School		Pk-6	3506 Franklin Street	68111	325	Eagles
Fullerton Magnet Center		PK-4	4711 North 138 Street	68164	480	Falcons
Gateway Elementary School	2010	PK-6	5610 South 42 Street	68107	923	Eagles
Gifford Park Elementary School	2019	PK-6	717 North 52nd Street	68131	370	Groundhogs
Gilder Elementary School	1965	K-6	3705 Chandler Road	68147	370	Greats
Harrison Elementary School	1930	K-6	5304 Hamilton Street	68152	359	Tigers
Hartman Elementary School	1964	PK-5	5530 North 66 Street	68104	491	Hawks
Highland Elementary School	1889	PK-6	2625 Jefferson Street	68107	466	Roadrunners
Howard Kennedy Elementary School	1910	PK-5	2906 North 30 Street	68111	282	Tigers
Indian Hill Elementary School	1890	K-6	3121 U Street	68107	650	Bears
Jackson Elementary School		PK-6	620 South 31 Street	68105	250	Jaguars
Jefferson Elementary School	1924	K-6	4065 Vinton Street	68105	474	Jaguars
Joslyn Elementary School	1976	PK-6	11220 Blondo Street	68164	346	Jaguars
Kellom Elementary School (formerly Paul Street School)	1892	PK-6	1311 North 24 Street	68102	558	Stars
King Elementary School	1973	PK-5	3706 Maple Street	68111	380	Cubs
Laura Dodge Elementary School	1975	PK-5	3520 Maplewood Boulevard	68134	420	Wildcats
Liberty Elementary School	2002	PK-6	2021 St Mary's Avenue	68102	650	Stars
Lothrop Science & Technology Elementary Magnet Center		PK-4	3300 North 22 Street	68110	348	
Masters Elementary School	1970	PK-5	5505 North 99 Street	68134	280	Butterflies
Miller Park Elementary School	1912	PK-6	5625 North 28 Avenue	68111	429	Lions
Minne Lusa Elementary School	1922	PK-5	2728 Ida Street	68112	362	Panthers
Mount View Elementary School	1960	PK-5	5322 North 52 Street	68104	390	Lions
Oak Valley Elementary School	1963	PK-6	3109 Pedersen Drive	68144	250	Owls
Pawnee Elementary School	1966	PK-6	7310 South 48 Street	68157	454	Cubs
Picotte Elementary School	1992	K-4	14506 Ohio Street	68116	342	Pintos
Pinewood Elementary School		PK-5	6717 North 63 Street	68111	221	Panthers
Ponca Elementary School	1871	K-5	11300 North Post Road	68112	150	Raccoons
Prairie Wind Elementary School	1994	K-5	10908 Ellison Avenue	68164	714	Stallions
Rose Hill Elementary School		K-5	5605 Corby Street	68104	285	Rams
Saddlebrook Elementary	2009	PK-5	14850 Laurel Avenue	68116	484	Green Wave
Sherman Elementary School	1888	PK-6	5618 North 14 Avenue	68110	200	Sharks
Skinner Math, Technology and Performing Arts Elementary Magnet Center	1996	K-6	4304 North 33 Street	68111	221	Skyhawks
Spring Lake Math, Spanish and Technology Elementary Magnet Center	1975	PK-4	4215 South 20 Street	68107	700	Cougars
Springville Elementary School	1872	K-5	7400 North 60 Street	68152	438	Eagles
Standing Bear Elementary School	2004	PK-4	15860 Taylor Street	68116	574	Cubs
Sunny Slope Elementary School	1879	PK-5	10828 Old Maple Road	68164	436	Sunshines
Wakonda Elementary School	1993	PK-5	4845 Curtis Avenue	68104	350	Wildcats
Walnut Hill Elementary School	1888	PK-6	4555 Charles Street	68131	440	Wildcats
Washington Elementary School	1923	PK-6	5519 Mayberry Street	68106	290	Wildcats
Western Hills Elementary University Partnership Magnet Center	1953	K-6	6523 Western Avenue	68132	331	Wildcats

== Middle schools ==
Middle schools in the Omaha Public Schools
Name	Founded	Grades	Address	Zip code	Enrollment	Nickname
Alfonza W. Davis Middle School	2013	6–8	8050 North 129th Avenue	68142	725	Aviators
Alice Buffett Middle School Magnet Center	2004	5–8	14101 Larimore Avenue	68164	1,146	Bobcats
Beveridge Middle School Global Studies and Arts Magnet Center	1963	6–8	1616 South 120 Street	68144	833	Bulldogs
Bryan Middle School	1964	7–8	4606 Terrace Drive	68134	749	Bears
King Science and Technology Middle School Magnet Center	1973	6–8	3720 Florence Boulevard	68110	800	Wildcats
Lewis & Clark Middle School	1960	6–8	6901 Burt Street	68132	860	Trailblazers
McMillan Mathematics, Technology and Engineering Middle School Magnet Center	1958	6–8	3802 Redick Avenue	68112	779	Monarchs (Lions)
Monroe Middle School	1926	6–8	5105 Bedford Avenue	68104	861	Mustangs
Morton Magnet Middle School	1965	6–8	4606 Terrace Drive	68134	749	Panthers
Nathan Hale Leadership & Social Justice Middle School Magnet Center	1965	6–8	6143 Whitmore Street	68152	609	Patriots
Norris Middle School	1959	6–8	2235 South 46th Street	68106	1,121	Red Birds
R. M. Marrs Middle School Magnet Center	1962	6–8	5619 South 19th Street	68107	1,248	Falcons
Bluestem Middle School	2023	6–8	5910 S 42nd Street	68107	603	Mighty Meadowlarks

== High schools ==
Senior high schools in the Omaha Public Schools
Name	Founded	Grades	Address	Zip code	Enrollment	Nickname	Other info
Benson High Magnet School	1904	9–12	5120 Maple Street	68104	1,026	Mighty Bunnies	Health academy partnership with University of Nebraska Medical Center
Bryan High School	1965	9–12	4700 Giles Road	68157	1,968	Bears	
Burke High School	1963	9–12	12200 Burke Boulevard	68154	2,118	Bulldogs	
Omaha Central High School	1859	9 - 12	124 North 20 Street	68102	2,552	Eagles	Listed on the NRHP; International Baccalaureate (IB) program
Omaha North High STEM Magnet School	1924	9–12	4410 North 36 Street	68111	2,045	Vikings	
Omaha Northwest High Magnet School	1971	9–12	8204 Crown Point Avenue	68134	1,786	Huskies	
Omaha South High Magnet School	1901	9–12	4519 South 24 Street	68107	2,987	Packers	

Senior high schools in the Westside Community Schools
Name	Founded	Grades	Address	Zip code	Enrollment	Nickname	Other info
Westside High School	1951	9–12	8701 Pacific Street	68114	1,964	Warriors	An Apple-certified school focused on college prep; created to avoid integration of OPS

Senior high schools in the Millard Public Schools
Name	Founded	Grades	Address	Zip code	Enrollment	Nickname	Other info
Millard North High School	1981	9–12	1010 South 144 Street	68154	2,614	Mustang	
Millard South High School	1970	9–12	14905 Q Street	68137	2,360	Patriot	
Millard West High School	1995	9–12	5710 South 176 Street	68135	2,462	Wildcats	

== Alternative programs ==
Omaha Public Schools alternative programs
Name	Founded	Grades	Address	Zip code	Enrollment	Nickname
Accelere		9–12	2606 Hamilton	68131		
Adult High School			3230 Burt Street	68131		
Blackburn High School		9–12	2606 Hamilton	68131	430	Lions
Integrated Learning Program (ILP) at Saratoga		6–12	2504 Meredith Avenue	68111		Thunderbirds
Integrated Learning Program (ILP) at Skinner		K-6	4304 North 33 Street	68111		Thunderbirds
J.P. Lord		K-12	330 South 44 Street	68131		Pandas
Omaha Virtual School		K-12	4315 Cuming Street	68131		Ocelots
Parrish		6–12	4315 Cuming Street	68131	138	Panthers
Secondary Success Program		6–8	3030 Spaulding Street	68111		
Wilson Focus School		3–6	5141 F Street	68117		Lions
Yates Educational Community Partnership	2009		3260 Davenport Street	68131		

== Historical schools ==
The Board of Education in Omaha has operated a variety of schools since the city's founding in 1854. The first school in Omaha, a one-room schoolhouse, was opened on the southwest corner of Jefferson Square. After a brief closure in 1861, Omaha Public Schools formed again in 1863, and has operated continuously since. The following schools in Omaha were opened and closed since 1863.

Historic public schools
Name	Years	Grades	Address	Other information
Abraham Lincoln Elementary School	?-1984		11th and Center Streets	This was the original home of a statue now located at Bancroft Elementary School.
Brown Park Elementary School	1892		19th & U Street	
Cass School	1899		1418 Cass Street	
Central Elementary School			2201 Dodge Street, Capitol Square	
Clifton Hill			2811 North 45th Street	
Comenius			1430 South 15th Street	
Dodge School			11th and Dodge Streets	
Dupont School			29th Southwest corner of Martha Street	
East School			Southeast corner of 11th and Dodge Streets	
Fairfax School		Last use K and 1st grade	40th and Pratt	Two-room schoolhouse; church razed school for parking lot
Farnam School			2915 Farnam Street	
Forest School				
Gibson School			223 Hascall Street	
Hartman's Addition			East side of Sixteenth, south of Williams Street	
Izard School			North 19th and Izard Streets	This was the second school opened in Omaha, in 1872. When it was built, newspapers harangued the school board for building "so far out in the country."
Jackson Street School			South side of Jackson, between Twelfth and Thirteenth Streets	
Jungmann School	1899		20th & O Street	
Lake School	1888–1978	1-8	2410 North 19th Street	
Leavenworth School				Nellie Tayloe Ross, the first woman to serve as governor of an American State, taught at Leavenworth School in the late 1890s.
Lincoln School			1730 South 11th Street	aka Center School, now Lincoln School Apartments
Long School			Franklin & North 26th Streets	
Mason School	1889-1970s?		1012 South 24th Street	Designed by Mendelssohn, Fisher and Lawrie
Monmouth Park School	1903–1981		4508 North 33rd Street	Designed by Thomas Rogers Kimball, it was razed in 1995.
Omaha High School	1867			This was the third school in Omaha, and opened in 1872.
Omaha View School				
Pacific School			706 Park Avenue	
Park School	1918-1980s		1320 South 29th Street	Designed by Thomas Rogers Kimball, listed on the NRHP
Pershing School				
Pleasant School			South 25th and St. Mary's Avenue	
Robbins School	1910–1994		4302 South 39th Avenue	Listed on the NRHP
Rosewater School	1910-?		3764 South 13th Street	Named for Edward Rosewater, listed on the NRHP
Saunders School	1899-1979 (est)		415 North 41st Avenue	Listed on the NRHP
South Central	1889; rebuilt 1916		4701 South 25th Street	Former Polish home, now the El Museo Latino
Technical High School	1925–1984	10 - 12	3215 Cuming Street	Listed on the NRHP
Train School			1600 South 6th Street	
Vinton School	1908-?		2120 Deer Park Boulevard	Listed on the NRHP
Webster School			28th Avenue & Webster Streets	
Windsor School	1892		3401 Martha Street	Marlon Brando attended grade school for a few years here.

== See also ==
- Historical schools in North Omaha
- Historical schools in East Omaha
- Education in Omaha, Nebraska
- Education in North Omaha
