= Omaha High School =

Omaha High School may refer to:

- Omaha High School (Arkansas), Omaha, Arkansas
- Norris City-Omaha-Enfield High School, Norris City, Illinois
- Several schools in Omaha, Nebraska
  - Omaha Benson High School Magnet
  - Omaha Bryan High School
  - Omaha Burke High School
  - Omaha Career Center School
  - Omaha Central High School, initially known as Omaha High School
  - Omaha North High School
  - Omaha Northwest High School
  - Omaha South High School
