= Lothrop School =

Lothrop Magnet Center

Location
- 3300 North 22nd Street; Omaha, Nebraska; United States
- 41°17′23″N 95°56′46″W

Information
- Type: Public elementary magnet school
- School district: Omaha Public Schools
- Grades: Pre-K through fourth grade
- Website: link

Lothrop Magnet Center is a public elementary school located at 3300 North 22nd Street in the Kountze Place neighborhood of North Omaha, Nebraska, United States. As a magnet school it focuses on the topics of science, Spanish and technology. The school currently serves 380 students in prekindergarten through fourth grade.

The school was one of Omaha's "black schools".

In 1998 the school was protested by a Christian organization for offering professional development courses on homosexuality awareness after offensive slang was repeatedly heard throughout the school. The group later offered a public apology.

== Present demographics ==
In the 2007–08 school year African American students accounted for 84.7% of the total population of Lothrop. White students made up 8.1% and Hispanics accounted for 5.1% of the student population. The mobility rate was 22.2% and the attendance rate was 93.6%. Free and reduced lunch recipients accounted for 78.8% of the student population. It is a Title I school with a 66.68% poverty rate.

== See also ==
- Education in North Omaha, Nebraska
- List of public schools in Omaha, Nebraska
