= Mockingbird Elementary School =

Mockingbird Elementary School may refer to:

- Mockingbird Elementary School (Dallas) - Dallas Independent School District
- Mockingbird Elementary School (Coppell, Texas, Dallas-Fort Worth area) - Coppell Independent School District
- Mockingbird Elementary School (Omaha, Nebraska) - Ralston Public Schools
