= Long School =

Location
- 2520 Franklin Street; Omaha, Nebraska; United States
- Coordinates: 41°16′30″N 95°56′58″W

Information
- Type: Public elementary school
- School district: Omaha Public Schools
- Grades: K-8

Long School was once located at 2520 Franklin Street in the Near North Side area of North Omaha, Nebraska, United States. Long the focal point of the surrounding neighborhood, Long School was one of Omaha's "black schools". In 1952 it was identified as being the only school in Omaha with a 100% African-American student body population. The first two African-American teachers in public education in Omaha were assigned to Long School in 1940. In 1947 the first African-American principal in Omaha, Eugene Skinner, was appointed to the school.

== Building history ==
Long school was named after Eben K. Long, a Union Pacific Railroad employee who was on the school board, as well as serving as a judge. (Union Pacific is also headquartered in Omaha, where the school was located.) The building was constructed in 1893. Designed by locally renowned architect John Latenser, Sr., the school was lauded for "decorating and beautifying" its hall. With eight classrooms for kindergarten through eighth grade, the school cost $25,000 to construct. The building was closed and demolished in the 1980s.

== Whitney Young ==
When Civil Rights Movement leader Whitney Young arrived in Omaha in 1950, Omaha Public Schools employed twelve Black educators. These educators, including several from Long School, quickly taught Young about schools in Omaha. Eugene Skinner, the school's principal, invited Young to speak at the commencement that year.

== See also ==
- Education in North Omaha, Nebraska
- List of public schools in Omaha, Nebraska
