= Ralston High School =

Location
- 8969 Park Drive; Ralston, Nebraska 68127; United States; 41°12′02″N 96°03′04″W

Information
- Type: Public
- Established: 1954
- School district: Ralston Public Schools
- Principal: Jesse Tvrdy
- Teaching staff: 58.09 (FTE)
- Enrollment: 1,039 (2023–2024)
- Student to teacher ratio: 17.89
- Colors: Red, columbia blue, and white
- Mascot: Ralston Rams
- Rival: Gross Catholic, Skutt Catholic, Beatrice High, Omaha Concordia
- Website: Ralston H.S.

Ralston High School (RHS) is located in Ralston, a suburb of Omaha, Nebraska, United States. The school, a part of Ralston Public Schools, opened in 1954 as a building for grades 7–12, located at 82nd and Lakeview Drive. It relocated to its current address on 8969 Park Drive in 1969. Prior to 1954, Ralston students went to Omaha South High School as Ralston Schools only had grades K–8. The former high school building was converted to the middle school.

Its attendance boundary includes Ralston and sections of Omaha.

Ralston High School's colors are red, white and columbian blue.

In 2006, Ralston High School's enrollment jumped from 850 to 1,090 students. It is becoming a more diverse school.

== Extracurricular activities ==
=== Athletics ===
The athletic teams are known as the Ralston Rams. Ralston participates in Nebraska's second-largest class.

The school's baseball teams have experienced success, with 18 appearances in the state tournament, their most recent appearance in 2006. The Rams have been in the finals seven times, and captured the state title seven times, holding the second most state titles in baseball, behind Creighton Prep's eight. The football team has been successful as well since Head Coach Tyler Zahn took over. They made an appearance in the State Finals in 2002, where they beat their rival Gross to make it to Memorial Stadium in Lincoln. Ralston played tough but lost to McCook. The closest the Rams have come to the finals again was in 2011, when the Rams beat Scottsbluff in Scottsbluff and came home to face the top seed Gretna, where they lost. Ralston basketball has also had some fantastic success lately, winning the State Title in 2008 against Beatrice. From that team, two top athletes went on to play Division 1 Basketball at Colorado State. Brothers Greg and Dwight Smith led the team that year, and they were both nominated as All-State in 2008. Ralston Basketball is one of the top programs in the last decade behind Beatrice and Gretna, with a winning percentage of 64.3% and a win total of 146 in the last 10 years. The Rams' student section known as the "Rowdies" attends every major sporting event.

=== Arts ===
The Ralston Performing Arts Centre is located inside Ralston High School. This stage is used once a year in the summer by the Ralston Community Theatre, and is used throughout the school year by Ralston Drama students. The theatre, along with the entire school, was recently renovated and now seats 600+ people. The new theatre's first show was Les Misérables, in May 2005.

The Ralston Fine Arts Department has had success in recent years. The band has almost tripled in size, received numerous awards including best drumline, best drum major, and has had continuous success at competitions, receiving all "superior" and "excellent" ratings.

Ralston High School has two competing show choirs: Runway and Rush. Rush has had successful competition seasons, often placing in the top of their division and competing in finals. In recent years Rush has been named grand champion at Millard West Singsation and at Bishop Heelan High School show choir invitational. Ralston now hosts a show choir invitational of their own, called Ramageddon.

The theater department is also considered to be higher quality in its region because of its numerous awards and an experienced director Todd Uhrmacher.

=== Debate ===
The Ralston Debate Team has had much success in recent years under the coaching of Jennifer Stark. She has earned Nebraska Coach of the Year honors on two occasions, 2009–10 and 2013–14. The team has qualified for national tournaments multiple times, and took home third place Sweepstakes at the start of the 2013 season. Kurt Cronican placed fifth in the nation at the National Forensic League tournament. The team has rapidly grown in size in recent years, increasing the number of students and participants in a wide variety of events. The team competes in Lincoln–Douglas, Public Forum, Policy and Congressional Debate at the state and national level. For the 2015–2016 school year, Jennifer Stark was replaced by Jeff Garst, one of her most successful debaters.

== See also ==
- Education in Omaha, Nebraska
