= Miller Park Elementary School =

Public school in Omaha, Nebraska, US

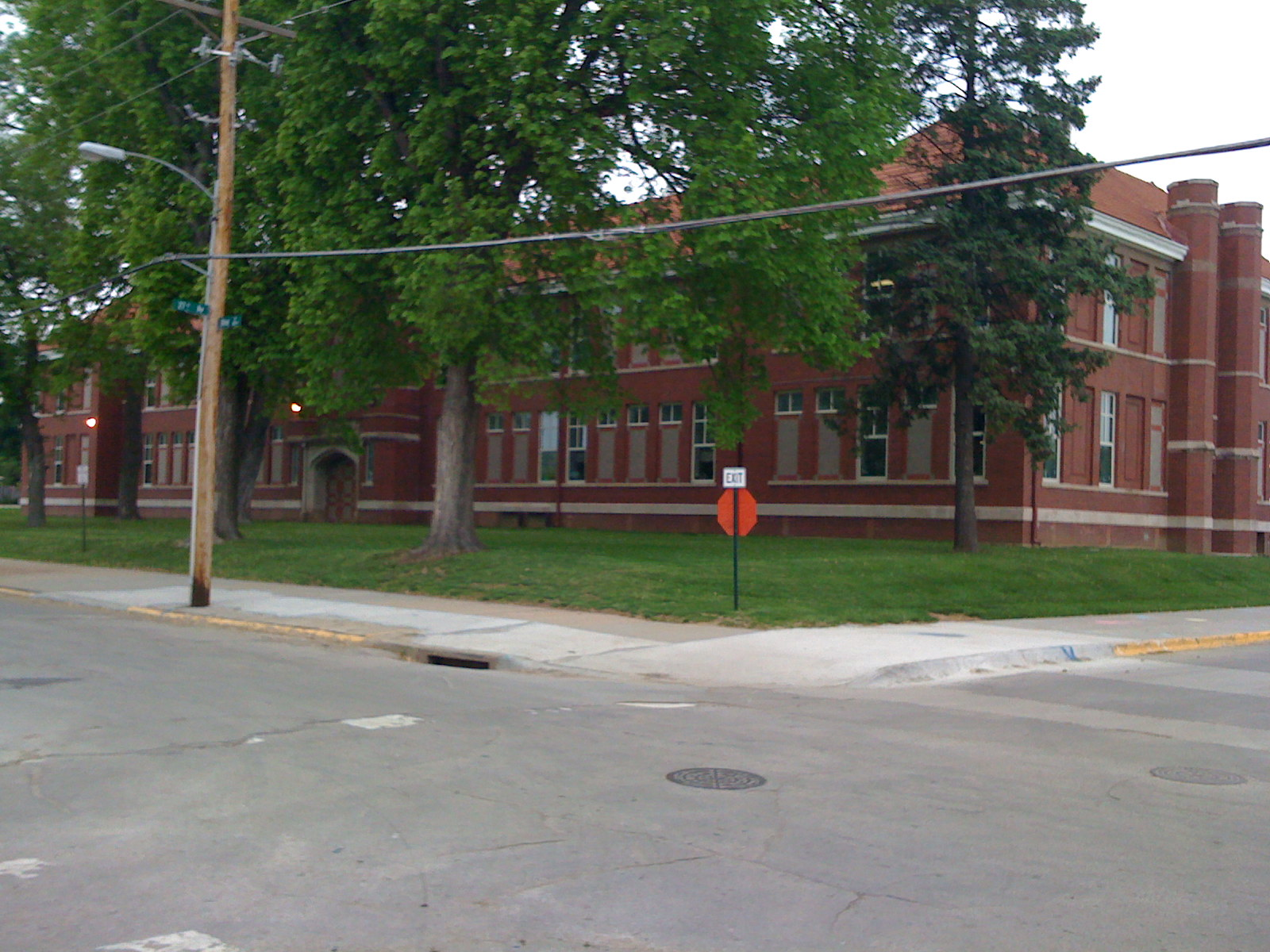

Location
- 5625 North 28th Avenue; Omaha, Nebraska 68112; United States
- 41°18′37″N 95°57′13″W

Information
- Type: Public elementary school
- Motto: "In it to win it!"
- School district: Omaha Public Schools
- Principal: Dan Kirchhevel
- Grades: Pre-K-6
- Colors: Black and gold
- Mascot: Simba
- Website: http://www.ops.org/elementary/millerpark/

Miller Park Elementary School is located at 5625 North 28th Avenue in the Miller Park neighborhood in Omaha, Nebraska, United States. The school is credited for creating the original Junior Forest Club concept.

== About ==
The original Miller Park School was opened in 1912 and named for Omaha pioneer George L. Miller, with the current building constructed in 1928. In 2002, the building received a major addition and renovation, including administrative space, gymnasium, cafeteria and classrooms.

The school's home attendance area extends from Redick Avenue on the north to Sorenson Parkway on the south, from Florence Boulevard on the east to North 30th Avenue on the west, as well as the Fort Omaha campus. In 2014–15 the school reportedly had 450 students.

The school has been noted throughout its history for its curricular innovations and the extra-curricular activities. In the late 1930s several organizations studied the school's programs, including the National Education Association and several independent researchers. In 1984 Miller Park's "pioneer classroom", a replica of a one room schoolhouse, was featured by the National Trust for Historic Preservation. The school is also credited for creating the original Junior Forest Club concept. Today Miller Park participates in the U.S. Department of Education's Reading First program.

Miller Park has several community business partners, including Metropolitan Community College, the DLR Group, and the Charles Drew Health Center.

== See also ==
- Education in North Omaha, Nebraska
- List of public schools in Omaha, Nebraska
