= Lake School =

Location
- 2410 North 19th Street; Omaha, Nebraska 68111; United States
- Coordinates: 41°16′51″N 95°56′27″W

Information
- Type: Public, elementary school
- Established: 1888
- Closed: 1978
- School district: Omaha Public Schools
- Grades: 1-8

Lake School was a public elementary school in the Near North Side neighborhood of Omaha, Nebraska, United States. The school was one of Omaha's "black schools", and served grade one through grade eight. It closed in the 1970s.

== History ==
Built in 1888, Lake started in an 1879 two-room frame schoolhouse opened in 1879, making it one of the oldest schools in the Omaha School District. It was a two-and-a-half story brick building with a peaked roofline and decorative elements at the peaks. There was a bell tower protruding from the top of one part of the east side of the building.

The school's first principal was Emma Whitmore, who locked the names of the first graduates in a metal box, and had them buried beneath a new tree at the school. The key was then attached by ribbon to a pigeon released to an unknown destination.

The second building was replaced in 1910.

When it was built, the surrounding neighborhood was a predominantly white community with several European immigrant populations, including Russian Jews, Scandinavians, Italians and others, as well as a nascent African American population. In 1919, rioting after the lynching of Will Brown focused on the neighborhood containing Lake School. The US Army intervened and established the city's first official redlining, and ensuing white flight over the next several years resulted in Lake School's student population and surrounding neighborhood becoming more predominantly African American.

By 1976, the school population was almost entirely African American. That year, the U.S. Supreme Court ruled in United States of America v. The School District of Omaha that Omaha Public Schools routinely segregated schools, including Lake School. In 1978 the school was closed, and the building became a special services school for developmentally disabled students. The building was closed and sold to the Seventh-day Adventist church in 1984 and operated as a private school in 1984. After operating for approximately 15 years, it was closed.

Today, the third Lake School serves as an apartment complex called Fullwood Square.

== See also ==
- Education in North Omaha, Nebraska
- List of public schools in Omaha, Nebraska
