= Dick Davis (running back) =

American football player (born 1946)

No. 32, 36
- Position: Running back

Personal information
- Born: November 28, 1946 (age 79); Omaha, Nebraska, U.S.
- Listed height: 5 ft 11 in (1.80 m)
- Listed weight: 215 lb (98 kg)

Career information
- High school: Omaha North
- College: Nebraska (1965–1968)
- NFL draft: 1969: 12th round, 306th overall pick

Career history
- Jersey Jays (1969); Cleveland Browns (1969); Denver Broncos (1970); New Orleans Saints (1970)

Awards and highlights
- First-team All-Big Eight (1967)

Career NFL statistics
- Rushing yards: 94
- Rushing average: 3.5
- Receptions: 4
- Receiving yards: 29
- Stats at Pro Football Reference

Dick C.E. Davis (born November 28, 1946) is an American former professional football player who was a running back for one season in the National Football League (NFL) with the Denver Broncos and New Orleans Saints. He was selected by the Cleveland Browns in the twelfth round of the 1969 NFL/AFL draft after playing college football for the Nebraska Cornhuskers.

== Early life ==
Dick C.E. Davis was born on November 28, 1946, in Omaha, Nebraska. He attended Omaha North High School in Omaha, participating in football, wrestling, and track. He averaged 10.4 yards per carry in football and also set the Metropolitan Conference record for most touchdowns per game. Davis was a two-time state champion in wrestling as well and was named the Omaha World-Herald athlete of the year. He was inducted into the Nebraska High School Sports Hall of Fame Foundation in 1999.

== College career ==
Davis was a member of the Nebraska Cornhuskers of the University of Nebraska–Lincoln from 1965 to 1968 and a three-year letterman from 1966 to 1968. He rushed 29 times for 154 yards and one touchdown in 1966 while also catching two passes for 18 yards. In 1967, he totaled 162 carries for 717 yards and one touchdown, and 17 receptions for 210 yards and one touchdown. Davis was named first-team All-Big Eight by the Associated Press for the 1967 season. As a senior in 1968, he rushed 158 times for 606 yards and two touchdowns while also catching seven passes for 80 yards. Davis was a two-time Academic All-American at Nebraska and graduated with a bachelor's degree. He was inducted into the Nebraska Football Hall of Fame in 1995.

== Professional career ==
Davis was selected by the Cleveland Browns in the 12th round, with the 306th overall pick, of the 1969 NFL/AFL draft. On September 27, 1969, he was demoted to the Browns' taxi squad after the team activated running back Charles Leigh. Davis did not appear in any games for the Browns during the 1969 season. He did play for the Browns' farm team, the Jersey Jays of the Continental Football League, in 1969. He rushed 57 times for 92 yards and one touchdown while also catching one touchdown for the Jays.

Davis signed with the Denver Broncos on February 12, 1970. Head coach Lou Saban said that the Broncos had been interested in Davis since his college career at Nebraska. He played in two games for the Broncos during the 1970 season but did not record any statistics. On October 24, 1970, it was reported that Davis had been waived so that the Broncos could activate Clem Turner.

On November 25, 1970, it was reported that Davis had signed with the New Orleans Saints. He played in four games, starting two, for the Saints during the 1970 season, rushing 27 times for 94 yards while also catching four passes for 29 yards. In July 1971, he was fined by the Saints for failing to report to training camp. A spokesperson for the Saints said that Davis had indicated that he may try to play in the Canadian Football League. Davis was released by the Saints later in 1971.

== Personal life ==
Davis spent some time playing flag football in a recreational league after his NFL career. He earned a master's degree from the University of Nebraska Omaha, and a Doctor of Education from the University of Nebraska–Lincoln. In 1980, he was given a national Human and Civil Rights award by the National Education Association for his work as a principal in the Omaha Public Schools system. He served on the state of Nebraska's Coordinating Commission for Postsecondary Education from its founding in 1991 until January 2012. Davis served on the Liaison Committee on Medical Education as well. He was also the CEO of Davis Companies, a family business that provides "insurance, bonding and consultation" services.
