= Omaha Westview High School =

School in Bennington, Nebraska, US

Coordinates: 41°19′29.89″N 96°9′44.46″W

Westview High School

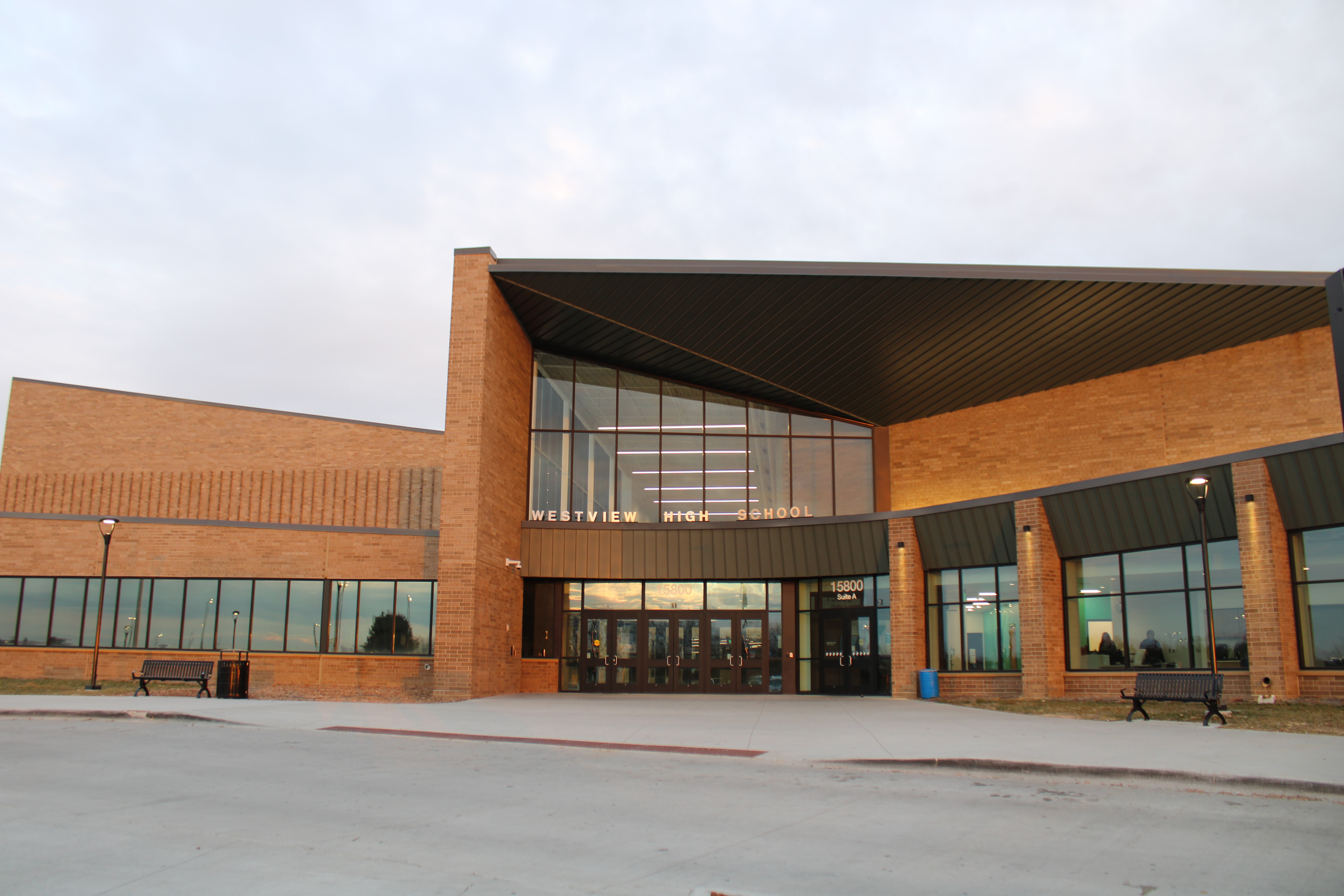
- The main entrance of Westview High School in 2023
- 15800 Summit Plaza; Bennington, Nebraska; United States

Information
- Type: Public high school
- School district: Omaha Public Schools
- Principal: Thomas Lee
- Teaching staff: 76 (2024-2025)
- Grades: 9–12
- Enrollment: 1,573 (2024-2025)
- Student to teacher ratio: 20.70 (2024-2025)
- Colors: Orange and blue
- Mascot: Wolverine
- Website: www.ops.org/westview

Westview High School is a secondary school located in Omaha, Nebraska, United States, part of Omaha Public Schools. The current principal is Thomas Lee. The school colors are orange and blue and the mascot is the wolverine.

== History ==
The creation of two new high schools for Omaha Public Schools, the first in the district since Omaha Bryan High School in 1971, was added as a part of the Phase 2 Bond issue, approved by Omaha Public Schools voters in 2018. Westview, located at the intersection of 156th and Ida streets in far northwest Omaha and designed to accommodate up to 1,500 students, was substantially completed in May 2022. It opened for students in August for the 2022-2023 school year, initially serving students in grades nine and ten. Westview phased in all four grades starting with the 2024–2025 school year.

Westview partially shares facilities with a YMCA branch that is connected to the school building, including a pool and exercise rooms.

== Extracurricular Activities ==
=== Athletics ===
The Wolverines compete in Class A, the largest classification in Nebraska according to the Nebraska School Activities Association. Taryn Stern, a student in Westview's first graduating class, won the school's first state championship in individual girls' bowling in 2025.

=== Girls Wrestling ===
The Westview girls wrestling program has had three individual state champions. Kalynn Lyons became Westview's first girls' individual NSAA state champion in 2025, winning the 130 pound state championship as a junior. That same day, Audre Herron became the second Westview wrestler to earn a state title, claiming the 235 pound NSAA state championship as a senior. Kalynn Lyons earned her second 130 pound NSAA state championship as a senior. During Lyons' senior season, she went 49-0, setting a new NSAA Class A State Record for Career Takedowns, with 431 total.

=== Dance Team ===
Westview and Burke High School's joint dance team placed 13th in the nation in the medium poms in 2023, competing against a field of 90 teams from all around the United States.

=== Robotics ===
The Westview High 15800A “Atticus” robotics team has placed consistently high, especially in the JROTC National Division, including National Finalist in 2024 and 2025, and National Champion with 98601Y “Atlantis” from Troy High School at the 2026 National Championship. The team's innovation was awarded with the 2026 National CREATE Award after development of the Atticus Terminal, a coding tool used to create Vex V5 autonomous routines with high accuracy in a short period of time. The team earned their first Worlds qualification in 2026.

=== Academic Competitions ===
In 2026, Westview High School student Austin McGrath earned a national gold medal in the United States Physics Olympiad (USAPhO), a highly selective physics competition administered by the American Association of Physics Teachers. The competition serves as part of the selection process for the U.S. National Physics Team representing the United States. McGrath stands as one of 38 students nationwide to be awarded the gold medal, marking a first in Nebraska's history.
