= Howard Kennedy School =

Coordinates: 41°17′08″N 95°57′26″W

Howard Kennedy Elementary School
- 2906 N. 30th Street; Omaha, Nebraska 68011; United States

Information
- Type: Public elementary school
- School district: Omaha Public Schools
- Grades: K-5
- Website: Howard Kennedy School

Howard Kennedy Elementary School is located at 2906 North 30th Street in North Omaha, Nebraska, United States. Almost since its inception Kennedy was regarded as one of Omaha's "black schools," almost exclusively African American. Football great Gale Sayers attended the school.

== History ==
The school was founded in 1892 as Omaha View School, as it sat on a hill overlooking downtown. In 1918 the school was home to Omaha's champion student writer: eighth grader Alice Watson was lauded in the national Negro Year Book: An Annual Encyclopedia of the Negro for the honor.

The current building was constructed in 1910, and was renamed after the first public school educator in Omaha, who served as the first teacher, principal and superintendent starting in 1859. Kennedy originally served students from kindergarten through ninth grade.

Kennedy was remodeled extensively in 2005.

== Present ==
Today the school has approximately 240 students, with a student body which is more than 84% African American. Hispanics count for 10%, and white students for 5%, with Native American and "other" covering the remainder.

Kennedy is a schoolwide Title I with an 84.26% poverty rate. It is a participant in the Nebraska 21st Century Community Learning Centers Grant Program funded by the United States Department of Education.

Starting in 2005 the school became a part of the Bright Futures Partnership, a collaboration between Omaha Public Schools and several nonprofit organizations designed to help at-risk youth prepare for middle school and work toward high school graduation. The school also participates in an annual Omaha Police Department basketball tournament.

== See also ==
- Education in North Omaha, Nebraska
- List of public schools in Omaha, Nebraska
