= List of Playboy Playmates of 2007 =

The following is a list of Playboy Playmates of 2007. Playboy magazine names its Playmate of the Month each month throughout the year.

== January ==
Jayde Nicole
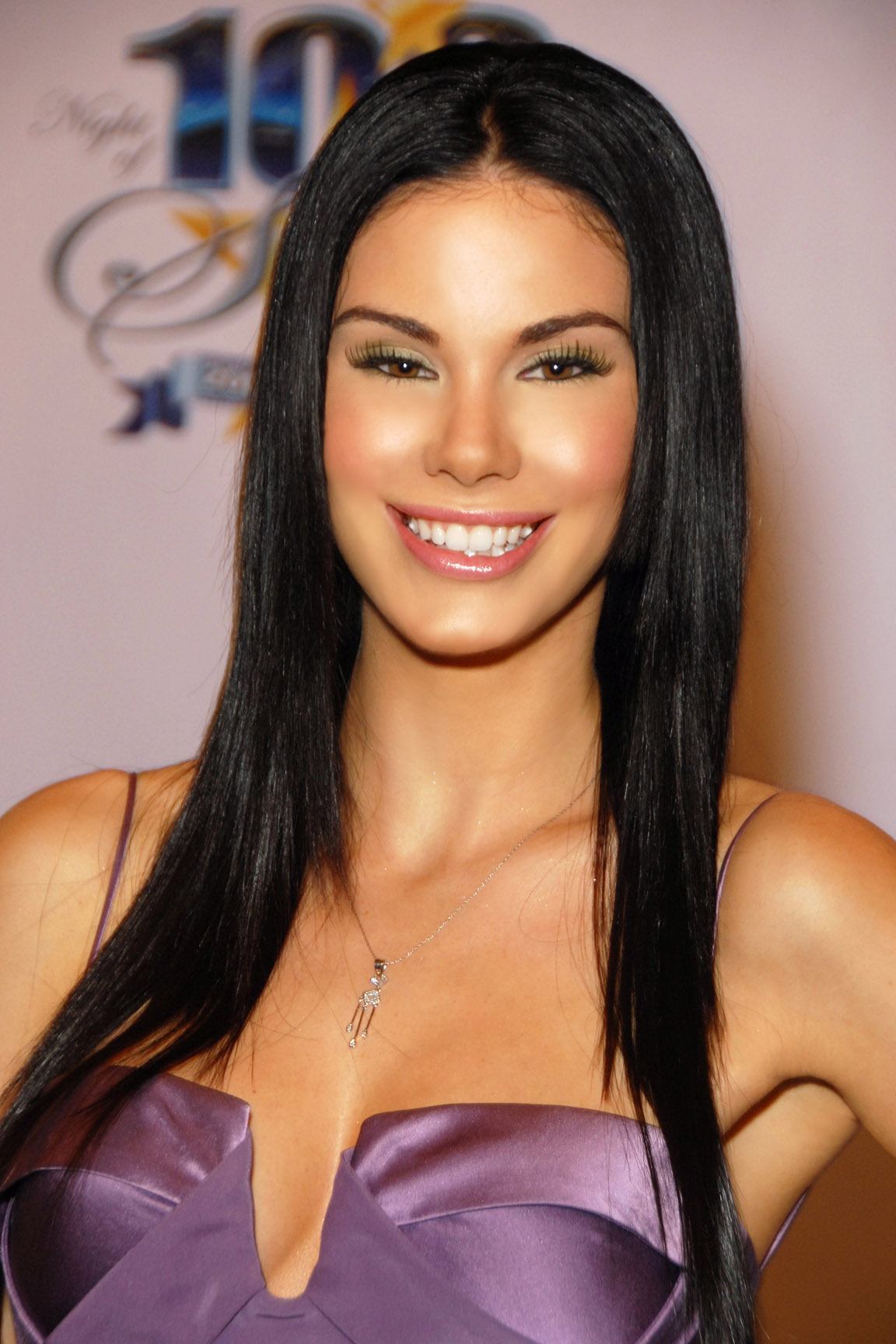
- Nicole in 2010

Playboy Playmate of the Year
- 2008
- Preceded by: Sara Jean Underwood
- Succeeded by: Ida Ljungqvist

Personal details
- Born: 19 February 1986 (age 40) Scarborough, Canada
- Height: 5 ft 9 in (175 cm)

Jayde Nicole (born February 19, 1986) is a Canadian model. She is Playboy's Playmate of the Month for January 2007 and was named the 2008 Playmate of the Year in the June issue of the men's magazine. She is the first Canadian Playmate of the Year in 26 years, and the third overall.

== February ==
Heather Rene Smith
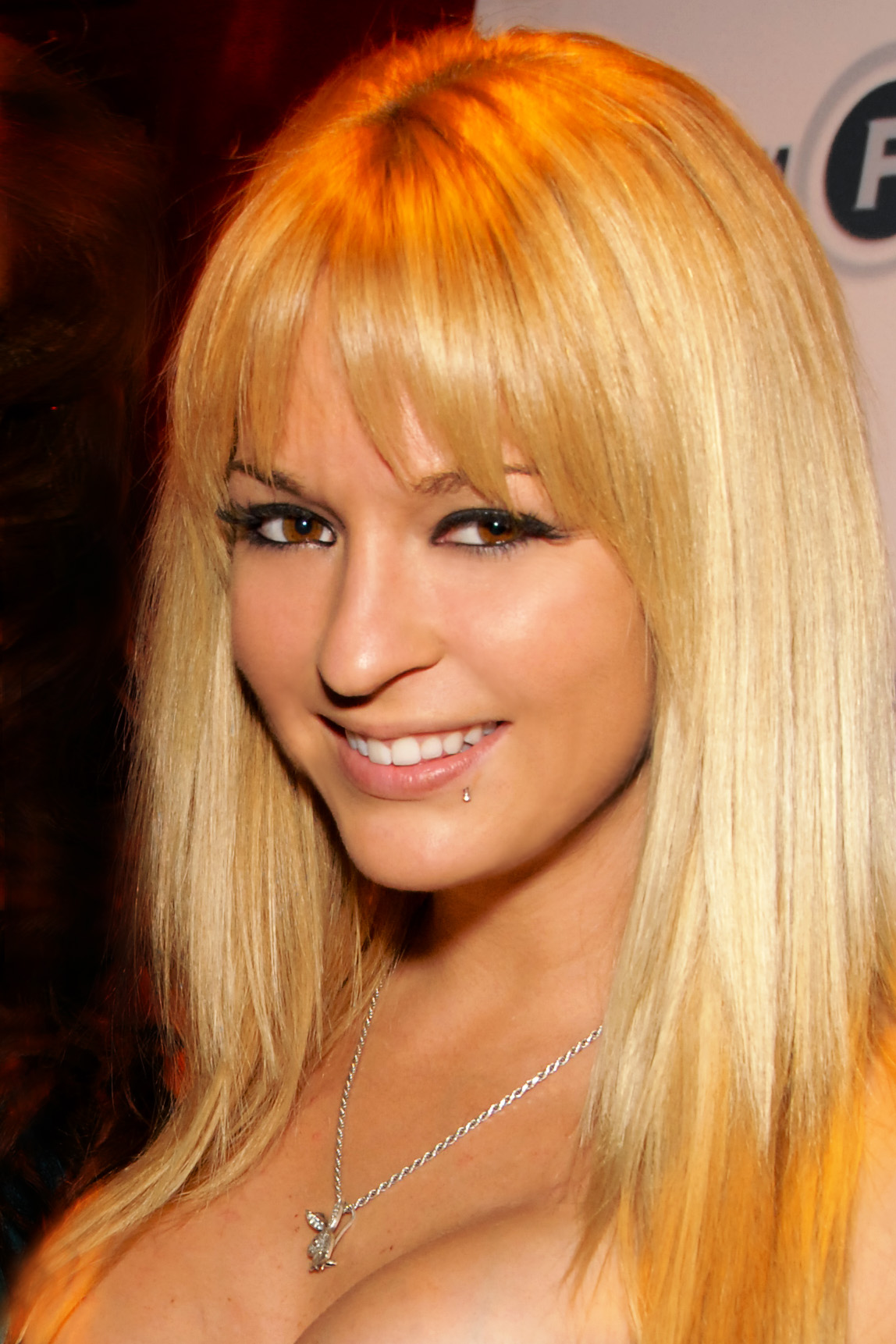
- Smith in 2009

Personal details
- Born: January 8, 1987 (age 39) Salinas, California, United States
- Height: 5 ft 3 in (1.60 m)

Heather Rene Smith (born January 8, 1987) is an American model. Smith is the Playboy Playmate for February 2007. She also appeared on the cover of the October/November 2006 issue of Playboy Lingerie and as Co-ed of the Week at Playboy's Cyber Club in July 2006, billed as simply "Heather René."

== March ==
Tyran Richard

Personal details
- Born: October 1, 1982 (age 43) Zachary, Louisiana, United States
- Height: 5 ft 8 in (1.73 m)

Tyran Richard (Pronounced "Ree-shard", born October 1, 1982) is an American model. She is the Playboy Playmate for March 2007. Richard graduated from Southeastern Louisiana University in 2005.

== April ==
Giuliana Marino
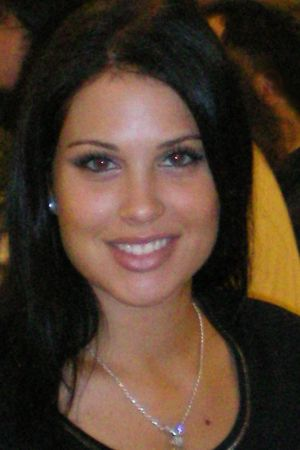

Personal details
- Born: May 13, 1986 (age 40) Nuremberg, Germany
- Height: 5 ft 6 in (1.68 m)

Giuliana Marino (born 13 May 1986 in Nuremberg, Germany) is Playmate of the Month for April 2005 in the German edition of Playboy and later the Playmate of the Year 2005 in Germany (2006 in U.S. notation). She went on to become the Playmate of the Month for April 2007 in the U.S. edition of Playboy.

== May ==
Shannon James

Personal details
- Born: February 5, 1987 (age 39) Holland, Pennsylvania, U.S.
- Height: 5 ft 8 in (1.73 m)

Shannon James (born February 5, 1987) is the Playboy Playmate of the Month for May 2007. She was born in Holland, Pennsylvania and was discovered on the Howard Stern Show. At the time of her photo shoot she attended the University of Central Florida and was a member of Zeta Tau Alpha sorority. James has also been featured in Maxim UK and other publications.

== June ==
Brittany Binger
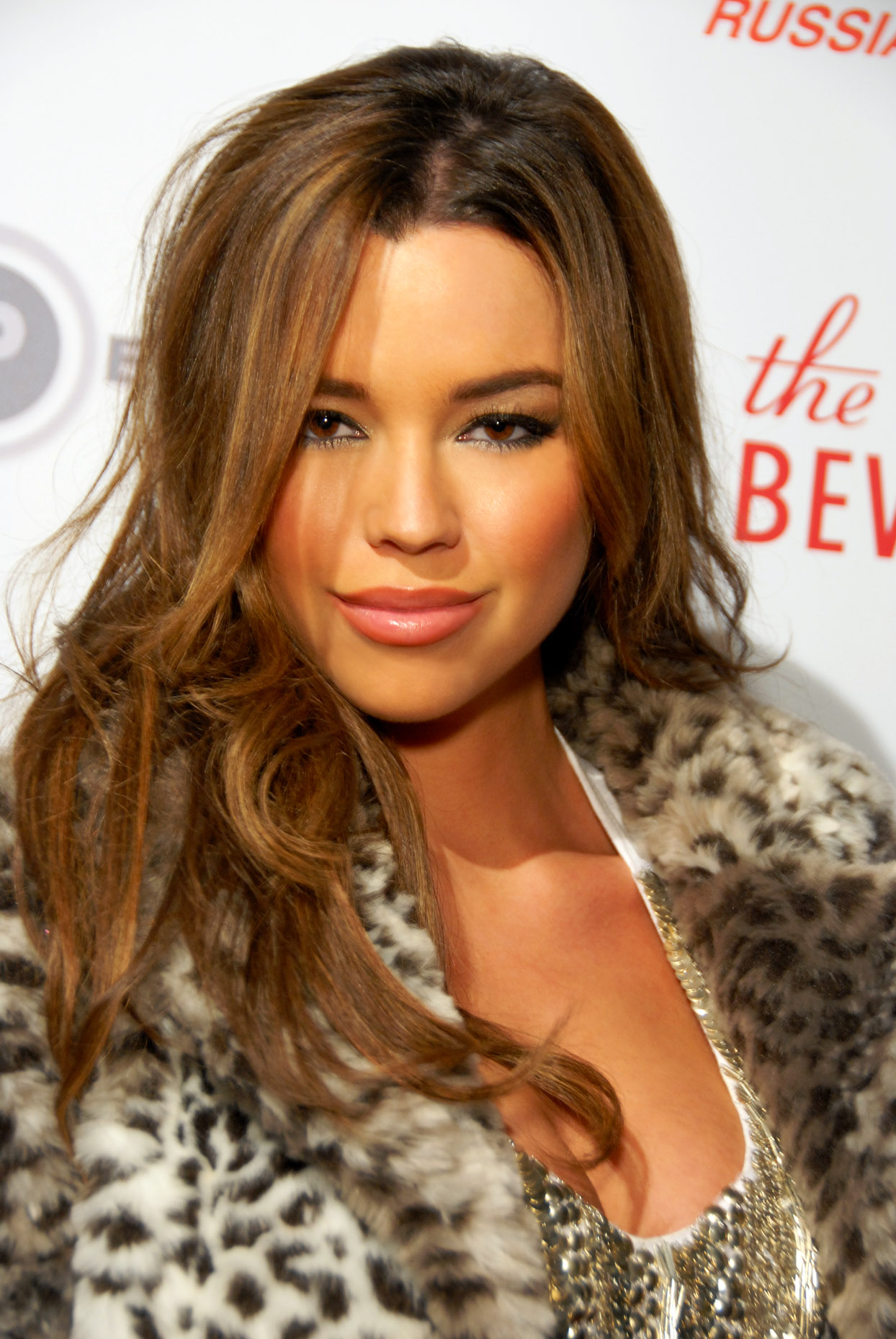

Personal details
- Born: March 24, 1987 (age 39) Bellevue, Ohio, US
- Height: 5 ft 7 in (170 cm)

Brittany Binger (born March 24, 1987) is an American model who is the Playboy Playmate of the Month for June 2007.

== July ==
Tiffany Selby

Personal details
- Born: November 14, 1981 (age 44) Jacksonville, Florida, U.S.
- Height: 5 ft 7 in (170 cm)

Tiffany Selby (born November 11, 1981) is an American model from Jacksonville, Florida. She is the Playboy Playmate of the Month for July 2007. Selby has also competed in Hawaiian Tropic contests and been a member of the USA National Bikini Team.

== August ==
Tamara Sky

Personal details
- Born: February 20, 1985 (age 41) San Juan, Puerto Rico
- Height: 5 ft 6 in (168 cm)

Tamara Sky (born February 20, 1985) is a Puerto Rican professional disc jockey and model. She was the centerfold for the April 2006 issue of the Mexican edition of Playboy, then named Playmate of the Month for August 2007 for the United States edition.

== September ==
Patrice Hollis
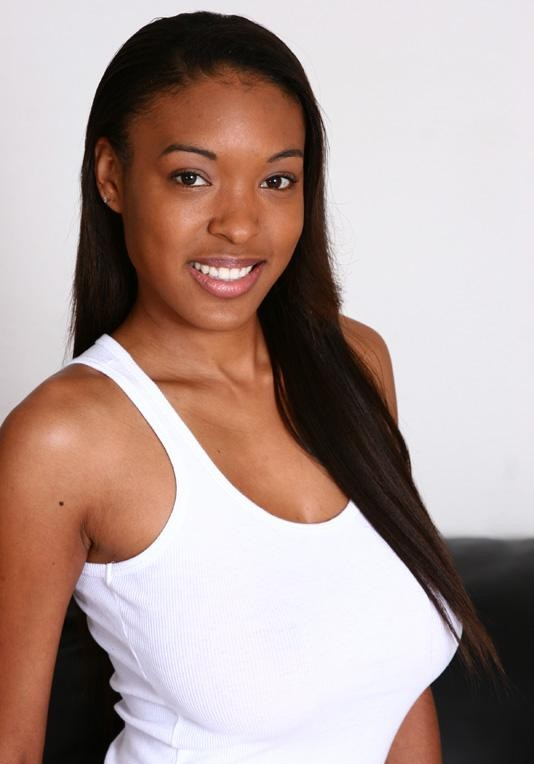

Personal details
- Born: September 1, 1981 (age 44) Las Vegas, Nevada, U.S.
- Height: 5 ft 8 in (173 cm)

Patrice Hollis (born September 1, 1981) is an American model, who is the Playboy Playmate for September 2007. In 2011, she appeared on Jerry Springer's Program called:"Baggage". She was Finalist and Declined the Date. Baggage You Light Me on Fire Season 2; Episode 128 (2011) Jerry Springer (Host)

== October ==
Spencer Scott
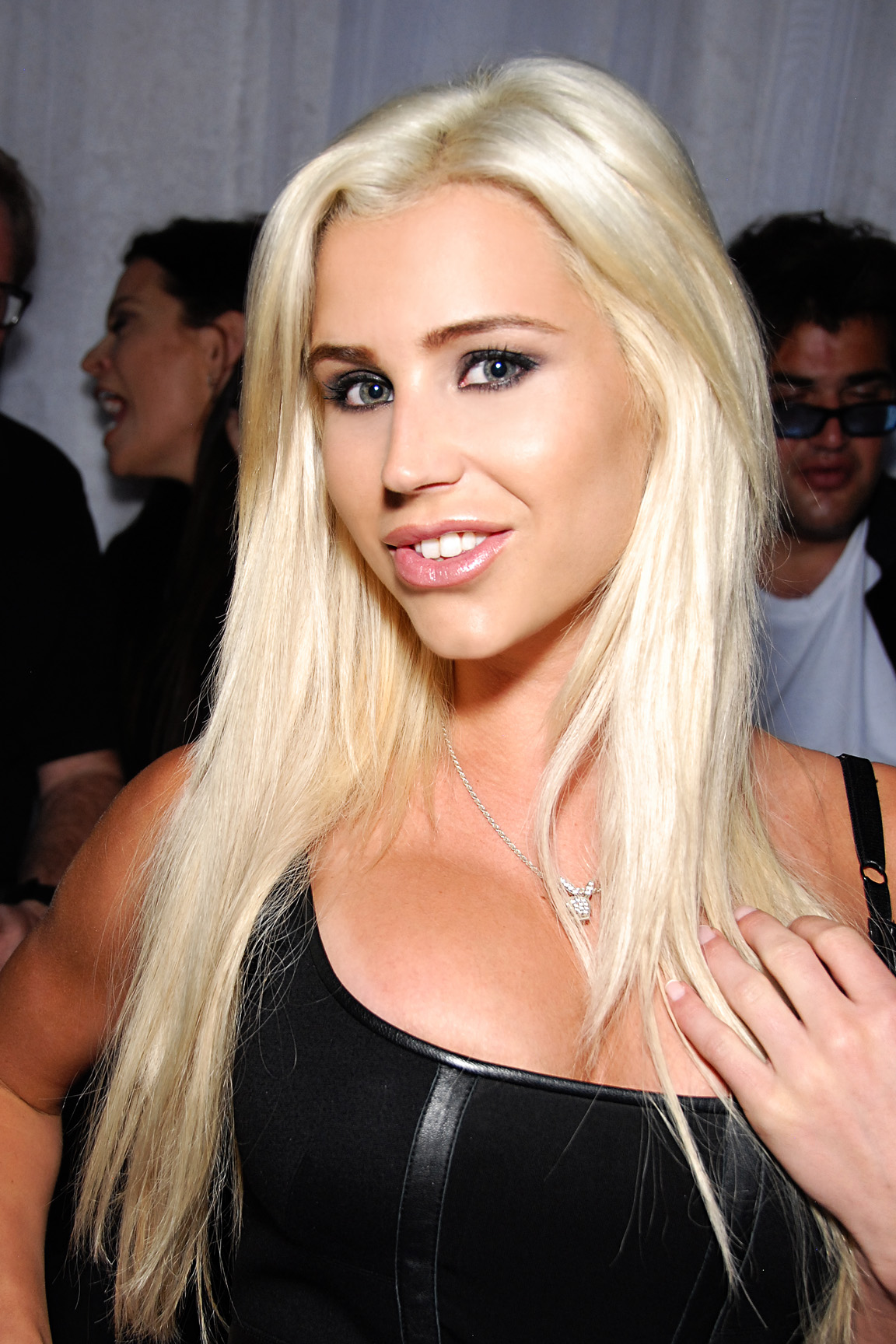
- Scott in 2011

Personal details
- Born: April 4, 1989 (age 37) St. Petersburg, Florida, U.S.
- Height: 5 ft 4 in (163 cm)

Spencer Scott (born April 4, 1989) is an American model who is the Playboy Playmate for October 2007. She is a native of Atlanta who moved to Los Angeles after graduation from high school in 2007. Scott appeared on The Girls Next Door as Holly Madison's assistant. After becoming a Playboy Playmate, she shifted to girl/girl hardcore pornography.

== November ==
Lindsay Wagner

Personal details
- Born: March 14, 1988 (age 38) Omaha, Nebraska, U.S.
- Height: 5 ft 8.5 in (174 cm)

Lindsay Wagner (born March 14, 1988) is an American model who is Playboy's Playmate for November 2007. Her centerfold was photographed by Stephen Wayda. She is a former ring gal for Omaha Fight Club. She graduated from Omaha Bryan High School in 2006.

Wagner appeared as herself on the reality TV series "The Girls Next Door"

== December ==
Sasckya Porto
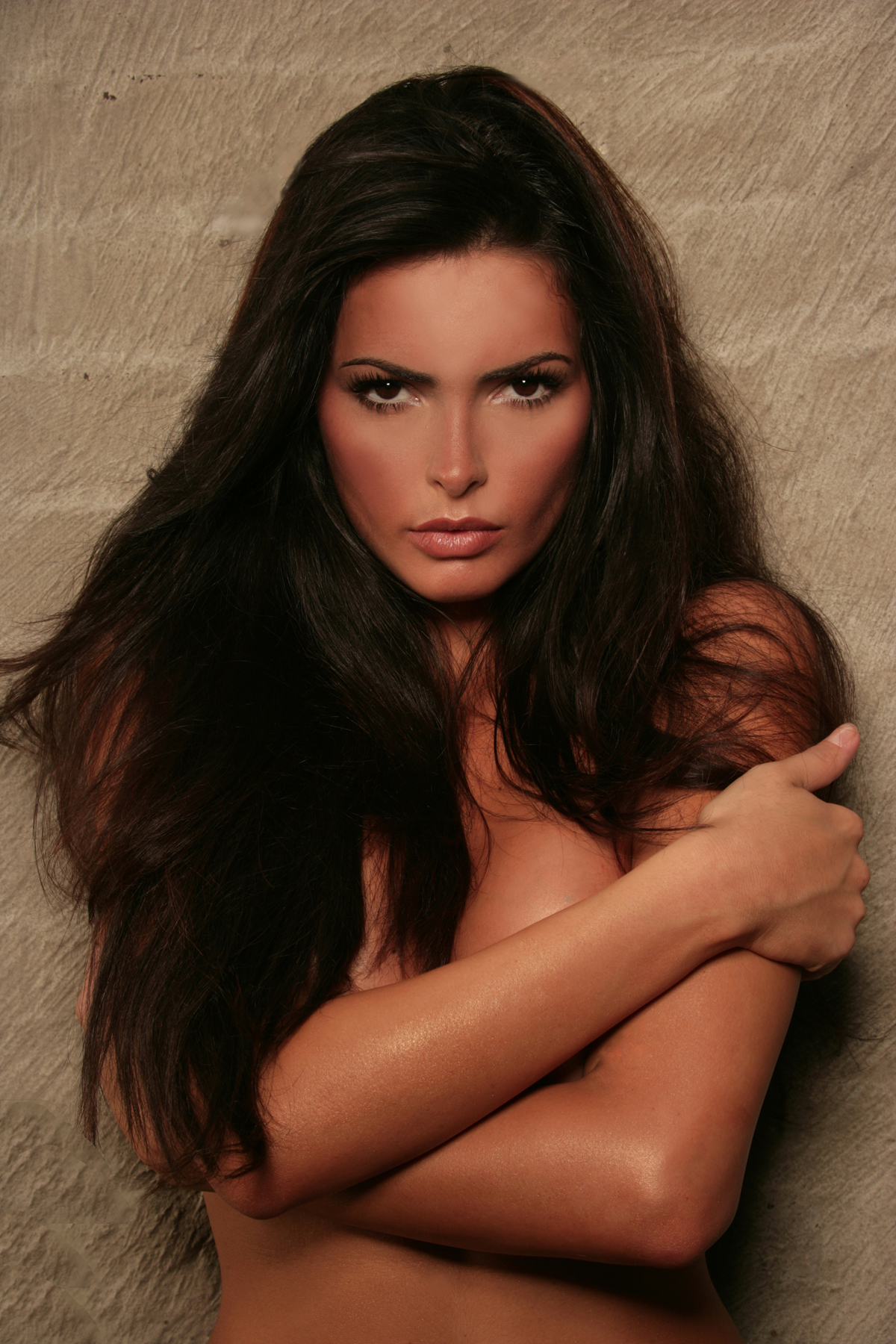

Personal details
- Born: 31 October 1984 (age 41) Pernambuco, Brazil
- Height: 5 ft 10 in (1.78 m)

Sasckya Porto (born 31 October 1984) is a model. She was born in Pernambuco, Brazil and is Playboy's Playmate of the Month for December 2007.

== See also ==
- List of people in Playboy 2000–2009

Jayde Nicole	Heather Rene Smith	Tyran Richard	Giuliana Marino	Shannon James	Brittany Binger
Tiffany Selby	Tamara Sky	Patrice Hollis	Spencer Scott	Lindsay Wagner	Sasckya Porto
