= McMillan Magnet Center =

Location
- 3802 Redick Avenue; Omaha, Nebraska 68112; United States
- Coordinates: 41°19′06″N 95°58′14″W

Information
- Type: Public, magnet middle school
- School district: Omaha Public Schools
- Principal: Dr. Monica Green
- Grades: 6-8
- Colors: Blue and gold
- Mascot: Monarch (lion)
- Website: http://www.ops.org/middle/mcmillan/

McMillan Magnet School, formerly known as McMillan Junior High School, is a middle school located at 3802 Redick Avenue in North Omaha, Nebraska, United States. McMillan is a magnet school, focusing on technology, mathematics, engineering, and communication arts.

== History ==
McMillan opened in 1958, and its students soon chose the Monarch (Lion) as the school mascot. Named for Edward E. McMillan (1875–1943), the first principal of North High School, McMillan became Omaha Public Schools' first magnet junior high school in the 1980s. Originally a school for seventh, eighth and ninth grade students, in 1989 ninth graders were permanently moved to high schools throughout the city.

== Features ==
As a magnet school, McMillan features special courses in computers and mathematics.

The name of the school was changed to McMillan Magnet Center in the late 1990s.

The school completed a $13 million renovation project in 2003, including a library/media center, technology and living laboratories, computer labs, and an indoor and outdoor athletic complex. McMillan also offers a program for gifted and talented students.

== See also ==
- List of public schools in Omaha, Nebraska
