= Kellom Elementary School =

Location
- 1311 North 24th Street; Omaha, Nebraska 68112; United States
- Coordinates: 41°16′17″N 95°56′46″W

Information
- Type: Public elementary school
- School district: Omaha Public Schools
- Grades: Pre-K-6
- Website: www.ops.org/elementary/kellom

Kellom Elementary School, formerly the Paul Street School, is a public school located at 1311 North 24th Street in the Near North Side neighborhood of Omaha, Nebraska, United States. Still maintaining a largely African American student body population, the school was regarded as a "black school" in pre-Civil Rights Movement-era Omaha. Alumni of Kellom include Fred Astaire, Gale Sayers, Bob Gibson, and Brenda Council.

== About ==
Kellom School has 425 students in pre-kindergarten through sixth grade. The school has a variety of special programs, including English as a Second Language programs and classes for gifted students. There is an active Parent Teacher Association, and numerous community partners, including local businesses and universities.

Kellom has 380-400 students. 75% are African American, Caucasian, and Hispanic, and the remaining 25% are Sudanese, Asian, Native American and Somali. 88% of the current population receive free or reduced lunches qualifying Kellom as a schoolwide Title I school. The mobility rate is 67.5%, which offers unique learning challenges for the staff and students.

The school has a basketball program sponsored by the City of Omaha's Parks and Recreation Department.

== History ==
The Paul Street School was the original frame building erected in 1892 at the corner of 24th and Paul. The present Kellom opened in 1952 as a "community school", and included a community center as well as regular facilities. It was the first new school in the Omaha district in 27 years. It was named after John H. Kellom, an early educator who arrived in Omaha in 1857 and was on the first Omaha Board of Education in 1859. Kellom was on the board of trustees for Omaha High School, and throughout his career in Omaha worked as a teacher, a principal, and the first superintendent of schools in the city.

According to author Tillie Olsen, in the 1920s the school hosted a number of classes for adult immigrants in the neighborhood. In the early 1950s renowned Civil Rights Movement leader Whitney Young was the leader of the Urban League of Nebraska, based in North Omaha. Young was well known in the neighborhood for operating basketball and other community outreach programs at the new Kellom School.

In 1964 Kellom participated in the Assistance for Interculturally Deprived program, and later in the Title I program of the U.S. Department of Education. Kellom became the site of the first free breakfast program in Nebraska in 1967. The school was also targeted by a number of school desegregation plans from the 1970s through the 2000s. Since 1999 Omaha Public Schools has included the school in a special program that ensures small class sizes at both the primary and intermediate grades.

== Alumni ==
- Michael Anania, poet, novelist, and essayist
- Fred Astaire, dancer, actor, singer
- Bob Boozer, basketball player
- Brenda Council, politician and ex-lawyer
- Bob Gibson, baseball player
- Johnny Rosenblatt, civic leader and mayor
- Gale Sayers, American football player

== See also ==
- List of public schools in Omaha, Nebraska
