= Monmouth Park School =

- Formerly listed on the U.S. National Register of Historic Places
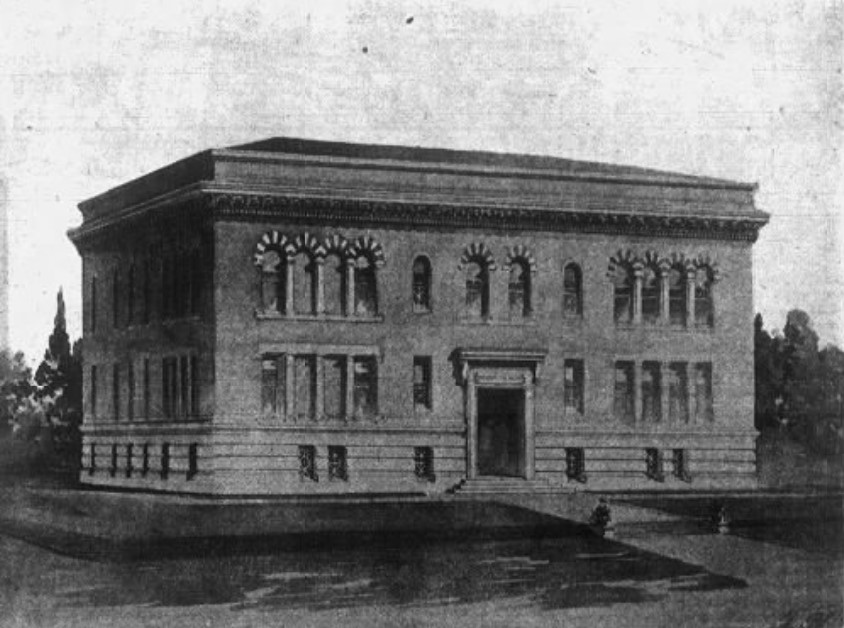
- Monmouth Park School in 1903.

- Location within Nebraska Location within the United States
- Location: North Omaha, NE
- Coordinates: 41°18′00″N 95°57′43″W
- Built: 1903
- Architect: Thomas Rogers Kimball
- Architectural style: Second Renaissance Revival
- Demolished: 1995
- NRHP reference No.: 83003988

Significant dates
- Added to NRHP: December 15, 1983
- Removed from NRHP: March 5, 2018

Monmouth Park School was a public elementary school located at 4508 North 33rd Street in North Omaha, Nebraska, United States.

The building was designed in the Second Renaissance Revival style by Thomas Rogers Kimball, regarded by many as Nebraska's finest architect. It was constructed in 1903.

In 1981, it was closed by the Omaha School District, which proposed to raze it. However, the private NJD Partnership bought the building and, with support from city and federal grants, renovated it in 1983 as a 30-unit apartment building under the name of Monmouth Park Place. In 1983, the building was listed in the National Register of Historic Places.

In 1993, the building's roof was seriously damaged by a windstorm. As tenants departed, the building fell into the hands of transients and vandals. It was condemned by the city in December 1993.

The demolition of the building was delayed in February 1995, when the Omaha City Council voted to grant NJD additional time to seek new investors for another renovation. However, the effort failed. An assistant city planning director pronounced the building "not only a health hazard, but also a safety hazard in the neighborhood". It was razed in May 1995. It was delisted from the National Register in 2018.

== See also ==
- List of public schools in Omaha, Nebraska
