= Duchesne Academy of the Sacred Heart (Nebraska) =

Scbool in Omaha, Nebraska

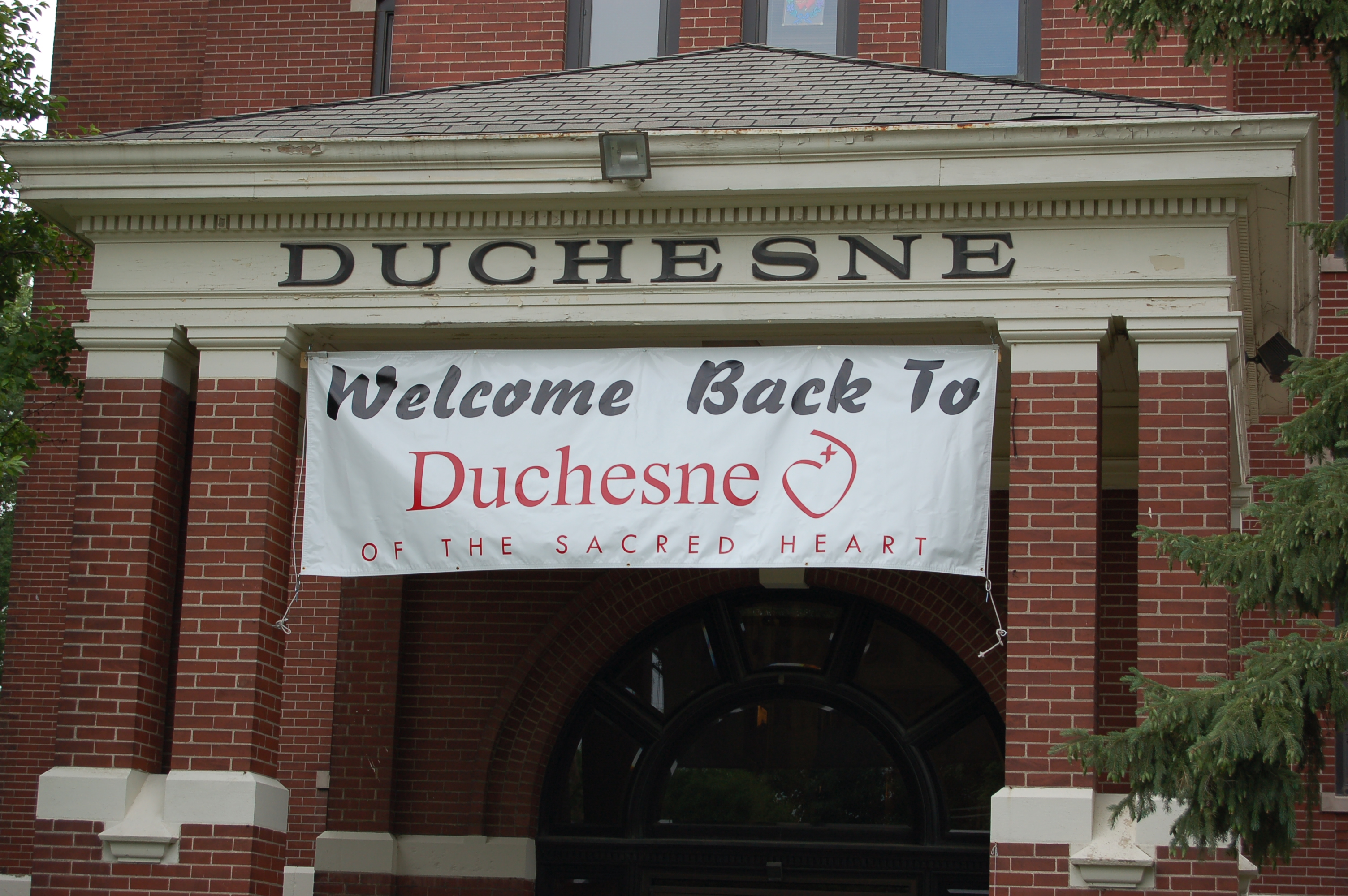

Location
- 3601 Burt Street; Omaha, (Douglas County), Nebraska 68131-1945; United States; 41°16′0″N 95°58′1.5″W

Information
- Type: Private, all-girls
- Religious affiliation: Roman Catholic
- Established: 1881
- Principal: Laura Hickman
- Head of school: Meg Brudney
- Grades: 9–12
- Enrollment: 326 (as of 2023)
- Colors: Red, white and black
- Team name: Cardinals
- Tuition: $15,925
- Website: duchesneacademy.org

Duchesne Academy of the Sacred Heart, located at 3601 Burt Street in the Midtown area of Omaha, Nebraska, United States, is a Catholic, college-preparatory high school for girls run by the Religious of the Sacred Heart. The institution previously included a college which was operated from 1908 to 1968. Today Duchesne is home to the high school and a co-ed preschool. While it is located within the Archdiocese of Omaha, it is an independent institution.

== History ==
Duchesne Academy was established in Omaha in 1881 and is named in honor of St. Rose Philippine Duchesne, one of the first women to join the Society of the Sacred Heart. St. Rose Philippine came to the United States from France in the early 19th century and established the first Sacred Heart school in St. Charles, Missouri. Duchesne is one of 24 schools in the Sacred Heart Network in the United States.

The institution previously included a college which was operated from 1908 to 1968

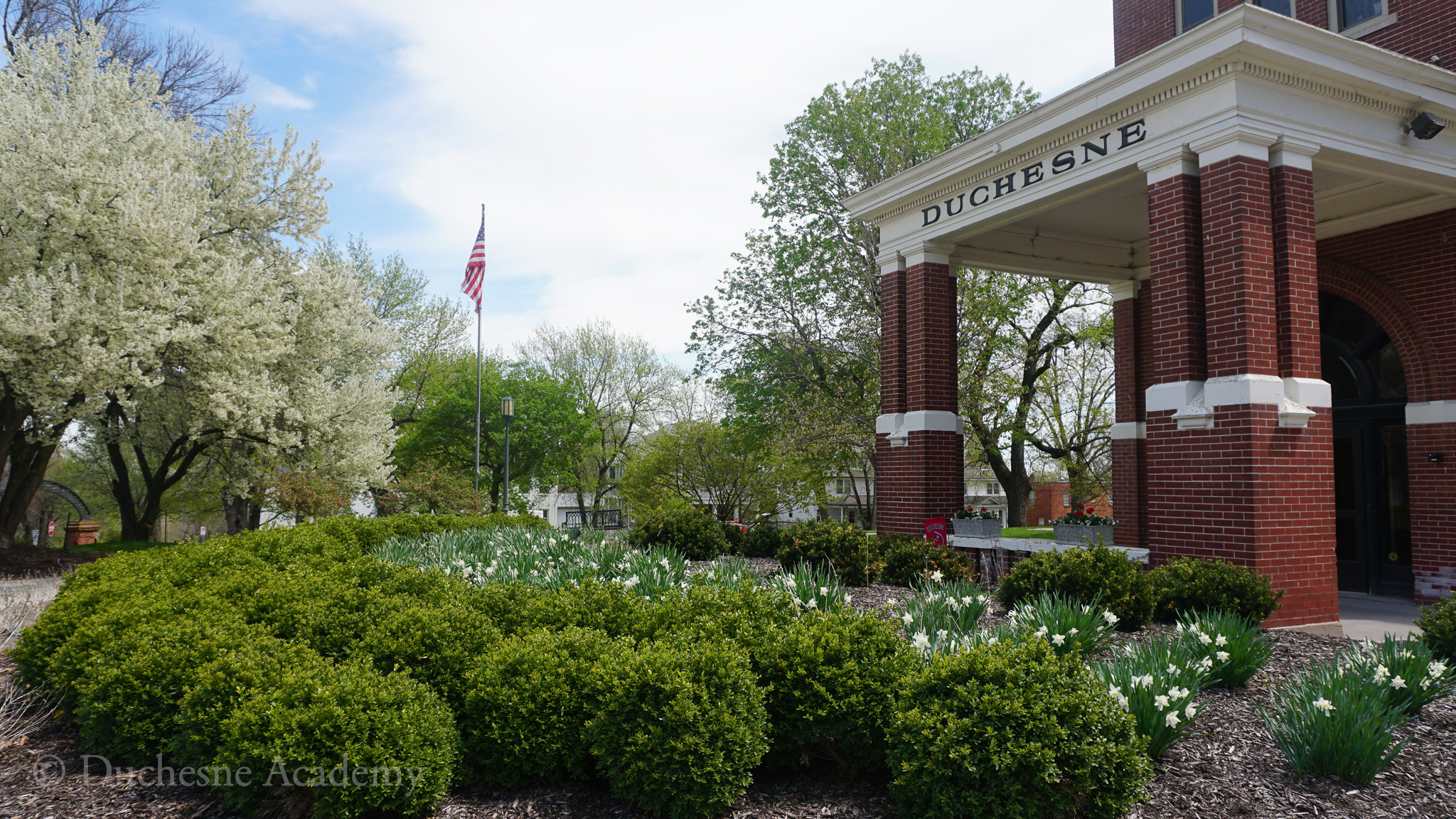

The high school enrolls approximately 85 students in each class, for a total of 340 in the school.

Duchesne has developed a nationally prominent mock trial program, winning the national championship in 2015 in the National High School Mock Trial Championship, held in Raleigh, North Carolina.

== Traditions ==
Duchesne celebrates several traditions that are common to all Sacred Heart schools. Each grade has its particular celebration. Freshmen hold a Teacher Recognition Ceremony, while sophomores celebrate Mater, where they recognize women who are models of the Virgin Mary in their lives. During Ring Ceremony, the senior class bestows class rings upon the juniors as a symbolic transfer of school leadership. In May, the seniors graduate at a ceremony at Saint Cecilia's Cathedral. At the end of the year, Prize Day and Honors Day recognize students for academic excellence and leadership, extracurricular activities, athletic accomplishments, and other non-academic awards, respectively.
