= Omaha North High School =

Public school in Omaha, Nebraska, United States

Omaha North High Magnet School

Location
- 4410 North 36th Street; Omaha, Douglas County, Nebraska 68111; United States; 41.2979°N 95.9674°W

Information
- School type: Public secondary school
- Established: 1924
- School district: Omaha Public Schools
- NCES School ID: 317482001416
- Principal: Christopher Humphries
- Teaching staff: 81.50 (on an FTE basis)
- Grades: 9 to 12
- Student to teacher ratio: 21.20
- Colors: Blue and gold
- Mascot: Vikings
- Team name: Omaha North High School Vikings
- Website: north.ops.org

Omaha North High Magnet School is a public high school located at 4410 North 36th Street in the city of Omaha, Nebraska. The school is a science, technology, engineering and mathematics (STEM) magnet school in the Omaha Public Schools district. North has won several awards, including being named a 2007 Magnet Schools of America "Magnet School of Excellence".

== History ==
=== 20th century ===
After a start to construction in 1922 at North 31st and Ames Avenues was hampered by unexpected groundwater, the present North High School was completed in 1924 at North 36th Street and Ames Avenue. Located on four acres, North opened as an eighth through twelfth grade school in September 1924, and had 650 students its first year. The building's first principal was Edward E. McMillan, who served until 1942. The junior high students were moved to other schools by 1929. The school began winning district and state awards in academic and athletic competitions in 1926, and in 1932, North High earned the top place at a national debate competition.

During World War II, 1,711 North graduates served in the United States military; 77 did not make it home. By 1945 the school's attendance doubled. In the late 1940s, the building was expanded to accommodate huge growth in the population of North Omaha. A music wing, cafeteria, gymnasium and more classrooms were added. The swimming pool was converted into a freshman study hall and library. In 1958, the late E. E. McMillan was honored as the namesake of the new nearby middle school, McMillan Magnet Center.

Overcrowding began to become a problem at North in the 1960s, and by the 1970s, more than 2,400 students were enrolled. The Omaha Public Schools initiated a desegregation plan in 1976, and in the 1980s, the temporary elimination of 9th grade at North led to decreased enrollment. North was designated a magnet school focused on math, science, and technology during that decade as well. In 1993, the school completed a $20 million renovation. Several nearby properties were bought and several additions expanded North's campus to its present twelve acres. The new student center and cafeteria, called the Viking Center, was heralded as a major development, along with a renovation of the library and new facilities that included a multipurpose physical education and athletics facility.

=== 21st century ===
In the early 2000s, North shifted its magnet focus to specialize in the fields of science, engineering and technology. To complement this focus, in 2010 a new four-story, 32,092-square foot addition was dedicated at North. It consists of science, media technology, and engineering classrooms and lab space, and a wrestling practice room in the basement. Students taking classes in North's engineering program helped design the new building, working with RDG Planning & Design to present and finish the plans. With this building, North became the first school in Nebraska to be certified under the Leadership in Energy and Environmental Design (LEED) for Schools, earning a Silver certification. Vrana Construction was the general contractor. Longtime principal Gene R. Haynes, who held the position since 2001 and had been an employee of the Omaha Public Schools for over fifty years, announced his retirement at the end of the 2019–2020 school year.

North is the only public high school in Omaha that does not have a stadium, and presently only has a football and soccer practice field and track with a small section of bleachers on the school grounds that is insufficient to accommodate the crowds that appear for many athletic events. To this end, North sometimes shares nearby Omaha Northwest High School's Kinnick Stadium, especially for "home" football games. In 2014, Haynes announced future plans to privately finance a 5,000 to 6,000-seat stadium to be built in the neighborhood around North High, with an expected cost of $8–$12 million. A local city councilman said the project would be "an important symbol of progress in North Omaha." In April 2025, Omaha mayor Jean Stothert and other city officials announced that private donations and a $2 million grant from the Nebraska Department of Economic Development would fund the reconstruction of the existing Butler-Gast YMCA and the construction of an adjacent football stadium for the high school. The stadium will be located across the street from the school on the east side of North 36th Street, with the new Butler-Gast YMCA building remaining on its former lot and relocating to its east side, bordering North 34th and Ames Avenues. The project timeline involves the YMCA closing in the fall of 2025 for demolition, with construction on both facilities expected to be completed in summer 2027 in time for the 2027-2028 school year.

== Demographics ==
According to the National Center for Education Statistics, as of the 2023–24 school year, Omaha North High School's students were 53 percent male and 47 percent female. There were 1,728 total students enrolled in grades nine through twelve. 825 students were African American, 379 were Hispanic, 354 were White, 110 were multiracial, 37 were Asian Americans, 21 were Native American, and 2 were Native Hawaiian or Pacific Islander. With 81.5 full-time teachers (FTE), there was a 21.20:1 teacher to student ratio.

According to U.S. News and World Report, as of 2015-16, 65% of students at the school were qualified as economically disadvantaged, and the on-time (four-year) graduation rate was 79%.

== Curriculum ==
North has won many state and national awards for curriculum innovation. Currently, the school day is extended by a 21st Century Community Learning Center grant from the U.S. Department of Education. North offers higher-level mathematics courses in Omaha Public Schools and is articulating for accreditation in career and technology education. The school has over 1,200 networked computers, and technology is pervasive in all curriculum areas. A wide variety of programming languages are offered, including C++, HTML, Visual Basic, and Java. All students and staff are issued email accounts. North's Academic Decathlon team placed third in the state during the 2005–2006 school year.

Omaha North High Magnet School is a certified Project Lead the Way high school. The Service Learning Academy through the University of Nebraska-Omaha has a partnership with North High.

== Athletics ==
=== Football ===
The Omaha North High School Vikings football team has enjoyed success, both in the past as well as recently. They won their first Nebraska state championship in 1929, and again in 1948, 1956, 1961, 1967, 2013, 2014 and 2017. In addition, the team was runner-up in 2012 and 2016. Dewey Wade was on the state football champion team in 1948 and the city champion football teams of 1949 and 1950. In 1961 and 1962, University of Nebraska Hall of Famer Bob Churchich was the quarterback.

=== State championships ===
State championships
Season	Sport	Number of championships	Year
Fall	Football	8	1929, 1948, 1956, 1963, 1967, 2013, 2014, 2017
Fall	Cross country, boys	2	1964, 1966
Fall	Tennis, boys	5	1962, 1963, 1964, 1965, 1966
Winter	Wrestling, boys	8	1951, 1985, 1990, 1993, 1994, 1995, 1999, 2014
Winter	Basketball, girls	1	1998
Winter	Ice hockey, boys (club team)	2	2002, 2003
Winter	Swimming, girls	1	1997
Spring	Track and field, boys	2	1970, 2006
Spring	Track and field, girls	2	2010, 2011
Total		31	

== Notable alumni ==
- Houston Alexander, mixed martial artist
- Scott Bostwick, 1979, Northwest Missouri Bearcats football coach
- Brandin Bryant, football player
- Paul Chan, artist, writer and publisher
- Dick Davis, football player
- Ester Dean, 2001, pop singer-songwriter
- Patrick Flanery, 1994, author
- Adam Fletcher, 1993, activist and author
- John A. Gale, Nebraska's secretary of state
- Neal Hefti, jazz musician, composer of Batman and The Odd Couple TV show themes
- Jeremy Horn, mixed martial artist
- Miguel Keith, Medal of Honor recipient (non-graduate)
- Charles R. Larson, four-star Navy admiral
- Preston Love, jazz musician
- Mike McGee, 1977, NBA basketball player with the Los Angeles Lakers
- Justin Patton, NBA basketball player and player for Hapoel Eilat of the Israeli Basketball Premier League, first-round selection in the 2017 NBA draft
- Niles Paul, 2007, NFL football player
- James Raschke, professional wrestler known as "Baron von Raschke"
- Monty Ross, 1975, film producer and director
- Rainbow Rowell, 1991, author
- Marques Sigle, 2020, NFL football player
- Q. Smith, musical theater actress
- Dan Warthen, 1971, Major League Baseball player and coach

== See also ==
- Education in North Omaha, Nebraska
- Mikey Gow
