= Technical High School (Omaha, Nebraska) =

Coordinates: 41°16′0.59″N 95°57′36.26″W

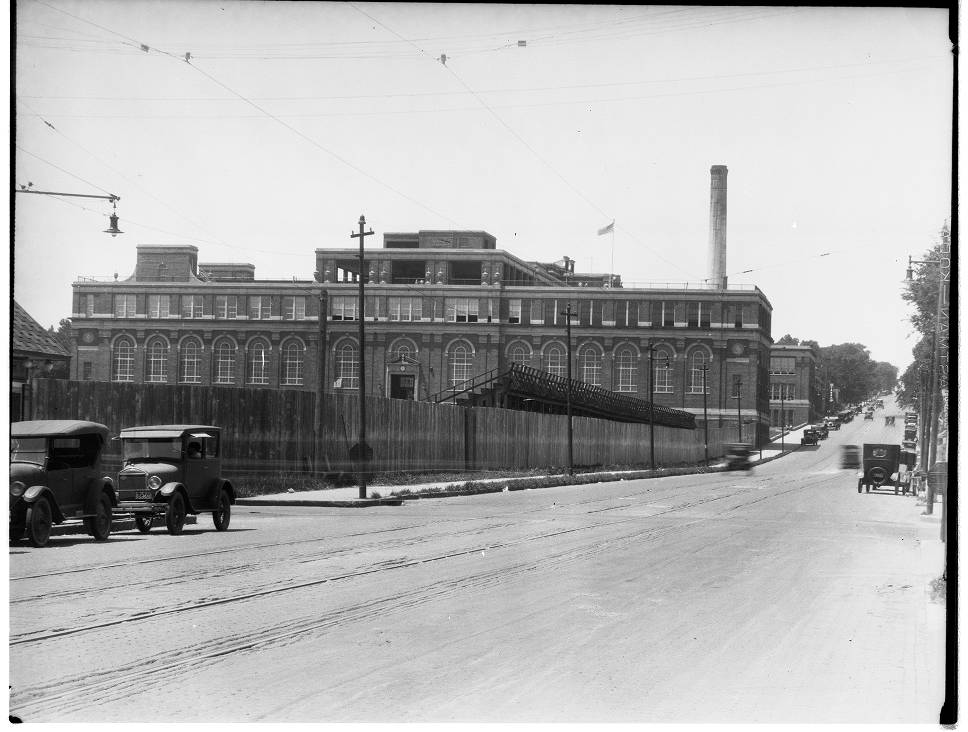
- Technical High School in July 1929.

Location
- 3215 Cuming Street; Omaha, Nebraska; United States

Information
- Type: Public vocational education high school
- Established: 1923
- Closed: 1984
- School district: Omaha Public Schools
- Grades: 10, 11, 12
- Enrollment: 3,684 (peak)
- Mascot: Trojans
- Nickname: Tech High

Technical High School, commonly referred to as Tech High, was a public high school that was located at 3215 Cuming Street in Omaha, Nebraska, United States. Opened in 1923, it was said to be the largest high school west of Chicago and the largest in the Omaha area before it was closed in 1984. Today the building serves as the headquarters of Omaha Public Schools.

== About ==
Technical High School was preceded by two similar schools operated by the Omaha school district. Originally established in 1903, the Commercial High School was an attempt by the district to serve the emergent service sector in the city. A later school called the Fort Street Special School for Incorrigible Boys was open from 1913 to 1917. It was intended to retain previously disengaged students by ensuring they had viable skills for the workforce upon graduation. Both of these schools were folded into Tech High when it opened.

=== Architecture ===
The architects of the building were Fred W. Clark & Edwin B. Clarke, whose firm also designed the Clifton Hill and Sherman Elementary Schools in Omaha.

The five-winged building and large athletic field occupied three city blocks between Burt and Cuming Streets, from 30th to 33rd Streets in North Omaha. The new school opened on October 15, 1923, with nearly 2,400 pupils. By 1940 enrollment had reached 3,684.

As a high school focused on technical education, Tech had many amenities designed to teach students in specific areas. It had two large gymnasiums and a swimming pool, which was for many years the only pool in any Omaha public school. The roof of the building featured a deck with a canopy that housed an exercise area.

An entire floor was dedicated to classrooms for home economics. There were extensive wood and metal shops, as well as scientific laboratories and a greenhouse. The building had 124 rooms. As early as 1947, there were 2,700 students and 100 teachers. Developed with high academic standards, the school was a forerunner in vocational high schools by offering students who largely chose not to go to college the opportunity to learn a trade or profession.

There was a high school radio station at Tech in the 1920s, whose call letters were KFOX.

The auditorium at the school was built to accommodate 2600 people (legal seating capacity was listed at 2120).

=== Culture ===
John Philip Sousa and his marching band appeared in October 1928. Cornelia Otis Skinner made her first high school appearance at Tech in January 1930. In November 1926 the Metropolitan Opera Company of New York gave a performance. Helen Hayes and Douglas Fairbanks Jr. also gave performances at Tech.

In 1966, an African American youth activism group called the Black Association for Nationalism Through Unity started a chapter at Tech and one of its leaders became a student government official. The group was later implicated along with the Omaha Black Panthers Party chapter and the National Committee to Combat Fascism in conspiring to kill an Omaha Police Department officer.

== Notable graduates ==
- John Beasley, actor and acting coach; co-starred in the Academy Award-winning film The Apostle
- Ron Boone, professional basketball player
- Bob Boozer, college and professional basketball player and Olympic gold medalist in 1960
- Sen. Ernie Chambers, 11th District, Nebraska State Legislature in 1955
- Captain Alfonza W. Davis, Tuskegee Airman
- James Dworak, former Omaha mayor
- Bob Gibson, Baseball Hall of Famer for the St. Louis Cardinals and Creighton University stand-out
- Mel Harder, professional baseball player
- Fred Hare, former college and professional basketball player
- Louis Hartz, former political scientist and influential proponent of the idea of American exceptionalism
- Jim Houston, national rodeo champion
- Roman Hruska, former US Senator
- Johnny Rodgers, former college football wingback, Heisman Trophy winner, and voted Nebraska's "Player of the Century"
- Johnny Rosenblatt, former Omaha mayor
- Jack Urban, former MLB player (Kansas City Athletics, St. Louis Cardinals)
- Brigadier General Kenneth Walker, US Army Air Corps, posthumous recipient of the Medal of Honor in World War II, and pioneer in military aviation
- Les Webster, college and professional football player for the Cincinnati Bengals
- Lucille Wilson, a three-time member of the US women's track team in the Olympics
- Phil Wise, college and professional football player
- Howard Kettelhut, Captain US Army, World War II, Bronze Medal, Silver Star, Purple Heart, credited with saving American Rangers during Battle of the Bulge

== Present ==
The school was closed in 1984. By 1990, the building was completely renovated for use as the Omaha Public Schools' central office. It also serves as a home for the Career Center and Adult Education programs, serving over 700 students daily.

Opera Omaha performed at Tech before they had facilities at the Orpheum Theater.

== See also ==
- Education in North Omaha, Nebraska

== Related publications ==
- Brookins, J. (1925) "Drama in a Technical High School," Peabody Journal of Education. 2(4) pp. 190–196
