= St. Peter Claver Cristo Rey Catholic High School =

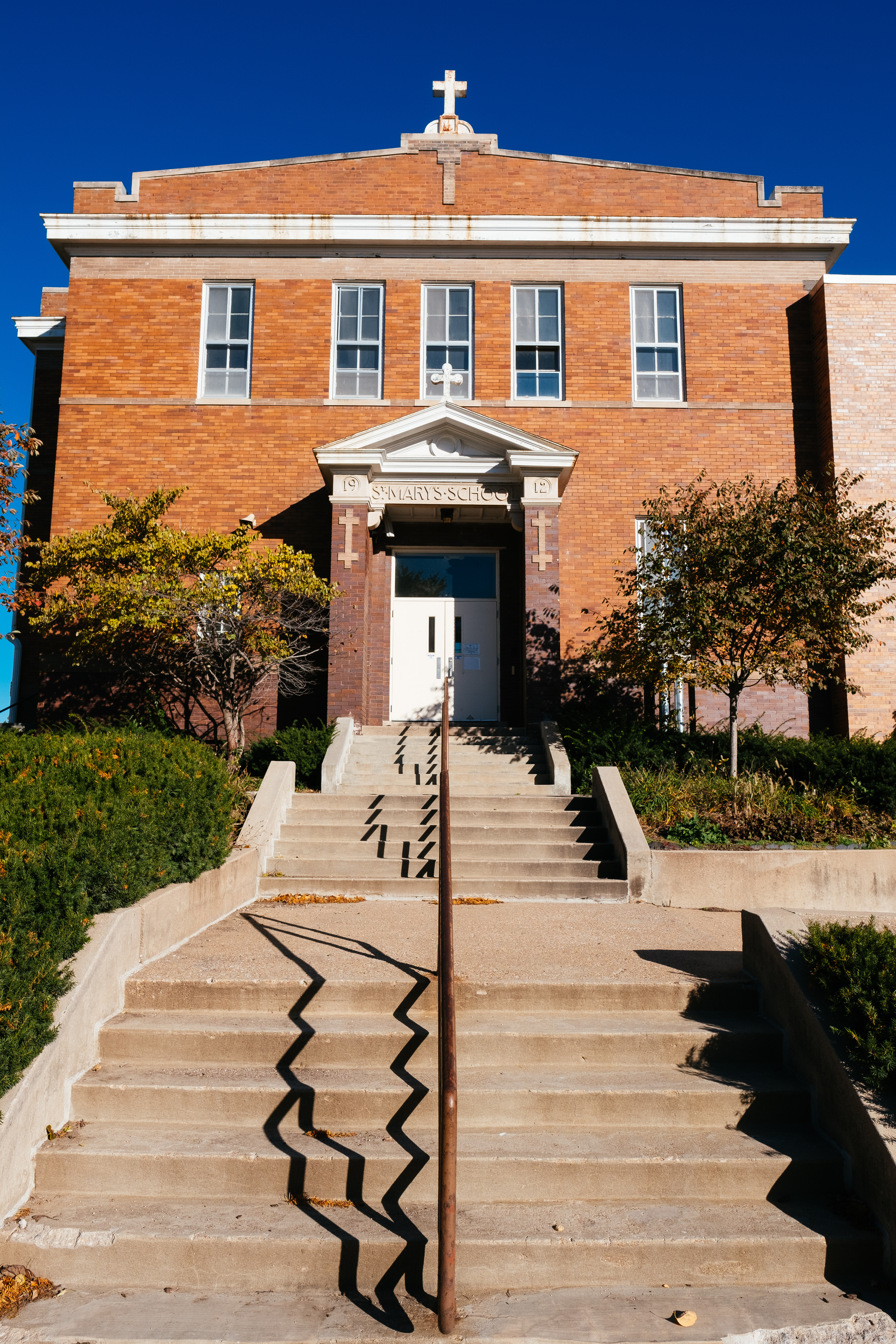

Location
- 5301 South 36th Street; Omaha, (Douglas County), Nebraska 68107; United States
- 41°12′16.31″N 95°58′2.35″W

Information
- Type: Private, coeducational
- Religious affiliation: Roman Catholic
- Established: 2007
- Principal: Susan Wilde
- Grades: 9–12
- Colors: Crimson red and cream
- Team name: Trailblazers
- Affiliation: Cristo Rey Network
- Website: www.spccristorey.org

St. Peter Claver Cristo Rey Catholic High School was a private, Roman Catholic high school in Omaha, Nebraska, United States. It was located in the Roman Catholic Archdiocese of Omaha.

== Background ==
St. Peter Claver Cristo Rey Catholic HS is an Omaha high school that opened in August, 2007. The St. Class of 2011 was its first and last graduating class. It was part of the Cristo Rey Network of high schools, the original being Cristo Rey Jesuit High School in Chicago's Pilsen neighborhood.

St. Peter Claver is known for having a very diverse variety of students. Located in the heart of south Omaha, St. Peter Claver (known to the students as SPC) rose to fame in 2008 because of its unique Hire4ED program.

Approximately only 200 students went to St. Peter Claver.

In 2006, priests in London, UK were thinking of a new way to teach and educate. They brainstormed the idea of a Catholic working high school. In 2007, priests flew to Omaha and started St. Peter Claver Cristo Rey Catholic HS. With the help of Father James Keiter, in August 2007 the school was opened.

The president of SPC was Father James Keiter. Its first principal was Leigh Florita, and after her departure, the second principal became Susan Wilde.

Rumors erupted in 2010 that St. Peter Claver would be shut down, all of which were denied by Fr. Keiter. The school remained open until February 11, 2011, when it was announced that it would indeed be closed.
