= Ralston Public Schools =

School district in Nebraska, United States

Ralston Public Schools (RPS, a.k.a. Douglas County School District 0054) is a school district headquartered in Ralston, Nebraska. It also serves southwestern sections of Omaha.

As of 2019 the district has over 270 teachers with full-time status and about 3,400 students.

== History ==
Jerry Riibe became superintendent circa 2010. In 2013 he announced he was leaving the district, and he became superintendent at the Muscatine Community School District in Iowa.

== Schools ==
Secondary schools

- Ralston High School
- Ralston Middle School

Primary schools

- Blumfield Elementary School
- Karen Western Elementary School
- Meadows Elementary School
- Mockingbird Elementary School
- Seymour Elementary School
- Wildewood Elementary School
