= Omaha South High School =

Public high school in Omaha, Nebraska, United States

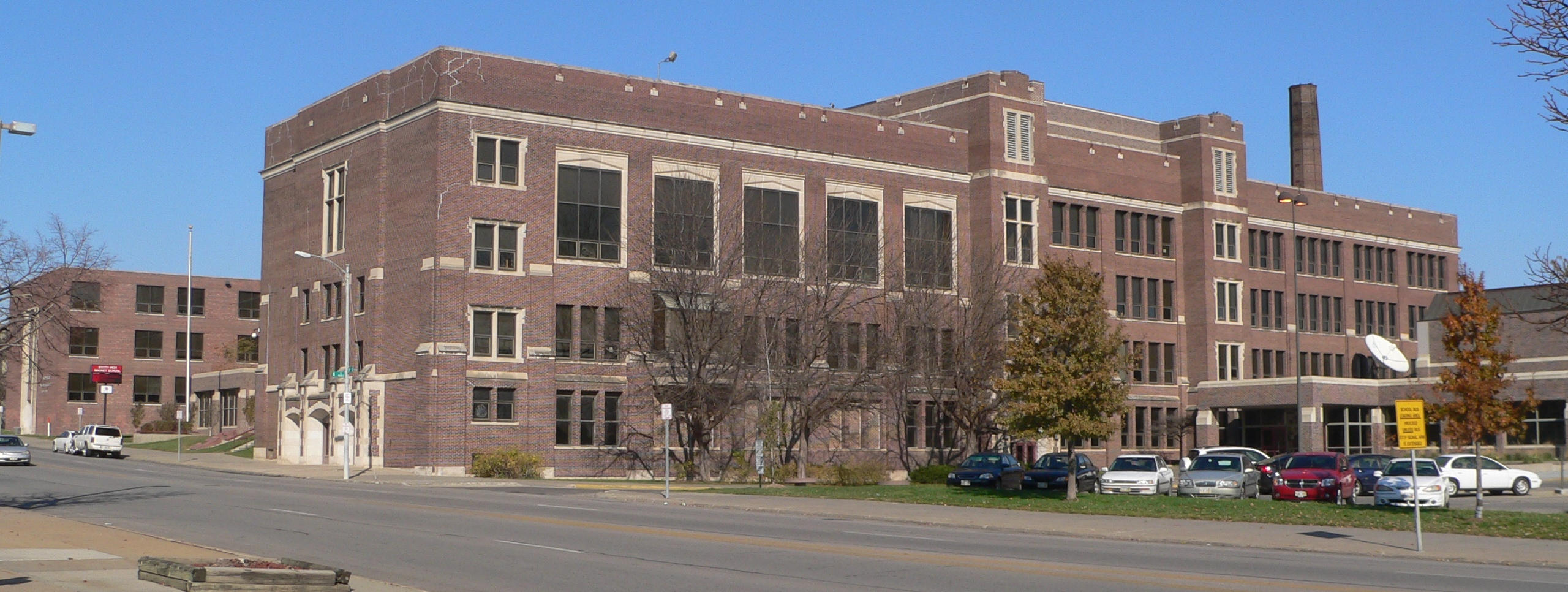
- Omaha South, seen from across 24th Street

Location
- 4519 S 24th Street; Omaha, Douglas County, Nebraska 68107; United States; 41°12′51″N 95°56′47″W

Information
- Former name: Omaha South Magnet High School
- School type: Public high school
- Motto: Go Packers!
- Established: 1887
- School district: Omaha Public Schools
- Superintendent: Matthew Ray
- Principal: Jodi Pesek
- Teaching staff: 138.94 (FTE)
- Grades: 9–12
- Gender: Coeducational
- Enrollment: 2,495 (2023–2024)
- Student to teacher ratio: 17.96
- Colors: Red and white
- Fight song: “Hail to the Varsity”
- Athletics conference: NSAA District A-1
- Mascot: Benny the Bull
- Nickname: South, Omaha South, SHS
- Team name: Packers
- Rival: Bryan High School
- Newspaper: South High Tooter
- Yearbook: SHS Yearbook
- Website: Omaha South Magnet H.S.

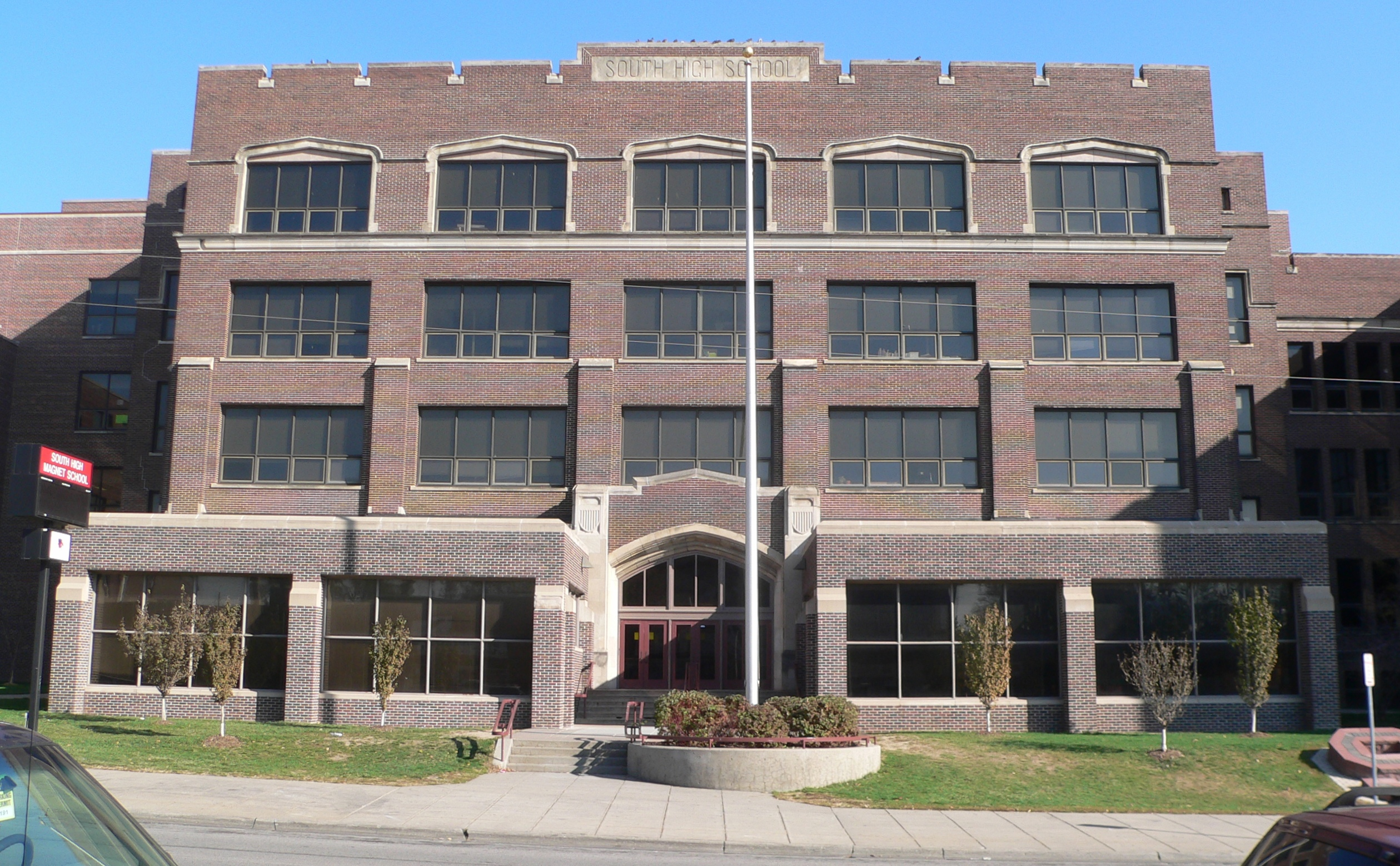
Main entrance

Omaha South High School is an information technology and visual/performing arts magnet school which educates students in grades 9–12. It is located in Omaha, Nebraska, United States. Built in the 1930s, it is one of the largest high school buildings in the state.

Students at Omaha South use laptop computers and palmtops as part of their daily classroom activity. The Visual/Performing Arts program offers students the opportunity to create and perform in theatre, music, art, and filmmaking. Community partnerships include Opera Omaha and the Omaha Community Playhouse.

== Extracurricular activities ==
Student Diversity in the South High, per U.S. News (2023-24)
1. Hispanic (85.9%)
2. White (8.20%)
3. Black (3.80%)
4. Two or More Races (1.00%)
5. Native American (0.70%)
6. Asian (0.40%)

=== Soccer ===
The 2013 Class A Boys Soccer State Championship, won by Omaha South High School against Creighton Prep (1-0) at Morrison Stadium, holds the current record as the highest attended soccer match in the State of Nebraska. The estimated attendance of this game was 8,200 people, beating the previous record of approximately 6,900 people held by the Creighton Men's Soccer team.

=== State championships ===
State championships
Season	Sport	Number of championships	Year
Fall	Cross country, boys'	1	1963
Fall	Football	3	1942, 1957, 1958
Winter	Wrestling, boys'	19	1931, 1932, 1933, 1935, 1936, 1937, 1943, 1947, 1948, 1952, 1956, 1957, 1958, 1959, 1960, 1962, 1963, 1966, 1967
Winter	Basketball, boys'	6	1937, 1944, 1960, 1990, 2016, 2019
Winter	Powerlifting, boys'	3	2006, 2007, 2008
Winter	Powerlifting, girls'	3	2015, 2016, 2017
Winter	Tennis, boys'	1	1965
Winter	Gymnastics, boys'	7	1975, 1976, 1977, 1978, 1980, 1981, 1983
Spring	Baseball	2	1941, 1973
Spring	Golf, boys'	1	1942
Spring	Soccer, boys'	4	2013, 2016, 2019, 2021
Total		50	

=== Poetry ===
Omaha South High Magnet school has an award-winning poetry slam team as the Packer poets won the 2019 Louder Than a Bomb poetry slam tournament that 40+ schools compete in. The same year a student won second place in the Individual Louder Than a Bomb poetry slam tournament. Omaha South's poetry slam team has consistently been ranked in the top 16 in the Midwest for the past 8 years being ranked #1 in 2015, and several poets from Omaha South High Magnet school had advanced in the Poetry Out Loud state finals.

== Notable alumni ==
- Chris Bober, professional football player
- Marlin Briscoe, football player, first starting black quarterback in the NFL
- Phil Cahoy, gymnast
- Leo J. Dulacki, decorated lieutenant general in the Marine Corps
- John Faiman, former Nebraska quarterback; former Bellevue West High School head football coach
- Noah Fant, professional football player
- Johnny Goodman, golfer, won U.S. Open in 1933, last amateur to win the title
- Jim Hartung, gymnast; on the 1984 US Olympic team, which won a gold medal
- Buddy Hunter, former Major League Baseball player (Boston Red Sox)
- Cedric Hunter, professional basketball player
- Ed Koterba, journalist
- Jeff Koterba, editorial cartoonist, Omaha World Herald
- Oudious Lee, football player
- Darrell Mudra, football coach
- Gail O'Brien, football player in the NFL for the Boston Redskins
- Johnny Owen, first four-sport letter winner at South and member of the Nebraska Legislature
- Dave Rimington, college and professional football player
- James R. Young, chairman and CEO of Union Pacific Railroad
- Margo Juarez, the first Latina to serve in the Nebraska Legislature (2025 - present)

== See also ==
- Omaha Public Schools
- South Omaha
