= Omaha Northwest High School =

Omaha Northwest High Magnet School

Location
- 8204 Crown Point Avenue; Omaha, Nebraska; United States; 41°18′53″N 96°02′26″W

Information
- Type: Public high school
- Established: 1971 as Omaha Northwest High School
- School district: Omaha Public Schools
- Principal: Barry Thomas
- Teaching staff: 74.75 (FTE)
- Grades: 9–12
- Enrollment: 1,517 (2026–2027)
- Student to teacher ratio: 21.5
- Colors: Navy, scarlet and old gold
- Mascot: Huskies
- Website: northwest.ops.org

Omaha Northwest High Magnet School at 8204 Crown Point Avenue in northwest Omaha, Nebraska, United States, is located on a 61-acre (25 ha) campus. Construction was completed in 1971. Renovations were completed in 2004, adding several classrooms and improving the choral and band facilities. Further renovations to modernize the school were completed before the start of the 2018-2019 school year, adding a newly erected atrium entrance with a vestibule, upgrades to the schools office, administrative and counseling centers, a commons area, additional classrooms, an additional auxiliary gymnasium, a weight room, a designated room for the schools wrestling program, as well as other infrastructural improvements. Northwest High is one of nine public high schools in the Omaha Public School District. Special features within the building include an auditorium center, a 2,200 seat gymnasium with two balcony areas for physical education instruction and interscholastic athletics, and the latest equipment for students in specialized areas such as computer technology, art, business, mathematics, industrial technology and science. However, while the school has swim teams, the building has no pool.

Northwest's colors are scarlet, navy, and old gold. Its mascot is Avalanche, the Husky. The current principal of Omaha Northwest High Magnet is Mr. Barry Thomas

== Shooting ==
On September 10, 2024, at 12:23 p.m, a 14-year-old boy, identified as Ramone Jefferson, shot and wounded a 15-year-old boy in the torso on school grounds. Jefferson was detained half an hour later. Eight nearby schools were placed on lockdown after the shooting for safety.

Jefferson was charged as an adult with first-degree assault, use of a weapon to commit a felony and possession of a gun on school grounds, and was set at a $275,000 bond. Jefferson will be required to wear a GPS monitor if he makes bond.

== Athletics ==
=== State championships ===
State championships
Season	Sport	# of championships	Year(s)
Winter	Basketball, boys'	2	1979, 1985
Spring	Baseball	6	1982, 1983, 1984, 1985, 1989, 1994
Total		8	

== Notable alumni ==
- Tyrie Ballard, cast member on The Real World: Denver
- Brad Beckman, former NFL tight end for the New York Giants and the Atlanta Falcons
- Damon Benning, former Nebraska Cornhuskers running back (class of 1992)
- John Carroll, member of Survivor: Marquesas
- John Ewing Jr., mayor of Omaha
- Ron Kellogg, former NBA player and former Kansas Jayhawks basketball star
- Zach Kroenke, former MLB player (Arizona Diamondbacks and Washington Nationals)
- Kevyn Morrow, actor
- Gregg Olson, former Major League Baseball American League Rookie of the Year in 1989
- Patrick Peirce, former college baseball player: Indian Hills CC class of 1982 comedian-writer
- Shane Powers, contestant on Survivor: Panama
- Timothy Prince and Thomas Prince, former college basketball players Iowa and Southeast Juco class of 1984
- Lee Terry, United States House of Representatives congressman
- Harold Waddell, 2006, 2007, 2008 and 2009 NAHA Pro Hillclimb national champion (class of 2000)

== See also ==
- Omaha Public Schools
