= Omaha Bryan High School =

Location
- 4700 Giles Road; Omaha, Nebraska; United States; 41°10′40″N 95°59′06″W

Information
- Type: Public high school
- Motto: "Academics, Activities, and Athletics"
- Established: c.1964
- School district: Omaha Public Schools
- Principal: Anthony Clark-Kaczmarek
- Staff: 85.50 (FTE)
- Grades: 9-12
- Gender: Coeducational
- Enrollment: 1,600 (2023–2024)
- Student to teacher ratio: 18.71
- Colors: Green and gold
- Mascot: Billy the Bear
- Website: bryan.ops.org

Omaha Bryan High School is a public high school located in Bellevue, Nebraska, United States. It is a part of Omaha Public Schools.

== History ==
Omaha Public Schools built Bryan Senior High as part of the school complex to meet increasing enrollments. The current building for William Jennings Bryan Senior High School was completed in 1971. The school was named after the Nebraska politician. The school's backstory dates to 1964, when the first students entered what is now the Bryan Middle School building, which was originally designed as a junior-senior high complex. From there, the first senior class graduated in 1968.

In 1993, the school celebrated its 25th anniversary by burying a time capsule intended for opening 25 years later; it was opened in April 2022. From 2000 to about 2005, Bryan went through some new renovations and additions. In 2004, the school had a new section built, along the south side, which houses four new classrooms. Four cottages (portables) are outside the northwest of the building, and in 2001, six more were added outside the northeast side. At that time, a weight room was also added to the upper gym, through the efforts of Dave and Carol Van Metre. Currently the other side is used as a practice area by the wrestling team. In 2004, two additional cottages were added on the west side of the building. As of about 2001, Bryan High became a member of the AOF (Academy of Finance).

The school was on a normal class schedule before the fall of 1994, with classes being year-long. Block scheduling (4 x 4) was then created, with a 13-minute "Advisement" period at the start of each school day. Students attend four blocks and Advisement per day. Four lunch periods run during 3rd block to accommodate the student population. Each block is 90 minutes long. In August 2012, the schedule was changed to block scheduling with "A" and "B" (alternating) classes.

In 2007 Bryan High School added new trees along the front of the building and stones to sit on. The library also went through changes; a section was transformed into rooms for assistant principals, and its entryway was extended into double doors. As part of the 2016 and 2018 Omaha Public Schools Bond issue, a new front entrance with Administration offices, along with a secondary gym and revamping of the former Main Administrative offices into the Athletic and other Administrators offices. At the same time was the addition of the Bryan Urban Agriculture Career Academy's two classrooms and greenhouse, along with a warehouse and classrooms for the Transportation, Distribution and Logistics Career Academy—all from private donations and not OPS Bond Issue funding.

Bryan High's current enrollment averages 1,700 students, and there are approximately 90 faculty members.

== Athletics ==
=== State championships ===
State championships
Season	Sport	Number of championships	Year
Fall	Cross Country, boys'	1	1968
Winter	Basketball, girls'	1	1981
Winter	Gymnastics, girls'	1	1978
Total		3	

== Notable alumni ==
- Ken Clark, former NFL running back and 8th round pick in the 1990 NFL draft
- SA Martinez, Douglas Vincent Martinez, vocalist and DJ in the band 311
- P-Nut, Aaron Charles Wills, bass guitarist in the band 311
- Lindsay Wagner, Playboy Playmate, November 2007
- Terence Crawford, professional boxer-World Champion/
- Jason Parker, National Rifle Team head coach, four-time Olympian, two-time World Champion, five-time Pan Am medalist, seven-time World Cup champion
- David R. Hogg, former U.S. military representative to the NATO Military Committee and Commanding General, U.S. Army Africa, awarded Defense Distinguished Service Medal
- Steve Pivovar, 45-year veteran sports journalist for Omaha World Herald
