= Omaha Public Schools =

School district in the State of Nebraska

Location
- Omaha, Nebraska, United States

District information
- Motto: Every student. Every day. Prepared for success.
- Grades: K-12
- Established: 1854
- Superintendent: Matthew Ray

Students and staff
- Students: about 52,000
- Staff: about 7,000
- Athletic conference: Metropolitan High School Activities Association

Other information
- Website: www.ops.org

Omaha Public Schools (OPS) is the main school district in Omaha, Nebraska, United States. The public school district serves about 52,000 students at over 80 elementary and secondary schools in Omaha. Its district offices are located in the former Tech High at 30th and Cuming Streets.

Within Douglas County the district includes much of Omaha. The district extends into parts of Sarpy County, where it includes portions of Bellevue.

== Key personnel ==
- Superintendent: Matthew Ray
- OPS Board Member President: Jane Erdenberger
- OPS Board Member Vice President: Kimara Snipes
- Subdistrict Board Member #1: Ricky Smith
- Subdistrict Board Member #2: Bri Full
- Subdistrict Board Member #3: Nick Thielen
- Subdistrict Board Member #4: Shavonna Holman
- Subdistrict Board Member #5: Gini Magnuson
- Subdistrict Board Member #6: Nancy Kratky
- Subdistrict Board Member #7: Jane Erdenberger
- Subdistrict Board Member #8: Almanza Zavala
- Subdistrict Board Member #9: Kimara Snipes

== Controversies ==
=== One City, One School District ===
Omaha Public Schools has a long tradition of segregation extending the entire history of the city from its first public school in the 1860s. In 1976, the U.S. Supreme Court ordered Omaha end school segregation and the district implemented a plan to bus students citywide in order to integrate schools. After that order was rescinded by SCOTUS in 1999, the district re-segregated.

On June 13, 2005, the Omaha Public Schools Board and Superintendent John Mackiel announced their intention to annex 25 schools within Omaha city limits to OPS. They are currently part of the Elkhorn Public Schools, Millard Public Schools and Ralston Public Schools districts. This announcement, based on three Nebraska statutes enacted in 1891 and 1947, is known as the "One City, One School District" plan.

This issue is highly controversial in Omaha. Supporters of the plan claim that a single school district is necessary to promote a cohesive Omaha community, ensure academic equity in all Omaha schools and prevent OPS from becoming locked into a declining property tax base. Opponents contend that Omaha-area residents should be able to choose from a number of school districts, and that the schools would become less efficient in one large school district. Discussions among the school districts have been unproductive; the issue figured prominently in the 2006 session of the Nebraska state legislature.

=== Split the District ===
The Nebraska legislature passed a bill (LB 1024) on April 13, 2006, that addresses the "One City, One School District" issues. The governor of Nebraska signed it later that day. It requires each metropolitan class city to have a "learning community" that consists of all of the school districts in the county where the city is located and any county that shares a border with the city. The learning community will be composed of voting representatives from each school district and will also include the superintendents of the districts as non-voting members. A learning community will be charged with helping to distribute property tax revenue more evenly throughout the school districts in its area.

In general, a learning community leaves the boundaries of school districts untouched. However, LB 1024 also calls for OPS to be broken into three separate school districts. The exact boundaries for three new Omaha school districts are to be chosen by the Omaha learning community. Their choices are limited by requirements of LB 1024 that each new district consist of contiguous high school attendance areas and include either two or three of the seven existing high schools. That allows about 20 ways to group the seven schools, depending on which adjacent high school attendance areas are grouped with the geographically most central area.

The three-district plan for OPS was proposed in amendment AM3142, introduced on the day the legislature first took up LB 1024. The suburban school districts reluctantly supported the three-district plan, seeing it as the most favorable to them of the bills proposed. The OPS leadership vehemently opposed the plan. AM3142 was approved on the day it was introduced by a counted vote of 33 to 6 with 10 senators not voting. Five days later a motion to reconsider AM3142 failed in a roll-call vote of 9 to 31 with 9 senators not voting. The roll call showed legislators from Omaha split six in favor of the three-district plan (Sens. Brashear, Brown, Chambers, Jensen, Pahls and Redfield) and five opposed (Sens. Bourne, Friend, Howard, Kruse and Synowiecki).

It was suspected that OPS may file a suit challenging the new law, but they did not. Instead, on May 16, 2006 the National Association for the Advancement of Colored People (NAACP) filed a suit against the governor and other Nebraska state officials charging that LB 1024, originally proposed by state senator Ernie Chambers, "intentionally furthers racial segregation." The NAACP lawsuit argues that because Omaha has racially segregated residential patterns, subdivided school districts will also be racially segregated, contrary to United States law.

According to April 2006, information published by Associated Press, the current Omaha public school district has approximately 45,000 students classified as 46 percent white, 31 percent black, 20 percent Hispanic, and 3 percent Asian or American Indian. News reports indicate that division of the city of Omaha into three new school districts, as ordered in April, 2006, by the Nebraska legislature and including current Elkhorn, Millard and Ralston public schools, is often expected to result in black students concentrated in a North Omaha district, white students in West Omaha district, and non-English speaking students in a South Omaha district. However, the law does not mandate such a result. Within its requirements, new districts may be drawn in several different ways.

LB 641, approved on May 7, 2007, repealed the requirement that the Omaha Public Schools district be broken up into three districts. Afterward, the governor suspended and repealed the law.

=== Finance ===
Omaha Public Schools is funded through a combination of state aid and local property tax revenue. In Nebraska, the use of tax increment financing (TIF) for redevelopment projects can affect the property tax base available to overlapping school districts, including OPS, because most of the incremental property tax growth within a TIF district is reserved for repaying project costs rather than supporting general school operations for the duration of the TIF. One prominent example is the Omaha Streetcar, which is planned to be financed largely through TIF within a downtown redevelopment district, leading critics to argue that future property tax growth in the area will be diverted away from Omaha Public Schools and other local services while the district is in effect.

== Schools ==
=== High schools ===
School	Mascot	Location	Grades	Enrollment	Opened
Benson Magnet High School	Mighty Bunnies	5120 Maple Street	9-12	1,570 (2022–23)	1904
Bryan High School	Bears	4700 Giles Road	9-12	1,634 (2022–23)	1971
Buena Vista High School	Bison	5616 L St	9-12	721 (2022–23)	2022
Burke High School	Bulldogs	12200 Burke Boulevard	9-12	1,915 (2022–23)	1965
Central High School	Eagles	124 North 20th Street	9-12	2,738 (2022–23)	1859
North Magnet High School	Vikings	4410 North 36th Street	9-12	1,796 (2022–23)	1924
Northwest High School	Huskies	8204 Crown Point Avenue	9-12	1,593 (2022–23)	1971
South Magnet High School	Packers	4519 South 24th Street	9-12	2,686 (2022–23)	1887
Westview High School	Wolverines	15800 Summit Plaza, Bennington	9-12	743 (2022–23)	2022

=== Middle schools ===
School	Mascot	Location	Grades	Enrollment	Opened
Alfonza W. Davis Middle School	Aviators	8050 North 129th Avenue	6-8	679 (2016–17)	2013
Alice Buffett Magnet Middle School	Bobcats	14101 Larimore Avenue	6-8	1,148 (2016–17)	2004
Beveridge Magnet Middle School	Bulldogs	1616 South 120th Street	6-8	616 (2016–17)	1963
Bryan Middle School	Bears	8210 South 42nd Street	7-8	829 (2016–17)	1964
King Science and Technology Magnet Middle School	Wildcats	3720 Florence Boulevard	5-8	614 (2016–17)	1973
Lewis & Clark Middle School	Trailblazers	6901 Burt Street	6-8	829 (2016–17)	1960
McMillan Magnet Middle School	Monarchs	3802 Redick Avenue	6-8	789 (2016–17)	1958
Monroe Middle School	Mustangs	5105 Bedford Avenue	6-8	823 (2016–17)	1956
Morton Magnet Middle School	Panthers	4606 Terrace Drive	6-8	759 (2016–17)	1965
Nathan Hale Magnet Middle School	Patriots	6143 Whitmore Street	6-8	594 (2016–17)	1965
Norris Middle School	Redbirds	2235 South 46th Street	6-8	1,123 (2016–17)	
R. M. Marrs Magnet Middle Center	Falcons	5619 South 19th Street	5-8	1,356 (2016–17)	1962
Bluestem Middle School	Mighty Meadowlarks	5910 S 42nd St	6-8		2023

=== Elementary schools ===
School	Mascot	Location	Grades	Enrollment	Opened
Adams Elementary School	Archers	3420 North 78th Street	K-5	303 (2016–17)	1925
Ashland Park-Robbins Elementary School	Timberwolves	5050 South 51st Street	PK-6	801 (2016–17)	1994
Bancroft Elementary School	Broncos	2724 Riverview Boulevard	PK-6	728 (2016–17)	
Beals Elementary School	Bobcats	1720 South 48th Street	PK-6	391 (2016–17)	1904
Belle Ryan Elementary School	Bulldogs	5616 L Street	PK-6	291 (2016–17)	
Belvedere Elementary School	Bobcats	3775 Curtis Avenue	PK-5	471 (2016–17)	1924
Benson West Elementary School	Bulldogs	6652 Maple Street	K-5	575 (2016–17)	1910
Boyd Elementary School	Beavers	8314 Boyd Street	PK-5	456 (2016–17)	1961
Castelar Elementary School	Cardinals	2316 South 18th Street	PK-5	637 (2016–17)	1886
Catlin Magnet Center		12736 Marinda Street	PK-6	203 (2016–17)	1966
Central Park Elementary School	Cougars	4904 North 42nd Street	PK-5	373 (2016–17)	1888
Chandler View Elementary School	Cougars	7800 South 25th Street	PK-6	696 (2016–17)	1969
Columbian Elementary School	Cobras	330 South 127th Street	PK-5	303 (2016–17)	1892
Conestoga Magnet Elementary School	Pioneers	2115 Burdette Street	PK-6	373 (2016–17)	1965
Crestridge Magnet Center	Vikings	818 Crestridge Road	PK-6	435 (2016–17)	1961
Dodge Elementary School	Wildcats	3520 Maplewood Boulevard	PK-5	388 (2016–17)	1964
Druid Hill Elementary School	Dragons	4020 North 30th Street	PK-5	292 (2016–17)	1917
Dundee Elementary School	Tigers	310 North 51st Street	K-6	551 (2016–17)	c. 1894
Edison Elementary School	Eagles	2302 North 97th Street	PK-6	462 (2016–17)	1966
Field Club Elementary School	Falcons	3512 Walnut Street	PK-5	669 (2016–17)	1916
Florence Elementary School	Foxes	4301 North 30th Street	K-5	259 (2016–17)	1889
Fontenelle Elementary School	Falcons	3905 North 52nd Street	PK-5	594 (2016–17)	
Forest Station Elementary School	Owls	1010 Childs Rd W	PK-5		2022
Franklin Elementary School		3506 Franklin Street	PK-6	253 (2016–17)	
Fullerton Magnet Center	Falcons	4711 North 138th Street	PK-4	526 (2016–17)	1998
Gateway Elementary School	Eagles	5610 South 42nd Street	PK-6	833 (2016–17)	2013
Gilder Elementary School	Bears	3705 Chandler Road	K-6	399 (2016–17)	1964
Gifford Park Elementary School	Groundhog	717 N. 32nd Street	Early childhood- 6	365 (2023–24	2019
Gomez-Heritage Elementary School	Timberwolves	5101 South 17th Street	PK-4	849 (2016–17)	2004
Harrison Elementary School	Tigers	5304 Hamilton Street	K-6	376 (2016–17)	1930
Hartman Elementary School	Hawks	5530 North 66th Street	PK-5	483 (2016–17)	1964
Highland Elementary School	Roadrunners	2625 Jefferson Street	PK-6	479 (2016–17)	
Indian Hill Elementary School		3121 U Street	K-6	637 (2016–17)	1890
Jackson Elementary School	Jaguars	620 South 31st Street	PK-6	222 (2016–17)	
Jefferson Elementary School	Jaguars	4065 Vinton Street	K-6	498 (2016–17)	1924
Joslyn Elementary School	Jaguars	11220 Blondo Street	PK-6	477 (2016–17)	1976
Kellom Elementary School		1311 North 24th Street	PK-6	515 (2016–17)	1952
Kennedy Elementary School	Tigers	2906 North 30th Street	PK-5	230 (2016–17)	1916
King Elementary School	Cubs	3706 Maple Street	PK-5	375 (2016–17)	1973
Liberty Elementary School	Superstars	2021 St. Mary’s Avenue	PK-6	745 (2016–17)	2004
Lothrop Magnet Center	Panthers	3300 North 22nd Street	PK-4	254 (2016–17)	
Masters Elementary School	Monarchs	5505 North 99th Street	K-5	271 (2016–17)	1970
Miller Park Elementary School	Simbas	5625 North 28th Avenue	PK-5	368 (2016–17)	1910
Minne Lusa Elementary School	Panthers	2728 Ida Street	PK-5	319 (2016–17)	1924
Mount View Elementary School	Lions	5322 North 52nd Street	PK-5	374 (2016–17)	1960
Oak Valley Elementary School	Owls	3109 Pedersen Drive	PK-6	302 (2016–17)	1963
Pawnee Elementary School	Cubs	7310 South 48th Street	PK-6	487 (2016–17)	1966
Picotte Elementary School	Pintos	14506 Ohio Street	K-4	324 (2016–17)	1992
Pine Elementary School	The Porcupines	10th and Pine Streets	PK-5	300 (2023-2024)	2022
Pinewood Elementary School	Panthers	6717 North 63rd Street	PK-5	222 (2016–17)	
Ponca Elementary School	Raccoons	11300 North Post Road	K-5	122 (2016–17)	1871
Prairie Wind Elementary School	Stallions	10908 Ellison Avenue	K-5	750 (2016–17)	1994
Rose Hill Elementary School	Rams	5605 Corby Street	K-5	298 (2016–17)	1907
Saddlebrook Elementary School	Green Wave	14850 Laurel Avenue	PK-5	482 (2016–17)	2009
Sherman Elementary School	Sharks	5618 North 14th Avenue	PK-5	205 (2016–17)	1888
Skinner Magnet Center	Sky Hawks	4304 North 33rd Street	PK-5	355 (2016–17)	1996
Spring Lake Magnet Center	Pumas	4215 South 20th Street	PK-5	836 (2016–17)	1975
Springville Elementary School	Eagles	7400 North 60th Street	K-5	399 (2016–17)	c. 1872
Standing Bear Elementary School	Cubs	15860 Taylor Street	PK-4	543 (2016–17)	2005
Sunny Slope Elementary School		10820 Old Maple Road	PK-5	424 (2016–17)	c. 1890
Wakonda Elementary School	Wildcats	4845 Curtis Avenue	PK-5	350 (2016–17)	
Walnut Hill Elementary School	Wildcats	4355 Charles Street	PK-6	483 (2016–17)	1888
Washington Elementary School	Wildcats	5519 Mayberry Street	PK-6	337 (2016–17)	1923
Western Hills Magnet Center	Wildcats	5616 L Street	K-6	256 (2016–17)	1953
Wilson Focus School	Lions	5141 F Street	3-6	232 (2016–17)	2008

=== Alternative/specialized schools ===
School	Mascot	Location	Grades	Enrollment	Opened
Blackburn Alternative High School	Pride	2606 Hamilton Street	9-12		
Dr. J. P. Lord School	Pandas	4444 Marinda Street	PK-12+		1938
Omaha Public Schools Career Center		3230 Burt Street	10-12		
Parrish Alternative School	Panthers	4315 Cuming Street	7-12		

== See also ==
- Historical schools in North Omaha
- Historical schools in East Omaha
- Education in Omaha, Nebraska
- Education in North Omaha
