= List of African-American historic places in Omaha, Nebraska =

This list of African American historic places in Omaha, Nebraska features some sites on the National Register of Historic Places (NRHP) as independent sites or as part of larger historic district. Others have been designated Omaha Landmarks (OL).

== Places ==
=== Community places ===
- Jewell Building - NRHP
- John Beasley Theater (no longer in operation)
- Love’s Jazz and Art Center
- North 24th Street
- 24th and Lake Historic District - NRHP

=== Economic places ===
- Carver Savings and Loan Association
- Fair Deal Cafe - Demolished
- Omaha Star building - NRHP
- Webster Telephone Exchange Building (Great Plains Black History Museum) - NRHP

=== Neighborhoods ===
- Kountze Place
- Miller Park
- Near North Side
- Prospect Hill
- Saratoga

=== Churches ===
- Calvin Memorial Presbyterian Church - NRHP
- Holy Family Catholic Church - NRHP
- Pearl Memorial United Methodist Church - Closed
- Sacred Heart Catholic Church - NRHP
- St. John's African Methodist Episcopal Church - NRHP
- Zion Baptist Church

=== Schools ===
- Central High School
- Howard Kennedy School
- Kellom School
- Lake School - Demolished
- Long School - Demolished
- Lothrop School - Rebuilt
- North High
- Tech High

=== Houses ===
- Broomfield Rowhouse - NRHP
- Harry Buford House - NRHP
- Lizzie Robinson House - NRHP
- Logan Fontenelle Housing Projects - Demolished
- Malcolm X House Site - NRHP
- Strehlow Terrace/Chambers Court - NRHP

== See also ==
- African Americans in Omaha, Nebraska
- Architecture in Omaha, Nebraska
- History of North Omaha, Nebraska
