= 24th and Lake Historic District =

Coordinates: 41°16′54″N 95°56′49″W

- Omaha Neighborhood
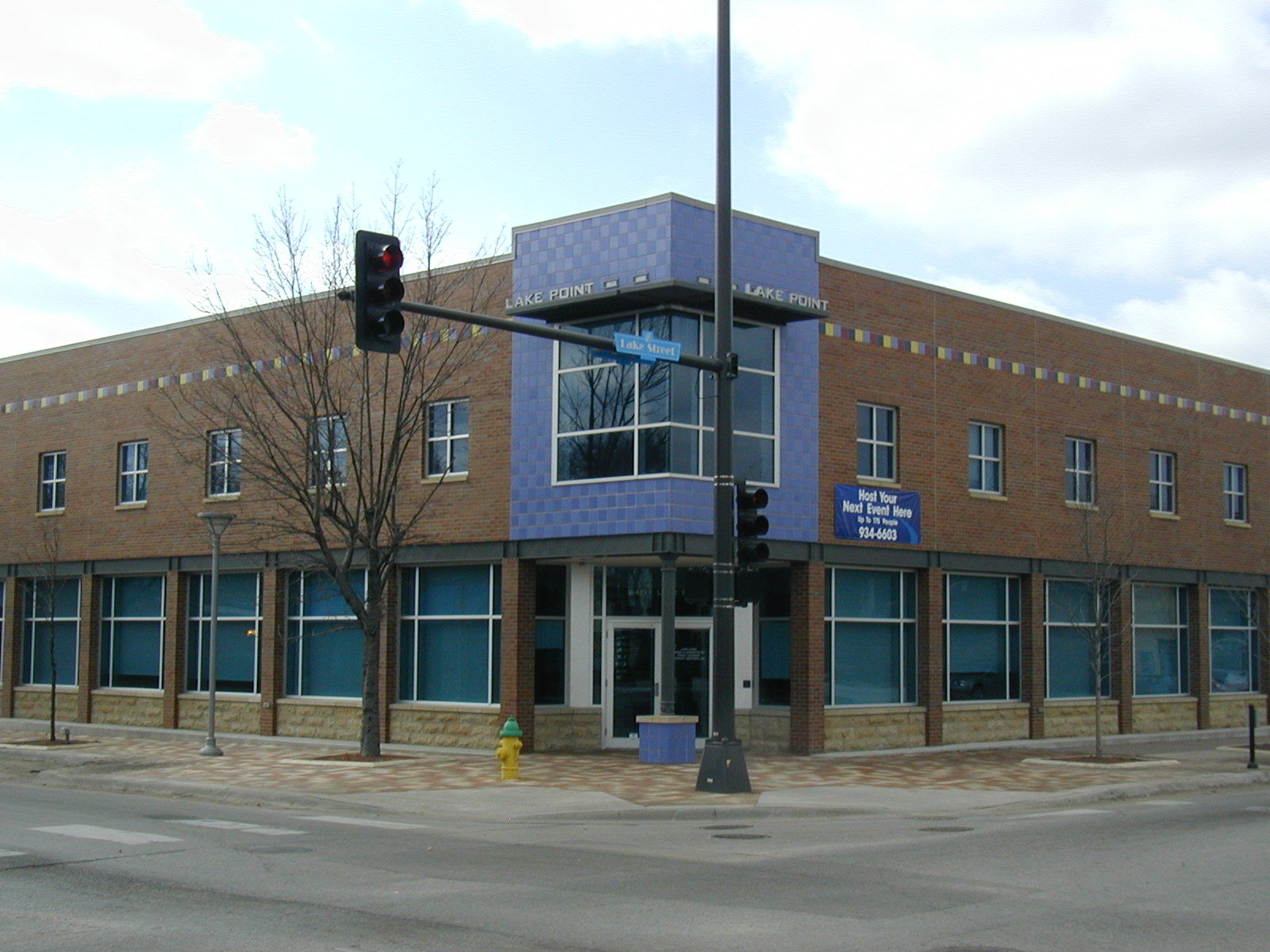
- The southwest corner of 24th and Lake Streets
- Interactive map of 24th and Lake Historic District
- Country: United States
- State: Nebraska
- County: Douglas
- City: Omaha
- Time zone: UTC-6 (CST)
  - Summer (DST): UTC-5 (CDT)
- ZIP Codes: 68111
- Area code: 402

The 24th and Lake Historic District is a neighborhood commercial area in North Omaha, Nebraska. Often referred to as a Black neighborhood, it is one of the oldest commercial areas outside of downtown Omaha and was established in the 1860s. Historically a racially mixed neighborhood, there have been large populations of Jews, Scandinavians, and other European immigrant groups in the area, as well as African Americans. Today, it remains an important center of the city's African-American culture. The area included businesses, professional offices, restaurants, residences, and social locations. Today, there are also museums and cultural facilities as well.

Today, its boundaries are defined by the National Register of Historic Places, "the district encompasses 11 partial city blocks. The main thoroughfare, North 24th Street, extends north and south while Lake Street is perpendicular to North 24th Street in the east and west directions. The district includes North 24th Street from Patrick Avenue on the south to Ohio Street on the north and from 22nd Street on the east to just west of 26th Street.

There were 38 buildings included on the original National Park Service application for the historic district to be listed on the National Register of Historic Places, including the former Love's Jazz and Art Center, the Omaha Star building, and the Webster Telephone Exchange Building and many others.

Other historic sites within or adjacent to the district not included in the original application include the St. John African Methodist Episcopal Church, Lizzie Robinson House, Calvin Memorial Presbyterian Church, Sacred Heart Catholic Church, and Zion Baptist Church.

Both original listings in the application that have been demolished, the historic facades of the former Fair Deal Cafe and the former 26th and Lake Streetcar Barn have been restored as monuments to the past.

== See also ==
- African Americans in Omaha, Nebraska
- Neighborhoods of Omaha, Nebraska
