= Christianity in Omaha, Nebraska =

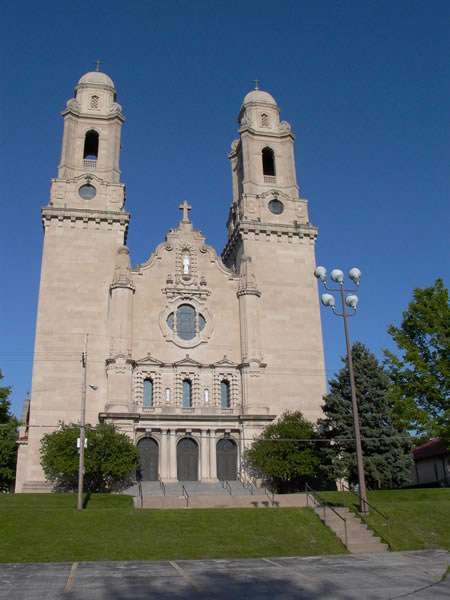
St. Cecilia Cathedral, which took 54 years, from 1905 to 1959, to be completed and consecrated

Christianity in Omaha, Nebraska has been integral to the growth and development of the city since its founding in 1854. In addition to providing Christian religious and social leadership, individually and collectively the city's churches have also led a variety of political campaigns throughout the city's history.

== History ==
The first sermon in Omaha was preached in 1854 by Peter Cooper, an English Methodist who operated a quarry in the city. Almost all of the sixteen attendees lived in neighboring Council Bluffs. Within six months the city had a regular Methodist circuit rider who conducted services at the territorial capitol.

The Omaha Claim Club donated two lots for the congregation to build a church, and soon after Baptists, Presbyterians, Congregationalists, Episcopalians and Roman Catholics followed. Catholics dedicated St. Philomena's Cathedral in 1856, and the entire Creighton family, including Edward, his wife Mary, and his brother John greatly supported the Catholic Church. Pioneer banker Augustus Kountze called for and financially supported the founding of the first Lutheran church west of the Missouri River, which was then called Immanuel Lutheran Church and was located downtown. It was renamed after Kountze's father in the 1880s.

Episcopalians counted a great deal of political leaders in their ranks through the 1900s. St. John's African Methodist Episcopal Church, organized in 1867, was the first church for African Americans in Nebraska.

Edward and Lizzie Robinson founded the first Church of God in Christ congregation in Nebraska in North Omaha in 1916. The distinguished United Methodist Bishop John Louis Nuelsen was assigned to the Omaha Episcopal Area from 1908 through 1912. The Notre Dame Academy and Convent located in the Florence neighborhood was closely affiliated with the Czech community of Omaha from its founding in the 1920s through its closure in the 1970s.

In 1936 a federally funded survey on religion found that Protestants were the largest religious body in the city, with Lutherans the largest denomination. Roman Catholics from throughout Europe had formed churches throughout South Omaha, including Latvian, Polish, German and Czech congregations. In 1953, Hanscom Park United Methodist Church gained national attention when the pastor formed a psychiatric support group for Methodist ministers. St. Cecilia Cathedral, the cathedral church of the Roman Catholic Archdiocese of Omaha, is notable for the Spanish Renaissance Revival style design employed during the 54 years it took to build it in the city's Gold Coast Historic District. A 1966 documentary about a church in Omaha called A Time for Burning was nominated for an Academy Award. The film was an inductee of the 2005 National Film Registry list.

=== Architecture ===
Several churches in Omaha feature notable architecture. Eleven of the city's churches have been designed as Omaha Landmarks or listed on the National Register of Historic Places. Calvin Memorial Presbyterian Church has been noted as, "architecturally significant to Omaha as a fine example of the Neo-Classical Revival Style of architecture." Holy Family Catholic Church is the oldest existing Catholic Church in Omaha. Zion Baptist Church, an early Black church in the city's Near North Side neighborhood, is housed in a building that was designed by noted master architect Clarence W. Wigington.

== Present ==
Churches in Omaha have continued to influence the city in a variety of ways. In the 1960s and 70s Holy Family Catholic Church was regarded as a center of progressive activism. David Rice, of the notorious Rice/Poindexter Case, was a guitar player at the church in the early 1970s. Former United Methodist minister and district superintendent Lowen Kruse as a Nebraska state senator since 2001. In 2007 a group of socially conservative churches protested a proposed speech by author Anne Lamott at the Jesuit Catholic Creighton University. This political pressure caused the university to cancel the popular Presbyterian author's appearance. A coalition of progressive Protestant churches re-invited Lamott to the city and she delivered her talk at the Holland Performing Arts Center instead of Creighton. Lamott was so impressed with this action that she waived all speaking fees. Other churches in the city have been active in Nebraskans for Peace and Habitat for Humanity. Rev. Kenneth Vavrina, the priest of St. Richard's Catholic Church, has been an outspoken advocate to calm racial tension in Omaha.

As with every notable city, there are many former churches in Omaha. They include Pearl Memorial United Methodist Church and Lowe Avenue Presbyterian Church. A 2020 report by the Association of Religion Data Archives found that there were over 195,000 adherents of Protestant denominations and over 192,000 adherents of Catholicism in Omaha.

== See also ==
- Jewish community in Omaha
- List of cemeteries in Omaha
