= Fair Deal Cafe =

Diner in North Omaha, Nebraska

Coordinates: 41°16′44.5″N 95°56′50.2″W

- Interactive map of Fair Deal Cafe

Restaurant information
- Established: 1954
- Food type: Soul food
- Location: 2118 North 24th Street, Omaha, Nebraska, 68111, USA
- Other information: Closed in 2003

Fair Deal Cafe was a historically significant diner for the African American community in North Omaha, Nebraska. Once known as the "Black City Hall", Fair Deal was located at North 24th & Burdette in the Near North Omaha neighborhood from 1954 - 2003.

== History ==
Opened in 1954, the original Fair Deal Cafe is reputed for playing a major role in the history of North Omaha. A variety of politicians and community leaders gathered there throughout the years, and as a social and cultural hub for almost 50 years in the second half of the 20th century there was no parallel in the community.

The cafe was called Omaha's "Black City Hall" because "people from all over came and local people had meetings there to discuss politics and run campaigns running for major offices at the state level as well as the national level." Senators and governors came to the cafe. Leaders including Ernie Chambers, Brenda Council, Ben Gray, Gene Haynes, and others met there to discuss the important issues facing the city. Celebrities including Bill Cosby, Ella Fitzgerald, and Jesse Jackson came there, too.

Famous for serving chitlins and candied sweet potatoes, the Fair Deal Cafe has Art Deco fixtures, including the lunch counter, stools, and ceiling fans, as well as a tin ceiling. The cafe was located near the St. Martin de Porres Center, which was home to the De Porres Club, an anti-racial segregation organization active in Omaha from the 1940s into the 1970s.

In the early 1990s, the cafe was owned by a man named Charlie Hall. It was reputed to be Omaha's only soul food restaurant during that period.

After changing owners, Fair Deal closed in 2003. The cafe building was bought by the Omaha Economic Development Corporation in 2008.

== Redevelopment ==
In Summer 2011, the local Empowerment Network announced a $1.43 billion North Omaha Village Revitalization Plan approved by the City of Omaha. As part of the plan, a redeveloped Fair Deal Cafe will become the showcase of the new "Fair Deal Urban District". The district, which is generally bounded by North 24th, 26th, Blondo and Burdette Streets, will contain several elements. They include a proposed art campus for the Union for Contemporary Arts, and a 40-unit apartment complex for senior citizens and five single family homes at 25th Street near Patrick Avenue. Details of the site of the $12.2 million redevelopment work were announced in September 2012 at a ground-breaking ceremony that drew about 50 city, neighborhood and business leaders.

Officials said that the urban district was the first tangible sign of a larger vision to be carried out over decades and would require billions of dollars in private and public investment.

On December 10, 2015, the building was demolished by Omaha Economic Development Corporation to make room for Fair Deal Marketplace which opened in December 2016. Terri Sanders, with the Omaha Economic Development Corporation, said, “The North Omaha area is considered a food desert. We've not had a grocery store here in over 40 years so there will be a fresh food market, a Fair Deal Village Café restaurant. There will be an outside eating area and there will be room for at least 12 microbusinesses.”

For a brief time, there was a new Fair Deal Cafe that was modernized and opened in 2016. It was owned and operated by Jon Nielle Allen. Part of the Fair Deal Village MarketPlace, the business closed within two years. Afterward another restaurant moved in.

== See also ==
- History of North Omaha, Nebraska
- List of African American historic places in Omaha, Nebraska
