= North 24th Street =

Street in Omaha, Nebraska

- South end: Dodge Street 41°15′35″N 95°56′49″W
- North end: Read Street 41°19′24″N 95°56′49″W

North 24th Street is a two-way street that runs south–north in the North Omaha area of Omaha, Nebraska, United States. With the street beginning at Dodge Street, the historically significant section of the street runs from Cuming Street to Ames Avenue. A portion of North 24th near Lake Street is considered the "Main Street" of the Near North Side, and was historically referred to as "The Street of Dreams." The corridor is widely considered the heart of Omaha's African-American community.

== History ==
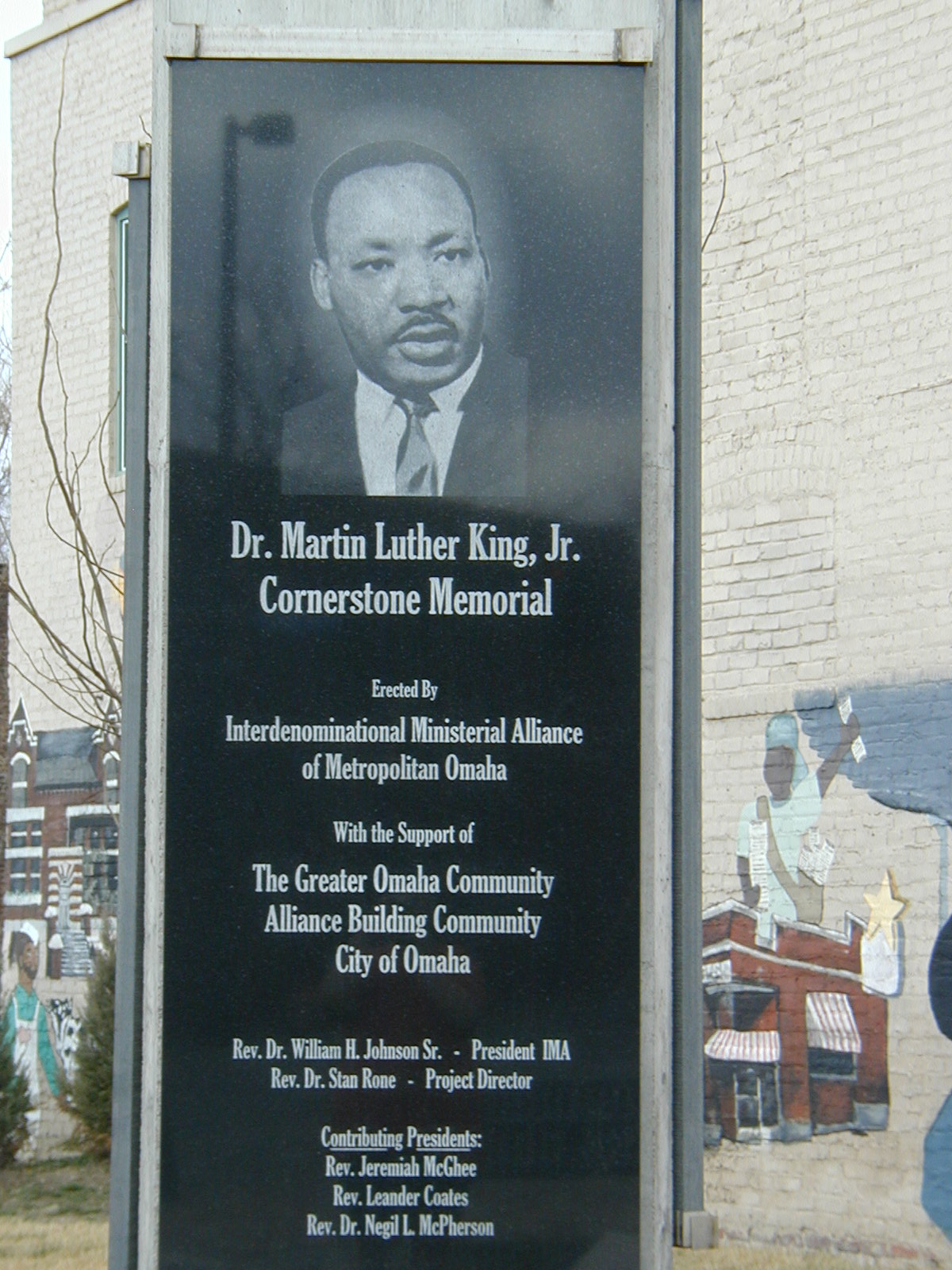
Dr. Martin Luther King Jr. Cornerstone Memorial at the NW corner of 24th & Lake Streets

North 24th Street first became prominent as a center of Jewish life in Omaha in the 1870s and '80s. During that period, Jewish settlers opened a variety of shops along the strip to serve other new immigrants to Omaha. Located immediately north of Downtown Omaha, North 24th Street was the location of dozens of businesses, including bakeries, clothiers, groceries, drug stores, and laundries. There were also a number of synagogues, churches, and mortuaries along the street. In the 1910s, author Tillie Olsen's father worked in a confectionery along North 24th Street. The 1913 Easter Sunday tornado devastated the North 24th Street corridor, causing a great deal of death and destruction along its route.

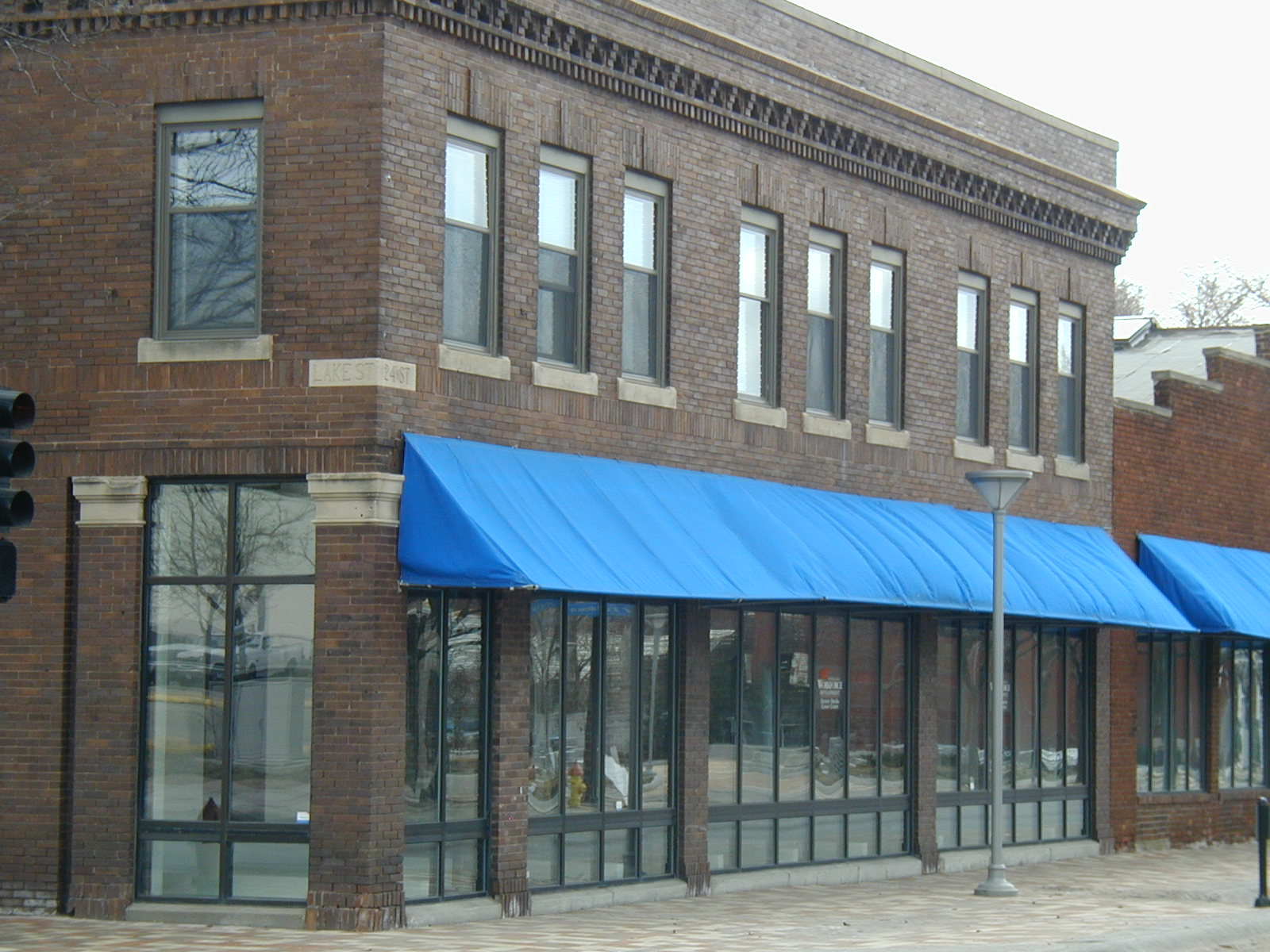
The SE corner of North 24th & Lake Streets

In the aftermath of the lynching of Will Brown in 1919, Omaha's African-American residents increasingly encountered redlining against investment in their neighborhood. In addition, race-restrictive covenants prevented their moving to other areas. Accompanied by earlier white residents moving to other areas as population increased, these economic and social restrictions led to the Near North Side becoming exclusively African American. North 24th Street and the neighborhood surrounding it became the nucleus of Omaha's most significant African-American neighborhood. During the 1920s, a number of African American-owned businesses and cultural establishments developed along the street as population increased and thrived. The Dreamland Ballroom, where events were held marking the beginning of the "black movement" in Omaha, smaller musical establishments, several movie theaters and new churches were all built up along the street. Business and culture along North 24th continued to thrive into the 1950s, as many African Americans made progress in gaining higher skilled industrial jobs and some went on to higher education.

July 4, 1966, marked the first of several riots along North 24th Street. After a 103 degree day, a crowd of African Americans gathered in the evening at the intersection of North 24th and Lake Streets, the heart of the Near North Side. When police demanded their dispersal, the crowd erupted, quickly demolishing police cars and destroying neighboring businesses. The crowd then roamed the North 24th Street business corridor for hours, firebombing vacant buildings and demolishing storefronts up and down the street. Millions of dollars in damage was caused to businesses. The riot continued unabated for three days. Within a month, the street was again aflame. On August 1, riots erupted after a 19-year-old was shot by an off-duty white policeman during a burglary. Three buildings along North 24th Street were firebombed, with more than 180 riot police involved in quelling the crowd.

On June 24, 1969, an African-American teenager named Vivian Strong was shot and killed by police officers in an incident at the Logan Fontenelle Housing Projects, which were located along North 24th. Young African Americans in the area rioted in response to the teenager's death, with looting throughout the entirety of the North 24th Street business corridor. During this initial surge, eight businesses were destroyed by firebombing or looting. Events went on for several more days.

The business district along North 24th Street has not recovered since the riots; however, new investments by the City of Omaha have shown "promising returns" since 2000.

== Neighborhoods ==
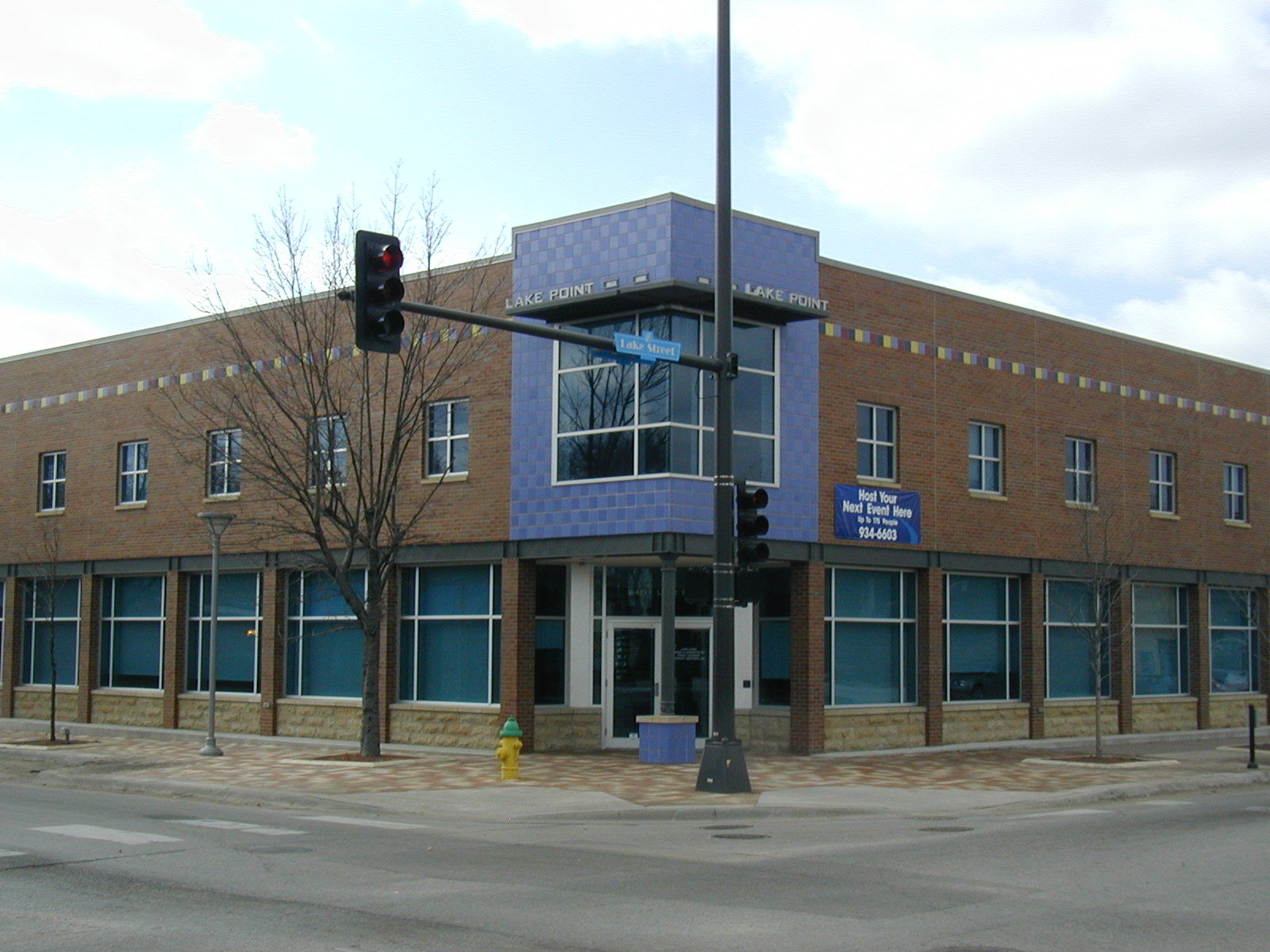
The SW corner of 24th & Lake Streets

North 24th Street begins at Dodge Street in Downtown Omaha. Going from south to north, the street immediately travels underneath I-480 and through the Creighton University campus in the NoDo neighborhood. The Near North Side begins after crossing Cuming Street, with the intersection of North 24th and Lake Streets serving as the heart of North Omaha and the city's African American community. North 24th continues to Binney Street, which is the southern boundary of the Kountze Place neighborhood. The intersection of North 24th and Ames was once an important commercial district, along with the intersection with Fort Street, approximately two miles to the north. The area in between is the historic Saratoga neighborhood. After crossing the Storz Expressway, the street travels through the Miller Park neighborhood and then the Minne Lusa neighborhood, ending at Read Street.

== Revitalization ==
In 2006, the Greater Omaha Chamber of Commerce launched the North Omaha Development Project in order to secure strategic business, cultural, and social investments in North Omaha. Planners seek to create a self-supporting private market and a neighborhood setting rewarding to its citizens and businesses. This is happening particularly in the wake of the recent redevelopment of the neighboring NoDo area of Downtown Omaha. The plan includes the continued expansion of Creighton University and the development of a "dual gateway" at 24th and Cuming, with the southern side of the intersection providing an ornamental entrance to Creighton, and the northern side becoming a "retail village" that opens up to North Omaha. Along North 24th to Parker Street, there could be townhouses and other new housing developed. The area around North 24th and Lake Streets would emphasize arts, entertainment, and culture. The plan takes advantage of Love's Jazz and Art Center and the Dreamland Plaza. A new theater and a financially viable African-American museum near the intersection could enhance it as the cultural center of north Omaha.

The City of Omaha is supporting this effort with the North 24th Street Historic Jazz District Project, focusing on the street between Ohio and Cuming Street. Funded by nearly $2 million in city and federal grants, the total estimated cost of the project is $3.5 million to $4.5 million.

== Notable locations ==
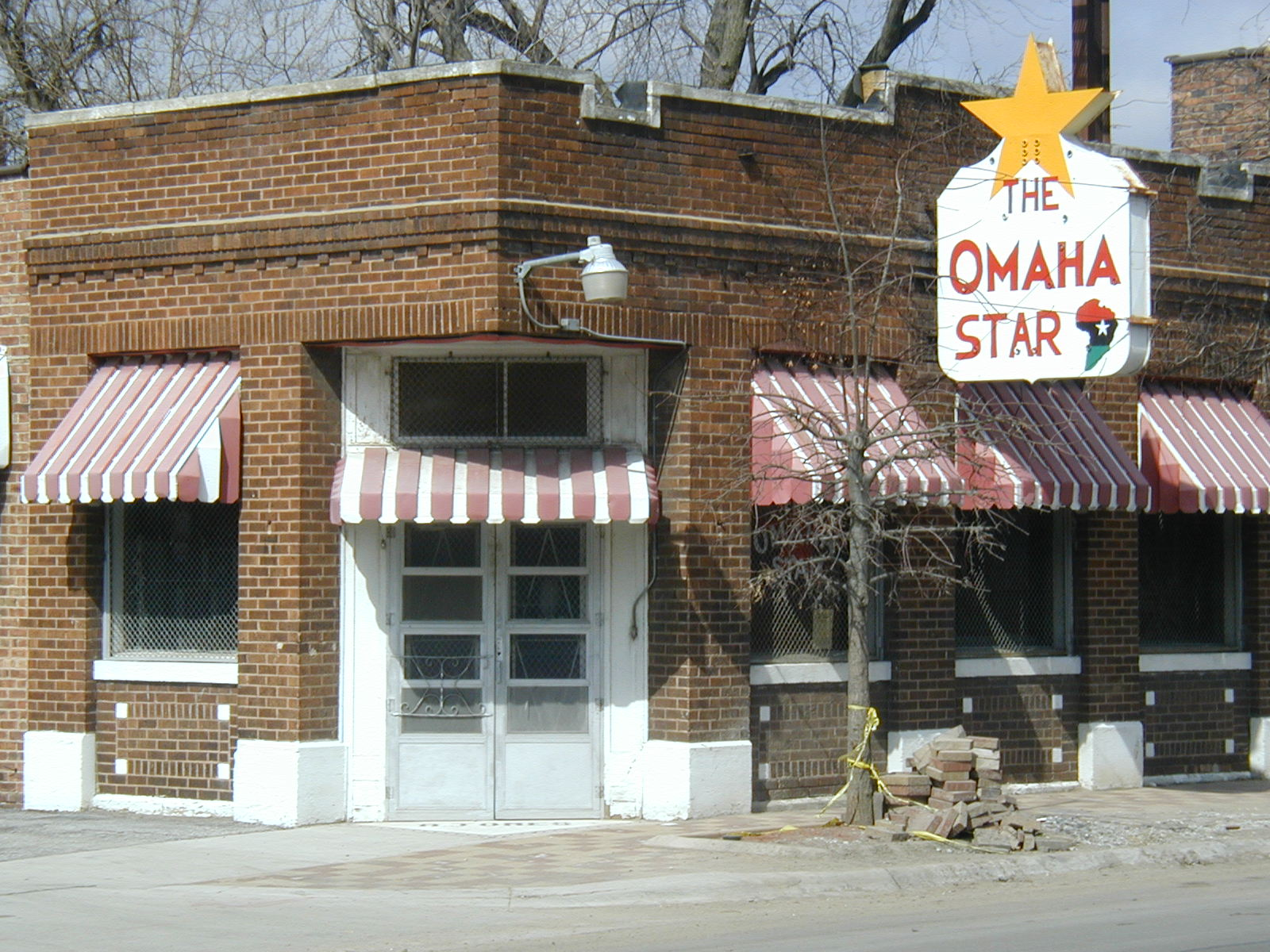
The historic office of the Omaha Star on North 24th

Several important Omaha Landmarks are located along North 24th Street. They include the Calvin Memorial Presbyterian Church, built in 1910 at 3105 North 24th Street; the Jewell Building, built in 1923 at 2221 North 24th Street; and the Redick Mansion, originally built in 1875, which became the first home of Omaha University in 1909. It was located at 3612 North 24th Street. The Paul Street School was built at 1311 North 24th Street in 1892; in 1952, it was replaced with Kellom Elementary School. The Omaha Star building at 2216 North 24th Street was a mortuary and social hall before becoming home to the historic Omaha Star. The notable Druid Hall is located at 2412 Ames Avenue just off North 24th Street. Further north is Pearl Memorial United Methodist Church, located at North 24th and Odgen Avenue, and further still is Miller Park.

The Fair Deal Cafe, once known as Omaha's "Black City Hall", is being revitalized, as is the city's first African American banking institution, Carver Savings and Loan Association. Both sit along North 24th. Love’s Jazz and Art Center, named in honor of North Omaha native Preston Love, is located at 2510 North 24th Street. The Native Omaha Club is located at 3819 North 24th Street. The Dr. Martin Luther King Jr. Cornerstone Memorial, installed in 2006, is located at the intersection of North 24th and Lake Streets. The Dreamland Plaza, installed in 2004, is a tribute to the Dreamland Ballroom and is located at North 24th and Erskine Streets. The bi-annual Native Omaha Days parade has been held along North 24th Street since the mid-1970s.

Notable locations along North 24th Street - alphabetical order
Location	Name	Built	Notes
3105 North 24th Street	Calvin Memorial Presbyterian Church	1910	
2221 North 24th Street	Jewell Building	1923	
3612 North 24th Street	Redick Mansion	1875	Moved from Omaha in 1907, it was the first home of Omaha University.
1311 North 24th Street	Paul Street School	1892	it was replaced with Kellom Elementary School in 1952.
2216 North 24th Street	Omaha Star building	1923	It was a mortuary and social hall before becoming home to the historic Omaha Star.
2319 Ogden Street	Pearl Memorial United Methodist Church	1926	
2412 Ames Avenue	Druid Hall	1915	Home of Nebraska's last Prince Hall Masons chapter.
2118 North 24th Street	Fair Deal Cafe		Once known as Omaha's "Black City Hall"
2416 Lake Street	Carver Savings and Loan Association	1944	The city's first African American banking institution.
2510 North 24th Street	Love’s Jazz and Art Center		Named in honor of North Omaha native Preston Love.
3819 North 24th Street	Native Omaha Club		
North 24th and Lake Street	Dr. Martin Luther King Jr. Cornerstone Memorial	2006	

== See also ==
- History of North Omaha, Nebraska
