= Carver Savings and Loan Association =

First African-American financial institution in Omaha, Nebraska

Coordinates: 41°16′54″N 95°56′52″W

- Company type: Savings and loan association
- Founded: 1944; 82 years ago, in Omaha, Nebraska
- Headquarters: North Omaha, Nebraska, United States
- Products: Financial services

The Carver Savings and Loan Association (Carver S&L) opened in 1944 as the first African-American financial institution in Omaha, Nebraska. Located at 2416 Lake Street next to the historic North 24th Street corridor, it was in the heart of the Near North Omaha neighborhood, and Omaha's African-American business district.

In the 1950s, Whitney Young, then head of Omaha's Urban League, worked with the Carver S&L to create a special lending program for prospective African-American home buyers. It was designed to fight the city's segregationist red lining practices, by which banks restricted loans in neighborhoods they thought to be less successful. Minority and immigrant communities were disproportionately affected by these policies, which made it challenging for their residents to obtain loans. Through the Carter S&L program, Omaha's black families were able to buy more homes within three years than they have previously bought in the last decade by using other banks in the city.

The former building that housed Carter S&L is noted as important to the history of the neighborhood and to Omaha's African-American history. In 2012, the building became the cornerstone of plans for a redevelopment project to create an arts district on the North 24th Street corridor.

The former bank building is being renovated by the Bemis Center for Contemporary Arts, Theaster Gates, and the Rebuild Foundation to be used and operated as an art gallery. Students from Omaha North High School and the University of Nebraska-Omaha have contributed volunteer hours to rehabilitate the area.

== See also ==
- History of North Omaha, Nebraska
- List of African American historic places in Omaha, Nebraska
