= Ernie Chambers =

Member of the Nebraska Legislature (born 1937)

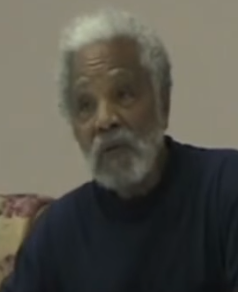

Member of the Nebraska Legislature from the 11th district
- In office January 9, 2013 – January 6, 2021
- Preceded by: Brenda Council
- Succeeded by: Terrell McKinney
- In office January 6, 1971 – January 7, 2009
- Preceded by: George W. Althouse
- Succeeded by: Brenda Council

Personal details
- Born: Ernest William Chambers; July 10, 1937 (age 89) Omaha, Nebraska, U.S.
- Party: Independent
- Other political affiliations: New Alliance (1988)
- Education: Creighton University (BA, JD)

Ernest William Chambers (born July 10, 1937) is an American politician and civil rights activist who represented North Omaha's 11th District in the Nebraska State Legislature from 1971 to 2009 and again from 2013 to 2021. He could not run in 2020 due to term limits.

Chambers is the longest-serving state senator in Nebraska history, having represented North Omaha for 46 years. For most of his career, Chambers was the only nonwhite senator. He is the only African-American to have run for governor and the first to have run for the U.S. Senate in Nebraska history. For years he was the only openly atheist member of any state legislature in the United States.

== Early life ==
Chambers was born in the Near North Side neighborhood of Omaha, Nebraska, to Malcolm Chambers, a local minister, and Lillian Chambers. His father's family originally came from Mississippi and his mother's family originally came from Louisiana. He has six siblings, who were all born in Omaha.

In 1955, Chambers graduated from Omaha Tech High School. In 1959, he graduated from Creighton University with a B.A. in history, with minors in Spanish and philosophy. He attended Creighton University School of Law in the early 1960s and completed his degree in 1979.

He refused to join the Nebraska State Bar Association, so was unable to practice law; in 2015, he explained his refusal on the grounds that he had earned the right to practice by passing law school, and should not have to pay the Bar Association dues as well.

== Career ==
=== Omaha Post Office ===
In 1963, when Chambers was 25, he worked for the Omaha Post Office. He has said he was fired for insubordination because he spoke out against the management at the Post Office calling the black staff "boys". He picketed the Postmaster General's speech in Omaha with a sign that read, "I spoke against discrimination in the Omaha Post Office and was fired."

=== Summer 1966 riots ===
During a series of heat waves in 1966, there were two disturbances in Omaha. In July, the Nebraska National Guard was summoned to restore order after police and black teenagers clashed three nights in a row. In early August, a series of riots occurred over three nights. Chambers worked as a spokesperson for the community during both conflicts, meeting with Mayor A.V. Sorenson and helping to end the riots.

During this period, Chambers emerged as a prominent leader in the North Omaha community, where he successfully negotiated concessions from the city's leaders on behalf of North Omaha's African-American youth. Chambers headed a committee of the Near North Side Police-Community Relations Council, collated information, and presented numerous complaints about the police to city officials. The African-American community had previously been led by more established organizations like Omaha Urban League and the local chapter of the NAACP, not an emerging young anti-establishment leader like Chambers.

Chambers was working as a barber at the time, and appeared in the Oscar-nominated 1966 documentary film A Time for Burning, where he talked about race relations in Omaha.

=== Nebraska Legislature ===
In 1968, Chambers ran for a position on the Omaha School Board, but was not elected. He also failed as a write-in candidate for the Omaha City Council in 1969. In 1970 he was elected to represent North Omaha's 11th District in the Nebraska State Legislature, replacing George W. Althouse, who had been appointed to replace Senator Edward Danner, who had died in office. During the election, a policeman was killed in a deserted house by a bomb. Two Black Panthers, David Rice and Edward Poindexter, were charged in the death. Chambers protested, as he thought the men had been framed by COINTELPRO.

Chambers was reelected to the Legislature in every ensuing election through 2004. On April 25, 2005, Chambers became Nebraska's longest-serving state senator, having served for more than 35 years. He was not allowed to seek reelection in 2008 because of a constitutional amendment Nebraska voters passed in 2000 that limits Nebraska state legislators to two consecutive four-year terms. But the amendment permits senators to seek reelection to their office after sitting out for four years, and Chambers defeated incumbent Brenda Council in 2012 by a "landslide".

Chambers also ran for the United States Senate in 1988 as a New Alliance Party candidate. He petitioned to be included on the 1974 ballot for governor of Nebraska and also ran for governor in 1994, receiving 0.43% of the vote.

==== South African divestment ====
Because of a legislative resolution Chambers introduced in 1980, Nebraska became the first state to divest from South Africa in protest of apartheid. Upon discovering that the University of Nebraska held several hundred gold Krugerrands as an investment, Chambers introduced a nonbinding resolution calling for reinvestment of state pension funds that had been invested directly or indirectly in South Africa. The resolution argued that apartheid was contrary to Nebraska's principles of human rights and legal equality.

Nebraska's divestment caused little immediate change in business practices; David Packard of Hewlett-Packard said, "I'd rather lose business in Nebraska than with South Africa." But other state governments and eventually the federal government followed Nebraska's example, contributing to the end of apartheid. Chambers spearheaded a stronger 1984 law mandating divestment, resulting in Nebraska's public employee pension funds divesting $14.6 million in stocks issued by companies that did business with South Africa. Archbishop Desmond Tutu later visited Lincoln, where he remarked that Nebraska had helped to end apartheid. The state government conspicuously did not invite Chambers to Tutu's speaking event.

==== Marsh v. Chambers ====
Chambers filed a lawsuit in 1980 attempting to end the Legislature's practice of beginning its session with a prayer offered by a state-supported chaplain, arguing that it was unconstitutional under the Establishment Clause of the First Amendment. The district court held that the prayer did not violate the Constitution, but that state support for the chaplain did. The 8th Circuit Court of Appeals held that both practices violated the Constitution, but in Marsh v. Chambers (1983), the Supreme Court held by a 6–3 vote that both practices were constitutional because of the United States' "unique history".

==== 1986 NCAA student athletes as state employees ====
Chambers has promoted recognizing NCAA student athletes as state employees since the 1980s, arguing that they are generating revenue for their universities without any legal benefits for doing so, which encourages illegal payments and gifts. A bill on this issue was passed by the Legislature but was unable to overcome the governor's veto. After it was revealed that requiring student athletes to be recognized as state employees would jeopardize any university's NCAA standing, the language of the bill was changed so that a university could allow for players to be paid a stipend, after which the bill passed and was signed by the governor in 2003.

==== 1989 Franklin scandal ====
According to The New York Times, unidentified people present at a closed meeting reported that Chambers claimed he heard credible reports of "boys and girls, some of them from foster homes, who had been transported around the country by airplane to provide sexual favors, for which they were rewarded."

Investigating what became known as the Franklin child prostitution ring allegations, a Nebraska grand jury was convened to investigate the allegations and possibly return indictments. Eventually, the grand jury ruled the entire matter was "a carefully crafted hoax," although they failed to identify the perpetrators of the hoax.

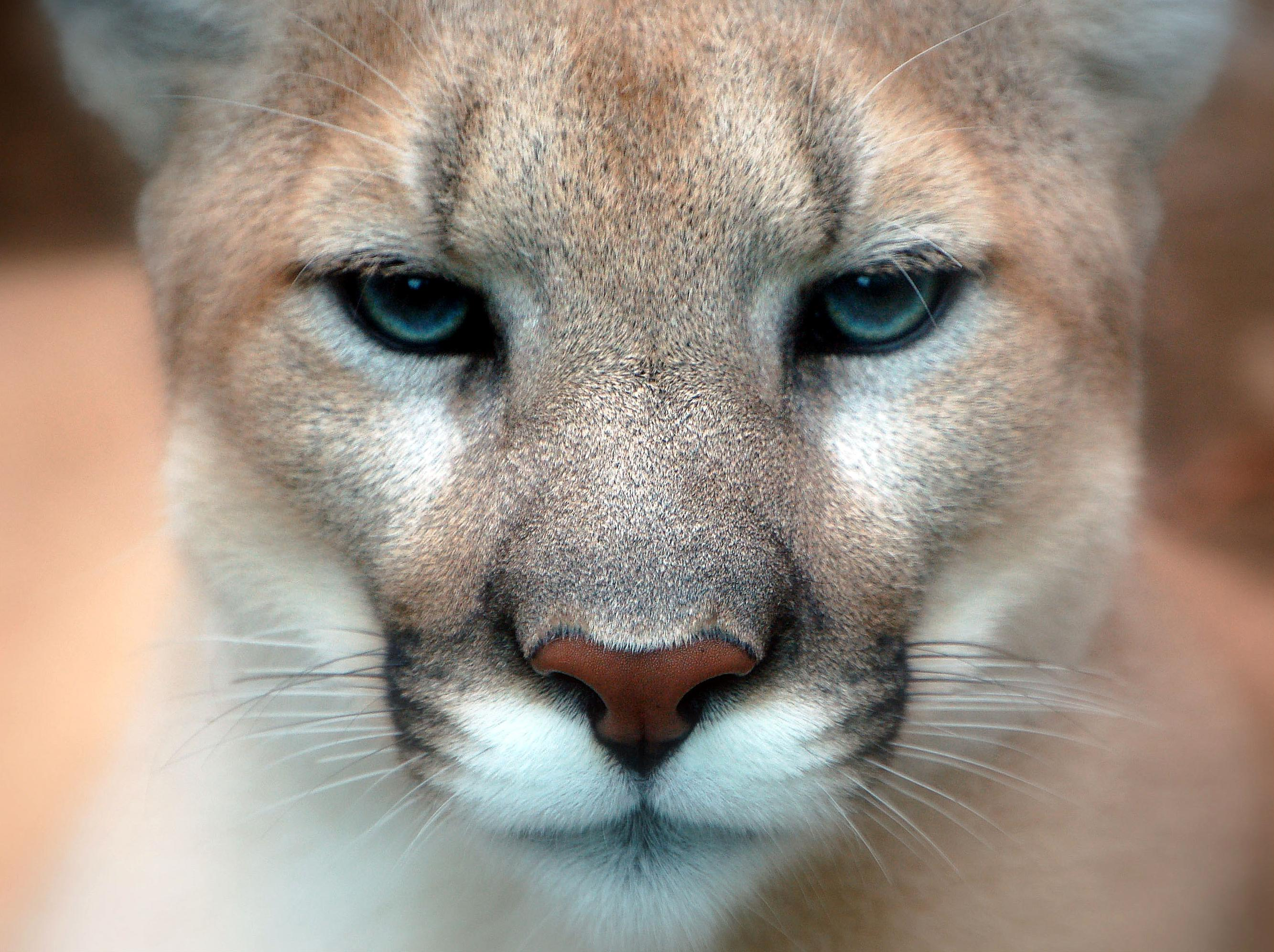
Chambers repeatedly sought to outlaw hunting mountain lions, saying "these animals should not be killed for the love of killing."

==== 1993 LGBT anti-discrimination bill ====
Nebraska's LGBT community has considered Chambers an ally since the 1970s. In 1993, he co-sponsored a bill to prohibit employment discrimination by sexual orientation. The bill faced fierce opposition. Opponents of the anti-discrimination legislation formed a Nebraska chapter of the Traditional Values Coalition and brought activist Lou Sheldon to Lincoln to organize antigay rallies outside the Capitol building.

Despite the opposition, Chambers sponsored another LGBT anti-discrimination bill in 1995. He continued to support similar measures throughout his career in the legislature. None of them have been successful.

==== 2006 Omaha Public Schools controversy ====
In April 2006, Chambers introduced legislative bill (LB) 1024, an amendment to a bill that would divide the Omaha Public Schools district into three different districts. The bill and its amendment were created in response to an effort by the district to "absorb a string of largely white schools that were within the Omaha city limits but were controlled by suburban or independent districts." Omaha Schools claimed that the usurpation was necessary to avoid financial and racial inequity, but supporters of LB 1024 contested the district's expansion, favoring more localized control. The bill received national attention and some critics called it "state-sponsored segregation".

LB 641, passed in 2007, repealed and superseded LB 1024, restoring pre-2006 Omaha-area school district boundaries, after which a "learning community" was created to equalize student achievement in Douglas and Sarpy counties.

==== 2007 lawsuit against God ====
Some members of the Nebraska legislature attempted to ban frivolous lawsuits from Nebraska's court system in 2007. Chambers believed that this attempt was misguided, and that access to the court system should not be restricted. To dramatize his point that the court system must be entirely open, Chambers filed a lawsuit against God in Douglas County district court in September 2007. It argued that God has caused "widespread death, destruction, and terrorization of millions upon millions of the Earth's inhabitants."

Nebraska media inaccurately reported that Chambers's lawsuit against God was intended as an ironic protest against frivolous lawsuits. Chambers clarified that, on the contrary, his lawsuit against God "emphasized that attempts by the Legislature to prohibit the filing of any lawsuit would run afoul of the Nebraska Constitution's guarantee that the doors to the courthouse must be open to everyone."

The Westboro Baptist Church filed an amicus brief in the lawsuit arguing that Chambers did not have standing to sue, and that he was "fully deserving of the outpourings of God's fierce wrath." In response, Chambers voiced disagreement with the church but argued that the church's access to the court system must be protected, just like his.

The lawsuit was dismissed in October 2008 because a summons notifying God of the lawsuit could not be delivered to the defendant, who has no listed address. Chambers countered that, because of God's omniscience, God had been notified, but decided not to pursue the suit further.

==== Capital punishment ====
Chambers is a firm opponent of the death penalty, and introduced a bill to repeal Nebraska's capital punishment law at the start of each legislative session, 36 times over 40 years. The bill, LB268, passed the legislature in 1979 but could not overcome Governor Charles Thone's veto; the issue remained a primary focus of his while in office.

In 2015, Chambers again introduced LB268. The measure passed the legislature over Governor Pete Ricketts's veto. Following the veto, a petition drive was undertaken to reject the bill and maintain capital punishment. Enough signatures were secured to suspend LB268 until the November 2016 general election; in the election, 60% of the votes cast favored rejecting the repeal and keeping the death penalty.

==== 2024 campaign ====
Chambers ran for his old seat in 2024 against Terrell McKinney, and advanced to the runoff. In July 2024, Chambers withdrew his candidacy, stating that his electoral career was over. McKinney won the seat by default.

==== Assorted legislation ====
- Chambers has long advocated on behalf of David Rice and Ed Poindexter, who were convicted of the murder of an Omaha police officer; Amnesty International considers them political prisoners.
- Often clashing with fellow senators, Chambers has taken on several issues of concern to rural Nebraskans during his tenure, such as a bill requiring landowners to manage the population of black-tailed prairie dogs on their property and a proposed constitutional amendment to preserve the right to fish, trap and hunt in the state. Chambers described the latter measure as one of the most "asinine, simple-minded pieces of trash" ever considered by the legislature. In 2004 Chambers co-authored an opinion piece with U.S. Representative Tom Osborne opposing a set of initiatives that would allow casino gambling and slot machines in Nebraska. Chambers also opposed proposed funding of the state's ethanol plant incentive programs, calling them "a boondoggle".
- Chambers has long supported feminist goals. For example, he argued forcefully in favor of a law against sexually assaulting one's spouse in 1975 that made Nebraska the first US state to outlaw marital assault.
- In 2006, Chambers withdrew support from two tax incentive bills that would have provided funding for Omaha and Lincoln civic building projects. He said he withdrew support because Omaha business leaders had insulted the legislature and the North Omaha community he represents by criticizing the passage of LB 1024. He was also insulted by the Omaha City Council's refusal to name a North Omaha park after him despite that neighborhood's request to do so.
- In 2015, Chambers introduced LB473, opposing the Keystone XL pipeline.
- In 2016, Chambers filibustered a bill that would have changed Nebraska's congressional district method of electoral college vote splitting into a winner-take-all system like that of other US states. Because the vote-splitting method was preserved, one district in Nebraska assigned an electoral college vote to Joe Biden in the 2020 presidential election.

== Outreach activities ==
- On November 4, 2008, Chambers was elected to the new Douglas and Sarpy Counties' Learning Community Board; he was sworn in during 2009.
- Chambers hosted a weekly call-in public-access television cable TV show on Omaha's Community Telecast, Inc. (CTI22), broadcast on Cox Channel 22.
- In 2014, after ending his regular Omaha Star column, Chambers said he was going to write a blog.
- Chambers distributes "Erniegrams" to other legislators that consist of typed poems and commentary about recent events and legislative topics in the current session, as well as photocopied articles and political cartoons of note, which are sometimes posted by other legislators on Twitter as Chambers does not use computers.

== Controversy ==
=== Term limit law ===
In 2000, a term-limit amendment was passed that essentially forced Chambers—and half of Nebraska's state senators—out of office in 2008. The amendment required legislators sit out one term, after which they could run for election. In 2012, Chambers was once again elected to represent north Omaha's 11th district in the Nebraska Unicameral, defeating Brenda Council by 3,408 votes, with 10,336 votes cast. He was forced to sit out the 2020 election due to the same law.

=== "My ISIS is the police" ===
On March 20, 2015, during a Judiciary Committee hearing on allowing guns in bars (LB 635), Chambers said, "My ISIS is the police." He said his comments were intended to criticize the failure to prosecute Alvin Lugod, the Omaha police officer who fatally shot Danny Elrod on February 23. Although fellow senators did not react to his comments during the hearing, there was backlash. Omaha Police Chief Todd Schmaderer responded, "The comments that Senator Ernie Chambers made today at the Nebraska Unicameral are not only reprehensible but are completely without merit." Omaha Mayor Jean Stothert also criticized Chambers, saying in a press release that he should be looking for ways to improve public safety instead of "comparing police officers to terrorists."

Governor Pete Ricketts called Chambers's comments "irresponsible" and asked for an apology. Stothert, Police Chief Todd Schmaderer, and Nebraska Attorney General Doug Peterson were also critical, and the hashtag #supportblue was organized in response to Chambers's comments. Senator David Schnoor of Scribner called for his resignation.

Senator Bob Krist of Omaha said he regretted that he had not immediately protested the remark. Several other senators disagreed with Chambers's opinion but defended his right to express it. Senator Dave Bloomfield of Hoskins remarked, "It's a wonderful opportunity to pile onto Senator Chambers." Chambers said he would continue to be vocal in his criticism of the police and would not apologize.

=== Residency challenge ===
On November 8, 2016, Chambers was reelected to the legislature, defeating his opponent, John Sciara, by a vote of 7,763 to 1,726. In January 2017, Sciara filled a protest challenge to the legislature, claiming Chambers did not live in the district he was elected to represent and was thus ineligible to hold office. Chambers denied the allegation, calling it "busybody, gossipy, vengeful cud that already has been chewed." On April 20, 2017, Nebraska state senators voted 42-0 to dismiss Sciara's challenge, following the recommendation of a special legislative committee formed to evaluate the claim.

== Legacy ==
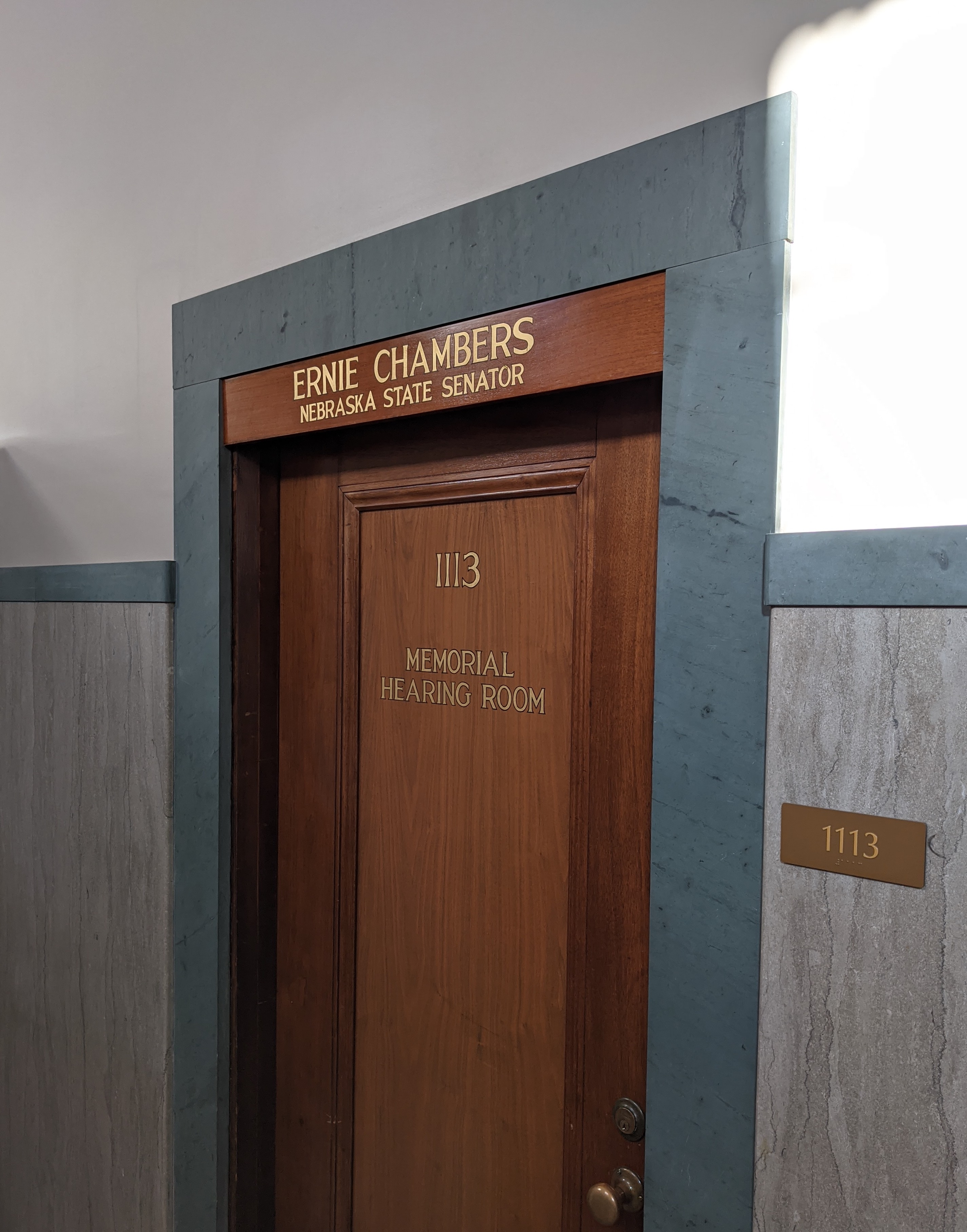
The Ernie Chambers Memorial Hearing Room in the Nebraska Capitol

Chambers is a longtime civil rights activist and the most prominent and outspoken African-American leader in the state. He has been called "the Maverick of Omaha" and the "angriest black man in Nebraska", and has called himself a "Defender of the Downtrodden".

In the 1990s, the apartment complex Strehlow Terrace was renamed Ernie Chambers Court. In 2008, a room at the Nebraska Capitol used for Judiciary Committee meetings was named the Ernie Chambers Memorial Hearing Room.

=== Awards ===
The Freedom from Religion Foundation awarded Chambers a plaque naming him a "Hero of the First Amendment" at their annual convention in 2005 in Orlando.

Chambers was offered a Distinguished Service award from the American Humanist Association in 2007, but he turned it down. He accepted a Lifetime Achievement Award from the association in 2016 at its 75th anniversary conference in Chicago.

== Personal life ==
Aside from serving in the United States Army, Chambers has lived in Nebraska all his life. He is known for his casual attire of blue jeans and short-sleeved sweatshirts, even when in session at the Nebraska Legislature. He often brings his dog with him to work. Chambers is a sketch artist, a therapeutic activity he adopted during long legislative sessions.

Chambers was married to Jacklyn Adele (née Lee) Chambers (January 31, 1940 – July 15, 2000), with whom he had four children before they divorced.

=== Atheism ===
Chambers is an atheist. He views Christianity as a tool of oppression that white people use against Black Americans. For example, in 1965 he called the shooting of fellow Omaha native Malcolm X a "brutal, American-Christian style assassination." Chambers is very familiar with and quotes frequently from the Bible, which he jokingly calls "the Bibble".

For years Chambers was the only openly atheist member of any state government in the nation. A 2015 State Legislatures Magazine survey confirmed that he was the only atheist in a state legislature. He was still the only one in the nation in 2017 according to Kurt Andersen in The Atlantic. In 2019 another atheist, Megan Hunt, joined Chambers in the Nebraska legislature.

Despite not being religious, in January 2009 Chambers obtained credentials as a non-denominational minister so he could officiate at weddings.

== See also ==
- African Americans in Omaha, Nebraska
- Civil rights movement in Omaha, Nebraska
- List of riots and civil unrest in Omaha, Nebraska
- History of North Omaha, Nebraska
- Timeline of racial tension in Omaha, Nebraska
- Timeline of North Omaha, Nebraska history
- History of Omaha, Nebraska
- List of atheists in politics and law
- List of African-American United States Senate candidates
