= Sacred Heart Catholic Church (Omaha, Nebraska) =

Historic church in Nebraska, United States

- Sacred Heart Catholic Church Complex
- U.S. National Register of Historic Places
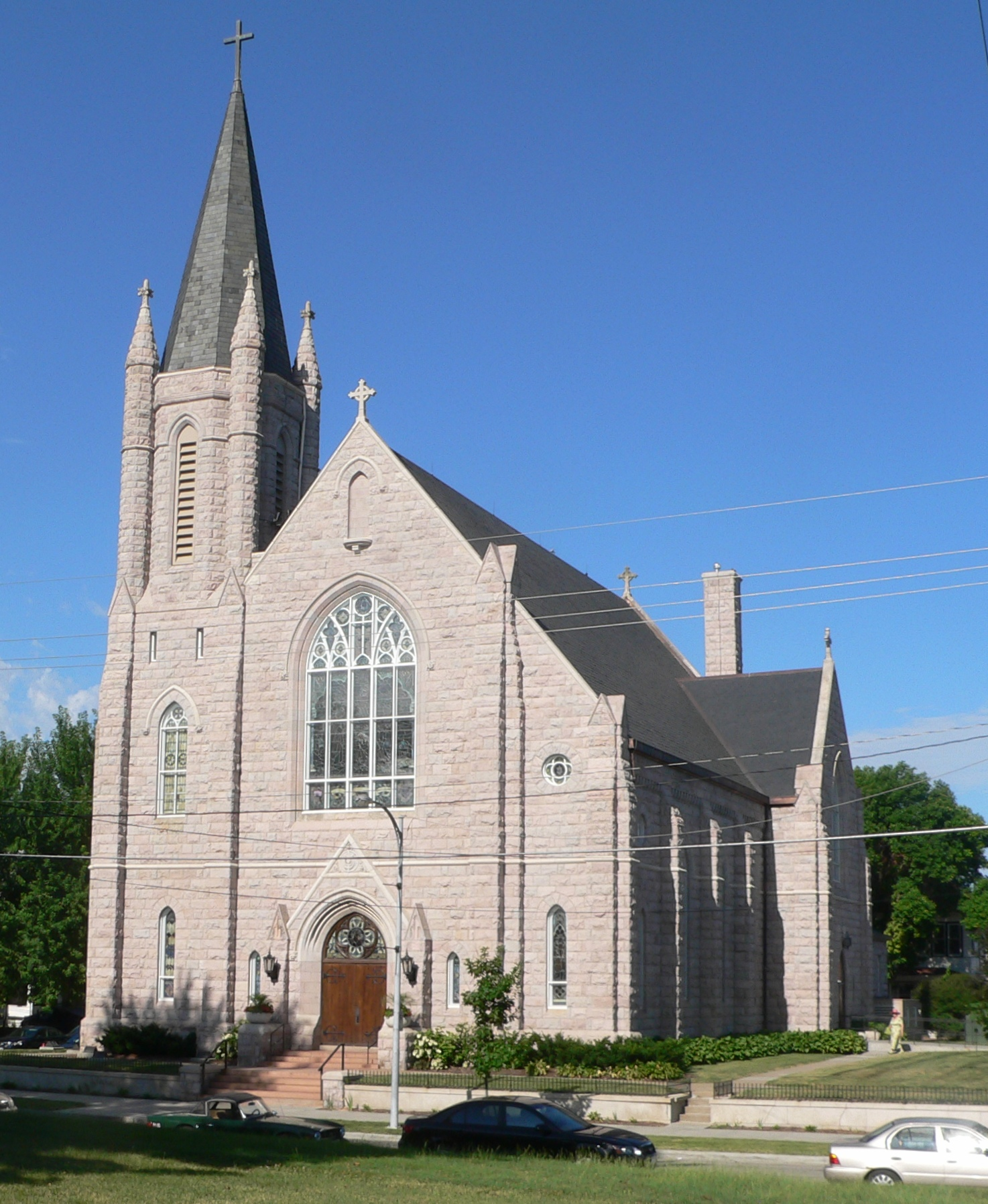
- Church seen from northeast

- Location within Nebraska Location within the United States
- Location: 2218 Binney Street, Omaha, Nebraska
- Coordinates: 41°17′10.5″N 95°56′44.5″W
- Built: 1900
- Architect: Fisher & Lawrie
- Architectural style: Gothic revival
- NRHP reference No.: 83001093
- Added to NRHP: March 24, 1983

Sacred Heart Catholic Church is a historic Catholic parish church located at 2206 Binney Street in the Kountze Place neighborhood of North Omaha, Nebraska within the Archdiocese of Omaha.

== Description ==
Built in 1902 in Late Gothic Revival style, the City of Omaha declared it a landmark in 1979, and it was listed on the National Register of Historic Places in 1983.

Located in a historically African-American neighborhood today, the church was originally constructed on land donated by Omaha real estate investor and banker Herman Kountze for his housing addition called Kountze Place. A high-end streetcar suburb, Kountze Place was an all-white enclave for more than 50 years. White flight in the neighborhood began in 1936 with the imposition of Home Owners' Loan Corporation funds diverting money from a neighboring African American neighborhood called the Omaha. This mass exodus of parishioners from the surrounding neighborhood left Sacred Heart in a lurch, and the church became an open parish for members across the city. Today, the parish and its elementary school for neighborhood students continue thriving, along with a community outreach program and more.

The building continues serving the parish and has been recognized as an official Omaha Landmark.

== See also ==
- Architecture in North Omaha, Nebraska
- Roman Catholic Archdiocese of Omaha
- List of churches in Omaha, Nebraska
