= George W. Althouse =

American politician

Senator George W. Althouse

Member of the Nebraska Legislature from the 11th district
- In office January 1, 1970 – January 6, 1971
- Preceded by: Edward Danner
- Succeeded by: Ernie Chambers

Personal details
- Born: George Walker Althouse; August 6, 1895 Roanoke, Missouri, U.S.
- Died: November 22, 1981 (aged 86)
- Party: Republican
- Spouse(s): Christine, Mildred
- Children: Patricia
- Parents: Moses Walker Althouse (father); Minnie Lee (mother)
- Occupation: Porter for Pullman Co. and co-owner of Althouse School of Beauty
- Profession: Politician and Activist

Military service
- Allegiance: United States of America, World War I
- Years of service: 26 Oct 1917-26 Mar 1919
- Rank: 1st Sergeant
- Unit: Co A, 317th Ammunition Train

George W. Althouse (August 6, 1895 – November 21, 1981) was a Nebraska state senator representing North Omaha in the Nebraska Legislature. He was born in Roanoke, Missouri.

Althouse, a Republican, was appointed to fill the vacancy in the Nebraska Senate in 1970 following the death of African American Senator Edward Danner. He sought re-election in 1970 but was defeated by Sen. Ernie Chambers.

In addition to being a senator, Althouse was active in the Nebraska GOP. In 1964, as a member of the Republican State Central Committee, he was sent as a delegate to the national GOP convention. In 1966, he served on the executive committee of the Douglas County Republican Party. From 1963 to 1966, he served on the Omaha Human Relations Board. He was appointed to the housing committee of the White House Conference on Aging. He was also a member of the US Civil Rights Commission for Nebraska and the Nebraska Equal Opportunity Commission.

In 1981, Althouse and his wife, Mildred, were presented awards for their political activities and work in Omaha's African American communities by the Nebraska Black Republican Council.
