= Lowe Avenue Presbyterian Church Omaha =

Church in Nebraska, United States

Coordinates: 41°16′11″N 95°58′21″W

Lowe Avenue Presbyterian Church was a church in the Omaha, Nebraska.

Founded in 1887, the church was built in 1906 at 1023 N 40th Street in the Walnut Hill neighborhood. Situated on the Southeast corner of 40th and Nicholas Streets, the church was organized on July 3, 1887, by a meeting of the people living near West Hamilton Street. Initiative for the meeting had been taken by a committee appointed for the purpose by the Presbytery of Omaha. Originally, the Church was called the West Hamilton Street Presbyterian Church. Rev. W. J. Palm was the first pastor.

The Church held its final worship service on July 5, 2009, after more than 100 years of service to the Omaha Community.

== See also ==
- Calvin Memorial Presbyterian Church
- Omaha Presbyterian Theological Seminary

== Sources ==
- Description of archives and records
- https://web.archive.org/web/20110719082951/http://www.mlp.org/article.php?story=20090705055153453
