= Near North Side, Omaha =

Neighborhood of Omaha, Nebraska

Coordinates: 41°16′37″N 95°56′30″W

The Near North Side of Omaha, Nebraska is the neighborhood immediately north of downtown. It forms the nucleus of the city's historic African-American community, and its name is often synonymous with the entire North Omaha area. Originally established immediately after Omaha was founded in 1854, the Near North Side was once confined to the area around Dodge Street and North 7th Street. Eventually, it gravitated west and north, and today it is bordered by Cuming Street on the south, 30th on the west, 16th on the east, and Locust Street to the north. Countless momentous events in Omaha's African American community happened in the Near North Side, including the 1865 establishment of the first Black church in Omaha, St. John's AME; the 1892 election of the first African American state legislator, Dr. Matthew Ricketts; the 1897 hiring of the first Black teacher in Omaha, Ms. Lucy Gamble, the 1910 Jack Johnson riots, the Omaha race riot of 1919 that almost demolished the neighborhood and many other events.

The vernacular term "North North Side" fell out of favor in Omaha in the 1970s when the Urban League of Nebraska insisted the media and politicians stop using it, as it was a synonym for white misconceptions of Black people in Omaha. Today, it is not used within the city anymore. Instead, several smaller areas within the old boundaries are identified as neighborhoods including the Long School neighborhood, the Concord Square neighborhood and the Conestoga Place neighborhood. The 24th and Lake Historic District and the Nicholas Street Historic District are both within the former boundaries of the Near North Side, as well.

== History ==
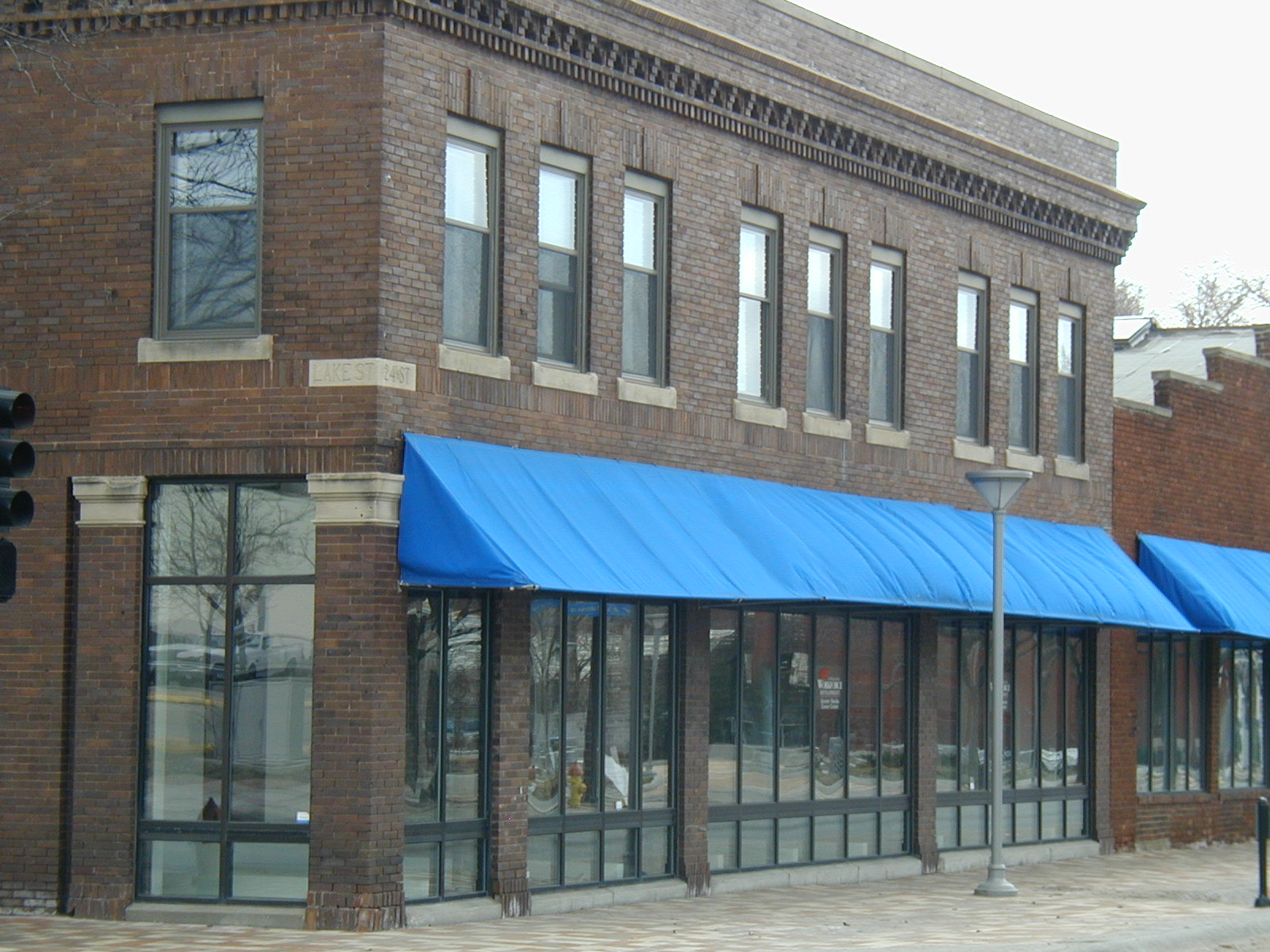
View of the SE corner of 24th & Lake Streets in North Omaha at the heart of the Near North Side.

Bordered by several historic neighborhoods, including Bemis Park, East Omaha, Kountze Park and Saratoga, the Near North Side is perhaps the oldest, and most significant, of each of these. The community was originally platted in 1855 as Scriptown and lots were awarded to Nebraska Territory legislators who voted for Nebraska statehood. Consequently, the area was developed quickly, and included a number of prominent homes.

=== Ethnic history ===
The area grew throughout the last half of the 1800s as Omaha's suburb, with the first streetcars running up and down its main thoroughfares of 24th and 30th Streets. After the Trans-Mississippi Exposition occurred just north of the area in 1898, Kountze Park was developed to serve the area's widely varied racial and ethnic populations. Omaha's Jewish community was founded by eastern European immigrants in the Near North Side neighborhood. Two Jewish synagogues provided social and cultural activities. Other families were secular and Socialist, as were renowned author Tillie Olsen's parents. Olsen worked in the meatpacking plant as a young woman and became a labor organizer in the 1930s before being able to write full-time. Holy Family Catholic Church served successive congregations of German, Irish, Italian and Czech immigrants in the area. There was such a substantial community of Swedes in the area that a portion of the neighborhood was called "Little Stockholm."

The bustling 24th Street corridor also served these communities, with mixed European immigrant communities mingling with the African American community. Many African Americans moved to Omaha from 1910 to 1950 as part of the Great Migration. St. John's African Methodist Episcopal Church and Calvin Memorial Presbyterian Church were among the churches founded to serve the black community.

=== 1913 Tornado ===
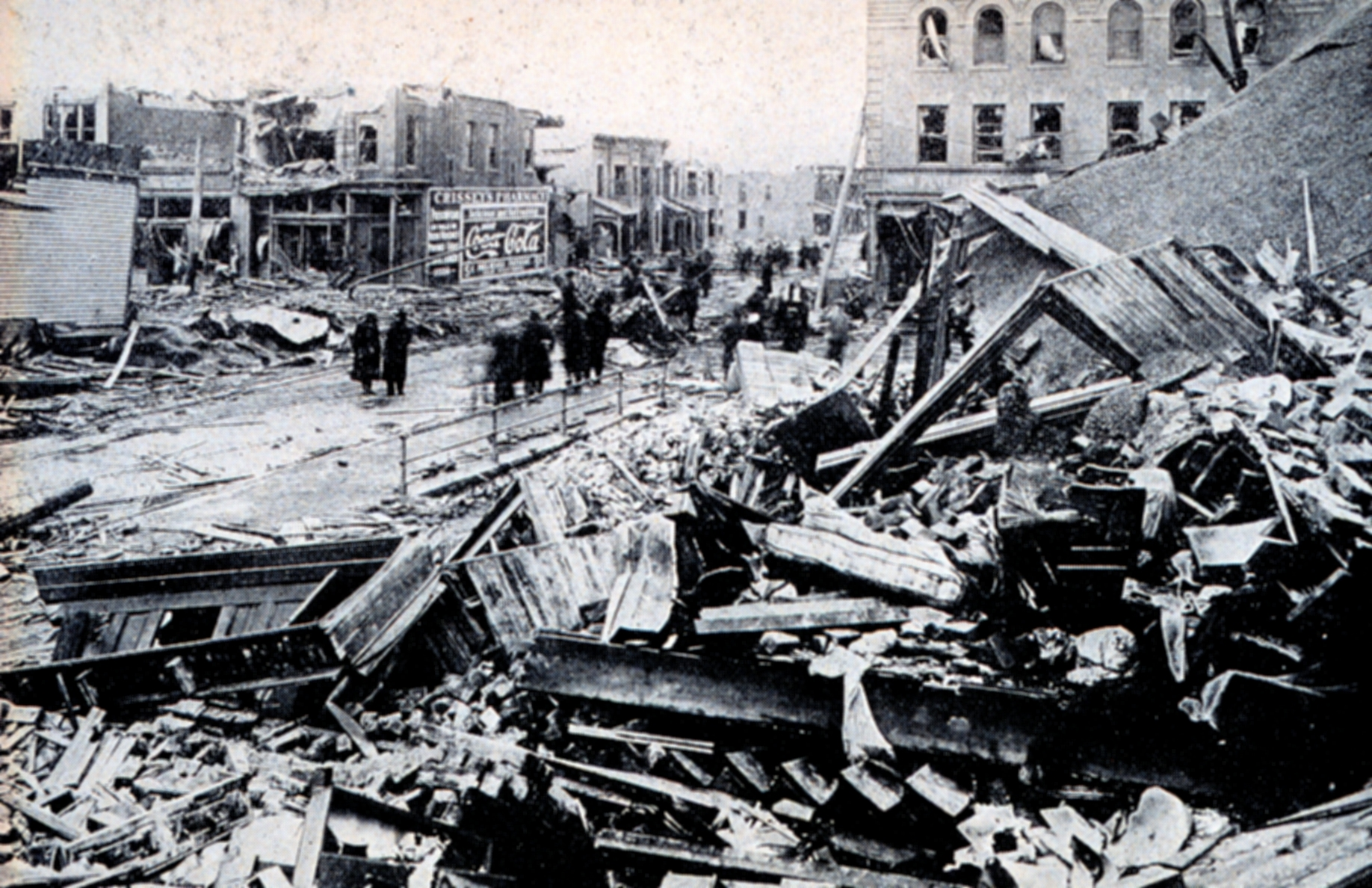
View of the east side of the 24th & Lake Streets in North Omaha after the 1913 tornado. More than 50 people died at this intersection.

The Easter Sunday tornado of 1913 destroyed much of the Near North Side's businesses and neighborhoods. The Idlewild Pool Hall at 2307 North 24th Street in the heart of the neighborhood was the scene of the greatest loss of life. The owner, C. W. Dillard, and 13 customers were killed as they tried to take shelter on the south side of the pool hall's basement. The victims were crushed by falling debris or overcome by smoke from fires begun when wood stoves used for heating overturned. The postcard image shows the slow process of removing the debris to recover the bodies. The victims were then removed to the Webster Telephone Exchange Building at 2213 Lake Street. More than 50 people died at one intersection during the storm. One report identified this building as a central headquarters in recovering the community, as the many operators went to work despite the building missing all of its windows.

=== Red Summer ===
In September 1919, after Red Summer, a mob of white ethnics, chiefly immigrants and immigrant descendants from South Omaha, lynched an African-American worker named Will Brown. The riot followed weeks of increasing tensions inflamed by local newspapers and vice boss Tom Dennsion. Brown's body was burned after his death. After the mob was done with Brown, they attacked police cars and blacks on the street. They were prevented from invading the Near North Side by soldiers called in from Fort Omaha. In addition, the military commander stationed troops in South Omaha to prevent any more mobs from forming.

=== Education ===
Throughout its history, students attended a variety of area schools, including Omaha High and Tech High, both just outside the community's boundaries.

== Housing issues ==
After the riot, landlords and developers began using race-restrictive covenants. Properties for rent and sale were restricted on the basis of race, with the primary intent of keeping North Omaha "black" and the rest of the city "white". These agreements were held in place with redlining, a system of segregated insuring and lending reinforced by the federal government. These restrictions were ruled illegal in 1940.

During the Depression, the federal government built the Logan Fontenelle Housing Projects in Near North Omaha to improve housing for working families. In 1938 it was a significant improvement over where most had been living, as was a counterpart project in South Omaha. The first residents were Eastern European immigrant families.

Hose Company #12, and later Hose Company #11, hired the first African-American firefighters to serve the Near North Side. One of the two stations was located at 20th and Lake Streets.

=== Golden years ===
During the height of the Jazz Age, the Dreamland Ballroom was the highlight of what is widely regarded as Near North Omaha's golden years. It was the largest venue for performances by local and national musicians. From the 1920s through the early 1960s, the neighborhood's cultural scene was vibrant. When the Dreamland Ballroom closed in the 1960s, it was an indication of changing tastes in music and the influence of television, but also of decline.

Wallace Thurman, widely considered one of the great writers of the Harlem Renaissance, grew up in the Near North Side, along with jazz saxophonist Preston Love, political leader George Wells Parker and military hero Alfonza W. Davis. Malcolm X's father Earl Little was a pastor in Near North Omaha when Malcolm was born there in 1926, but the family moved away when he was small.

=== Decline ===
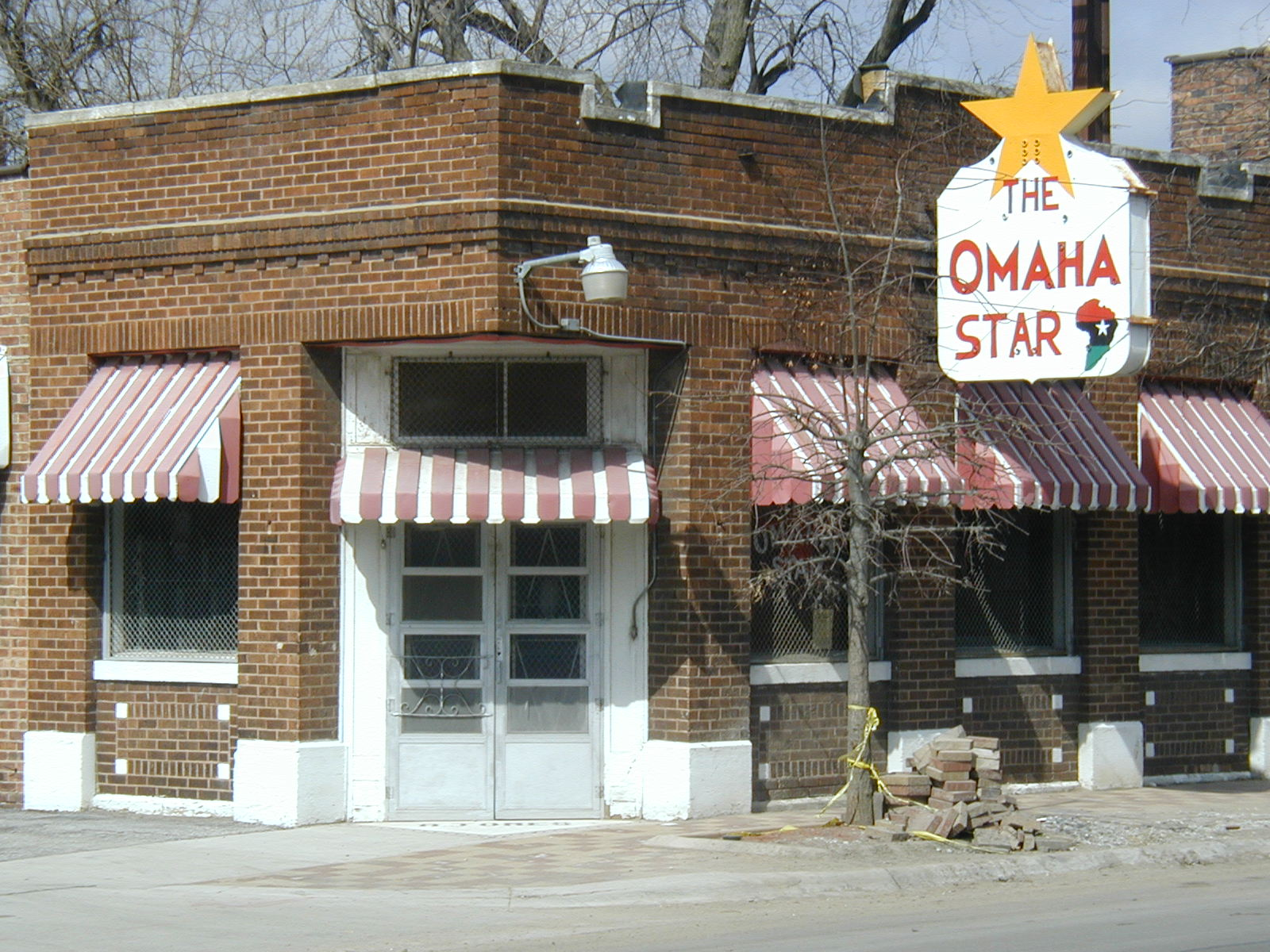
The historic office of the Omaha Star.

The mid-century loss of 10,000 industrial jobs from restructuring of railroads and the meat processing industry meant increasing poverty among people who stayed. The demographics of the housing projects changed along with conditions in the city. By the late 1960s, the Logan Fontenelle Projects were inhabited almost entirely by poor and low-income African Americans. By the early 2000s both of the projects were torn down and replaced with other public housing schemes, including developments with a mix of market-rate housing.

In July 1966 the National Guard was called in from Fort Omaha to quell two days of rioting in North Omaha after local youth burnt down several area businesses along the 24th Street corridor. That same year A Time for Burning, a documentary featuring North Omaha, was filmed. Later it was nominated for an Oscar award for best documentary.

In April 1968, the National Guard quelled North Omaha riots that erupted after the assassination of Martin Luther King Jr. In the summer of 1969, riots broke out after a white Omaha police officer fatally shot a 14-year-old girl named Vivian Strong in the back, in the Logan Fontenelle Projects. Three days of rioting effectively destroyed the Near North Omaha business area.

Construction of the North Omaha Freeway in the 1970s is regarded as having added to the decline of Near North Omaha. Research showed that the area experienced a 30 percent housing loss and major increase in crime following construction of the freeway, which broke up the neighborhood. Additional street planning efforts to disrupt the community are believed to include the construction of a large hotel blocking 16th Street and the conversion of North 24th Street to only one-way traffic.

In 1976, Omaha Public Schools began court-ordered busing to achieve integration, which led many Near North Omaha students away from their community for the first time. This period of social activism was when another generation of leaders emerged, such as Ernie Chambers, Brenda Council and Rev. Ken Vavrina.

== Present ==
Since 1975, the community's historic legacy and the larger story of African Americans in the Great Plains has been interpreted by the Great Plains Black History Museum, started by activist Bertha Calloway. This followed her founding of the Negro History Society in 1962. Her nephew has run the museum since Calloway's sickness has caused her retirement.

The bi-annual Native Omaha Days and the long-running Omaha Star newspaper continue to celebrate the community's culture.

Recently the Omaha Storm Chasers proposed building a $54 million stadium as part of a $170 million redevelopment near the Near North Side Omaha's Qwest Center and Creighton University. However, while the stadium plan went through, the Storm Chasers chose to pull out of the project, feeling that the capacity of 24,000 was too large for the team's needs. The new TD Ameritrade Park Omaha, opened in 2011, will now be used primarily for the College World Series, and as the new home for Creighton's baseball program. The Storm Chasers opened their own new stadium in the southern suburb of Papillion in 2011.

Currently the neighborhood has a population of 37,727 and is roughly 65% African-American.

== Historic landmarks ==
The City of Omaha has recognized many buildings and homes on the Near North Side as landmarks. Several have been recognized as nationally significant as well and listed on the National Register of Historic Places.

Name	Year	Location	Notes
Memmen Apartments	1889	2214, 2216, 2218, and 2220 Florence Boulevard	The earliest building included on the NRHP in this neighborhood
Broomfield Rowhouse	1913	2502-2504 Lake Street	Built after the Easter Tornado of 1913.
Webster Telephone Exchange Building	1906	2213 Lake Street	Site of the Great Plains Black History Museum.
St. John's African Methodist Episcopal Church	1921-56	2402 North 22nd Street	
Calvin Memorial Presbyterian Church	1910	3105 North 24th Street	
Dreamland Ballroom	1923	2221 North 24th Street	
Lizzie Robinson House	1910	2864 Corby Street	
Holy Family Catholic Church	1883	915 North 18th Street	
The Sherman	1897	2501 North 16th Street	
Harry Buford House	1929	1804 North 30th Street	
Zion Baptist Church	1913	2215 Grant Street	Built after the Easter Tornado of 1913.

== See also ==
- History of North Omaha, Nebraska
