= Edward Danner =

American politician

Senator Edward Danner

Member of the Nebraska Legislature from the 11th district
- In office 1963–1970
- Preceded by: John Adams Sr.
- Succeeded by: George W. Althouse

Personal details
- Born: February 14, 1900 Guthrie, Oklahoma U.S.
- Died: January 1, 1970 (aged 69)
- Party: Democratic
- Profession: State Legislator

Edward Danner (February 14, 1900 – January 1, 1970) was a butcher and state legislator in Nebraska. A member of the Nebraska state legislature from 1963 until his death in 1970, he represented North Omaha in the state senate. The only African American state senator in Nebraska at the time, he advocated for civil rights and equal protection under the law. He was a Democrat.

== Personal life ==
Danner was born in Guthrie, Oklahoma, in 1900. He settled in Omaha.

== Career ==
Danner worked as a butcher in South Omaha for Swift & Co. He was a field representative and a vice president of the United Packinghouse Workers of America, Local 47, which represented laborers in the meat packing industry.

Danner was a Nebraska state senator beginning in 1963, representing North Omaha. He was the only African-American senator during the civil rights era. Many of the legislative issues Danner worked on included bills decriminalizing interracial marriage and working to create laws to have fair housing enacted in Omaha.

In June 1963, Danner spoke at Nebraska's first civil rights march in Lincoln.

Danner died in office in 1970. Governor Norbert Tiemann appointed George W. Althouse to serve the remainder of his term.

== Personal life ==
Edward Danner had a child in San Francisco before he married. Danner married Emogene Danner. He had nine children.
