= Love's Jazz and Art Center =

Coordinates: 41°16′55″N 95°56′50″W

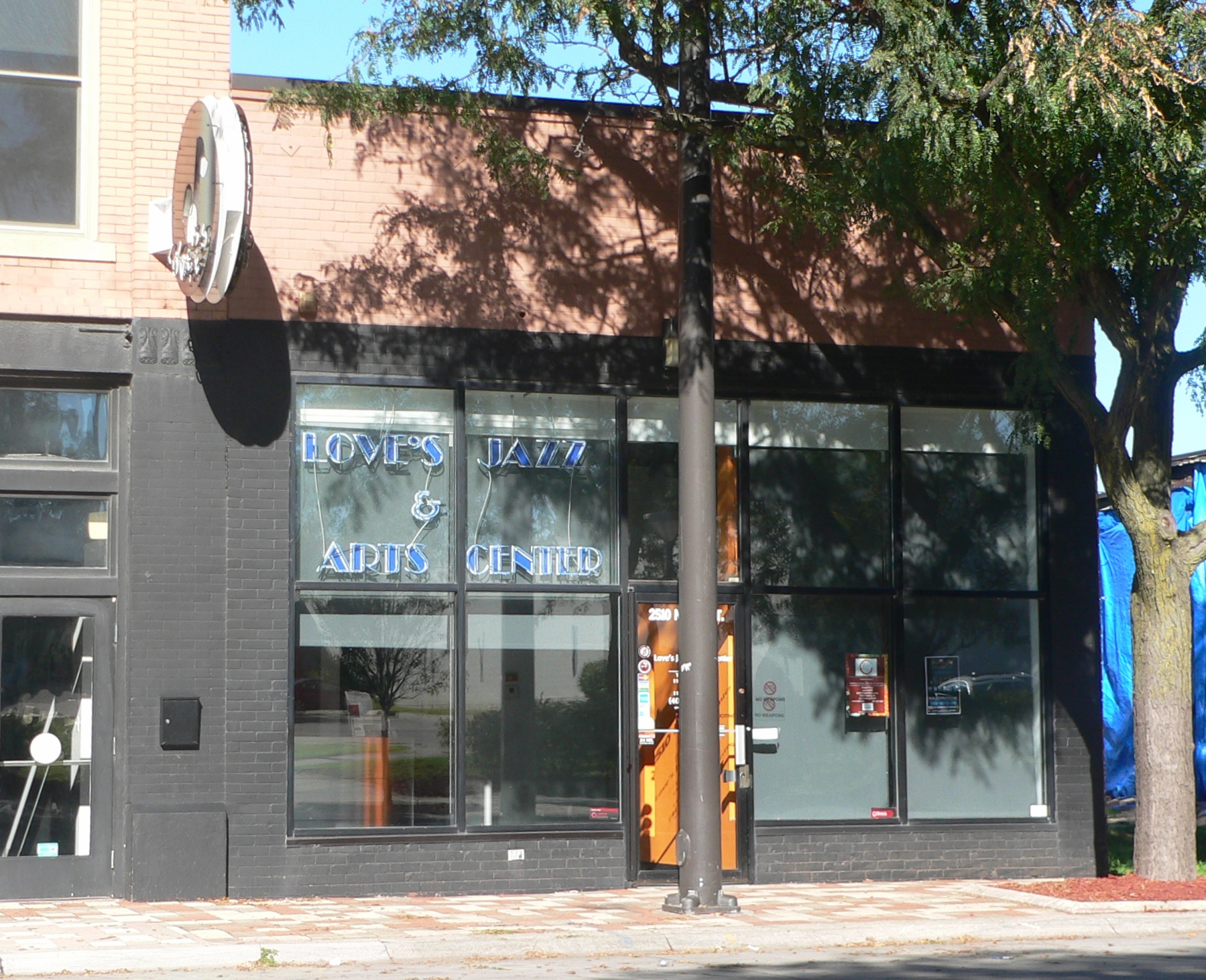
- Front entrance
- Location: 2510 North 24th Street
- Website: http://www.ljac.org/

Love's Jazz and Art Center was located at 2510 North 24th Street in the 24th and Lake Historic District of North Omaha, Nebraska. Founded and named to honor of Omaha jazz great Preston Love, Love's highlighted the African American culture of North Omaha. In addition to sponsoring a variety of events, Love's hosted events for Native Omaha Days.

After operating for 15 years, the organization lost its lease with the City of Omaha in 2020. In 2021, a new organization opened in the space called the North Omaha Music and Arts Center, or NOMA.

== See also ==
- History of North Omaha, Nebraska
- Music in Omaha, Nebraska
- Culture of Omaha, Nebraska
