= Pearl Memorial United Methodist Church =

Methodist church in Omaha, Nebraska, U.S.

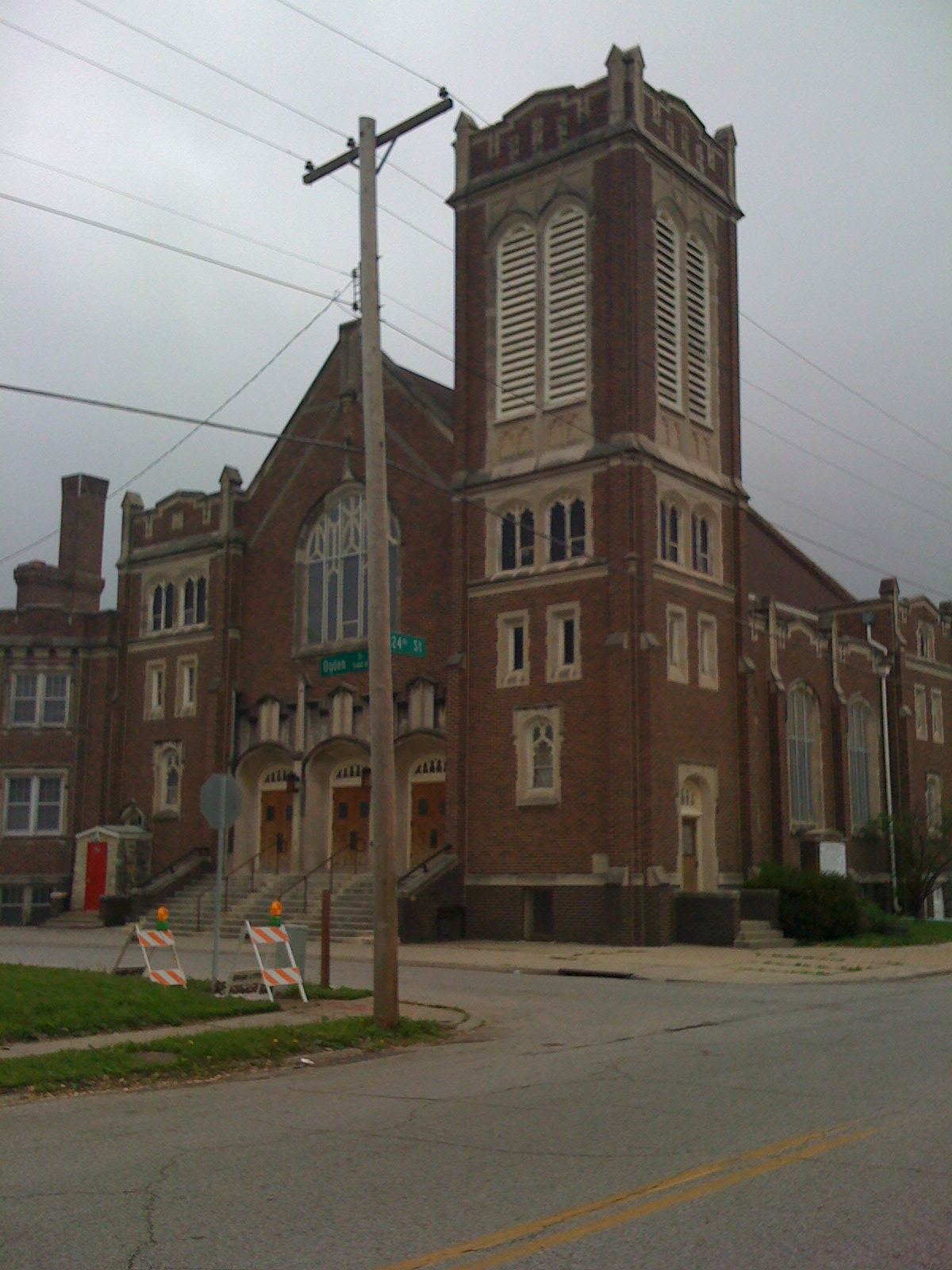
Pearl Memorial United Methodist Church

Pearl Memorial United Methodist Church was a member of the Nebraska Conference of the United Methodist Church that was operated from the 1890s into the 2000s. The former congregation's church is located at 2319 Ogden Street in the Miller Park neighborhood of north Omaha, Nebraska. The church primarily served the Miller Park community.

== History ==
In the 1890s a group worshiping in the "upper room of a drug store" at the corner of 24th and Ames Avenue was organized as a Methodist Episcopal congregation. The first pastor of Pearl was Rev. G. A. Luce. Their first regular church building was constructed in 1905 at N. 24th and Larimore Streets. In 1907, the congregation received a gift of land near the commercial intersection of 24th and Fort Streets, upon which they built the first Methodist church in the community in 1905. When Trinity Methodist Episcopal Church moved from its location in the Near North Side neighborhood, Pearl became the only United Methodist church in North Omaha.

Pearl Memorial was long been a home to athletic activities for local children and youth. From the 1910s through the 1950s the church hosted basketball and baseball teams that played in church leagues across the city. From the 1970s through the 1990s the church hosted a variety of sports for youth in the local community, as well.

Today the Church offers a variety to residents in the surrounding neighborhood, including a food pantry, a youth community center and social services to low-income families.

The church was involved in a controversial Internal Revenue Service investigation regarding a donation made to an advocacy organization called "Omaha Together One Community". The controversy included threats of losing its 501(c)(3) status. Pearl Memorial is no longer listed as a 501(c)(3) organization, however since its change from Pearl United Methodist Church to Living Hope United Methodist Church its 501 (c)(3) is in place.

The congregation disbanded in the early 2000s.

== Building ==
Originally located at 2519 Ames Avenue, Pearl moved to its current facility in 1914. In the late 1920s the church opened an educational and social wing adjacent to the sanctuary, and finished the basement of the church with a grand basketball court. In the 1980s the church renovated a kitchen in the basement to become a commercial-style cooking area, designed to provide training to local job-seekers.

== See also ==
- History of Omaha
- List of churches in Omaha, Nebraska
