= Brenda Council =

American politician

Member of the Nebraska Legislature from the 11th district
- In office January 7, 2009 – January 9, 2013
- Preceded by: Ernie Chambers
- Succeeded by: Ernie Chambers

Personal details
- Born: 1953 or 1954 (age 72–73)
- Party: Democratic
- Spouse: Otha Kenneth Council
- Education: University of Nebraska–Lincoln, Creighton University School of Law

Brenda J. Council (born 1955) is a politician and a disbarred labor lawyer from North Omaha, Nebraska. She represented the 11th District in the Nebraska State Legislature from 2009 to 2013, succeeding longtime state senator Ernie Chambers, who was term-limited. In 2012, Council lost a reelection bid to her former opponent, who was able to run for the seat again after sitting out one term. The same year, Council pleaded guilty to misuse of campaign funds. She was disbarred in 2014.

== Career ==
Council started her legal career in 1977 with the National Labor Relations Board in Kansas City. In 1980, she returned to Omaha to work for Union Pacific Railroad's legal department. Council joined the Kutak Rock Law Firm in 1998 and Polk, Waldman, Wickman & Council in 2002.

Council has served on the Omaha School Board and the Omaha City Council, and ran for mayor in 1994 and 1997, losing both elections by slim margins. She was formerly western regional president of the National Caucus of Black School Board Members. She was featured three times in Ebony Magazine due to her prominence as an Omaha leader, and was a permanent roundtable member of the Omaha KETV television Sunday morning talk show, Kaleidoscope.

In February 2008, Council filed to run for the seat in the Nebraska State Legislature being vacated by Senator Ernie Chambers, who had been a state senator for 38 years but was barred from seeking reelection due to a new term limits law. In November 2008, she was elected to the Nebraska Legislature. Council ran for reelection in 2012 but lost to Chambers, who was able to run for the legislature again after sitting out one four-year term.

== Personal life ==
Council attended Omaha Central High School, then the University of Nebraska–Lincoln, graduating in 1974. She received a Juris Doctor degree from Creighton University School of Law in 1977. She is married to Otha Kenneth Council.

== Awards and honors ==
- Outstanding Young Omahan and Nebraskan
- Nebraska Stat Bar Association's Professionalism Award
- Elizabeth Pittman Award
- Urban League of Nebraska National Prominence Award
- University of Nebraska Alumni Association Award
- Omaha Public School's A+ Award
- Durham Museum's African American Leadership Award
- Nebraska Association of Social Workers' Public Citizen of the Year Award
- NOCCC's Spirit of Advocacy Award
- Women on a Mission for Change Legacy Award
- NOAH's Champion of Change Award
- Nebraska's Voices of Children's Champion for Children Award

Council was selected as one of the RAD Women of Omaha and has been featured in three editions of Ebony magazine.

== Campaign fund violations ==
On September 12, 2012, Council pleaded guilty to two misdemeanor charges that she misused campaign cash at casinos and filed false reports concealing that. She withdrew $63,000 at casinos over several years and deposited $36,000 in cash. In December 2013 she was sentenced to probation and fined $500 for felony wire fraud.

Council was subsequently charged in federal court with wire fraud and pleaded guilty, receiving three years' probation along with fines and assessments of $600. On September 12, 2014, the Nebraska Supreme Court disbarred Council for misusing campaign funds. A referee had recommended a one-year suspension followed by two years of probation, but the Court held that harsher discipline was called for. The court noted that since the 1990s, it had disbarred all but two attorneys in cases of conversion and found that those two cases were distinguishable from Council's case. In both of those cases, the attorney had self-reported the misconduct, a factor not present in Council's case. The court held that the conversion of campaign funds is as serious as converting client funds and warranted disbarment.
