= Holy Family Catholic Church (Omaha, Nebraska) =

Historic church in Nebraska, United States

- Holy Family Church
- U.S. National Register of Historic Places
- Omaha Landmark
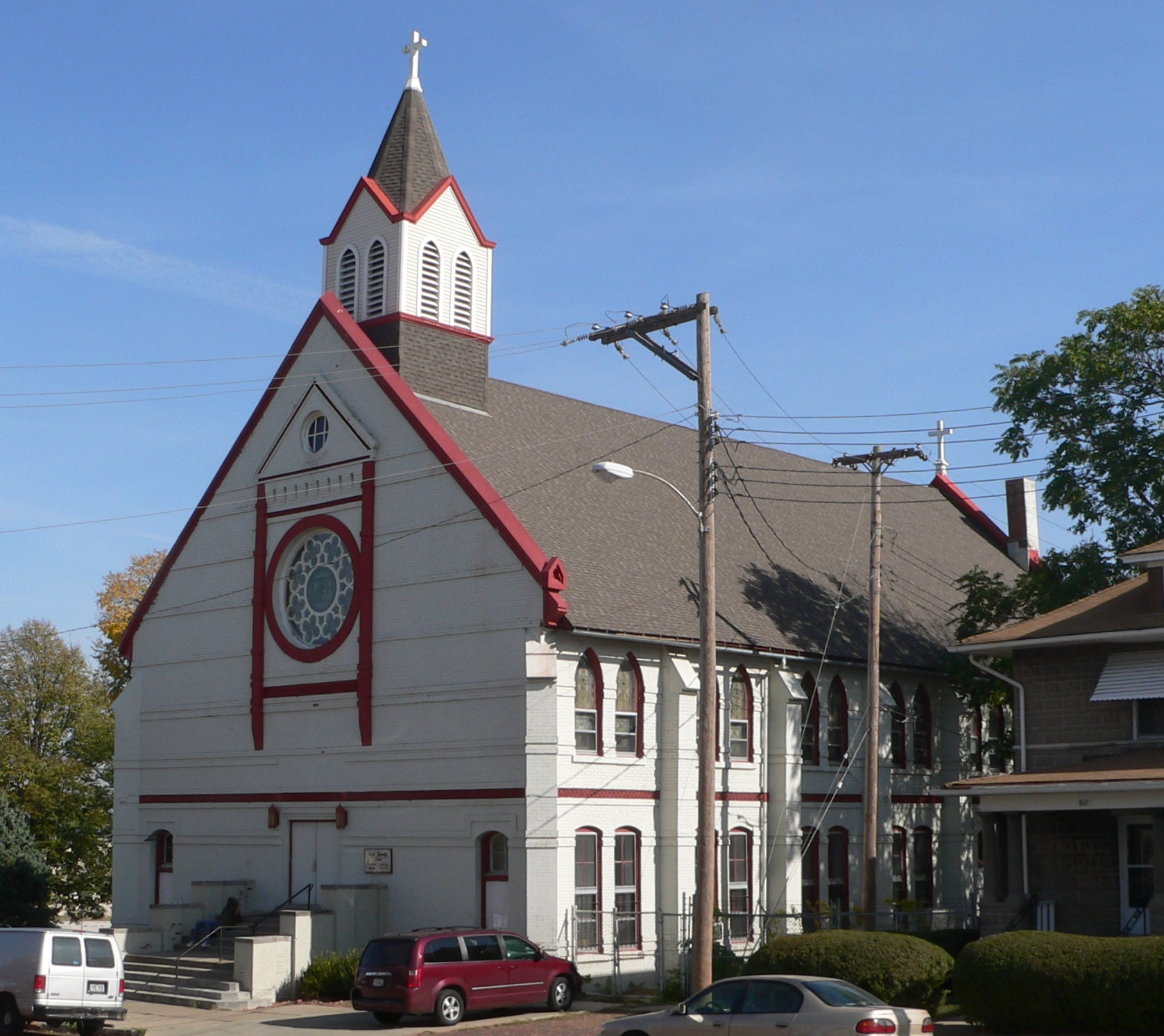
- Church, seen from the northwest, across Izard Street

- Location within Nebraska Location within the United States
- Location: Omaha, Nebraska
- Coordinates: 41°16′6.75″N 95°56′20.01″W
- Built: 1883
- Architect: Cleves Bros.; Et al.
- Architectural style: Gothic
- NRHP reference No.: 86001715

Significant dates
- Added to NRHP: July 17, 1986
- Designated OMAL: October 22, 1985

Holy Family Church was built in 1883 at 1715 Izard Street, at the intersections of 18th and Izard Streets in North Omaha, Nebraska within the Roman Catholic Archdiocese of Omaha. It is the oldest existing Catholic Church in Omaha, and is listed on the National Register of Historic Places.

== History ==
Holy Family Church was built in 1883 for Irish railroad workers and their families. It was designed by Omaha architects Charles and August Cleves in Gothic Revival and Romanesque Revival Style. The complex includes a parish church, school and rectory. Later, the church served Omaha's growing Italian immigrant community. Priests at Holy Family Church were ultimately responsible for establishing Creighton University in the late 1800s. There was also a priest assigned to serve the Omaha's Czech immigrant community in 1915.

Holy Family Church was regarded as a center of progressive activism in the 1960s and 1970s under the pastorate of Father John McCaslin. David Rice, of the Rice/Poindexter Case, was a guitar player at the church in the early 1970s.

The building was designated an Omaha landmark in 1985, and listed on the National Register of Historic Places in 1986. According to the City of Omaha, Holy Family is the oldest remaining brick church structure in the city.

== See also ==
- Landmarks in North Omaha, Nebraska
- Roman Catholic Archdiocese of Omaha
- List of churches in Omaha, Nebraska
