= Rice–Poindexter case =

Murder case

David Rice (also known as Mondo we Langa; 1947 – March 11, 2016) and Edward Poindexter (November 1, 1944 - December 7, 2023) were African-American activists convicted of the murder of Omaha Police Officer Larry Minard. Minard died when a suitcase bomb containing dynamite exploded in a North Omaha home on August 17, 1970. Officer John Tess was also injured in the explosion. Poindexter and Rice had been members of the Black Panther Party.

Their case was, and continues to be, controversial. The Omaha Police recommended withholding exculpatory evidence, a tape of a 911 call, from being played at the trial. The two men had been targeted by the FBI's COINTELPRO (Counter Intelligence Program), which operated against and infiltrated anti-war and civil rights groups, including the Omaha Black Panthers. Amnesty International has been following the case and in 1999 recommended a retrial or release for Rice and Poindexter. The state's parole board recommended the men for release, but political leaders did not act on these recommendations.

== Rice and Poindexter ==
David Rice was born in Omaha on May 21, 1947, graduated from Creighton Preparatory School and took courses at Creighton University. Both are Catholic institutions of learning. He wrote for the local underground paper, Buffalo Chip, from 1969 to 1970 and was a member of the Black Panther Party (BPP). He played guitar at Holy Family Roman Catholic Church, a center of progressive activism in the 1960s and 1970s under the pastorate of Fr. John McCaslin. Rice also ran a breakfast program for inner-city youth and was a well-known community activist. At the time of his death on March 12, 2016, David Rice/Mondo we Langa was a published poet and playwright. Even writing from prison, he had become a major voice for justice and the arts in Nebraska.

Ed Poindexter was born in Omaha in 1944. He was a Vietnam War veteran, and was honorably discharged. Like Rice, Poindexter was a community activist in North Omaha and was elected to the Douglas County Democratic Convention in 1970. During his incarceration in he earned an associate's degree through Southeast Community College, and in 1979 he was transferred to prison in Minnesota to earn a bachelor's degree in human services from Metro State University in St. Paul. He also completed master's degree coursework in industrial systems through Goddard Graduate School in Montpellier, Vermont. In Minnesota he taught self-improvement groups for youths in the prison, ran a juvenile detention hotline, and worked in the prison audio-visual department. Poindexter produced rap songs under the name, "Jammer from the Slammer," and was active in Toastmasters International. He transferred back to Nebraska's prison system in 2006.

== Context of the events in the summer of 1970 ==
In the wake of the 1968 assassination of Martin Luther King Jr., racial tensions in cities across America were high. In March 1968, riots in Omaha led to the shooting of a local high school student during an event in support of segregationist George Wallace's presidential campaign. In the summer of 1970, there was a rash of bombings in the Midwest. Five bombings had occurred in neighboring Iowa, explosions occurred in Wisconsin and Minnesota, and both a police precinct and the Component Concept Corporation suffered bomb damage in Omaha. Members associated with the Black Panther Party were the prime suspects in these bombings. The national BPP had revoked the Omaha chapter for inactivity, so at the time of the August 17, 1970, bombing, Rice and Poindexter were officers of an organization called the National Committee to Combat Fascism.

In July, a warrant was issued to the ATF to search NCCF headquarters for 60 machine guns and 180 sticks of dynamite. The warrant was based on information provided to agent Thomas Sledge by a 12-year-old girl, Marialice Clark, who was the sister of Linda Clark, a girlfriend of Ed Poindexter. Sledge spelled Clark's name incorrectly in his affidavit as Mary Ellis Clark. Sledge claimed that Clark watched five men make a bomb out of dynamite, including Frank and Will Peak, two cousins of Duane Peak, a 16-year-old who would be the state's main witness against Rice and Poindexter. The affidavit claimed the men planted the bomb at Components Concepts Corporation, took a photograph of it there, and came back to NCCF headquarters and showed the photograph to Marialice Clark. The Omaha FBI called the Justice Department in Washington because they had an informant in the NCCF chapter and knew there were no machine guns or dynamite located there. The Justice Department ordered the US Attorney in Omaha, J. William Gallup, to rescind the warrant and cancel the raid. An attorney in the criminal division of the DOJ told him that due to the murders of Fred Hampton and Mark Clark in Chicago in December, 1969, the DOJ wanted no more raids on Black Panther houses.

== August 17 ==
At 2 a.m., a call was made to the Omaha police 911 operator reporting a woman dragged screaming into a vacant house at 2867 Ohio Street. Patrolman James Sledge and his partner Michael Lamson were assigned to the call. (Sledge was the younger brother of ATF agent Thomas Sledge, who himself had been an Omaha Police officer.) Two other cruisers volunteered to go on the call including Larry Minard, John Tess and Paul Rust. A total of four cars carrying eight police officers arrived at 2867 Ohio Street. No neighbors corroborated the information that a woman had been dragged screaming into the vacant house. The caller had given a boarded up house as his address. The police officers noticed a suitcase on its side lying halfway inside and halfway outside the doorway. Five officers stepped over the suitcase and entered the house. Larry Minard tripped over the suitcase as he left 2867 Ohio. The resultant explosion killed him and seriously injured Tess.

== Duane Peak ==
After hiding out for nearly a week, Duane Peak was arrested for the crime on August 28. In his first statement to police, without having consulted an attorney, Peak said that there was an envelope for him at NCCF headquarters on Sunday, August 16. Inside, a note told him to go in back of the Lothrop Drug store and pick up a suitcase, which he did before 5 p.m. He was instructed to take the suitcase to an address near 28th and Ohio at 11 p.m. that night and leave it on the field side of a fence. The note told him to go to a particular payphone before 2 a.m. and wait for a phone call. The phone rang and a woman's voice told him to call 911 and report a woman dragged into 2867 Ohio. The police report indicates that he admitted to placing the 911 call. Peak implicated neither Rice nor Poindexter in his first statement. There are no police reports for August 29 or August 30, so it is unknown who talked to him over the weekend, though in his February 4, 1971, deposition, Peak said that Lt. James Perry interrogated him several times over that weekend. On Monday, August 31, Peak told the County Attorney Art O'Leary in a deposition, that Poindexter had made the bomb at Rice's house, told him to plant it, and then lure the police to the vacant house with an anonymous 911 call. (Peak allegedly carried a suitcase bomb with a clothespin triggering device into three vehicles and to two different residences from 5 p.m. to 11 p.m. that day, at one point putting it in the trunk of a car because there were seven passengers in the car including his two small nieces.) ATF Agent Tom Sledge, brother of the Omaha police officer assigned to the call, was present during Peak's deposition, as were two Omaha Police officers, Bill Coleman and Pitmon Foxall and Peak's attorney, Tom Carey, although Peak had to ask the County Attorney who Carey was.

In this deposition, Peak told the County Attorney that he wanted to "get out of this whole thing." He cannot remember details of his story, such as the name of a woman who drove him from NCCF headquarters to David Rice's house to pick up the suitcase bomb. The County Attorney provided him Norma Aufrecht's name. Peak repeatedly said that Edward Poindexter got a box of dynamite and a suitcase out of David Rice's basement. At the trial, he would change his testimony to implicate another NCCF member, when his new testimony was that Raleigh House drove Duane with a suitcase full of dynamite to David Rice's house, Edward Poindexter took three sticks to make the bomb and put the remaining sticks in a box, which he took into the basement. Peak also claimed that he put the suitcase in the middle of the room standing up, and that someone else must have laid it down in the doorway and armed it to explode. He refused to say that he attached the bomb to the floor, which annoyed Art O'Leary who told him on page 25, "As a practical matter, it doesn't make any difference what the truth is concerning you at all." At other points in the deposition, Peak said that police officers told him Panthers were coming from out of town to eliminate him. He specifically said that Foxall told him he was the last person seen carrying a suitcase at 28th and Ohio that night.

In an interview with the Washington Post on January 8, 1978, County Prosecutor Art O'Leary admitted that he had made a deal with Duane Peak to prosecute him as a juvenile in return for his testimony. O'Leary acknowledged that without Peak's testimony, the pair would not have been convicted.

=== Preliminary hearing ===
At a preliminary hearing on September 28, Peak took the stand and recanted his story, testifying instead that neither Poindexter nor Rice were involved. After a recess, Peak implicated Poindexter and Rice. Peak was at that time wearing dark glasses, which he removed at the request of Rice's attorney, David Herzog. Peak appeared to those present to have been beaten. Herzog asked Peak if he had been threatened during the recess, and if he had discussed his confession to help him remember it. Peak replied in the affirmative to both questions, telling the court that his lawyer was not present when he discussed his confession with county attorney O'Leary.

=== April 1971 trial ===
Poindexter and Rice were tried in Douglas County District Court by a jury consisting of eleven white jurors and one black juror. Deliberations lasted four days before both men were found guilty. The jurors had the opportunity to choose the death penalty or life in prison. They gave them life in prison. The black juror later stated that he voted with the majority on the condition that the death sentence was not imposed.

The case was built upon both Duane Peak's testimony and ATF laboratory analysis of a piece of wire and pliers found in David Rice's house. Alcohol, Tobacco and Firearms Bureau witness Roland Wilder admitted there were 25 points of dissimilarity, and only 15 points of similarity, between a piece of sheet lead cut with Rice's pliers and a piece of wire found in a house next door to the blast site. The type of dynamite the police claimed to have found in David Rice's basement was similar to residue from the bomb. An ATF chemist testified that chunks of dynamite, visible to the naked eye, were found in Poindexter's jacket pocket and Rice's pants pocket. The chemist, Alcohol, Tobacco and Firearms lab tech Kenneth Snow, conceded at the trial to defense attorneys that these traces could have come from matches. None of the attorneys asked him if the particles could have been planted, due to the volume of material found in the pockets. To establish the characters of the pair, the prosecutor presented the court with newsletter articles in which Rice and Poindexter publicly advocated violence toward police.

Both Rice and Poindexter had alibis for the night of the bombing, who testified for the defense. Poindexter went to a movie with a girl named Linda Walker, who was the daughter of a New York City police officer. They were together when they heard the blast. Rice was at a party from 8 p.m. to 4 a.m. at Rae Ann Schmitz's house. She testified as a first year law student and eventually became a member of his legal defense team. Cousins of Duane Peak, Frank and Will Peak, testified that Duane Peak's story of what he did the week before the bombing was a lie. Will Peak provided Poindexter with an alibi for the night that he was accused of building the bomb in David Rice's kitchen. The jury ignored it all. Norma Aufrecht, who allegedly drove Duane Peak from NCCF headquarters to David Rice's house, did not testify. She was charged with conspiracy to commit first degree murder and accessory after the fact. She would have testified that she did not drive Duane Peak on Sunday, August 16, but she was never deposed by the defense. She fled Omaha in fear and did not return to live there for 10 years after the trial.

=== Controversy over evidence ===
Neither Rice's nor Poindexter's fingerprints were found on the dynamite alleged to have been found in Rice's house. During post-conviction hearings, officers were not clear as to the exact location of the dynamite in Rice's basement and changed testimony as to which officer found it. Accusations have been made that the dynamite was planted, suspicions which were even held by ex-Omaha police officer Marvin McClarty. Shortly after Rice's conviction, his house burned to the ground. This eliminated any possibility of exploring the accuracy of police testimony about the dynamite.

Luther Payne, Conroy Gray and Lamont Mitchell were arrested in July, 1970, while transporting dynamite (according to one police report) to the house of an uncle of Vivian Strong, a teenage girl who had been shot in the head by Omaha Police Officer James Loder in 1969. The true destination was Jim Uding's car lot on 72nd Street. Uding was a "fence" and Omaha Police informant who had agreed to buy the dynamite for $10. Shortly after the convictions of Rice and Poindexter, charges against Payne, Gray and Mitchell were dropped.

On October 23, 1980, a copy of the 911 call that lured police to the North Omaha home was discovered at the police station. The tape had never been played at trial. After the trial, in post-conviction proceedings Lt. James Perry testified that he destroyed the tape in 1978 because the trial was "over as far as he was concerned." An FBI memo dated 10/13/70, released after a Freedom of Information Act request, quotes Omaha Assistant Chief of Police Glenn Gates as advising that "any use of tapes of this call might be prejudicial to the police murder trial against two accomplices of PEAK and therefore... he wishes no use of this tape until after the murder trials of PEAK and the two accomplices has been completed." Expert analysis hired by the defense determined in 2006 that the voice on the tape was not the voice of Duane Peak. State and Federal appeals courts denied a new trial based on the voice analysis. The deposition of Duane Peak submitting to voice analysis can be heard in its entirety on YouTube, along with a one-minute comparison of the 911 caller with Peak's voice.

Peak claimed that he lowered his voice to disguise it. Alternately, in his February 4, 1971, deposition, he claimed to have shouted and raised his voice to sound like he was excited. In that deposition, he also claimed that he gave the 911 operator an address on Pratt Street and that the operator asked him his home phone number. In the weeks after the bombing, Peak's brother was said to have identified the voice as Peak's.

=== Circumstantial evidence ===
The state also brought forward as evidence at trial, political literature the two men had written. These included the opinion that "I believe that pigs look very good roasting on a stick... Barbecue for the pig", which had been published by "David L. Rice, Deputy Minister of Information", in a 1970 publication of the United Front Against Fascism. These articles were among many published by various political groups, in the context of the Vietnam War and the Civil Rights Movement. Former Nebraska Governor Frank B. Morrison, who had represented Poindexter at his trial, is quoted: "The reason they were suspected was because they were members of the Black Panthers. [Authorities] had a couple of young Blacks who everybody knew used incendiary language — hateful things that irritated the police. They weren't convicted of murder. They were convicted of rhetoric. The only thing these young fellas did was try to combat all the racial discrimination of the time the wrong way."

In a 1990 British documentary made by George Case and Joe Bullman of Twenty/Twenty Productions, the officer in charge of the investigation, Detective Jack Swanson, affirmed the Omaha Police Department's fear of the Black Panther Party: "We feel we got the two main players in Rice and Poindexter, and I think we did the right thing at the time, because the Black Panther Party ... completely disappeared from the city of Omaha ... and it's ... been the end of that sort of thing in the city of Omaha — and that's 21 years ago."

== Appeals ==
At Rice's appeal in March 1974, Judge Warren Urbom of the Federal District Court found that the police had no probable cause to allow a search of his home, where they had allegedly found the dynamite. Judge Urbom noted the inconsistencies in Lt. James Perry's testimony about the reasons for a search warrant, and concluded "[I]t is impossible for me to credit his testimony." He overturned Rice's conviction and ordered a new trial, in which the evidence of the dynamite could not be used to corroborate the state's case. This ruling was upheld by the Eighth Circuit Court of Appeals in 1975.

The State of Nebraska then appealed to the U.S. Supreme Court. The Supreme Court decided Wolff v. Rice, along with a landmark Fourth Amendment case, Stone v. Powell. The Court held that Fourth Amendment claims would no longer be appealed through the federal courts on a writ of habeas corpus. Beginning with Stone v. Powell, state prisoners could only appeal Fourth Amendment claims to the U.S. Supreme Court on a writ of certiorari from the state's supreme court. Rice's appellate counsel, Father William Cunningham, a Jesuit priest, said to the U.S. Supreme Court at the end of oral arguments that if the Court changed habeas corpus procedures, his client should not be "penalized" and told "at this stage of the game that he has pursued the wrong avenue."

When David Rice applied for a writ of certiorari, per the new rules promulgated under Stone v. Powell, he was told it was too late. His trial attorney, David Herzog, maintains that David Rice has been held in prison in violation of the Constitution for 44 years.

== COINTELPRO ==
After COINTELPRO became public (in 1971) and the Freedom of Information Act was amended (in 1974), Rice and Poindexter were able to access their FBI files. Each file was over a thousand pages long, though they only received small portions upon request.

In 1978, Amnesty International published a report finding that irregular conduct by the FBI during its COINTELPRO operations had undermined the fairness of trials of a number of political activists during the 1970s. This led to the 1980 conviction (and 1981 pardon by President Ronald W. Reagan) of FBI Director L. Patrick Gray and Agent Edward S. Miller. However, beyond the general campaign to discredit and smear BPP members, the particular links between COINTELPRO and this case were uncertain until Senator Chuck Hagel facilitated release of over a thousand pages of relevant documents in 2001.

== Commuting sentences ==
In 1993, the Nebraska Parole Board voted unanimously to commute both men's sentences to time served. The Pardons Board in Nebraska consisted of the governor, the attorney general and the secretary of state. They took no action to commute the sentences per the 1993 recommendation. One Board member even asserted that there were "no circumstances" under which he would consider commutation. In 2014, Ed Poindexter was denied parole. He would not be considered again for 10 years, at which time he would be 79 years of age. Rice died in March 2016, and Poindexter in December 2023.

== See also ==
- Civil rights movement in Omaha, Nebraska
- Timeline of riots and civil unrest in Omaha, Nebraska
- Crime in Omaha
