= Kenneth Vavrina =

Father Ken Vavrina (born 1936) is a Roman Catholic priest and activist in Omaha, Nebraska. He has been involved in many events in North Omaha since returning to Omaha from various mission work abroad in 1993.

Vavrina was born into a Czech family in Clarkson, Nebraska. After being ordained in 1962, he served in Omaha, South Sioux City, and on the Winnebago Indian Reservation. He decided that his mission should go abroad in 1977, and after meeting with Mother Teresa's Sisters of Mercy in Rome, he flew to Yemen to work with lepers. After four years in Yemen, he was jailed and subsequently deported. He then went to Calcutta, India, to work directly with Mother Teresa. From 1993 to 1996 he headed the Catholic Relief Services mission in Liberia, a period which brought him into contact with Liberian President and Dictator, Charles Taylor. He returned to the United States in 1996, and became pastor at St. Richard's Catholic Church in 1998. In 2007, he was transferred to St. Benedict The Moor Church and St. Therese of the Child Jesus, where he served until his retirement in 2011. All three are located in North Omaha.

== Early priesthood ==
Vavrina was ordained in 1962, and his initial posts were on the Winnebago Indian Reservation in northeastern Nebraska, with the Hispanic Catholic community in South Sioux City, and at Sacred Heart in predominately black North Omaha. In 1973, he gathered donations of medicine from Omaha's Creighton University and brought them to the Pine Ridge Indian Reservation in South Dakota, where members of the radical American Indian Movement were holed up in a standoff with the FBI in what is known as the Wounded Knee Incident. Ken remained at Wounded Knee until the shooting was ended, helping treat the wounded and administering religious services to the Native American Catholics there.

== Global mission ==
His mission turned global when he visited the slums in Bangkok, Thailand. While there, he and reflected on a recent speech he attended given by Mother Teresa at Boys Town, Nebraska, and decided that his mission to be to serve the poorest of the poor. On July 13, 1977, he flew to London to meet with the Sisters of Mercy, then to their headquarters in Rome. His first posting was in Yemen where he worked in a leper village and said mass for the Sisters living there. He then joined the Catholic Relief Services in Italy as a part of the group giving aid in the wake of an earthquake there. In 1986, he went to Calcutta, and he eventually became the head of the Catholic Relief Services (CRS) mission there. In 1993, he left Calcutta and went to Liberia. He headed the CRS mission in Liberia until 1996, when bouts with malaria forced him to return to the United States.

== Back to Nebraska ==
Upon returning to the United States, he worked in the small town of Silver Creek, Nebraska. In 1998, he was called to St. Richard's where Priest Daniel Herek was removed after being convicted of sexual assault of a child.

=== Mission in Omaha ===
He is very involved in the Omaha community. He has invited African refugees in Omaha to take part in a Catholic African mass he helped set up at St. Richard's, and to attend St. Richard's Catholic School. This has put him in close contact with the Sudanese refugee population in Omaha (which totals approximately 7,500 and is largely black Christians from Southern Sudan), and prominent Sudanese peace activists such as Bishop Paride Taban have worked with Vavrina and St. Richard's

.

Most of the students at St. Richard's Catholic School are African American, and Vavrina has been a part of that community in North Omaha as well. He is a member of various North Omaha minister's organizations, and has been outspoken in his attempts to calm racial tension in Omaha. When Albert Rucker shot and killed Omaha policeman Jason Tye Pratt, and was himself killed in the shootout that followed, Vavrina invited Rucker's children to attend school at St. Richard's, saying that these children are innocent victims.

Vavrina has also been vocal in Omaha media, frequently writing letters to the Omaha World Herald newspaper and the Omaha Catholic Voice news-monthly calling for peace in Iraq, forgiveness of terrorists and criminals, and openness of the church towards homosexuals.
