= Lizzie Robinson House =

Historic house in Nebraska, United States

- U.S. National Register of Historic Places
- Omaha Landmark
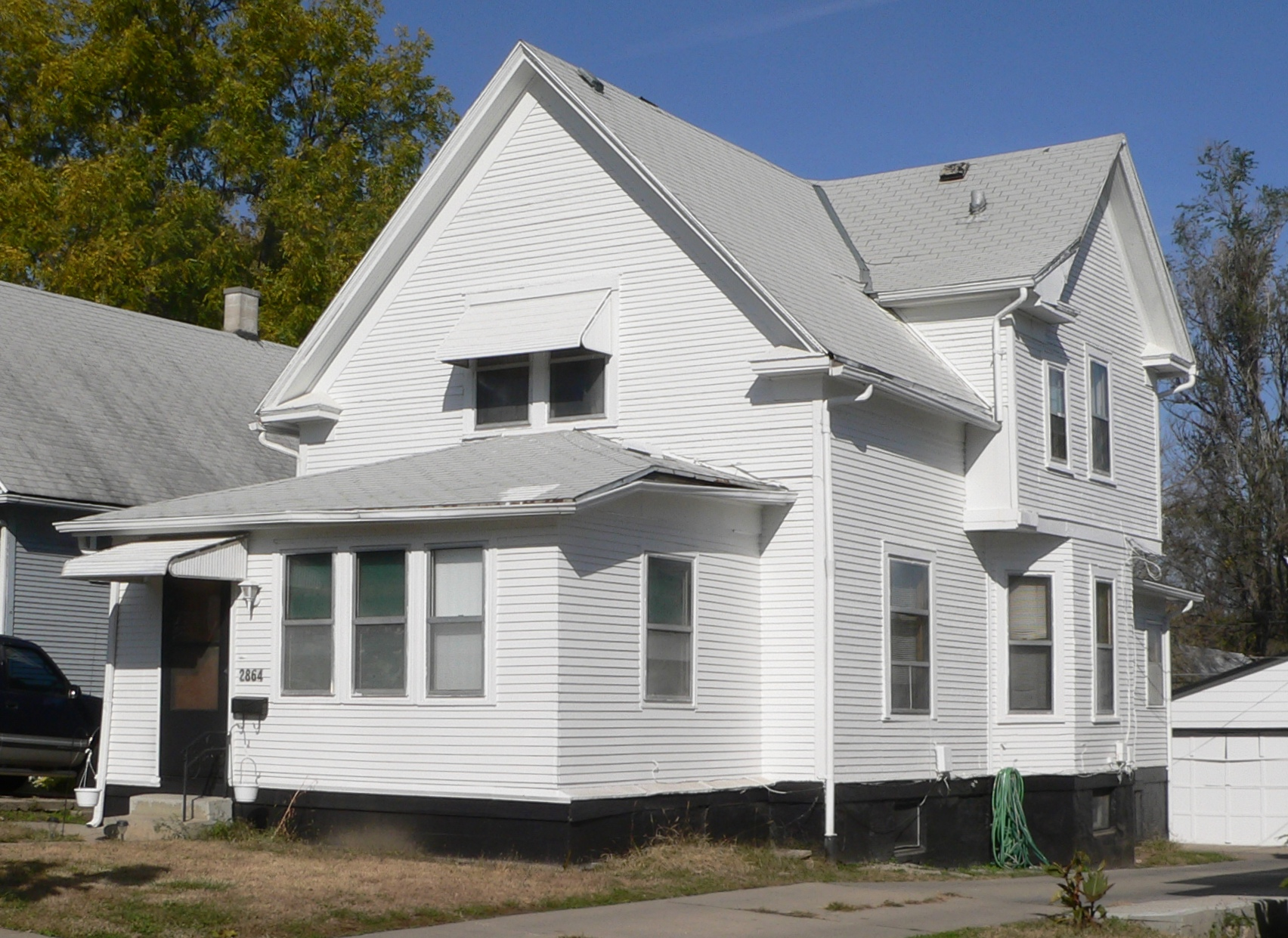
- Lizzie Robinson House, seen from the southeast

- Location within Nebraska Location within the United States
- Location: Omaha, Nebraska
- Coordinates: 41°17′4.29″N 95°57′17.18″W
- Built: 1910
- NRHP reference No.: 93000058

Significant dates
- Added to NRHP: February 25, 1993
- Designated OMAL: June 9, 1992

The Lizzie Robinson House, located at 2864 Corby Street in North Omaha, Nebraska, United States, is the location of the first Church of God in Christ congregation in the state. This was a Pentecostal denomination founded in the late 19th century in Lexington, Mississippi, by Charles Price Jones and Charles Harrison Mason; the latter of whom led the church for decades.

Initially most of the COGIC members and churches were in the Deep South states. During the Great Migration of the first half of the twentieth century, African-American migrants to northern cities established new COGIC congregations across the country.

Built in 1910, the house is listed on the National Register of Historic Places on February 25, 1993, and was designated an Omaha landmark on June 9, 1992.

== About ==
Edward and Lizzie Robinson founded the first Church of God in Christ in the state of Nebraska after they moved to Omaha in 1916 from the South. The Robinsons lived here with their daughter, Ida Baker, from 1916 through 1924. According to the City of Omaha, "Mrs. Robinson is significant historically for her role as organizer of the women’s ministry for the Church of God in Christ, the largest African-American Pentecostal denomination in the world."

== See also ==
- History of North Omaha, Nebraska
- History of Nebraska
- List of churches in Omaha, Nebraska
- Church of God in Christ
