= Calvin Memorial Presbyterian Church =

Historic church in Nebraska, United States

- North Presbyterian Church
- U.S. National Register of Historic Places
- Omaha Landmark
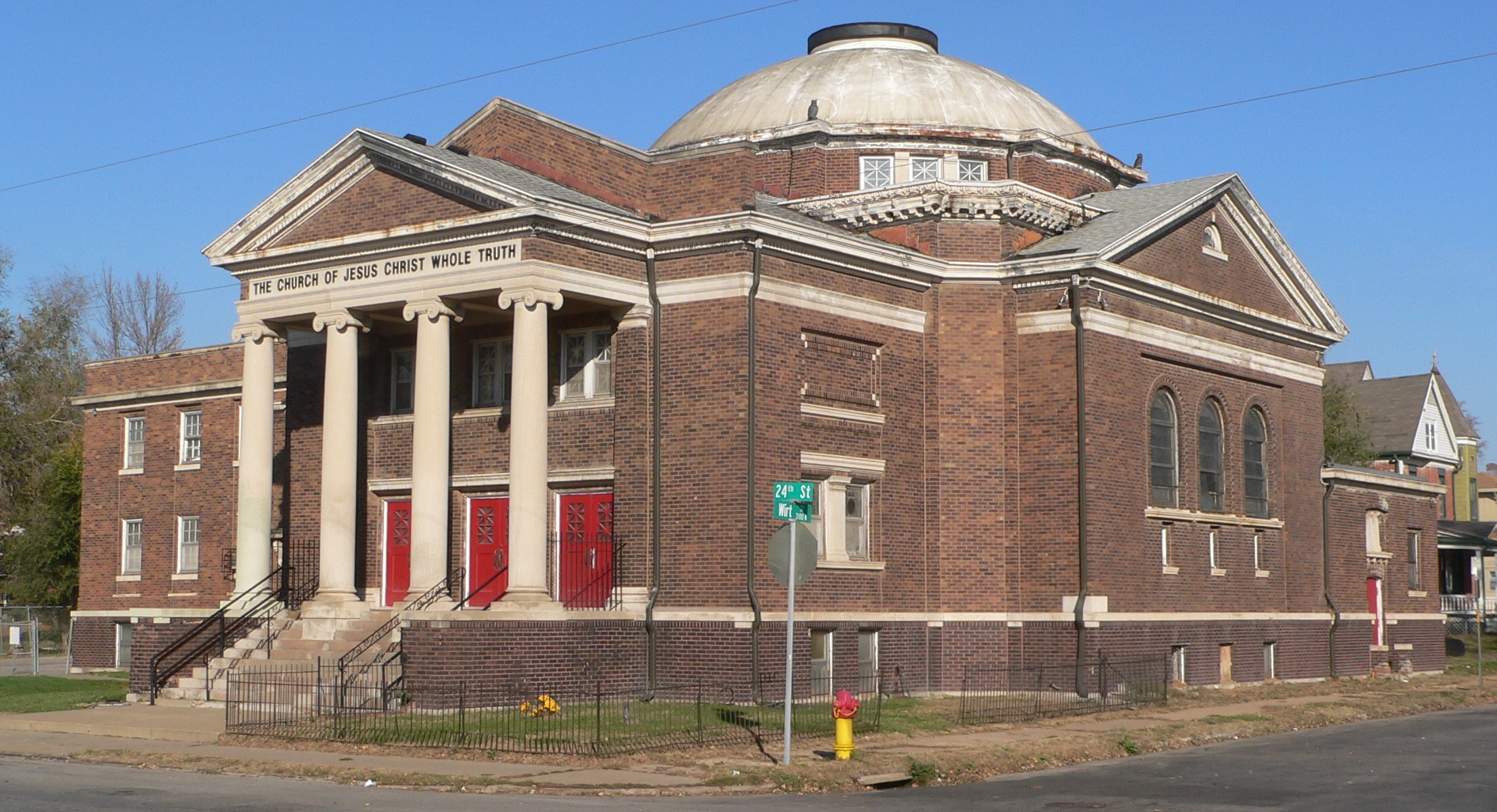

- Location within Nebraska Location within the United States
- Location: Omaha, Nebraska
- Coordinates: 41°17′13.7″N 95°56′47.98″W
- Built: 1910
- Architect: Henninger, F.A.
- Architectural style: Classical Revival
- NRHP reference No.: 86000443

Significant dates
- Added to NRHP: March 20, 1986
- Designated OMAL: January 22, 1985

Calvin Memorial Presbyterian Church, located at 3105 North 24th Street, was formed in 1954 as an integrated congregation in North Omaha, Nebraska. Originally called the North Presbyterian Church, the City of Omaha has reported, "Calvin Memorial Presbyterian Church is architecturally significant to Omaha as a fine example of the Neo-Classical Revival Style of architecture." It was designated a City of Omaha landmark in 1985; it was listed on the National Register of Historic Places as North Presbyterian Church in 1986.

== About ==
Inspired by several buildings of the 1898 Trans-Mississippi and International Exposition held nearby in Kountze Place, the North Presbyterian Church was built in 1910. F. A. Henninger, an influential Omaha architect, designed the building to serve what was then an affluent suburb of Omaha.

Calvin Memorial Presbyterian Church was founded by Rev. Charles E. Tyler, also responsible for founding Hillside Presbyterian church in Omaha.

== See also ==
- History of North Omaha, Nebraska
- Architecture of North Omaha, Nebraska
- Black church
- List of churches in Omaha, Nebraska
