= List of colleges and universities in Nebraska =

The following is a list of colleges and universities in the U.S. state of Nebraska.

== Public colleges and universities ==
There are three regular and two specialized universities in the University of Nebraska system. The Nebraska State College System has three member institutions.

Public colleges and universities in Nebraska
Name	Founded	Location	Enrollment (fall 2024)	System
Chadron State College	1911	Chadron	2,098	NSCS
Peru State College	1867	Peru	1,492	NSCS
Nebraska College of Technical Agriculture	1965	Curtis	222	NU
University of Nebraska at Kearney	1905	Kearney	5,881	NU
University of Nebraska–Lincoln	1869	Lincoln	24,393	NU
University of Nebraska Omaha	1908	Omaha	14,972	NU
University of Nebraska Medical Center	1880	Omaha	3,988	NU
Wayne State College	1910	Wayne	4,666	NSCS

== Private colleges and universities ==
Private colleges and universities in Nebraska
Name	Founded	Location	Religious affiliation	Enrollment (fall 2024)
Bellevue University	1966	Bellevue	Secular	14,667
Bryan College of Health Sciences	1926	Lincoln	Secular	765
Clarkson College	1888	Omaha	Episcopal	1,121
CHI Health School of Radiologic Technology	2019	Omaha	Catholic	29
College of Saint Mary	1923	Omaha	Sisters of Mercy	786
Concordia University Nebraska	1894	Seward	Lutheran	3,479
Creighton University	1878	Omaha	Jesuit	8,581
Doane University	1872	Crete	Christian	1,985
Hastings College	1882	Hastings	Presbyterian	956
Midland University	1883	Fremont	Evangelical Lutheran	1,558
Nebraska Methodist College	1891	Omaha	Methodist	1,067
Nebraska Wesleyan University	1887	Lincoln	Methodist	1,654
Summit Christian College	1951	Gering	Christian	32
Union Adventist University	1891	Lincoln	Seventh-day Adventist	729
York University	1890	York	Churches of Christ	532

== Community colleges ==
The following community colleges are members of the Nebraska Community College Association. In 1971, the Nebraska Legislature began development on a plan to merge the vocational-technical schools and junior colleges. In July 1973, the Nebraska Community College system was established with legislation (LB 759) consolidating junior colleges and vocational/technical schools.

Community colleges in Nebraska
Name	Campus locations	Enrollment (fall 2024)	Previous names
Central Community College	Columbus, Grand Island, Hastings, Kearney	6,927	Central Nebraska Technical College; Platte Junior College
Little Priest Tribal College	Winnebago	218	
Metropolitan Community College	Omaha, Fremont, Elkhorn, La Vista	16,642	Metropolitan Technical Community College, "MetroTech"
Mid-Plains Community College	McCook, North Platte	2,140	McCook Junior College; North Platte Junior College; Mid-Plains Vocational Technical School
Nebraska Indian Community College	Macy, Santee, South Sioux City	620	American Indian Satellite Community College
Northeast Community College	Norfolk, O'Neill, West Point, South Sioux City	5,720	Norfolk Junior College; Northeast Nebraska Technical College
Southeast Community College	Lincoln, Milford, Beatrice	10,816	Fairbury Junior College
Western Nebraska Community College	Scottsbluff, Sidney, Alliance	1,569	Scottsbluff Junior College; Alliance School of Practical Nursing; Western Nebr. Vocational Technical School

== Defunct colleges ==
Defunct colleges and universities in Nebraska
Name	Founded	Closed	Location	Notes
Brownville College	1858	1860	Brownville	Brownville College was organized in December, 1858, with Rev. Thomas W. Tipton as president. The college was short-lived and closed soon after in 1860. Thomas Tipton later became one of the first U.S. senators for Nebraska.
Central Lutheran Theological Seminary	1893	1967	Fremont	Founded in 1893 and finally associated with the Lutheran Church in America, Central Lutheran Theological Seminary operated until 1967, when it was merged with the Lutheran School of Theology at Chicago, Illinois.
Cotner College (Nebraska Christian College)	1889	1933	Bethany Heights (Lincoln)	Cotner College was founded in 1889 by the Nebraska Christian Missionary Alliance and was affiliated with the Disciples of Christ. It was located in the then-independent town of Bethany Heights, Nebraska, which is now part of Lincoln. Bethany Heights was annexed by Lincoln in 1926 and Cotner College closed the Bethany Heights location in 1933. However, Cotner College as an institution continued to exist in various forms, such as the Cotner School of Religion which operated two locations, one opened in 1945 across the street from the University of Nebraska—Lincoln's East Campus and the other opened in 1954 across the street from the University of Nebraska—Lincoln's Downtown Campus. These locations allowed students to minor in religious studies through dual enrollment at both Cotner and the University of Nebraska. Upon the closure of its Bethany Heights location, the medical and dental departments were given over to the University of Nebraska, creating the foundation for those departments at the university. Cotner Blvd. in Lincoln, Nebraska is named after the former college.
The Creative Center	1993	2020	Omaha	The Creative Center college of art & design was a private, for-profit college. Opened in 1993, it offered two and four-year degrees in graphic design. It operated out of a strip mall near 108th & Maple in Northwest Omaha. In 2021, the center announced that it would close, citing declining enrollment.
Custer College	1901	1916	Broken Bow	Founded in 1901, Broken Bow Normal & Business College opened in Broken Bow, Nebraska. It later morphed into the new Custer College, named for Custer County, in 1909. It was reported that Custer College closed its doors in 1916 for unexplained reasons.
Dana College	1884	2010	Blair	Founded in 1884 as a seminary for Lutheran ministry students and had remained a college of the Evangelical Lutheran Church in America. Midland University announced a plan to purchase the college in 2013. Midland backed out of the purchase and Dana College remained closed.
Grace University	1943	2018	Omaha	Closed in 2018. Founded in 1943, Grace was originally intended as an interdenominational Bible institute where Christian men and women might further their theological training. In 2017, a large portion of the school's campus was sold to Omaha Public Schools and announced plans to move to Blair, Nebraska and occupy the former campus of Dana College, which folded in 2010. On October 3, 2017, however, Grace CEO Bill Bauhard announced that Grace University would halt operations at the end of the 2017–2018 academic year, citing financial and enrollment challenges.
Grand Island Baptist College	1892	1931	Grand Island	Grand Island College and Conservatory of Music, originally called Grand Island Academy, was founded by the Baptist Church of Nebraska in 1882. It closed in 1931 and merged with the University of Sioux Falls. Grand Island Senior High School now sits on the former college site.
Grand Island College	1885	1999	Grand Island	Grand Island Business and Normal College was founded in 1885 by professors Hargis, Rucker, and Evans. After a six-state newspaper advertisement campaign that continued until 1910, enrollment at the college grew strongly. Throughout the years, the college underwent several name changes; it was known as Grand Island School of Business and Spencer School of Business. The college became a not-for-profit college was renamed Grand Island College in 1996, but it closed shortly after in 1999 due to declining enrollment.
Hiram Scott College	1965	1972	Scottsbluff	Founded in 1965, Hiram Scott College was one of six colleges started by small-town businessmen on the model of Parsons College in Fairfield, Iowa. The college struggled financially since its start, and closed soon after in 1972. The land and buildings were later acquired by the University of Nebraska–Lincoln in 1974 for its Panhandle Research and Extension Center.
John F. Kennedy College	1965	1975	Wahoo	John F. Kennedy College was founded in 1965 in Wahoo, Nebraska, one of six colleges started by small-town businessmen on the model of Parsons College in Fairfield, Iowa. The college was named after President John F. Kennedy. Due to a drop in enrollment and financial difficulties following the end of the military conscription draft in 1973, Kennedy College closed in 1975. JFK College athletic teams became known for pioneering early intercollegiate women's athletics. The softball team won the first three Women's College World Series championships in 1969–71. The women's basketball team, winners of several AAU titles, helped to further the diplomatic thaw in Sino-American relations in 1973 by representing the U.S. on a tour of games in the People's Republic of China, which was the subject of an article in Sports Illustrated.
John J. Pershing College	1966	1971	Beatrice	John J. Pershing College was founded in 1966 in Beatrice, Nebraska, one of six colleges started by small-town businessmen on the model of Parsons College in Fairfield, Iowa. The college suffered from a lack of funding, high student turnover, and accreditation issues. Ultimately, none of the "Parsons Plan" colleges became economically viable, and all closed by the mid-1970s. Pershing College ceased operating in 1971, and its former site is now occupied by the Beatrice campus of Southeast Community College.
Lincoln Normal University	1892		Lincoln	In 1892, Prof. F. F. Roose founded Lincoln Normal University, to provide "a practical and economical education in the western states." It was located southeast of the Nebraska State Capitol where Madonna Rehabilitation Hospital now stands. Normal Blvd. in Lincoln, Nebraska is named for the former university.
Lincoln School of Commerce	1884	1997	Lincoln	In 1884, Prof. F. F. Roose founded Lincoln Business College, which later merged with the Nebraska School of Business in 1925 to become the Lincoln School of Commerce. It occupied several locations in downtown Lincoln until ultimately moving to its last location on K Street in the 1960s. In April 1997, it was acquired by Educational Medical, Inc. In 2004 the school was renamed the Lincoln campus of Iowa-based Hamilton College. In October 2007, all of the Hamilton campuses were merged into Kaplan University. In March 2018, it became the Lincoln campus of Purdue University Global.
Nebraska College and Divinity School	1868	1885	Nebraska City	In 1868, the Nebraska legislature chartered the Episcopal Nebraska College & Divinity School at Nebraska City. It was created out of the Talbot Hall boys' school founded by Episcopal Bishop Robert Clarkston. In 1872 after a competition for students with Otoe University, also in Nebraska City, Nebraska College and Divinity School purchased Otoe University and moved its operations to that campus. The school closed in 1885 after Bishop George Worthington determined the school could no longer financially continue.
Nebraska University (Fontanelle University)	1855	1872	Fontanelle	Fontanelle, Nebraska was originally organized by the Nebraska Colonization Company, founded in Quincy, Illinois in 1854. The company's goal in founding the town was to develop "a literary institution which shall be known as the Nebraska University." The Nebraska Territory Legislature awarded a charter to the Nebraska University, also called Fontanelle University, in 1855, and the first building was erected in 1856. Operated by the Congregational Church the university flourished for several years. This was the first recorded college to exist in then Nebraska Territory. When Fontanelle lost the county seat, leaders decided to move the university, and Doane College was organized in Crete, Nebraska in 1872.
Otoe University	1859	1872	Nebraska City	Otoe University was founded in 1859 by Nebraska Presbyterians. It was built on land that was purchased from Russell, Majors & Waddell Freight Co. on Sioux Street (which later became Fourth Avenue) between 13th and 14th Streets in Nebraska City. In 1872, Otoe University was closed and taken over by Nebraska College, which purchased the building and grounds and moved to the former Otoe University campus.
Presbyterian Theological Seminary	1891	1943	Omaha	The Presbyterian Theological Seminary was founded in 1891 in downtown Omaha and was moved to Kountze Place in 1902 at 3303 North 21st Place. Many of the faculty here taught at the University of Omaha in its early years. It was closed and converted into apartments in 1943 when the general assembly of the United States Presbyterian Church voted to close the seminary after it failed to meet the minimum accreditation standards of the American Association of Theological Schools.
Nebraska Christian College	1944	2018	Papillion	Nebraska Christian College was a Christian college in Papillion, Nebraska. Established in 1944 in Norfolk, its stated goal was to offer a Bible-based education to prepare people for service and ministry. The college moved to Papillion in 2006. In 2016 the college merged with Hope International University. The campus was closed in 2020.

== See also ==
- List of college athletic programs in Nebraska
- List of colleges and universities in Omaha, Nebraska
- Higher education in the United States
- List of American institutions of higher education
- List of recognized higher education accreditation organizations
- List of colleges and universities
- List of colleges and universities by country
