= Herndon House =

Building in Omaha, Nebraska, United States

Coordinates: 41.258°N 95.928°W

Herndon House/Union Pacific Headquarters
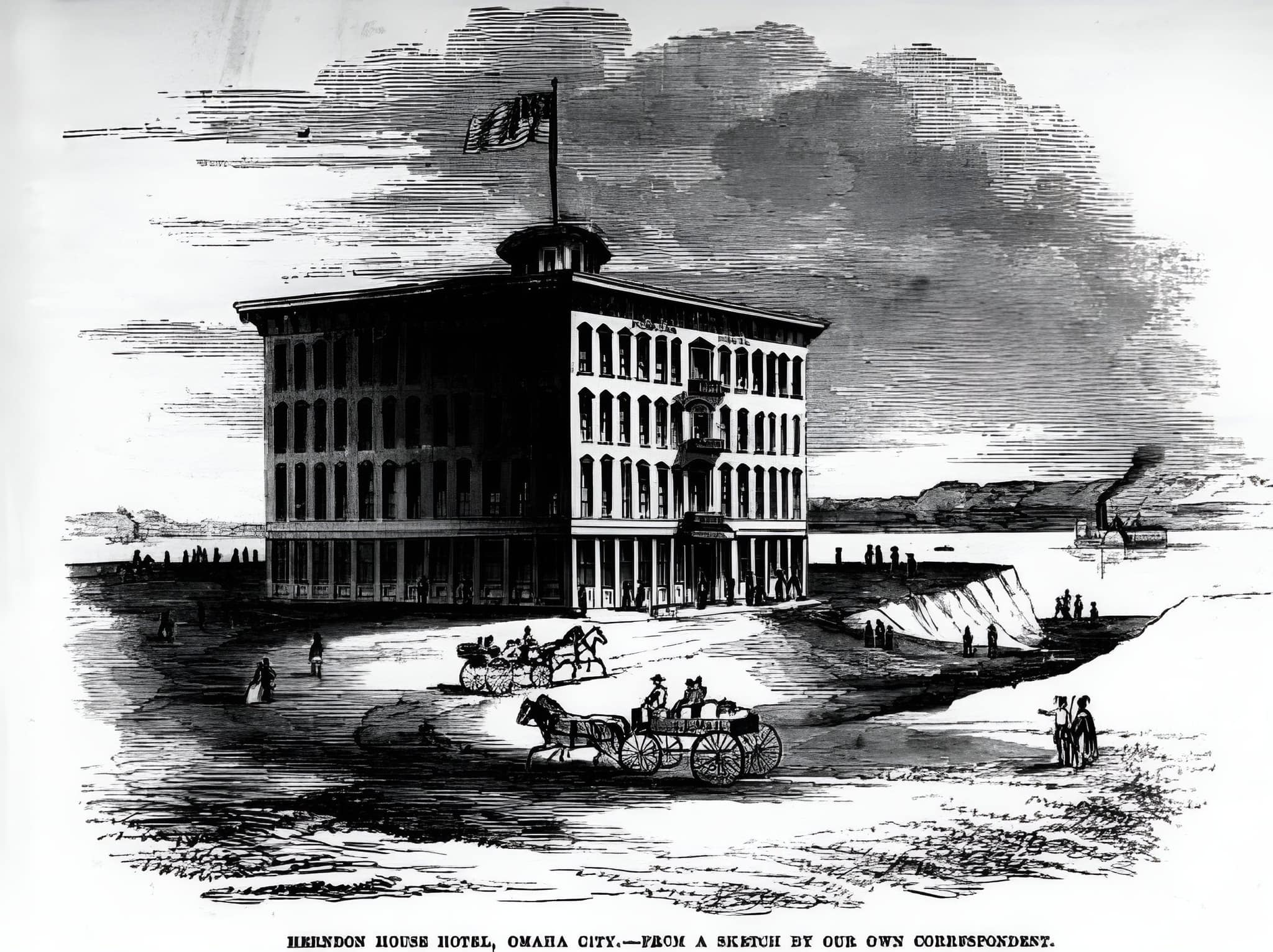
- Illustration of the Herndon Hotel in Omaha, Nebraska
- Interactive map of the Herndon House/Union Pacific Headquarters area

General information
- Location: Omaha, Nebraska, United States
- Construction started: 1858
- Completed: 1858
- Demolished: 1922
- Cost: $16,000

The Herndon House, later known as the International Hotel and then the Union Pacific Headquarters, was an early hotel located at 9th and Farnam Streets in present-day Downtown Omaha, Nebraska. Built in 1858 by Omaha pioneer Dr. George L. Miller along with several associates, it was financed by the sale of city-donated land and a $16,000 loan. It was used as the headquarters building of the Union Pacific Railroad for more than 50 years; it was demolished in 1922.

The hotel was originally named for Lieutenant William Lewis Herndon of the U.S. Navy whose exploration of the Amazon River in the early 1850s captivated the United States. Billed as the best hotel in town, it was one of the finest between Chicago, Illinois and San Francisco, California. The building had more than 100 rooms and featured a fine menu for visitors, including clams and oysters, as well as local game.

Numbered among the guests were political figures, soldiers, railroad men, Indian chiefs, river-boat men, and ranchers. They included William T. Sherman, Major General Grenville M. Dodge, James E. Boyd, David Butler, Alvin Saunders, General John Milton Thayer, Brigham Young, Thomas C. Durant, P. T. Barnum, J. Sterling Morton and P. W. Hitchcock. In 1858 Logan Fontenelle, Joseph LaFlesche, and a contingent including Standing Hawk, No Knife, Young Crane, Little Hill and others stayed at the Herndon for several days, bound for Washington, D.C. to see President James Buchanan. A. J. McCune, one of the early operators of the hotel, also ran the Douglas House, another early Omaha hotel.

In 1860 the dining room of the Hendron House hosted for the first dramatic performance in Omaha, with a borrowed bolt of muslin for a curtain. Julia Dean Hayne, a leading actress of the time, played the title role.

Responding to President Abraham Lincoln's call for soldiers to fight in the Civil War, on May 18, 1861, the newly appointed Nebraska Territory governor, Alvin Saunders, issued a proclamation calling for the immediate raising and equipping of a regiment. The men were mustered into Companies A and B, and were sworn in on the lawn south of Herndon House. In 1862 General James Craig stationed the headquarters of the Military District of Nebraska at the hotel. This placement is credited with eventually leading to the placement of the Omaha Quartermaster Depot, Fort Omaha, and the Department of the Platte in the city. On December 2, 1863, the hotel hosted a massive celebration, including a banquet and ball, for the first construction related to the development of the First transcontinental railroad, which began in Omaha. By 1868 the building was billed as the International Hotel.

In May 1867 eccentric railroad promoter George Francis Train was staying at the Herndon House when a windstorm hit the building. Train requested an African American steward in the hotel to stand with his back to the window he was sitting by, fearing the wind would blow it in and expecting the steward to block the glass with his own body. The hotel steward objected, and Train became angry and declared he would build a better hotel within 60 days. That same day Train bought the lot across the street from the Herndon House and secured a builder. Train asked how much it would cost to construct a three-story, 120 room establishment, and the builder replied $1000 a day. Train said, "Show me you are worth it. I will be back to Omaha in 60 days and expect to sleep in the building." The Cozzens House Hotel was finished upon his return.

== Union Pacific Headquarters Building ==
After the Herndon House closed in 1870, the Union Pacific Railroad leased the building for use as its first general headquarters, and in 1875 the railroad bought the building outright for $42,000. In 1878 the building was completely renovated for $54,000. The offices on the first floor included UP officials in charge of land, express, and coal departments, as well as the Division Superintendent and train dispatcher offices. The auditor, cashier, general superintendent, general freight, ticket agents and paymaster's offices were located on the second floor, and the Atlantic and Pacific Telegraph Company occupied the third story. After vacating the building in 1911, the railroad used it as a storehouse until 1922, when it was demolished.

== See also ==
- History of Omaha
