= Redick Mansion =

Building in Nebraska, United States

Coordinates: 41°17′35″N 95°56′36″W

- Interactive map of the Redick Mansion area

General information
- Architectural style: Flamboyant Queen Anne
- Location: Omaha, Nebraska, United States
- Construction started: 1875
- Completed: 1876
- Relocated: 1917, moved to Minnesota; burned down in 1928
- Client: John I. Redick

The Redick Mansion, also known as the Mayne Mansion and Redick Hall, was located at 3612 North 24th Street in North Omaha, Nebraska. It served as the first home of Omaha University, now known as the University of Nebraska at Omaha, from 1909 through 1917. A five-story tower on the front of the mansion was a notable landmark throughout the area.

== Early history ==
Henry and Mary Meyers built a simple wooden farmhouse along rural North 24th Street in 1875. In 1885, Clifton E. Mayne, a local real estate developer and businessman, bought the house, which was now located in a new suburb called Kountze Place. Using profits from his recent development called Orchard Hill, Mayne grew the house into a 20-room mansion, with a five-story tower and a wide veranda encircling the entire first floor. A large parlor, a dining room and a spacious entry hall greeted guests, along with tall chimneys, exotic woodwork and elegant fixtures throughout the house. In 1889, John I. Redick bought the residence after Mayne fell into financial difficulty. In 1898, the mansion was located across the street from the Trans-Mississippi and International Exposition. John Redick's son, Oak C. Redick, sold the house for $30,000 to the newly formed Municipal University of Omaha in 1907.

== Omaha University ==
In 1909, Omaha University paid for the building and moved in, renaming it Redick Hall. The first classes were held there on September 14, 1909, for twenty-six students, nineteen of them graduates of Omaha High School. The building was used for classes and offices, and the adjacent carriage house was used as the science laboratory. The parlor was converted into a chapel and a resting room made available for female students. Faculty for the fledgling university came from the nearby Omaha Presbyterian Theological Seminary.

The campus developed quickly with the addition of Jacobs Gymnasium and Joslyn Hall, as well as a College of Law, all on the original Redick Mansion property. In 1917, the building was sold to a local grain dealer who had it disassembled and moved by train to a resort on Keeley Island on Lake Shetek near Currie, Minnesota, where it became the Valhalla Dance Pavilion and Cafe until it burnt down on March 3, 1928.

Omaha University moved to its Dodge Street location starting in 1936.

== See also ==
- History of Omaha
