= Traintown =

Traintown may refer to:

- 3D Ultra Lionel Traintown, a video game
- Sonoma TrainTown Railroad, an amusement park in California, United States

== See also ==
- Train Town, a former suburb of Omaha, Nebraska, United States
