= George P. Bemis =

American politician (1838–1916)

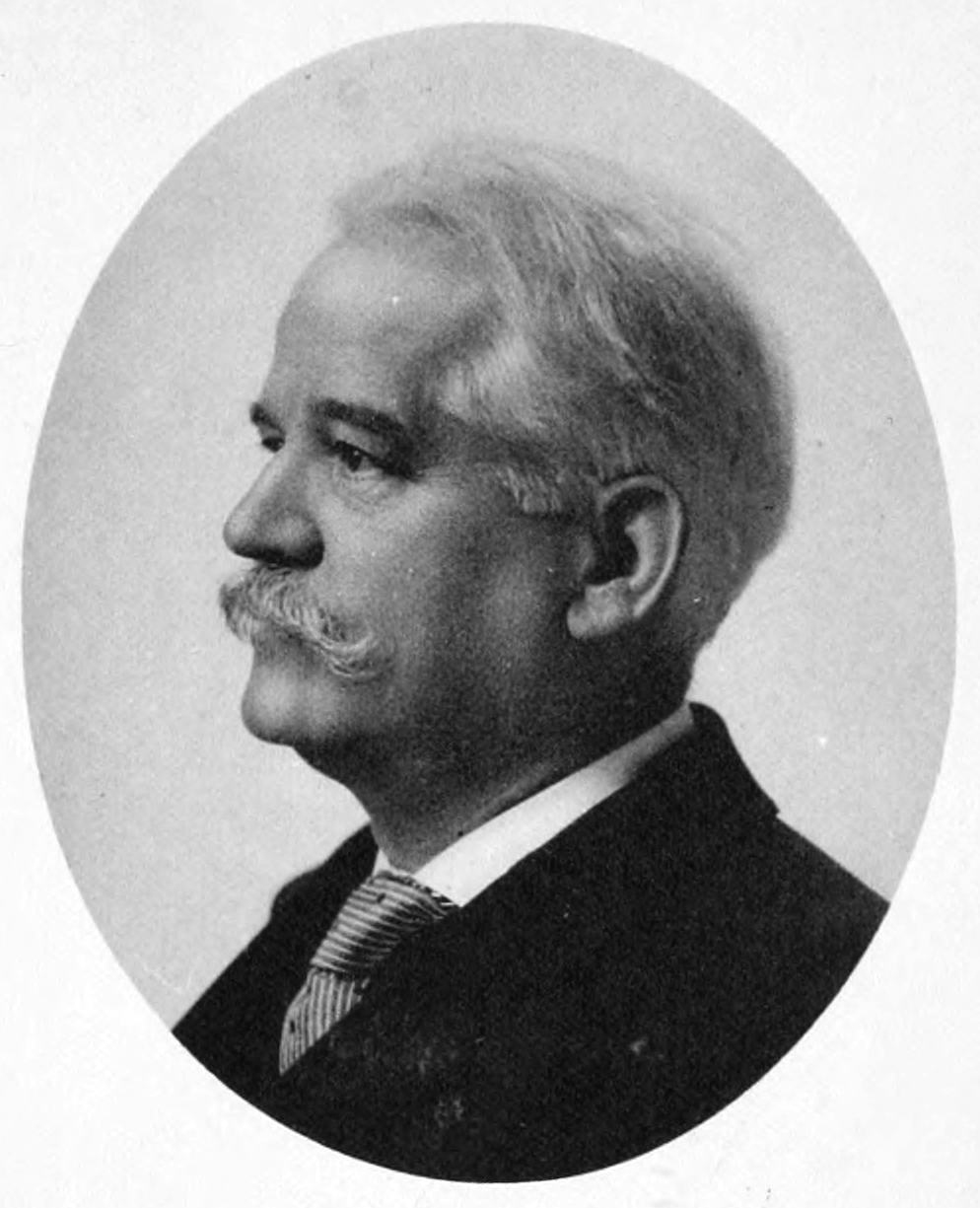
- Bemis c. 1904

24th Mayor of Omaha
- In office January 5, 1892 – January 7, 1896
- Preceded by: Richard C. Cushing
- Succeeded by: William J. Broatch

Personal details
- Born: March 15, 1838 Boston, Massachusetts
- Died: December 11, 1916 (aged 78) Omaha, Nebraska
- Party: Republican
- Spouse: Julia F. Browne
- Occupation: Politician, real estate

George Pickering Bemis (March 15, 1838 – December 11, 1916) worked for nearly two decades as private secretary to his wealthy cousin, George Francis Train. He also acted as a real estate, loan and collection agent, and was later elected to one term as mayor of Omaha, Nebraska, USA.

== Biography ==
Bemis was born in Boston, Massachusetts, to a prominent Massachusetts family. When he was 13 he moved to New York City, New York, spending nearly twenty-five years there. He spent seventeen years as his cousin George Francis Train's private secretary and traveled around the world with him. Bemis traveled extensively, accompanying Train in many tours over and around the world. He came to Omaha in April 1868 as secretary and manager of one of Train's companies, Credit Foncier of America. He quit that job when Train was indicted in New York. in the Credit Mobilier scandal.

On returning to Omaha, Bemis worked as a real estate agent throughout the city, selling lots in the Credit Foncier Addition and focusing on his own subdivision. It has been designated the Bemis Park Landmark Heritage District. As the mayor of Omaha from 1892 to 1896, Bemis did a great deal to promote parks throughout the city.

He supported women's rights and funded a newspaper in the cause in the late 1870s. Bemis' wife, Julia Browne, was a lifelong suffragist who had worked on Susan B. Anthony's paper, The Revolution. Train was the initial funder of this paper. In the early twentieth century, Bemis offered to send $100,000 to the federal government in order to keep the activist Emmeline Pankhurst from being deported in 1913.

== See also ==
- History of Omaha
- List of mayors of Omaha, Nebraska

Preceded by Richard C. Cushing	Mayor of Omaha; 1892–1896	Succeeded by William J. Broatch
