= List of colleges and universities in Omaha, Nebraska =

There are several colleges and universities in Omaha, Nebraska.

== History ==
The earliest institution of higher education promoted in the Omaha-area came from promoters of the Town of Saratoga located around present-day North 24th and Grand Streets in Omaha. The Saratogans won a charter from the Nebraska Territorial Legislature to establish Nebraska University. However, their proposal was delayed in the Legislature, and their university was never more than words on paper.

== Religious institutions ==
Over the next 50 years, several religious institutions emerged in the absence of public support for establishing colleges. For instance, the Catholic Creighton University was opened in 1878. It has grown tremendously in the subsequent 150 years, and continues thriving today. Another Catholic higher education institution in Omaha is the Duchesne Academy. It was founded in 1881 and included a college. The Presbyterian Theological Seminary was built in Kountze Place in 1902 at 3303 North 21st Place, and was closed and converted into apartments in 1943. Many of the faculty here taught at the University of Omaha in its early years. Omaha's Clarkson College was founded in 1888 as a nursing program in a Presbyterian hospital. Evolving over the ensuing century-plus, Clarkson has become a first-tier nursing education facility which is particularly adept at educating non-white nurses. The Nebraska Methodist College was founded in 1891 with a similar mission was the Presbyterian's Clarkson College. Nebraska Methodist offers associate's, bachelor's, master's and doctoral degrees in nursing and allied health professions.

After the turn of the 20th century, a few other religiously supported colleges opened. The Catholic College of Saint Mary was founded in 1923 to ensure that Omaha's Catholic schools had teachers with strong liberal arts educations. In 1943, the Grace University first opened in the former home of the Omaha Presbyterian Theological Seminary in Kountze Place. After remaining there for a year, they moved south of downtown Omaha in 1944 and continued operating at South 10th and Forest Avenue through 2017. Talks are currently underway to move the campus to the former Doane University in Blair. In 2021, Mission University was approved to operate in Nebraska with a primary purpose to extend public health education and services to underserved globally.

== Public institutions ==
The first public higher education institution in Omaha was the University of Nebraska Medical Center. Nebraska's first medical school was a private medical college established in Omaha in 1880 and renamed the Omaha Medical College in 1881. The University of Nebraska bought the school for teaching purposes in 1902, and it became the University of Nebraska Medical College. They opened a university hospital in 1917, and in 1968, the University of Nebraska decided to form the University of Nebraska Medical Center campus. UNMC hospital merged with the nearby Clarkson Hospital in 1997, and was later renamed Nebraska Medicine.

The Omaha School Board first municipal higher education institution in Omaha was the University of Omaha, now the University of Nebraska Omaha, which was founded in 1908 in the Kountze Park neighborhood. Its first classes were located in the Redick Mansion at 24th and Pratt Streets, with a proposed "magnificent campus" slated for development between 21st and 25th Avenues, bounded by Kountze Park and the Carter Lake Park. Original faculty came from the Presbyterian Seminary, as well as Bellevue College. In 1927, businessmen formed the North Omaha Activities Association in order to redevelop Saratoga School's playing field into a football field for the University's football team. At that time the University was located just south in the posh Kountze Place suburb. With new bleachers built to accommodate a crowd of a thousand, the Saratoga Field was home to OU's team until 1951. The University of Omaha moved to 6001 Dodge Street in 1938, where its successor institution the University of Nebraska Omaha (UNO) remains. While UNO is no longer a municipal institution, its still publicly supported.

The Metropolitan Community College was founded in 1971 by the Nebraska Legislature. Today, there are campuses in North Omaha at Fort Omaha, in South Omaha, and in Elkhorn, as well as centers in Bellevue, La Vista and Fremont, the Applied Technology Center and classes at Offutt Air Force Base, and multiple area high schools and offsite locations. In 2011-12, MCC enrolled 32,765 credit students and 17,374 noncredit students.

== Institutions ==
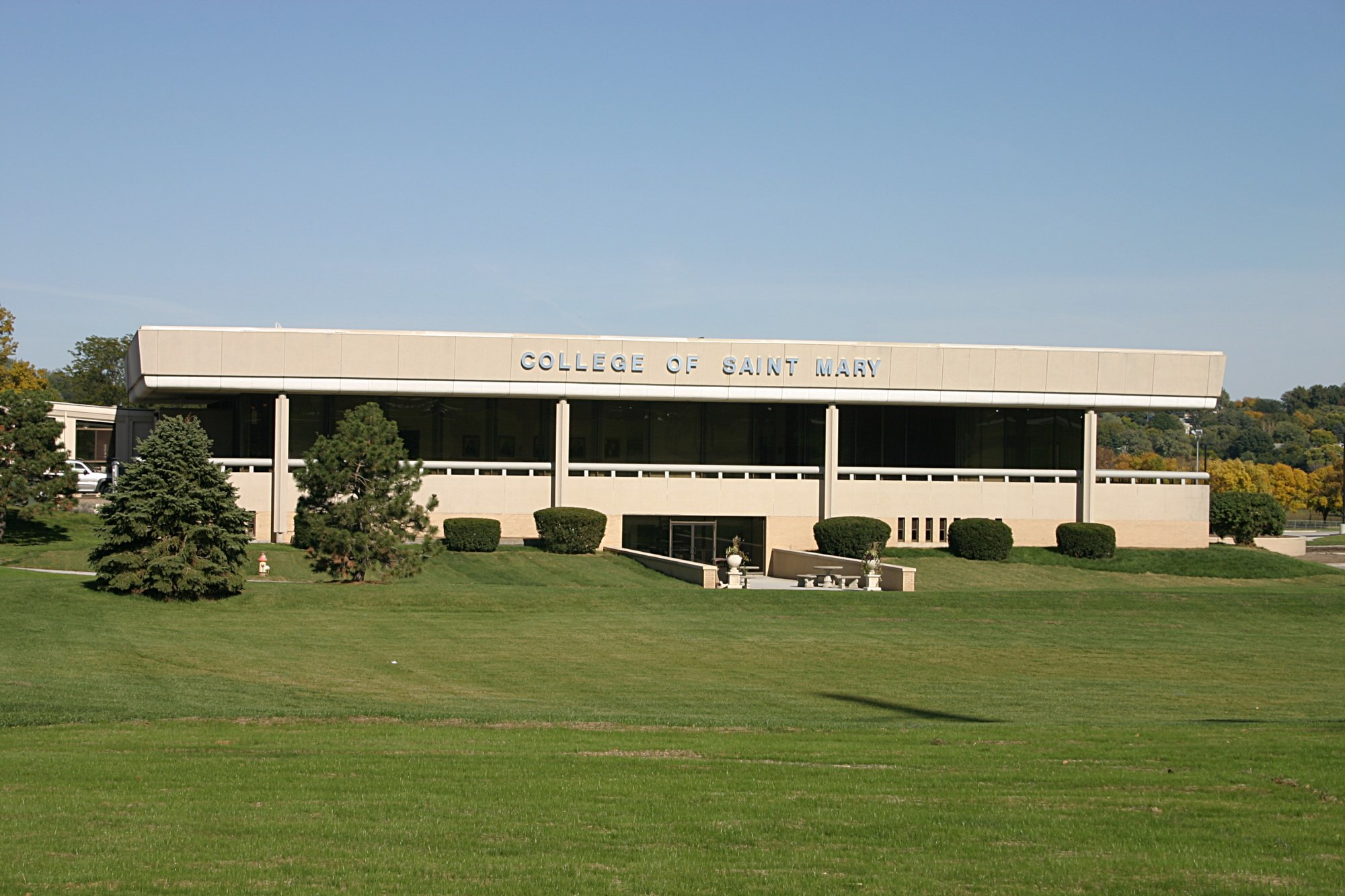
Mercy Hall at the College of Saint Mary in Omaha

Higher education institutions in Omaha
Higher education institution	Type	Religious affiliation	Year opened	Ref
Bellevue University	Private	Secular	1966	
Clarkson College	Private	Episcopal	1888	
College of Saint Mary	Private	Sisters of Mercy	1923	
Creighton University	Private	Jesuit	1878	
Doane College	Private	United Church of Christ	1872	
Metropolitan Community College	Public (community)	Secular	1971	
Nebraska Methodist College	Private	Methodist	1891	
University of Nebraska Omaha	Public	Secular	1908	
University of Nebraska Medical Center	Public	Secular	1869	

Former higher education institutions in Omaha
Former higher education institution	Type	Religious affiliation	Year opened	Ref
Duchesne Academy	Private	Roman Catholic		
Presbyterian Theological Seminary	Private	Presbyterian		
Grace University	Private	Interdenominational		
Doane University	Private	United Church of Christ		

== See also ==
- Education in Omaha, Nebraska
