= Cozzens House Hotel =

Hotel in Nebraska, United States

Coordinates: 41.2563°N 95.9279°W

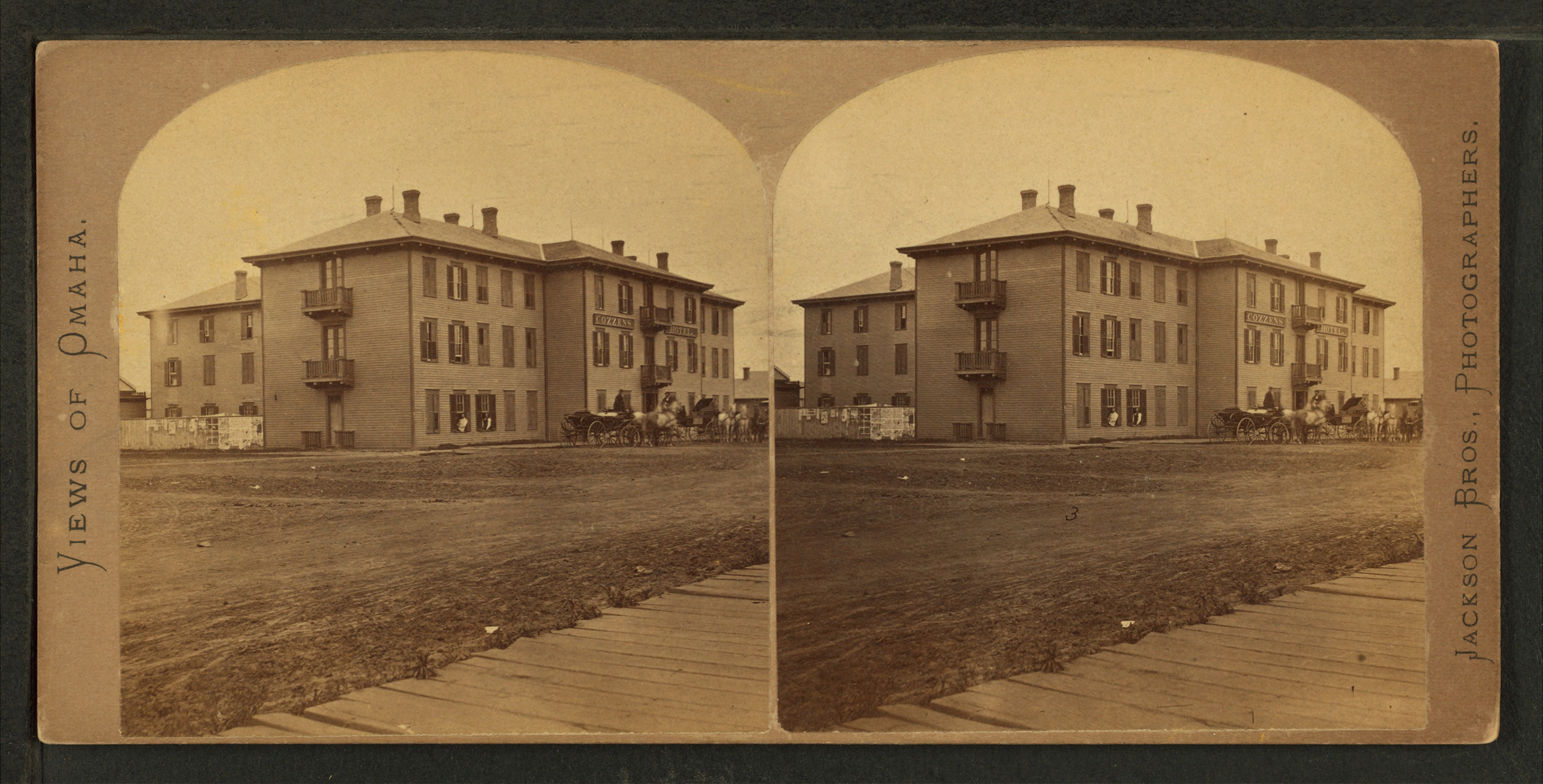
- Cozzens House Hotel
- Interactive map of the Cozzens House Hotel area

General information
- Location: Omaha, Nebraska, United States
- Construction started: 1867
- Completed: 1867
- Demolished: 1902
- Cost: $60,000
- Client: Credit Foncier

The Cozzens House Hotel, later known as the Canfield House, was a pioneer hotel located at 9th & Harney Streets in downtown Omaha, Nebraska. Constructed in by Union Pacific promoter George Francis Train, the 120-room hotel cost $60,000 to build in 1867. The hotel was widely regarded as the finest hotel between Chicago, Illinois, and San Francisco, California, when it was constructed.

== History ==
In May 1867 Train was at the Herndon House in Omaha when a windstorm hit the building. Train requested an African American steward in the hotel to stand with his back to the window he was sitting by, fearing the wind would blow it in and expecting the steward to block the glass with his own body. The hotel steward objected, and Train became angry and declared he would build a better hotel within 60 days. The Cozzens House Hotel, which was called the "Aladdin's Castle of George Francis Train", was his response.

That same day Train bought the lot across the street from the Herndon House and secured a builder for the facility. Asking the builder how much it would cost to make a three-story, 120 room establishment, the builder replied $1,000 a day. Train said, "Show me you are worth it. I will be back to Omaha in 60 days and expect to sleep in the building." The building was finished upon his return. The building was a three-story frame structure in the shape of a T, the front part being 132 feet (40 m) long by 32 feet (9.8 m) wide, and the rear extension is 100 feet (30 m) long and 50 feet (15 m) wide.

Train, whose financing operation called Credit Foncier owned the building, leased it to the Cozzens Hotel of West Point, New York, for $10,000 a year. They kept it for just a year, when they became involved in a lawsuit with the Omaha National Bank that eventually led to their departure.

A local man named Philo Rumsey ran it until 1871, and then closed it. The building then sat empty for ten years afterwards, when J. D. Iler and James G. Chapman bought it in 1881. They rehabilitated the building, adding a brick basement and redesigning the interior. New windows, new chimneys and a new tin roof covered the entire building. A porch was added at the main entrance. At this point the hotel was lit by gas, supplied with hot and cold water, freight and passenger elevators, and regarded as first-class. The building contained 125 rooms after the $15,000 reconstruction. A Nebraska hotelier named George Canfield then ran it from 1888 until 1894, renaming it the "Canfield House."

From 1895 to 1902 the Omaha Presbyterian Theological Seminary was located in the former hotel. It was replaced when the Seminary built a facility in the Kountze Place suburb of North Omaha in 1902. The building was demolished later that year.

== See also ==
- History of Omaha
