= Charles E. Vanderburgh =

American judge

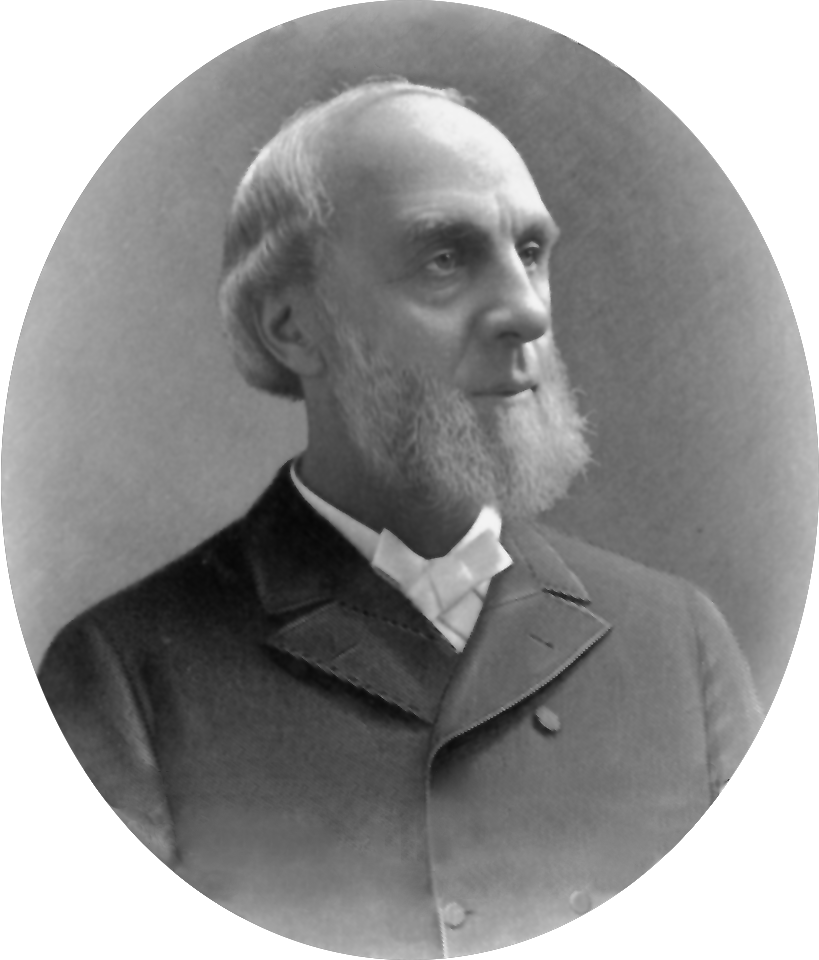
Charles E. Vanderburgh

Charles Edwin Vanderburgh (December 2, 1829 – March, 3, 1898) was an American jurist.

== Biography ==
Charles E. Vanderburgh was born in Saratoga County, New York on December 2, 1829. He graduated from Yale University in 1852, then taught school and studied law in Oxford, New York. In 1856, Vanderburgh moved to Minnesota Territory and practiced law in Minneapolis, Minnesota. From 1860 to 1880, he served as a Minnesota district court judge. From 1882 to 1894, he served on the Minnesota Supreme Court. He then practiced law. Vanderburgh died in Minneapolis.

In 1903, funds from Vanderburgh's estate were bequeathed to the Omaha Presbyterian Theological Seminary to support the construction of the president's home on the seminary's campus.
