= John I. Redick =

American lawyer

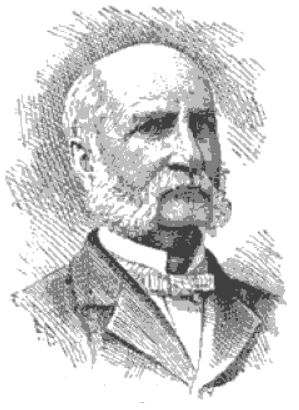
- Born: John Irvin Redick; July 29, 1828; Wooster, Ohio
- Died: April 2, 1906 (aged 77); Los Angeles, California
- Occupations: Lawyer, judge, banker
- Known for: Founding figure in Omaha

John Irvin Redick (July 29, 1828 – April 2, 1906) was a prominent pioneer professional, public, and business figure in Omaha, Nebraska. He was appointed an associate judge of New Mexico Territory by President Ulysses S. Grant.

== Biography ==
Redick was the son of a farmer from Wooster, Ohio who was born July 29, 1828. After attending Delaware College in Delaware, Ohio to learn about the law, Redick moved to Lansing, Michigan to enter the bar. After opening a law office, he also started a real estate practice there.

Redick's first marriage was on November 5, 1855, to Mary E. Higby. She died October 30, 1864. Their children were Charles5 Robinson Redick and William Armstrong Redick.

In 1856 Redick and his wife moved to Omaha. In 1859, Redick joined a man named Clinton Briggs in a partnership. Redick and Briggs were reputed to be "at the head of the bar and were engaged in nearly every important case." In 1864, Redick's wife died.

Redick married Mary A.E. May on October 4, 1866. Their children were John Irwin Redick, Jr., Albert Clarkson Redick, Oak Chatham Redick, George May Redick, and Elmer Stephen Redick.

Throughout his career, Redick served as an attorney for the Union Pacific. He was responsible for constructing more than forty buildings in Omaha, and was one of the men who organized and built the Omaha and Northwestern Railroad. He was also one of the organizers of the Grand Central Hotel company. In 1874 Redick organized and become president of the Omaha Merchant Club.

In February, 1887, Redick moved to Los Angeles, California. There he became the founding president of the Southern California National Bank. John's wife Mary died in August 1894.

In July 1890, Redick married Barbara Lyon. John died 2 April 1906, and Barbara died on April 15, 1908.

== Political career ==
Redick was chairman of the Nebraska Republican delegation to the convention which nominated Abraham Lincoln and Andrew Johnson. He was also chairman of the Nebraska delegation to the convention which nominated President Grant for the second term. In 1876, Grant appointed Redick as an associate judge of the 2nd District Court in New Mexico, from which he resigned after one year.

== Legacy ==
The Redick Mansion was built in 1884 and its 20 acres were sold by the Redick family to the early University of Omaha. It was the first building of the university. Redick Avenue in North Omaha is named after him.

== Prominent buildings ==
- Founding figures of Omaha, Nebraska
- Redick's Opera House
- Redick Mansion

== See also ==
- History of Omaha
