= Staffordshire Potteries Street Railway Company =

English railway company

Staffordshire Potteries Street Railway

Operation
- Locale: Hanley, Burslem
- Open: 13 January 1862
- Close: 2 March 1880
- Status: Closed

Infrastructure
- Track gauge: 1,435 mm (4 ft 8 1/2 in) standard gauge
- Propulsion system: Horse drawn
- Depots: Foundry Street, Hanley

Statistics
- Route length: 1.75 miles (2.82 km)

The Staffordshire Potteries Street Railway operated a horse-drawn tramway service between Hanley and Burslem from 1862 to 1880.

== History ==
The prospectus for the company was issued in October 1861. The tramway was pioneered by George Francis Train. The share sale was quickly successful and ground breaking took place on 27 November 1861 in Waterloo Road, Burslem, near the toll chain.

Progress on construction was rapid and the line opened for passengers on 13 January 1862, terminating temporarily at the Bethel Chapel in Burslem, as there was still 200 yards of rails to lay down. The journey time was between 11 and 12 minutes and the fare was fixed at 3d (equivalent to £1.31 in 2025) each way. One of the disadvantages of the system was that the rails were not flush with the street, and so inconvenienced other road users.

At the first general meeting of shareholders held on 30 January 1862 it was stated that the capital stock account showed an expenditure of £5,261 (equivalent to £553,100 in 2025). This comprised the principal items of 2,966 yards of roadway construction for £4,213 (equivalent to £442,900 in 2025), two cars and freight, £479 15s (equivalent to £50,400 in 2025), seven horses and keep for £170 (equivalent to £17,900 in 2025). For the two weeks ending 26 January 1862, the tramway had carried 5,302 passengers with revenue of £61 7d 4d. (equivalent to £6,661 in 2025). The turnpike tolls for this two week period were £15 0s 9d (equivalent to £1,581 in 2025).

The first year of operation was successful with a dividend of 2½% being declared in January 1863. The tramway was unique in having been built and operated without parliamentary authority, but by wayleave agreement with the turnpike authorities.

In 1865 the operation was leased to G. P. Bradford who carried it on with horse traction, running cars. He also relaid the rails flush with the street surface.

== Closure ==
Ultimately the line was not financially successful. It was undermined when the North Staffordshire Railway Potteries Loop Line of railway had opened in 1873, and traffic fell off considerably despite the reduction in fares. It had cost £6,370 to construct and equip with tramcars, and the company had to pay all of the operating costs out of revenue, which included £300 per annum in turnpike tolls. On 2 March 1880 it was taken over by the North Staffordshire Tramways Company.
