= Darlington Street Railroad Company =

English former railway company

Darlington Street Railroad

Operation
- Locale: Darlington
- Open: 1 January 1862
- Close: 1 January 1865
- Status: Closed

Infrastructure
- Track gauge: 1,435 mm (4 ft 8 1/2 in)
- Propulsion system: Horse

Statistics
- Route length: 1 mile (1.6 km)

Darlington Street Railroad operated a tramway service in Darlington, England, between 1862 and 1865.

== History ==
It was the brainchild of George Francis Train, who had previously attempted to introduce horse tramway services in Birkenhead and London. The company was authorised to raise capital of up to £4,000 and they appointed a contractor for the line, Mr. Hathaway and the rails were manufactured by Barningham of the Albert Hill iron works. The line was laid between the market place and the Stockton and Darlington Railway station and the Workman’s Institute on the Durham Road. Trial tips were operated by the company on Thursday 26 December 1861 and it started public operation on 1 January 1862. There were two tram cars, the Nelson and the Wellington. The fare was 2d.

In November 1862 a load of coals was emptied onto the rails outside the Three Tuns and blocked the line for over four hours. One of the tramcar drivers drove through the coals but this derailed the tramcar. The landlord and his men shovelled the coals back onto the line again. It encountered a number of other major issues including forgery of the tokens needed to use the trams; cows and farmers obstructing the line, and a case which reached Durham Summer Assizes in July 1864 where Charles Miller claimed £50 compensation for the loss of his greyhound.

There was a dispute with the county surveyor over the raised rails on Northgate Bridge, which prevented proper drainage of rainwater. The company agreed in July 1862 to raise the level of the roadway of the bridge to the level of the rail.

At the annual meeting in February 1864 it was reported that the company had made a loss of £110, as against a loss of £77 the previous year. The company had spent £3,704 out of the original capital, but was not proving commercially viable.

== Closure ==
The last day of operation was 1 January 1865. At the annual meeting of shareholders on 28 January 1865 it was revealed that the accounts showed a loss of £250 10s 10d to 31 December 1864 and the directors were authorised to take up the rails and timber and realise the value of the properties of the company. The rails were removed in February, the company was officially declared bankrupt in November, and wound up in December.
