= Frederick Wedge =

American boxer

Frederick R. Wedge
- Frederick Rhinaldo Wedge (1912)
- Born: July 31, 1880; Michigan, U.S.
- Died: March 3, 1953 (aged 72); Napa, California, U.S.
- Other names: "Kid" Wedge, "The Fighting Parson"
- Occupations: Boxer, clergyman, educator

Frederick Rhinaldo Wedge (July 31, 1880 – March 3, 1953) was an American boxer who fought over 70 professional bouts as "Kid" Wedge; an ordained clergyman, who pastored churches in Nebraska, Wisconsin, and California for the Presbyterian, Baptist, and Congregational denominations; a Chautauqua lecturer; an author of several books, including The Fighting Parson of Barbary Coast; and an educator, who taught at Pasadena College, and high schools in Arizona and California, whose admission into the Graduate School of Education of Harvard University in January 1922, and his January 1929 second marriage were both a national cause célèbre in the USA.

== Early life and family ==
Frederick Rhinaldo Wedge was born on July 31, 1880, in Michigan, United States of America, the son of Hugh Wedge (born in Michigan), and Nettie Hunter Wedge (born in Michigan).

Wedge grew up in Martinez, Mecosta County, Michigan. When he was two years old, his father was killed. His mother subsequently married a man who proved to be physically abusive to both her and Wedge. After his mother died when he was 8, making him an orphan, his stepfather abandoned him, and he was sent to live with his father's brother, Isaac Wedge (born December 1856 in French Canada), a sawmill man, and aunt Alice Hunter (born June 1861 in Michigan), who lived at 137 Eagle Street, Pelican, Wisconsin.

As a young boy Wedge worked as a newsboy and sold newspapers, having to defend his location against "street arabs" and prevent theft, and later worked as a helper in various Wisconsin lumber camps, before becoming a lumberjack in Rhinelander, Wisconsin. Wedge soon acquired a reputation as a hard drinker and tough fighter, and "took delight in starting drunken brawls in Rhinelander" and other logging camps, or assaulting policemen. with several convictions for drunk and disorderly conduct, serving a total of 105 days in the Oneida County jail. During this time, Wedge was considered "the rough-and-tumble champion of northern Wisconsin".

== Boxing career ==
By the age of 18 Wedge became a pugilist, fighting under the name "Kid" Wedge. Additionally, Wedge fought in many bar fights, resulting in his skull being fractured twice. Wedge was considered "one of the best rough-and-tumble fighters in the days when loggers and lumberjacks considered gouging, strangling and stamping with their hobnailed boots as fair in a fight". Among his opponents were Clarence English, Abdul the Turk and Jack Carrig.

Wedge fought as "Kid" Wedge in at least seventy professional boxing contests in seven years from 1899. Wedge was discovered and managed by Bill Daniels. Wedge's first professional fight was a ten-round bout with Chicago Jack Glenn, who had ten years professional boxing experience, with Wedge winning in the 9th round after Glenn's corner threw in the sponge after Glenn broke his right hand. On Saturday, July 23, 1904, Wedge was arrested "on suspicion" by a local police officer in Oshkosh, Wisconsin, and ordered to leave town by the police chief.

After three fights in Omaha in the summer of 1905, Wedge met his future wife, Prudence Olive Tracy, for the first time after a concert in Omaha. After realizing that he was uncultured and lacking in education, and with Prudence's encouragement, Wedge began a course of self-education guided by a retired doctor. At the age of 22, Wedge had been illiterate, being unable to read or write. About 1905 Wedge entered a preparatory school and completed twelve years of education in six years. His tutor assisted him with his grammar school education in the evenings after working ten hours each day as a lumberjack. Eventually Wedge graduated from the Rhinelander High School, Rhinelander, Wisconsin.

Wedge was converted in a religious meeting in June 1906 conducted by Presbyterian evangelist Rev. Hay Red Bell (born July 22, 1862, in Illinois; died November 16, 1917, in Missouri), a graduate of Moody Bible Institute. By November 1906 Wedge came to believe that it was wrong to fight except in self-defense, and that he should devote his life to Christian service. Other factors in his decision to retire were that he may have been the loser of several of his more recent bouts, and was also remorseful over the death of an opponent in San Francisco. and was encouraged to do so by Prudence Tracy.

At the time of his retirement in November 1906, Wedge was the lightweight champion of Arkansas. Wedge, who was scheduled to fight Guy Buckles in front of 2,000 fans over six rounds on a sand bar south of Omaha, Nebraska, announced his retirement before the bout to devote his life to Christian service and then gave Buckles a religious tract and a New Testament. Buckles, who was insulted by Wedge's actions, punched Wedge on the nose, however Wedge refused to retaliate, choosing instead to "turn the other cheek". However, after another blow from Buckles, Wedge indicated: "I have not been told what to do next, but I guess I can pound you to pulp without interfering with my conscience". In the ensuing altercation, both fighters were severely disfigured, but Wedge was adjudged the winner. Wedge indicated that he would pray for Buckles.

== Ministry and education ==
=== Nebraska (1906–1910) ===
In 1906 Wedge was admitted to the University of Nebraska, and completed his first year in June 1907.

==== First Presbyterian Church, Barneston (1907–1908) ====
By September 1907 Wedge was appointed the pastor of the First Presbyterian Church in the small village of Barneston, Nebraska, where the Presbyterians had constructed a church building in 1889. However, by March 1908 Wedge had suffered a nervous breakdown.

In November 1908 Wedge announced he would resume boxing as he could not make a living as a preacher, and that he would fight Walter Stanton of San Francisco in Omaha in early December.

On February 22, 1909, Wedge preached a 17-minute sermon just prior to the Buckles-Hanson prize fight in Omaha, Nebraska. On Friday, September 3, 1909, Wedge preached a short sermon and sang a hymn before the fight between Dick Fitzpatrick of Chicago and Guy Buckles.

==== Omaha Presbyterian Theological Seminary (1908–1909) ====
After completing three years at the University of Nebraska, in 1908 Wedge transferred to the Omaha Presbyterian Theological Seminary, a Presbyterian seminary in North Omaha, Nebraska, for a year in order to complete the requirements for ordination in the Presbyterian Church. To finance his studies, Wedge gave boxing lessons in Omaha.

==== Presbyterian Church, Monroe, Nebraska (1909–1910) ====
After graduation from Omaha Theological Seminary in September 1909 Wedge was ordained by the Nebraska Presbytery, and elected pastor of the small Presbyterian Church in Monroe, Nebraska, but later was forced to leave due to opposition to his pugilistic past, and the embarrassment caused by his fiancée canceling their wedding amid rumors of Wedge's immorality.

=== San Francisco (1910–1911) ===
After his fiancée Prudence Tracy cancelled their planned wedding in 1909, Wedge left university in his junior year and moved to San Francisco. By the end of April 1910 Wedge moved to San Francisco and lived in a boarding house at 633 Vallejo Street in San Francisco and served as a missionary to San Francisco's Barbary Coast, described as the "most infamous blot on the underworld, where depravity reigned supreme, despite the officers of the law, and where booze and immoral women turned men to moral lepers". Herbert Asbury described the Barbary Coast: "The slums of Singapore at their foulest, the dens of Shanghai at their dirtiest, the waterfront at Port Said at its vicious worst – none of these backwaters of depravity and vice ... achieved the depths of corruption that typified the 'Barbary Coast'". When Wedge arrived there was "over six hundred dance halls and dives" in "a district little over half a mile square". Engaged by the City of San Francisco, during the next few months, Wedge "waged a campaign on vice and corruption in Chinatown and the Barbary Coast". A contemporary report indicates that Wedge "carried the battle to the very doors of the hidden opium dens; he ferreted out the leaders of the tong wars and slave girl rings, and left Chinatown renovated spiritually". Wedge's ministry was considered one of the factors responsible for the amelioration of conditions on San Francisco's Barbary Coast. Wedge also was director of boy's work among the newsboys of San Francisco.

On December 1, 1910, Wedge was arrested and incarcerated in the city jail on charges of battery for attempting to strike a night watchman named Gus Miller and begging after being found on Fifth Street near Market Street at 4.30am. Wedge denied the allegations and explained his alcoholic odor as due to his incarceration with drunks and "wine bums", and that he possessed port wine given to him by the Hahnemann Hospital to prevent pneumonia. Wedge was given the sobriquet "The Fighting Parson of the Barbary Coast". In 1917 Wedge explained its origin: "I was preaching on a beer keg in a saloon on the Barbary coast in San Francisco when a couple of toughs went for me. I guess maybe I cleaned out the place then. A reporter on the San Francisco newspaper gave me the name. He said I was a fellow who, if he could not preach good into men, would knock h—l out of them. Those fellows got me, though, and put me in the hospital for a while". After being hospitalized after a vicious assault by several denizens of the Barbary Coast at the corner of Pacific and Montgomery avenues, by the end of 1910 Wedge decided to return to Omaha to recuperate and to attempt to reconcile with Prudence Tracy.

After his marriage to Prudence on December 18, 1910, the newly weds returned to San Francisco to continue Wedge's ministry in the Tenderloin.

=== Nebraska (1912–1913) ===
==== Presbyterian Church, Genoa (1912) ====
By January 1912 Wedge had become the pastor of the Presbyterian Church in Genoa, Nebraska. After his return to Nebraska, Wedge re-enrolled at the University of Nebraska. Wedge's only child, Hugh T. Wedge (died January 20, 1991, in Lake Havasu City, Arizona) was born on January 13, 1912, in Genoa. Wedge had a "fistic encounter" with a lawyer named Rose, whom Wedge whipped in the public street. In the subsequent hearing held by the Kearney Presbytery in July 1912, Wedge admitted conduct unbecoming a minister, and renounced his allegiance to the presbytery. The Presbytery terminated his pastorate at Genoa on July 24, 1912, and suspended him on the ground of insubordination from any ministerial activity until his trial in September.

During his suspension from the ministry, Wedge wrote a novel, The Fighting Parson of Barbary Coast, based in part on his own life and ministry, which was published by November 1912. Wedge dedicated it to Prudence: "to the noble woman who saw good in me when others saw evil; who believed I would win despite every handicap." Wedge trained "Battling" Nelson at St. Joe, Wisconsin, in early September as he was "run down and needed the exercise", where he also engaged in street preaching.

On September 24, 1912, Wedge was found not guilty of all charges, after he explained that Rose had "attempted pugilistic tactics by insolent words and by puffing out his chest, ... he annoyed my wife when she was in poor health". Wedge refused $3,000 to box again on the orpheum circuit and another offer of $125 a week to play a militant preacher in a New York Bowery play, in order to accept the Presbyterian Church's offer to be an evangelist on the Nebraska home mission district for $800 a year.

About 1912 Wedge held a series of religious meetings at the Presbyterian church in Table Rock, Nebraska. In December 1912 Wedge was tried but found not guilty in the "celebrated" trial of State v. Fred Wedge in Nebraska.

On June 5, 1913, Wedge announced his resignation from the ministry in Eureka, California, as "the call of the blood was too strong". Wedge announced: "I am quitting the ministry for several sufficient reasons. My forehead is too low, my jaw is too square. I like the things of the world too well". A few hours later Wedge was arrested and incarcerated overnight in the city jail due to public intoxication after a charge by Rev. Arthur Hayes Sargent (Born May 18, 1879, in Corinth, Vermont; died August 9, 1969, in Portland, Maine), pastor of the Eureka Universalist church, who with some other local ministers had tried to rescue him. However, on September 21, 1913, Wedge spoke at the Church of Christ in Lincoln, Nebraska.

By May 1914 Wedge was claimed to have fought and "never suffered defeat", and in 1922 his record was given as having "fought 70 fights and lost but three of them".

In the Summer of 1914 Wedge gave lectures on his life at Chautauquas at Lodi, California, in May, Modesto, California, in June, and Butte, Montana, in July. In December 1914 The Beatrice Daily Sun reported Wedge's "fall from grace".

=== Wisconsin (1916–1917) ===
==== First Baptist Church, Rhinelander (1916–1917) ====
By May 1916 Wedge became the pastor of the First Baptist Church in Rhinelander, Wisconsin. While pastoring the Rhineland church, Wedge complete courses at the University of Wisconsin. Despite his retirement from boxing, Wedge, known as "the Fighting Parson", supported the sport indicating that it was more clean and wholesome than in his era, and inspired youth to lead clean and healthy lives. Consequently, in January 1917 Wedge applied for a license to organize and manage the Rhinelander Amateur Athletic Association in order to train his Sunday School boys and hold bouts in their gymnasium. The Wisconsin Athletic Association approved their licensing on January 2, 1917.

On January 10, 1917, Wedge was arrested on a charge of using slanderous language on January 1, 1917, to a former member of his congregation, whom Wedge had ousted from church membership for irregular conduct. On January 13, 1917, Wedge was jailed for a few hours in Rhinelander after being found guilty of using abusive language. After pleading not guilty, Wedge admitted the charge, but indicated he had been provoked, and refused to pay the fine of $5 and costs. Wedge was released after the fine was paid anonymously. On February 18, 1917, Wedge was admitted to St. Mary's Hospital after collapsing while preaching in the evening service at the Rhinelander First Baptist Church, and was unable to complete the service. On February 23, 1918, Wedge resigned from the First Baptist church due to his health and departed for Hot Springs, Arkansas, where he planned to remain until he regained his health and then return to his pastorate.

After his resignation from the Rhinelander pastorate, Wedge worked erecting silos, but quit as it did not meet his income needs. By July 1917 Wedge had moved to St. Louis, Missouri. After the USA entered World War I, Wedge attempted to enlist in the US Army in order to fight overseas, but was rejected despite being physically fit, because of his use of a dental plate due to his "shortage of teeth, accounted for by the numerous pugilistic encounters he had before entering the ministry". After being rejected for military service, Wedge obtained a job working in a munitions factory in St. Louis, Missouri.

By August 1, 1917, Wedge found employment as a brakeman for the Chicago & Northwestern Railroad on the Antigo, Wisconsin, to Ashland, Wisconsin, line, earning $125 a month, with which he hoped to pay off his debts and accumulate a small "nest egg". Later that month Wedge was involved in a street fight at the rear of a downtown saloon in Antigo, Wisconsin, with a "ham and egger" named "Fighting Leach", that was broken up by the police. Wedge was charged with disorderly conduct, found guilty, and the sentence was suspended.

Wedge discontinued his studies at the University of Nebraska in 1917 in his Senior year and the family moved to Chicago, Illinois.

=== Illinois (1917–1918) ===
==== Olivet Presbyterian Church, Chicago (1917) ====
Wedge moved to Chicago, Illinois, where he was the assistant pastor of the Olivet Presbyterian Church in Chicago, where he had 300 young men in his athletic Bible class. At this time Wedge also was the director of the Junior Boys' club of Olivet. While in Chicago, Wedge did a post-graduate course in Greek, Hebrew, and other subjects at the McCormick Theological Seminary.

==== YMCA secretary, Camp Grant (1917–1918) ====
By the end of November 1917, Wedge and his family moved to Rockford, Illinois, where his wife's younger sister Eunice D. Tracy (born 1874 in Ohio) lived. As Wedge had been previously refused admission into the US Army, and as he believed that boxing training would help American soldiers defeat the Germans, Wedge volunteered to be a civilian boxing instructor for the United States Army at Camp Grant near Rockford, Illinois, where he also ministered to the men of the 341st Infantry, 35th Engineers, and the Quartermaster Corps. While at Camp Grant, Wedge became the secretary for the YMCA building No. 4 at Camp Grant, and formed an Ironsides Bible Class among the 86th Division, reviving the motto of Oliver Cromwell's Ironsides: "The Lord of hosts is with us". In December 1917 Wedge was found guilty of using abusive language.

After being hospitalized after a severe bout of influenza in the Winter of 1917–1918, Wedge was diagnosed as having "hasty consumption" (incurable tuberculosis) and given only 2–3 months to live, with the recommendation that he move to a warmer climate. In April 1918 Wedge was discharged from his duties at Camp Grant.

=== Texas (1918–1919) ===
In late April 1918 Wedge was transported to El Paso, Texas, where after a few weeks he worked as a street car motorman for the El Paso and Southwestern Railroad. In May 1918 Wedge wrote: "Whether I get well or die, I am going to keep smiling as long as I can get a bit of air in these old lungs of mine". Needing funds to relocate from El Paso, Texas, to Tucson, Arizona, to enroll in the University of Arizona, and after extensive training which he believed cured him of tuberculosis, and hoping to be able to return to his position as a boxing trainer in the US Army, Wedge returned briefly to the ring by September 1918. After bouts with two border army corps men in preceding months, on January 1, 1919, Hedge fought Sergeant Tommy Murphy, the welterweight champion of the Southwestern United States, who was serving with the US 5th Cavalry at Fort Bliss,. but was knocked out early in the fight and lost the ten round fight on a points decision. Wedge remained in his job in El Paso until July 1919.

=== Arizona (1919–1921) ===
In July 1919 Wedge moved from El Paso to Tucson, Arizona, to begin his studies at the University of Arizona. Initially Wedge worked as a switchman for the Southern Railroad for eight hours each night from midnight. By January 1920 Wedge was employed as a clerk at the Southern Railroad, and lived in a boarding house on East 13th Street, Tucson with his wife and son. After twelve months at the university, Wedge completed his course requirements and graduated in June 1920 with a Bachelor of Arts degree where he studied Hebrew, Greek, Latin, and the sciences. Wedge was able to speak six languages. In Spring 1921 Wedge's application for admission was accepted to the Graduate School of Education at Harvard University, where he planned to earn a Ph.D. in social and educational psychology. To earn sufficient funds to study at Harvard, Wedge accepted the position as the principal of the Union High School in Benson, Arizona.

=== Harvard University (1922) ===
Wedge left Arizona to enroll in the Graduate School of Education of Harvard University on December 31, 1921, with only $10 and "rode the rails" in railroad boxcars for 2,000 miles, arriving in Cambridge, Massachusetts, on January 16, 1922. However, soon after his arrival, Wedge was advised he would not be admitted to Harvard University. Harvard officials rescinded their offer of admission, probably due to the publicity surrounding his pugilistic past, indicating that "despite his degree that he was not scholastically equipped to enter for the degree of doctor of philosophy". Wedge fought to reclaim his place at Harvard, indicating he had renounced his "barbarian ways for the glory of Harvard", and promising that if admitted on probation for a year, he would study hard, and not publicize his past. On February 15, 1922, the Harvard authorities decided to admit Wedge for second semester. Wedge intended to specialize in psychology, and return to teach at the University of Arizona after graduation in 1925.

On March 13, 1922, Wedge appeared in District Court in Watertown, Massachusetts, after being arrested for public intoxication late the previous evening in Mary's lunch room, but was released without penalty as a first offender. After an investigation by Harry W. Holmes, dean of the Graduate School of Education, Wedge was exonerated as it was discovered that he had been ill with the grippe and that his intoxication was due to taking a prescribed dose of medicine that was a mixture of quinine and whiskey. After several weeks in hospital, Wedge left Harvard for Arizona after April 27, 1922. Despite claims by Harvard authorities that he had left Harvard due to a recurrence of tuberculosis, Wedge admitted that he had left as he was missing his wife and son who were still living in Arizona, and that the weather was affecting him adversely. Later he acknowledged that lack of finances also compelled him to leave Harvard. Wedge planned to return to Harvard with his family in September 1922.

In June 1922 Wedge announced plans to produce a film of his life story, in which he would star, with all profits to be used to finance his return to Harvard.

=== California (1922–1923) ===
To earn funds to return to Harvard to complete his post-graduate studies, Wedge moved to Los Angeles, California by the beginning of July, 1922.

==== Congregational Church, Terminal Island (1922–1923) ====
At the beginning of July 1922 Wedge started the Los Angeles, Terminal Union Congregational church at Terminal Island "among the lumber yards and shipbuilding plants of Los Angeles Harbor". Wedge preached to the longshoremen each noon and on Sundays without any compensation. By 1923 Wedge had resigned as the pastor of the Congregational Church on Terminal Island.

In July 1922 Wedge joined the Marine Transport Workers Industrial Union 510 in San Pedro, California, and became a longshoreman. While working as a longshoreman, Wedge joined the Industrial Workers of the World. During the April 1923 San Pedro strike, Wedge addressed about 2,000 strikers at the May Day rally organized by the IWW at Fourth and Beacon Streets, San Pedro. Wedge was one of 26 arrested when the police arrested San Pedro strikers on May 4, 1923, but was released from jail by May 14. Wedge, who was assaulted by a jail officer, became sympathetic to the cause of the IWW and its members. Wedge was eventually elected to the executive board of the IWW. Wedge later used his 15 months of experiences inside the IWW to fulfill his academic requirements and gather data for his thesis, and later to lecture on the IWW. Wedge's self-published book Inside the I.W.W. was published in 1924, with its profits helping meet the cost of further post-graduate studies.

=== Harvard University (1923–1924) ===
Later in 1923 Wedge returned to Harvard and spent twelve months in classes there. Wedge was commended by his Harvard professors for both his academic ability and application.

=== California (1924–1927) ===
By 1924 Wedge transferred to the University of California, Berkeley as a post-graduate student. While studying at UC Berkeley, Wedge and his family lived at the Kittredge Apartments in Berkeley. By August 1924 Wedge was a teaching fellow at UC Berkeley. Rather than accept the position of principal of a local high school, at the end of December 1924 Wedge announced his intention to become an evangelist. However, he subsequently joined the faculty at Redwood City High School.

At the end of December 1924 Wedge announced that after he completed his post-graduate studies at the University of California, that it was his intention to forgo his ambition to become a college professor to become an evangelist, hoping to succeed Billy Sunday, a former professional baseball player who was the best-known evangelist of the early 20th century.

On Sunday evening, May 2, 1926, Wedge preached on the subject "A Knock-out for the Devil" at the First Church of the Nazarene in Oakland, California.

==== Pasadena College (1926–1927) ====
By 1926 Wedge had been awarded a doctor of divinity degree and was recruited by H. Orton Wiley to be the dean of the college of liberal arts at the Church of the Nazarene's Pasadena College, where he was also professor of sociology and psychology.

Wedge resigned from Pasadena College in 1927 to enroll in a master's degree program at Columbia University in New York. Soon after his arrival in New York, Wedge's wife, Prudence, who had been diagnosed with cancer, had two major operations, and was sent to her sister Eunice's home in Freeport, Illinois, to recuperate.

=== Nebraska (1927–1928) ===
==== Presbyterian Church, Monroe (1927) ====
In June 1927 it was announced that Wedge would become the pastor of the Presbyterian church in Monroe, Nebraska, having received 27 of 29 votes cast by the church members. Despite his son Hugh winning the A.A.U. Midwest Lightweight title victory in a boxing bout in Omaha, Nebraska, on January 31, 1928, Wedge filed charges with the A.A.U. against the referee who officiated, alleging he allowed the opponent to foul Hugh repeatedly.

On Friday April 13, 1928, Wedge returned to the University of Nebraska and lectured on the Industrial Workers of the World, drawing on his fifteen months experience as a member.

As Prudence needed to move to California for her recovery, Wedge left Columbia University and traveled to California with his son to establish a home in preparation for her coming. Prudence died in Illinois in May 1928, and was buried in Oakland, California after a funeral conducted by her husband.

=== California (1928–1930) ===
Wedge returned to Berkeley, worked part-time as an undercover prohibition agent, and completed his post-graduate work at the University of California's Summer session in 1928.

While eschewing the use of alcohol, in 1928 Wedge campaigned for the repeal of the Volstead Act and Prohibition arguing they were ineffective, and that training of young people to make good decisions by their parents would be more effective. In November 1928 Wedge led an unsuccessful campaign to repeal California's 10-round boxing law.

==== First Presbyterian Church, Oakland (1928–1929) ====
By January 1929 Wedge was the pastor of the First Presbyterian Church at 2619 Broadway, Oakland, California.

On Friday, July 14, 1933, Hugh Wedge fought Jack Howard over three rounds in an exhibition bout at the Athens Athletic Club in Oakland, California. By September 1935 Hugh Wedge was a successful amateur boxer with aspirations to box as a middleweight in the 1936 Summer Olympic Games in Berlin, Germany, after winning the Diamond Belt titles for simon-pures of Oregon, California, and Arizona. In February 1936 Hugh Wedge sparred with former heavyweight champion Max Baer in Oakland, as part of Baer's efforts to reclaim his title. A third round TKO defeat by Hugh McPhillips in the semi-finals of the Pacific 160-pound championship at the Dreamland auditorium in San Francisco, proved to be the end of Hugh Wedge's Olympic aspirations.

=== Nebraska (1945) ===
By April 1945 Wedge was the pastor of the Union Church in Monroe, Nebraska, and taught boxing to the local boys.

On April 24, 1945, Wedge and Guy Buckles fought for the fourth time in their careers, their first since 1913, a three-round exhibition bout in Monroe, Nebraska, in a boxing carnival organized by Wedge, who was then pastor of the Union Church.

== Personal life ==
Wedge married at least four times, and had one child, a son, Hugh Tracy Wedge.

=== Prudence Olive Tracy (1910–1928) ===
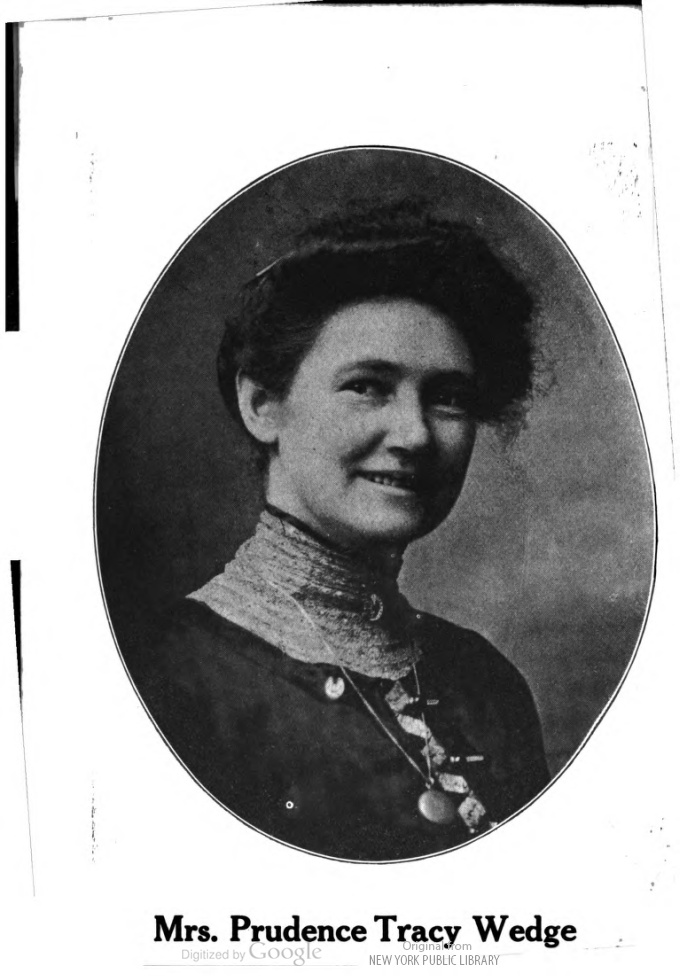
Prudence Olive Tracy Wedge (1912)

After a protracted friendship, a broken engagement and cancelled wedding plans, Wedge married Prudence Olive Tracy (born March 1872 in Ohio; died May 1928 in Freeport, Illinois), the postmistress of Florence, Nebraska, a northern suburb of Omaha, since 1895, a graduate of the University of Nebraska, choir singer and concert musician, and the third of the five children of Sarah E. Smalley (born October 1846 in Ohio; died September 2, 1889, in Ohio) and Jonathan Franklin Tracy (born about 1845 in Otway, Ohio), a Wisconsin physician. on December 18, 1910, in Florence, Nebraska. Prudence had previously been engaged, but broke off her engagement to the other man who had decided to migrate to Canada. Wedge and Prudence were soon engaged, and had announced their wedding date, but Prudence cancelled the wedding after a family friend brought to her mother's attention rumors that Wedge had not really reformed but was rather living an immoral life. In 1909 Wedge resigned from the pastorate and relocated to San Francisco to work as a missionary on the Barbary Coast. After their marriage, the Wedges moved to San Francisco.

Thirteen months later their only child, Hugh Tracy Wedge (born January 13, 1912, born in Genoa, Nebraska; died January 20, 1991, in Lake Havasu City, Arizona) was born.

Prudence was diagnosed with cancer, and had two major operations about 1927, and was sent to her sister Eunice's home in Freeport, Illinois, to recuperate. As Prudence needed to move to California for her recovery, Wedge and Hugh worked their way to California to establish a home in preparation for her coming. However, Prudence died about May 15, 1928, just after Wedge and Hugh arrived at her bedside in Illinois. Prudence was buried in Oakland, California after a funeral conducted by her husband.

On August 20, 1928, Wedge, who was despondent due to the death of Prudence in May, his unemployment, and financial problems, was prevented from committing suicide in his apartment at 2261 Shattuck Avenue, Berkeley, by friends who had received his farewell letters. Wedge wrote a letter of resignation from the Presbyterian church where he held his minister's credentials so that he would not die as a clergyman. Wedge was committed to the psychiatric ward of the Highlands Hospital for several days of observation after a petition by his friend, Rev. Miles B. Davis, pastor of the First Congregational Church in Berkeley.

=== Jennie Mina Holliday (1929) ===
While studying at the University of California Summer session in 1928, Wedge met Jennie Mina Holliday, a fellow student, with whom he soon fell in love, and decided to marry after she had visited him several times when he was hospitalized after his August 1928 suicide attempt. However, his friend Dr. Lapsley Armstrong McAfee (March 31, 1864, in Ashley, Missouri – January 18, 1935, in Dumaguete, Philippine Islands), pastor of the Berkeley Presbyterian Church, refused to perform the ceremony, as it was incompatible with Presbyterian beliefs on divorce and remarriage. Rev. Chauncey David Norris, pastor of the Church of the Nazarene in Berkeley, California, agreed to perform the ceremony. However, after Wedge's denominational leaders protested his intention to marry Holloway, as she had been divorced on the grounds of incompatibility, Wedge decided to break his engagement to Holloway and cancel the wedding. Three hours before the wedding Wedge sent a special delivery letter to Holloway: "It is better for me to remain a lonely Presbyterian minister than to marry you and break God's law. The Bible is against our marriage. While your husband is still living I would be breaking God's law by living with you, even though the laws of California sanction it". However, within hours he reconsidered and announced his intention to resign as pastor of the First Presbyterian Church of Oakland, California, and also from the Presbyterian denomination and to marry Holloway. The wedding was held in the evening of January 25, 1929, two hours later than scheduled, in Holloway's Oakland home, with Hugh Wedge as best man and Holloway's daughter, Mrs Jeanette Dale, the bridesmaid.

On the day after the wedding, Rev. Charles Smith, District Superintendent of the Northern California District of the Church of the Nazarene, contacted Norris and advised him that he had no right under Nazarene polity to conduct the wedding of a person who had divorced unless adultery was the grounds, and that he would "unfrock him for marrying a person divorced on grounds outside those recognized by the church". Norris was confident he would be exonerated after Nazarene authorities investigated the situation. On Monday, January 28, 1929, Norris met with Wedge in the bridal suite on the seventh floor of the Hotel Oakland, and quarreled about the wedding. Norris initially refused to file the paperwork for the wedding, as he claimed Wedge had lied to him about the marital status of Holloway, creating the impression that she was a widow. After Wedge threatened to file a mandamus suit against him, Norris filed the paperwork at the hall of records. Wedge indicated that: "To save his own ecclesiastical hide, Norris would like to get me out on a limb and then saw the limb off". Wedge insisted that even if the church did not recognize the legality of his wedding, that "we are married in the eyes of God and that is enough to satisfy me". Wedge also indicated that while he expected never to be given a pastorate again, that he had no intention of resigning from the church: "They may keep me from preaching, but they won't kick me out of the church". Wedge planned to train and manage his son, who was a promising amateur boxer, but on January 30, 1929, Hugh informed his father that he had decided not to sign a contract with him, and to remain in high school and then work in a foundry. After this argument with his son, Wedge indicated that he lost control and contemplated throwing himself out of his hotel window to spare his bride anymore humiliation.

Within a week of his wedding, Wedge had been committed to the psychiatric ward in the Highland Hospital in Oakland, California, for observation after admitting to an alienist that he had been obsessed with either strangling his new wife or defenestrating her during their honeymoon. Wedge also confessed that "for several months I have been fighting a desire to kill myself. For weeks I would want to slash my throat every time I picked up a razor. Every time I looked out of a high window I wanted to jump out. I am a sick man and for my own protection and for the protection of my loved ones I want to be locked up and be placed where I can harm neither myself or anyone else". Wedge believed his condition was caused by damage caused by a frontal skull fracture sustained in a saloon fight about 1899, and exacerbated by the stress caused by the publicity surrounding his wedding and resignation from the church.

Jennie Wedge announced on 1 February 1929 that she would be seeking to have her marriage to Wedge annulled. She was reported as saying: "If he is mentally unbalanced I am sorry. But I could never live with him again. I would be in constant fear of my life. We had been so happy all week long until this sudden threat of his to kill me and then himself". On February 2, 1929, Jennie Wedge applied in the superior court to have her marriage to Wedge annulled on the basis of his "unsound mind" and his fraud, alleging that Wedge "falsely and fraudulently" represented that he had sufficient funds to provide for her immediate needs, whereas he had insufficient funds to pay the $100 bill for their honeymoon suite. Also on February 2, 1929, Wedge was charged with insanity at his own request, with the papers signed by his son, Hugh. On February 5, 1929, Wedge was declared insane and committed to the Napa State Hospital, "an insane asylum" in Napa, California.

Wedge's marriage to Holliday was annulled after June 1929.

After his father's committal, Hugh Wedge lived with relatives in Emeryville, California, where he attended Emeryville High School. After graduation in 1931, Hugh Wedge was accepted into the University of California, Berkeley, where he was part of the USC boxing team.

=== Viola M. Anderson (1930) ===
By the beginning of April 1930 Wedge was listed as being an unmarried author, and living in the Union Mission, a two-story frame building for indigent men, at 126 South Marengo Avenue, Pasadena. On April 15, 1930 The Los Angeles Times announced Wedge's intention to marry Viola M. Anderson (born about 1900 in Wisconsin), a stenographer residing in Montebello, California, with her Swedish father.

Wedge lived in Berkeley, California until 1932, taught psychology at Pasadena College, and wrote several books, as well as filled the pulpit in several cities.

=== Matilda Trueds (1933) ===
On Tuesday, April 4, 1933, Wedge married divorcee Matilda Trueds, a traveler and writer from Sweden, in Seattle, Washington, in a ceremony conducted by his friend, Rev. Mark A. Matthews. Wedge was arrested on August 8, 1933, in the lobby of the Royal Hotel at Twentieth Street and San Pablo Avenue, Oakland, for being drunk and disturbing hotel patrons.

On September 16, 1933, Hugh married Marion Phyllis Hohl, a secretary, in Oakland, California.

== Death ==
Wedge moved from Oakland, California, to Napa, California, and lived with his son, Hugh. Wedge died on March 3, 1953, in Napa.

== Works ==
- The Fighting Parson of Barbary Coast. Columbus, Nebraska: Tribune Printing Company, 1912.
- "From Prize Ring to Doors of Harvard". Boston Globe (February 13, 1922).
- "On the San Pedro Slave Market".
- "Inside the IWW, by a Former Member and Official: A Study of the Behavior of the IWW, with Reference to Primary Causes" (1924).
