= Credit Foncier of America =

- Industry: Financing, railroads, real estate
- Founded: 1866
- Defunct: 1870s
- Fate: Bankrupt
- Headquarters: Omaha, Nebraska; Denver, Colorado; Tacoma, Washington
- Key people: George Francis Train

Credit Foncier of America was a late 19th-century financing and real estate company in Omaha, Nebraska. The company existed primarily to promote the townsites along the Union Pacific Railroad, and was incorporated by a special act of the Nebraska Legislature in 1866. Credit Foncier was said to be "intimately connected with all the early towns along the Union Pacific."

While related to George Francis Train's Crédit Mobilier company, Credit Foncier was not involved in the Crédit Mobilier scandals that tore that organization apart.

== About ==
Founded, controlled, and initially owned by eccentric railroad booster George Francis Train, Credit Foncier was named after Credit Foncier de France. Along with support from businessman Cyrus McCormick, Omaha banker Augustus Kountze was among the original "special commissioners" appointed by the Legislature to form the company. The company is said to have been organized to "profitably dispose" of the Union Pacific's land grant acreage.

The company owned almost 5000 lots in Omaha; 1000 in Council Bluffs, Iowa, and several hundred in Columbus, Nebraska, along with other land along the Union Pacific mainline. Train once explained, "One of my plans was the creation of a chain of great towns across the continent, connecting Boston and San Francisco by a highway of magnificent cities." The company built a hotel it called the "Credit Foncier" in Cleveland, Nebraska in 1868; it was moved to Columbus the next year. George Train, with so much land in the city, predicted a great future for Columbus. Train is credited with writing newspaper articles and delivering speeches in which he promoted the town, calling it, "Columbus, the new center of the Union and quite probably the future capital of the U.S.A."

Train served as president of the company; George P. Bemis, who later became mayor of Omaha, was the secretary. Train built the Cozzens House Hotel in Omaha. He also developed a tract at the southern edge of Omaha, originally called "Train Town" for its owner and still entitled "Credit Foncier Addition" in city records. This yielded Train "a small fortune" as he sold homes and empty lots to new settlers.

Train later moved the headquarters of Credit Foncier to Denver, Colorado, and again to Tacoma, Washington. Along with Omaha, Train promised each city it would become the "gleaming metropolis" of the Union Pacific.

== See also ==
- History of Omaha
