= George F. Shepard House =

Landmark house in North Omaha, Nebraska

- Location within Nebraska
- 41°17′14″N 95°56′21″W
- Location: Omaha, Nebraska

History
- Built: 1903

Site notes
- Architect: George F. Shepard
- Architectural style: Queen Anne/Beaux-Arts

Omaha Landmark
- Designated: July 14, 1981

The George F. Shepard House is located at 1802 Wirt Street in the Kountze Place neighborhood on the north end of Omaha, Nebraska. Built in 1903 in the Queen Anne/Beaux-Arts style, it was designated an Omaha Landmark in 1981.

== About ==
George F. Sheperd was a stonemason and artist in Omaha at the time of the 1898 Trans-Mississippi Exposition in Kountze Place. The Shepard House reflects that influence. With stone cutter's precision, Shepard personalized much of the residence with marble and stone etchings. One of Sheperd's Classical-styled works is owned by the Nebraska Art Collection housed in Kearney, Nebraska.

The focus of an intense battle over historical preservation in Omaha in 1981, the house's restoration was financed by the Omaha City Council that year. Shortly after, it was listed as an official Omaha Landmark. Today it remains in good condition and serves as an anchor for the historical neighborhood surrounding it.
