= George Francis Train =

American businessman (1829–1904)

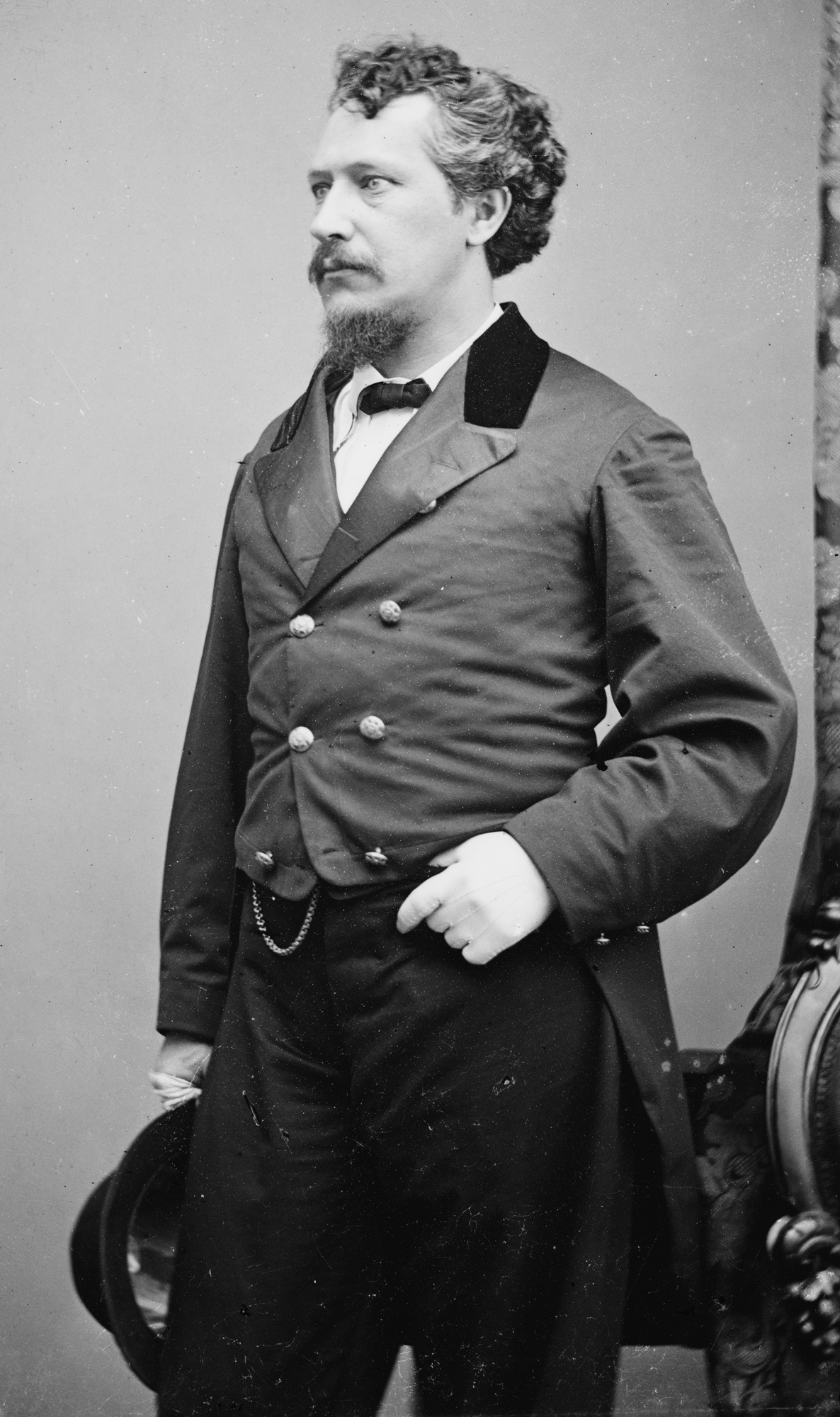
- Born: March 24, 1829; Boston
- Died: January 18, 1904 (aged 74); New York City
- Occupation: Businessman
- Known for: Around-the-world traveling; political activism
- Relatives: Adeline Train Whitney (cousin)

George Francis Train (March 24, 1829 – January 18, 1904) was an American businessman who organized the clipper ship line that sailed around Cape Horn to San Francisco; he also was an organizer of the Union Pacific Railroad and the Crédit Mobilier in the United States in 1864 to construct the eastern portion of the Transcontinental Railroad, and a horse tramway company in England while there during the American Civil War.

In 1870 Train made the first of three widely publicized trips around the globe. He believed that a report of his first journey in a French periodical inspired Jules Verne's novel Around the World in Eighty Days; protagonist Phileas Fogg may have been modeled on him.

In 1872, he ran for president of the United States as an independent candidate. That year, he was jailed on obscenity charges while defending suffragist Victoria Woodhull against charges regarding an article her newspaper had published on an alleged adulterous affair. Despite business successes in early life, he became known as he aged as an increasingly eccentric figure in American and Australian history.

== Early life and education ==
George Francis Train was born on March 24, 1829, in Boston, son of Oliver Train and his wife Maria Pickering. His cousin Adeline later became a noted author. His parents and three sisters died in a yellow fever epidemic in New Orleans in 1833 when George was four. He was raised by strict Methodist grandparents in Boston. They hoped George would become a minister.

He attended common schools, where he acquired knowledge about different countries, got exposed to logical ways of thinking, and honed mechanical engineering skills using toy blocks and sticks. His best friend in school had immigrated from England, and related to Train how difficult it was to get around in his hometown, Birkenhead. This is what inspired Train to set up a tramway system in the same town. He did not go into the ministry, instead becoming a businessman and adventure seeker.

== Career ==
Train entered the mercantile business in Boston, and made it his career all his life in the United States, Britain and in Australia. He initiated numerous new businesses, building the corporate and financial structures to make them work.

=== Australia ===
He and his wife arrived in Melbourne on 23 May 1853 aboard the Bavaria, where he became the local agent for the White Diamond Line. In partnership with another American, former mariner Captain Ebenezer Caldwell, he imported clothing, building materials, guns, flour, patent medicines, mining tools, coaches and carts. Caldwell, Train & Co. built warehouses at either end of the newly constructed railway line from Sandridge to Flinders St, making it easier for White Star Line passengers to move their luggage between port and city. He was involved in the Melbourne Chamber of Commerce and he helped establish a volunteer fire brigade in the city.

Train's wife returned to Boston in 1854 to give birth to their daughter. He left Australia in November 1855 to join her, travelling via the Orient and the Middle East.

=== Britain ===
In 1860 he went to England to found horse tramway companies in Birkenhead and London, where he soon met opposition. He was also involved in the construction of a short-lived horse tramway in Cork, Ireland. Although his trams were popular with passengers, his designs had rails that stood above the road surface and obstructed other traffic. In 1861 Train was arrested and tried for "breaking and injuring" Uxbridge Road in London. He tried again with the Staffordshire Potteries Street Railway Company in 1861 and then with the Darlington Street Railroad Company in 1862, but the latter was short-lived, closing in 1865.

=== United States ===
Train was involved in the formation of the Union Pacific Railroad (UP) in 1864 during the American Civil War. The federal government chartered the railroad for construction of the portion of the Transcontinental Railroad west of the Missouri River. Train helped set up the shadow finance company for the project, the Credit Mobilier of America, whose principal officers were the same as those of UP. (See below)

That year, he left the United States for England. Referring to himself as "Citizen Train", Train became a shipping magnate, a prolific writer, a minor presidential candidate after return to the United States, and a confidant of French and Australian revolutionaries. He claimed to have been offered the presidency of a proposed Australian republic, but declined. During the American Civil War, he gave numerous speeches in England in favor of the Union and denounced the Confederacy.

On January 17, 1868, Train was arrested while aboard the RMS Scotia in the port of Queenstown (now Cobh) in Ireland, and held in custody. He had in his possession speeches he had given in the United States in defense of the Fenian cause of Irish independence. These documents were seized by a local magistrate. His release four days later was on condition that he disavow any intention of promoting Fenianism while in Ireland or England.

In the middle of his campaign for president in 1870, Train decided to make a trip around the globe, which was covered by many newspapers. Train delivered his last lecture in New York at the Bowery Theatre on July 10, 1870, then traveled overland by rail to San Francisco, giving lectures along the way. In San Francisco, he announced that he intended to carry out a "ninety day trip round the world", expecting to spend 82 days traveling. He sailed on the clipper Great Republic on August 1, expecting to return to the United States in November. The clipper brought him to Yokohama on August 26, and after that point he was often out of contact with the world's growing telegraphic network. He intended from the beginning to travel through the battlefields of the ongoing Franco-Prussian War, but when he telegraphed from Marseille on October 22, he found the city consumed by a communalist insurrection as well as the war. Train paused his travels to support the Communards, and when the insurrection was crushed, he was arrested in Lyon. Through the intervention of the U.S. government and Alexandre Dumas, he was released after 13 days. Train returned to New York on December 21, 164 days after his departure, but he claimed that he had circled the globe in 80 days because that was the amount of time he had spent traveling. His exploits possibly inspired Jules Verne's novel Around the World in Eighty Days; the protagonist Phileas Fogg is believed to have been partially modeled on Train.

While in Europe after his 1870 trip, Train met with the Grand Duke Constantine of Russia. During that period, he persuaded the Queen of Spain to back construction of a railway in the backwoods of Pennsylvania. Her support provided funding for the Atlantic and Great Western Railroad. He promoted and built tramways in Britain after opposition which he overcame by agreeing to run the rails level with the streets.

On his return to the U.S., Train's popularity and reputation soared. He began promoting the Union Pacific Railroad, with which he had been involved for several years, despite the advice of Cornelius Vanderbilt, who told him it would never work. Forming a finance company called Credit Foncier of America, Train made a fortune from real estate when the transcontinental railway opened up for colonization huge swaths of western America, including large amounts of land in Council Bluffs, Iowa; Omaha, Nebraska; and Columbus, Nebraska. He was responsible for building the Cozzens Hotel and founding Train Town in Omaha.

Train was noted for his involvement in the creation the Credit Mobilier in 1864, started to finance the Union Pacific. While appearing to be a separate, independent company which Union Pacific hired, Crédit Mobilier was staffed by the same officers as the railroad. Train and others created a structure that allowed them to realize outsize profits during the railroad's construction. The story about this scam and congressional graft was broken in 1872 by The Sun, a New York newspaper opposed to the re-election of Ulysses S. Grant for president. Eventually the scandals resulted in congressional and executive federal investigations which implicated numerous congressmen, including James Garfield. Denying the charges, Grant was re-elected as president.

In 1872, Train ran for president of the United States as an independent candidate. He was a supporter of the temperance movement. That year, he was jailed on obscenity charges while defending Victoria Woodhull for her newspaper's reporting of the alleged adulterous affair of abolitionist Henry Ward Beecher and Elizabeth Tilton. He was the primary financier of the newspaper The Revolution, which was dedicated to women's rights and published by Susan B. Anthony and Elizabeth Cady Stanton.

== Later years ==
As he aged, Train seemingly became more eccentric. In 1873, he was arrested and threatened with institutionalization in an insane asylum.

He stood for the position of dictator of the United States, charged admission fees to campaign rallies, and drew record crowds. He became a vegetarian and adopted various fads. Instead of shaking hands with other people, he shook hands with himself, a manner of greeting he claimed to have seen in China. He spent his final days on park benches in New York City's Madison Square Park, handing out dimes and refusing to speak to anyone but children and animals.

In 1890, Nellie Bly traveled around the world in 72 days, instigating Train to do a second circumnavigation of the earth in the same year. He completed the trip from Tacoma, Washington, and back in 67 days 12 hours and 1 minute, a world record at the time. A plaque in Tacoma commemorates the location where the 1890 trip began and ended. Train was accompanied on many of his travels by George Pickering Bemis, his cousin and private secretary. Bemis was later elected as mayor of Omaha, Nebraska.

In 1892, the town of Whatcom, Washington, offered to finance yet another trip around the world in order to publicize itself. Train finished this trip in a record 60 days.

He became ill with smallpox while visiting his daughter Susan M. Train Gulager in Stamford, Connecticut, in 1903.

On January 5, 1904, Train died of heart failure in New York. At the time of his death, he was living in a cheap lodging house named the Mills Hotel. He was buried at a small private ceremony at Green-Wood Cemetery in Brooklyn. After his death, The Thirteen Club, of which he was a member, passed a resolution that he was one of the few sane men in "a mad, mad world."

== Marriage and family ==
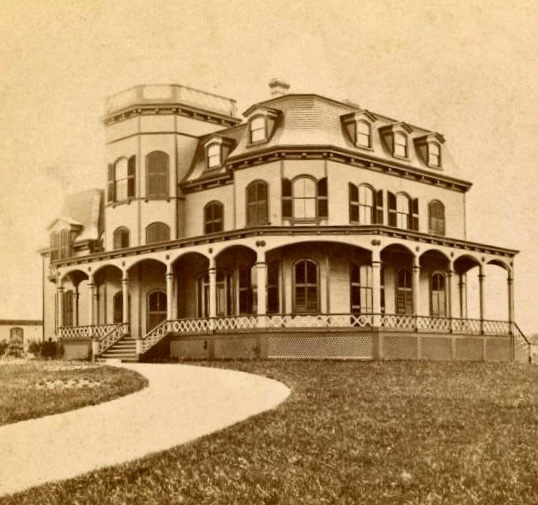
Train's summer cottage in Newport, Rhode Island

Train married Wilhelmina Wilkinson Davis in 1851, with whom he had four children, including daughter Susan M. Train Gulager.

In 1869, Train erected a large Italianate summer cottage in Newport, Rhode Island. Known as Train Villa, it stood at Bellevue Avenue at Bailey's Beach. After Train's death, it was renamed Beachholm. It was destroyed by fire in the 1970s.

== Publications ==
- An American Merchant in Europe, Asia, and Australia (1851)
- Young America Abroad (1857)
- Young America in Wall Street (1858)
- Irish Independency (1865)
- Championship of Women (1868)
- My Life in Many States and in Foreign Lands (1902)

"The story of a remarkable and adventurous life. Mr. Train was at one time one of the best known Americans on the face of the globe. He organized the clipper ship line that sailed around Cape Horn to San Francisco; he organized the Credit Mobilier and the Union Pacific Railroad; he was one of the organizers of the French Commune; he built the first street-railway in England; he has been the business partner of queens, emperors, and grand dukes, and the familiar friend of some of the greatest people in the world. His story up to the present is one long romance."

— Publishers Weekly, Weekly Record of Publications (1902)

== See also ==
- Tramways Act 1870
