= Nebraska Methodist College =

Private health college in Omaha, Nebraska, US

Coordinates: 41°15′50″N 96°02′54″W

Nebraska Methodist College of Nursing and Allied Health
- Type: Private, non-profit
- Established: 1891
- Religious affiliation: United Methodist Church
- Students: 775 undergraduates, 327 graduates
- Location: Omaha, Nebraska, United States
- Campus: Urban
- Website: methodistcollege.edu

Nebraska Methodist College of Nursing and Allied Health is a private Methodist college in Omaha, Nebraska that focuses on degrees in healthcare.

== Academics ==
Nebraska Methodist College offers associate's, bachelor's, master's and doctoral degrees in nursing and allied health professions.

The institution offers two online Doctor of Education degrees in Education and Leadership in Healthcare and Public Health Policy. Both degree programs require the completion of a doctoral project in lieu of a traditional dissertation.

== Accreditation ==
Nebraska Methodist College is accredited by the Higher Learning Commission of the North Central Association of Colleges and Schools. Some of the school's programs are accredited through the Commission on Accreditation of Allied Health Education Programs, the American Association of Medical Assistants and the American Registry of Radiologic Technologists.

Graduates are eligible to take the National Council of State Boards Licensure Examinations.
