= Presbyterian Theological Seminary (Omaha, Nebraska) =

Coordinates: 41.2888°N 95.9437°W

Omaha Presbyterian Theological Seminary
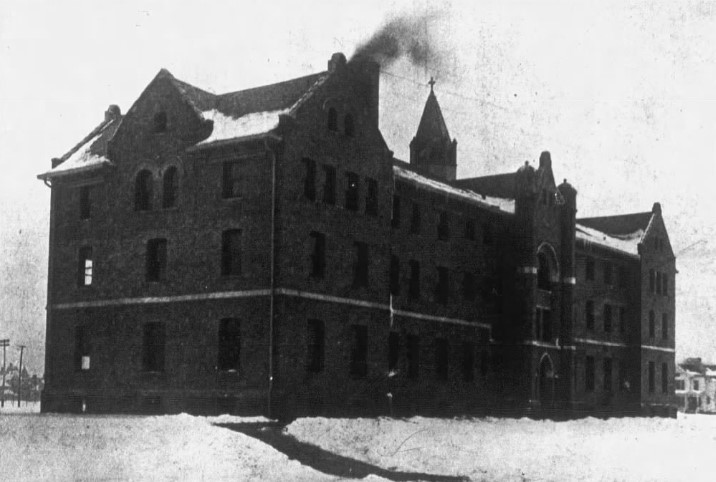
- Photograph of the seminary at Kountze Place, c. 1903
- Interactive map of the Omaha Presbyterian Theological Seminary area

General information
- Location: 3303 North 21st Place, North Omaha, Nebraska, United States
- Construction started: 1901
- Completed: 1902
- Demolished: 1979 building razed by fire
- Seminary closed in 1943

The Omaha Presbyterian Theological Seminary was located at 3303 North 21st Place in North Omaha, Nebraska, United States. Opened in 1891 in downtown Omaha, the institution moved to the Kountze Place neighborhood in North Omaha in 1902 and closed in 1943. Converted to apartments, the building stood until 1979 when a fire destroyed it.

== History ==
On February 17, 1891, a group of Presbyterian pastors and lay leaders gathered to establish a Presbyterian Seminary in Omaha. They felt a need for educated clergy to serve small, rural communities in the Midwestern United States. Enrolling its first students in September 1891, from 1895 to 1902 the seminary was located in the former Cozzens House Hotel at 9th and Harney Streets in Downtown Omaha. It was replaced in 1902 when a new facility was built in the Kountze Place suburb of North Omaha. The building was demolished later that year.

In 1901 the seminary purchased 5 acres (20,000 m^{2}) in Kountze Place for $20,000. Within a year a building was completed that included dormitory rooms, classrooms, offices, a library and a chapel, as well as a dining room, janitor's quarters and other rooms. It was a three-story-tall gray stone building with high basement windows and a bell tower above the middle section. In 1903, funds from Judge Charles E. Vanderburgh's estate were bequeathed to the seminary to support the construction of the president's home on campus. Mary Sibbet Copley was the primary philanthropist supporting the seminary. After her initial contribution of the Cozzens Hotel in downtown Omaha in 1902, she made regular donations, practically underwriting the institution. In 1929, she left a bequest of $150,000 to the seminary.

In 1909 the University of Omaha was established a few blocks north of the seminary and most of the teachers were recruited from seminary faculty. Three of the university's first four presidents were ordained Presbyterian ministers.

In 1943 the general assembly of the United States Presbyterian Church voted to close the seminary after it failed to meet the minimum accreditation standards of the American Association of Theological Schools. More than 1,000 graduates served in the Midwest, other states and around the world.

The seminary's governing board continued to exist for several decades after its closure, and today operates as the Omaha Presbyterian Seminary Foundation. After turning the building into an apartment house they became committed to raising funds to support theology students attending schools around the world.

After it was a seminary, the building became a privately owned apartment building, and then a federally-subsidized apartment building. A fire destroyed the structure in 1979, and as of 2022 the lot sits empty.

== Notable alumni ==
- Colvin G. Butler, Presbyterian pastor, farmer, and Minnesota state legislator
- Frederick Wedge, Presbyterian pastor, evangelist and educator, who had boxed professionally as "Kid" Wedge
- Robert G. Rayburn, Presbyterian pastor, first president of Covenant Theological Seminary, and first president of Covenant College

== See also ==
- History of North Omaha, Nebraska
- List of colleges and universities in Omaha, Nebraska
- Education in Omaha, Nebraska
