= Train Town =

Neighborhood in Omaha, Nebraska, U.S.

Coordinates: 41.242°N 95.930°W

Train Town, today called the Credit Foncier Addition, was a suburb of Omaha, Nebraska owned by noted eccentric Union Pacific promoter George Francis Train's company called Credit Foncier of America. The area was 20 blocks by 20 blocks, which was approximately the size of Omaha at the time. It was located from Pierce Street southward to what is now the path of I-80, and from the Missouri River on the west to 20th Street.

== History ==
Train bought the tract of land on what was then the southern edge of Omaha, and frequently claimed to own 5,000 acres (20 km^{2}) in the city. He eventually brought in prefabricated cottages to help ease the housing shortage in the city. Train bought the area on the speculation that citizens would want to live near the old Union Pacific depot and the Union Pacific Missouri River Bridge, which was built next to the neighborhood at Train's insistence. There was a public elementary school located at Sixth and Hickory Streets in the community that was named for Train, called "Train Elementary School".

According to journalist and African explorer Henry Morton Stanley, Train made "a small fortune" by selling lots in Train Town. The remaining land was repossessed by creditors in the early 1870s, and today it is located immediately south of Downtown Omaha. The tract is still referred to as the "Credit Foncier Addition." Credit Foncier was Train's company that platted the land in 1867. It still contains a number of original cottages, especially along Woolworth Avenue.

== See also ==
- History of Omaha
- List of neighborhoods in Omaha, Nebraska
