= Kountze Place =

Neighborhood of Omaha, Nebraska, U.S.

Coordinates: 41°17′21″N 95°56′49″W

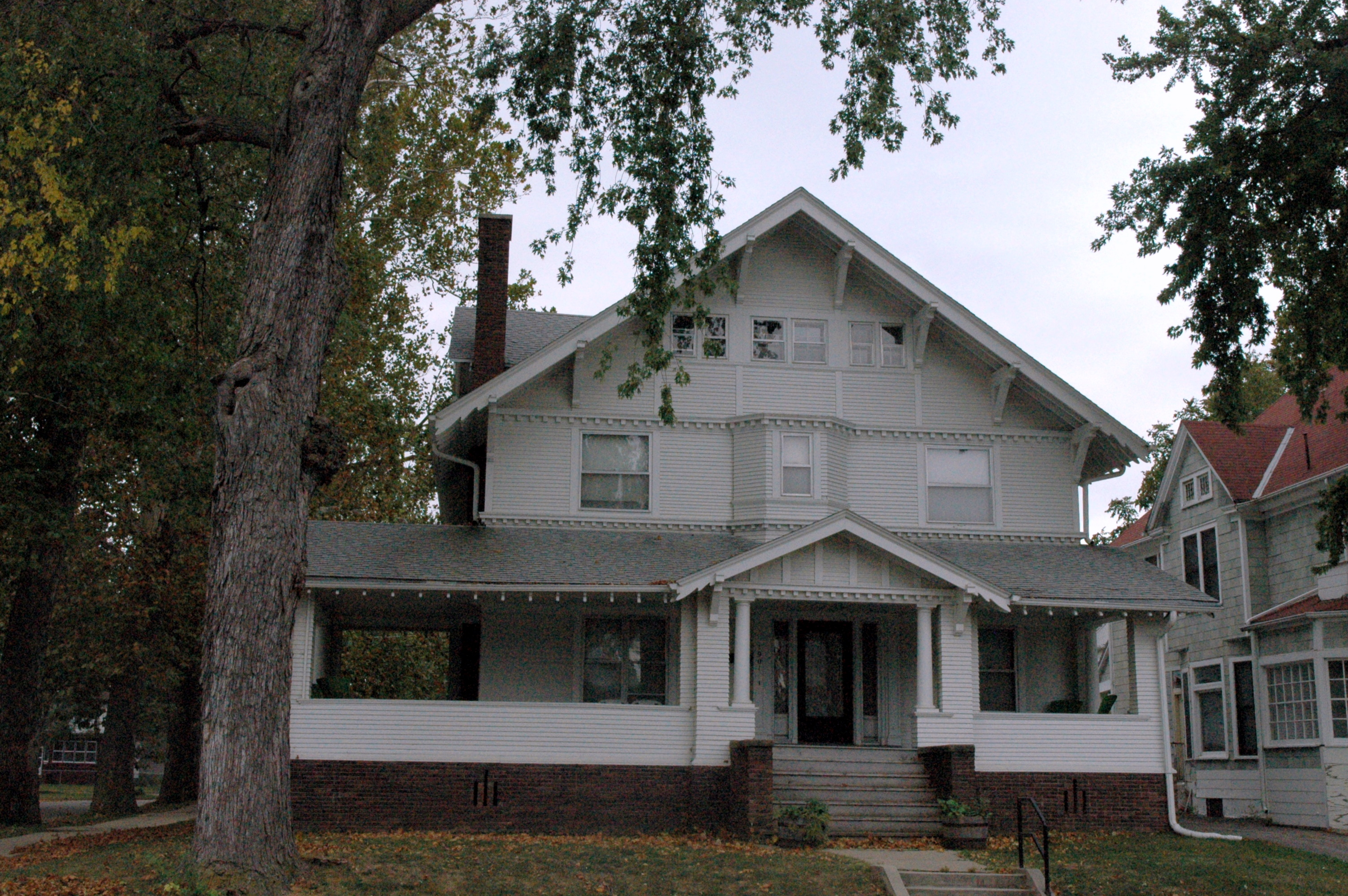
The Charles Storz House

The Kountze Place neighborhood of Omaha, Nebraska is a historically significant community on the city's north end. Today the neighborhood is home to several buildings and homes listed on the National Register of Historic Places. It is located between North 16th Avenue on the east to North 30th Street on the west; Locust Street on the south to Pratt Street on the north. Kountze Place was annexed into Omaha in 1887. The neighborhood was built as a suburban middle and upper middle class enclave for doctors, lawyers, successful businessmen and other professional workers.

== About ==
Bordered by the historic neighborhoods of the Near North Side, Saratoga and East Omaha, Kountze Place was an early upper middle class residential suburb developed by Omaha banker Herman Kountze in 1883. It was originally accessible only via streetcar.

In 1898 Kountze Place was home to the Trans-Mississippi Exposition, a showcase for Nebraska's agricultural and Omaha's urban lifestyles. In 1899 some of the land that the Expo occupied was developed into Kountze Park. The area around the park was filled in with housing afterwards, with some Exposition buildings being converted into grand houses.

A March 1907 Omaha Sunday Bee advertisement promotes Kountze Place:

Make your home in Koutnze Place. Where you will find more homes of Omaha's best business men than in any other addition in the city. This alone is one of the best reasons why you should live in this beautiful addition. Paved streets, permanent walks, water, sewer and gas. No hills, no hollows, good schools, churches, shaded streets, good neighborhood. Within 10 or 15 minutes' drive or street car ride of the retail and wholesale district, reached by 3 car lines, the Dodge, North 24th and Sherman Ave. The Florence Boulevard runs through the center of the Addition and the prices only about one‐half what they are asking for no better lots in the Western or Southwestern part of the City.

Some of Kountze Place was affected by the Easter Sunday Tornado of 1913, with landmarks such as Trinity Methodist Church to be rebuilt in other parts of the city. Additionally around this time, many of Kountze Place's richer residents were lured to areas such as Bemis Park and Gold Coast with promises of higher land values.

== Landmarks ==
Several buildings and homes in Kountze Place are listed on the National Register of Historic Places and designated as Omaha Landmarks by the City of Omaha. Former landmarks in the area included the Presbyterian Theological Seminary, built in 1902 at 3303 North 21st Place. It was closed in 1943.

Name	Year	Location	Notes
Sacred Heart Church	1902	2206 Binney Street	
John E. Reagan House	1908	2102 Pinkney Street	Designed in the Neo‐Classical Revival style.
John P. Bay House	1887	2024 Binney Street	
Charles Storz House	1909	1901 Wirt Street	
George H. Kelly House	1904	1924 Binney Street	
Kountze Park	1899	1920 Pinkney Street	Site of the Trans-Mississippi Exposition
George F. Shepard House	1903	1802 Wirt Street	Designated an Omaha Landmark in 1981.
Lothrop School		3300 North 22nd Street	
Omaha Presbyterian Theological Seminary	1891	3303 North 21st Place	Closed in 1943.
Omaha Driving Park	1875	Laird and Boyd Streets, and 16th to 20th Streets	Closed by 1910 and divided into house lots.
Redick Mansion	1875	3612 North 24th Street	First home of UNO; moved in 1917.

== Omaha University ==
Omaha University, now called the University of Nebraska at Omaha, was once located on one city block at 24th and Pratt Streets on the Redick estate. Their proposed "magnificent campus" was slated to be placed between 21st and 25th Avenues, bounded by Kountze Park and the Carter Lake Park. Original faculty came from the aforementioned Seminary, as well as Bellevue College. The first class meetings occurred at the Redick Mansion at 24th and Pratt.

In 1927 businessmen formed the North Omaha Activities Association in order to redevelop Saratoga School's playing field into a football field for Omaha University's football team. At that time the university was located just south in the posh Kountze Place suburb. With new bleachers built to accommodate a crowd of a thousand, the Saratoga Field was home to OU's team until 1951.

UNO moved to its present location in 1929.

== See also ==
- History of North Omaha
