= Old Gold Coast =

Historic district in Omaha, Nebraska, U.S.

Coordinates: 41°14′44″N 95°55′46″W

Old Gold Coast is a historic district in south Omaha, Nebraska. With South 10th Street as the central artery, the area was home to neighborhoods such as Little Italy and Forest Hill. The area is referred to as "old" because it was replaced in prominence in the late 19th century when a new district usurped its importance. This area south of downtown was generally bounded by Leavenworth Street on the north, Bancroft Street on the south, the Missouri River on the east, and South 16th Street on the west.

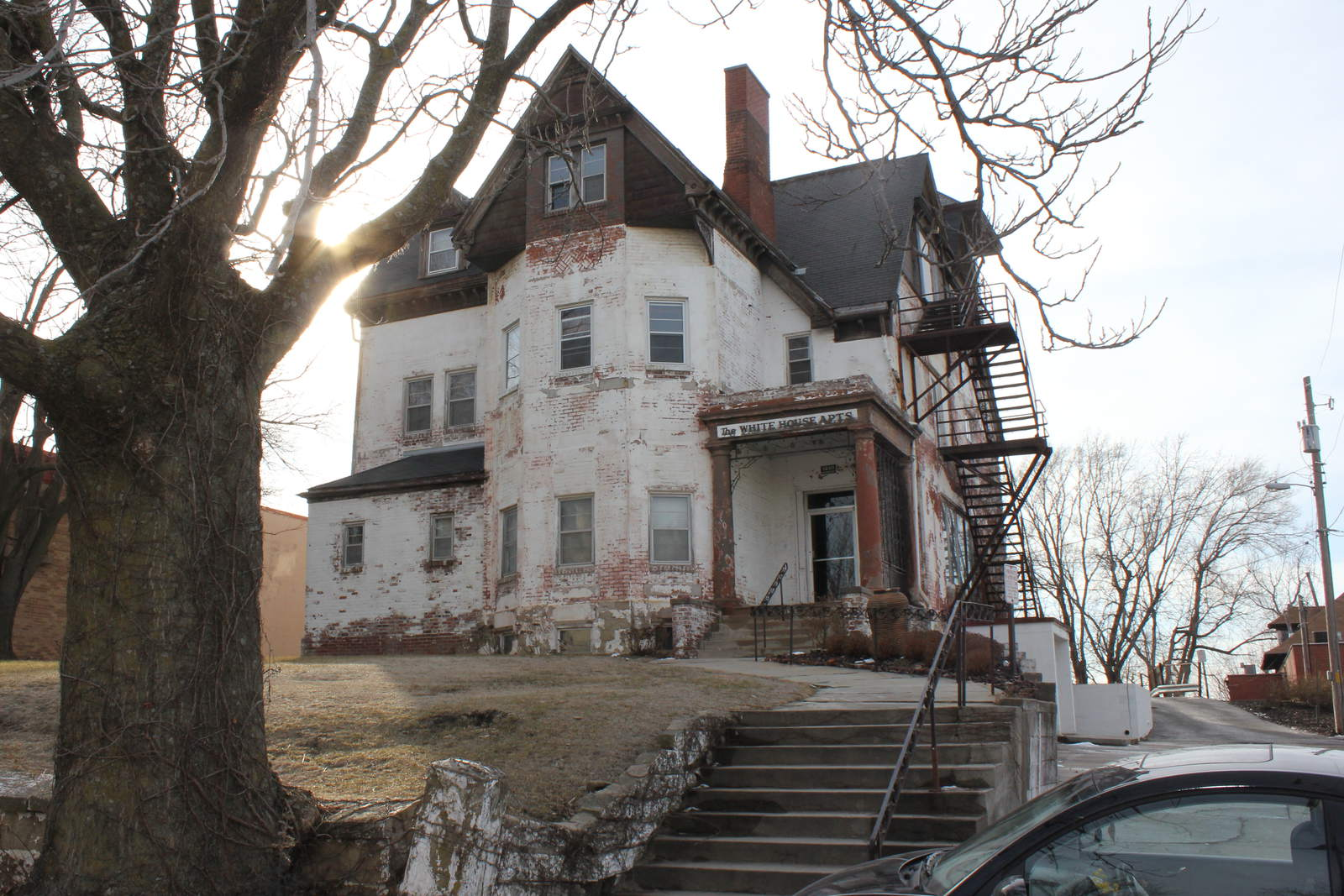
The Bishop George Worthington Residence at 1240 South 10th Street.

== History ==
Early in the city's history business owners built their homes close to their factories and businesses near downtown Omaha. Many of Omaha's most elite early settlers built mansions in this area. The hills along South 8th and South 10th Streets, from Mason Street to Riverview Park, was first recognized as the city's "Gold Coast" in the 1880s. The Omaha Horse and Railway Company allowed these business tycoons and others to commute from this suburban area to their downtown businesses.

== Notable buildings ==
There are many historically notable sites in the Old Gold Coast neighborhood today, with few remaining structures evidencing history. Located between Pacific and Hickory, from South 6th to South 13th, the Old Gold Coast has deep relevance in the establishment of Omaha. Because of that, several notable buildings were constructed there.

Some of the historically important sites in the neighborhood were established by the Kountze brothers. Founders of the First National Bank of Omaha in 1867, they also built several other banks from the Missouri River to the Rocky Mountains, including the Colorado National Bank in 1862. Each of the Kountze brothers was also a large landowner in the Missouri River Valley in Nebraska. Augustus, Charles and Herman all built large homes in the Old Gold Coast. Herman Kountze's estate was the largest landholding of the three in the neighborhood, capping a tall hill south of downtown Omaha along South 10th Street called Forest Hill. One of the fine homes demolished in the Old Gold Coast neighborhood is the Charles Kountze Mansion at 1234 South 10th Street, which was removed to make room for modern apartments in 2014.

Other era mansions in the Old Gold Coast included the Cornish Residence at 1404 South 10th Street was built in 1886 for Colonel Joel Cornish shortly after he moved to Omaha. Architect Thomas R. Kimball designed several homes in the area.

Several other notable buildings were affiliated with Bishop George Worthington, a wealthy and influential Episcopalian leader among Omaha pioneers. Several are still standing in the area include Dietz Memorial United Methodist Church, built as St. Matthias Episcopal Church in 1889. and the Bishop Worthington Residence at 1240 South 10th Street. Built in 1886, the Bishop Worthington Residence is large and has been used for several purposes. The Brownell Hall, which was an Episcopalian boarding school for girls, used to be located across the street from St. Matthias Episcopal Church, which served as its chapel. Worthington Hospital was housed in a wood-frame building on South 9th Street and Worthington Place in the 1890s.

After the Kountzes died and moved away, the St. Catherine's Hospital moved onto the former estate around 1900. Brownell Hall moved to west Omaha into a grand new building, and the Worthington Hospital was closed and demolished. After being founded in the Kountze Place neighborhood, Presbyterian Hospital was located in the former Bishop Worthington Residence from 1898 through the 1930s, and closed permanently after that. Grace University moved to the area in 1948 and slowly re-amassed the land once included in Kountze's Forest Hill estate. After acquiring St. Catherine's hospital at South 8th and Forest Avenue, the university expanded south across several blocks, almost to Hickory Street, and west from South 8th to South 10th Street. Those are the same dimensions as Kountze's original plat for the area. However, due to declining enrollment and financial difficulty, the university closed in 2018 and sold its assets. Much of the area is now being developed into Apartments and a public elementary school.

At the turn of the 20th century, the neighborhood in-filled quickly with smaller houses and more affordable options. Around that time, an influx of Italian immigrants moved into the area and earned the neighborhood a place in Omaha's Little Italy.

Today, large American foursquare style houses dot the blocks while shotgun houses fill in many lots. Since 2010, there has also been determined gentrification of the neighborhood, with many old homes demolished to make room for large, modern apartments and condominiums.

=== Notable sites ===
- (1886) Colonel Joel Cornish Mansion, 1404 South 10th Street
- (1890) W.R. Matthews House, 802 Worthington Place; designed by Thomas Rogers Kimball; demolished in the 1980s
- (1883) Brownell Hall, South 10th and Worthington Street; demolished in the 1960s. Included Worthington Hall, Brownell Hall, Bartell Hall and Willard Hall.
- (1883) Dietze Memorial United Methodist Church / St. Matthias Episcopal Church, 1423 South 10th Street
- (circa 1899) St. Catherine's Hospital, 811 South 8th Street; rebuilt or added onto in 1920; 1941; (Grace University) 1962; 1991; 2010; 2016
- (1880) Thomas Rogers Kimball House, 1335 South 10th Street; demolished 1950s
- (1880s) Worthington Hospital, South 10th and Pierce Streets; demolished circa 1910
- (1892) R.S. Deems House, 810 Worthington Place
- (1893) W.R. Matthews House, 802 Worthington Avenue; demolished circa 1990
- (c. 1890s) John and Lora Power House, 1913 South 10th Street
- (1892) Barker Mansion, 1505 South 8th Street; demolished in 1965
- (1892) Metz Mansion
- (1893) Drexel Mansion, 1244 South 10th; eventually part of Presbyterian Hospital; demolished circa 1965
- (1894) Charles Kountze Mansion, 1234 South 10th; Originally built for C. Kountze, this home was later owned by architect John F. Coots; H. F. Dailey; socialite Anna Metcalf; was part of Presbyterian Hospital; and then Johnston and Son and Miller-Salanitro Funeral Home; demolished 2014;
- (1885) Bishop Worthington Residence; 1240 South 10th Street; later was part of Presbyterian Hospital and then the White House Apartments
- (1887) Peter Ihler Mansion, 1248 South 1Oth Street; later part of Presbyterian Hospital; jthe Christ Child Center; Demolished circa 1965
- (c. 1889) Louis and Mark Schroeder Mansion, 1608 South 10th Street; demolished 1965
- (1905) Charles Dougherty Residence, 1215 South 10th Street

== See also ==
- Gold Coast Historic District - Omaha's second Gold Coast neighborhood
