= South 10th Street =

Street in Omaha, Nebraska, United States

- North end: Cuming Street; 41°16′06″N 95°55′48″W
- South end: Hugo Street; 41°13′13″N 95°55′46″W

South 10th Street is a two-way street that runs south-north from Downtown into South Omaha, Nebraska. Beginning at Dodge Street, South 10th Street passes Gene Leahy Mall and borders the ConAgra Campus and the Old Market. Its southern reaches are widely regarded as the heart of Little Italy, and further south it was the center of the Old Gold Coast neighborhood. There were several other historically ethnic communities, as well.

== Background ==
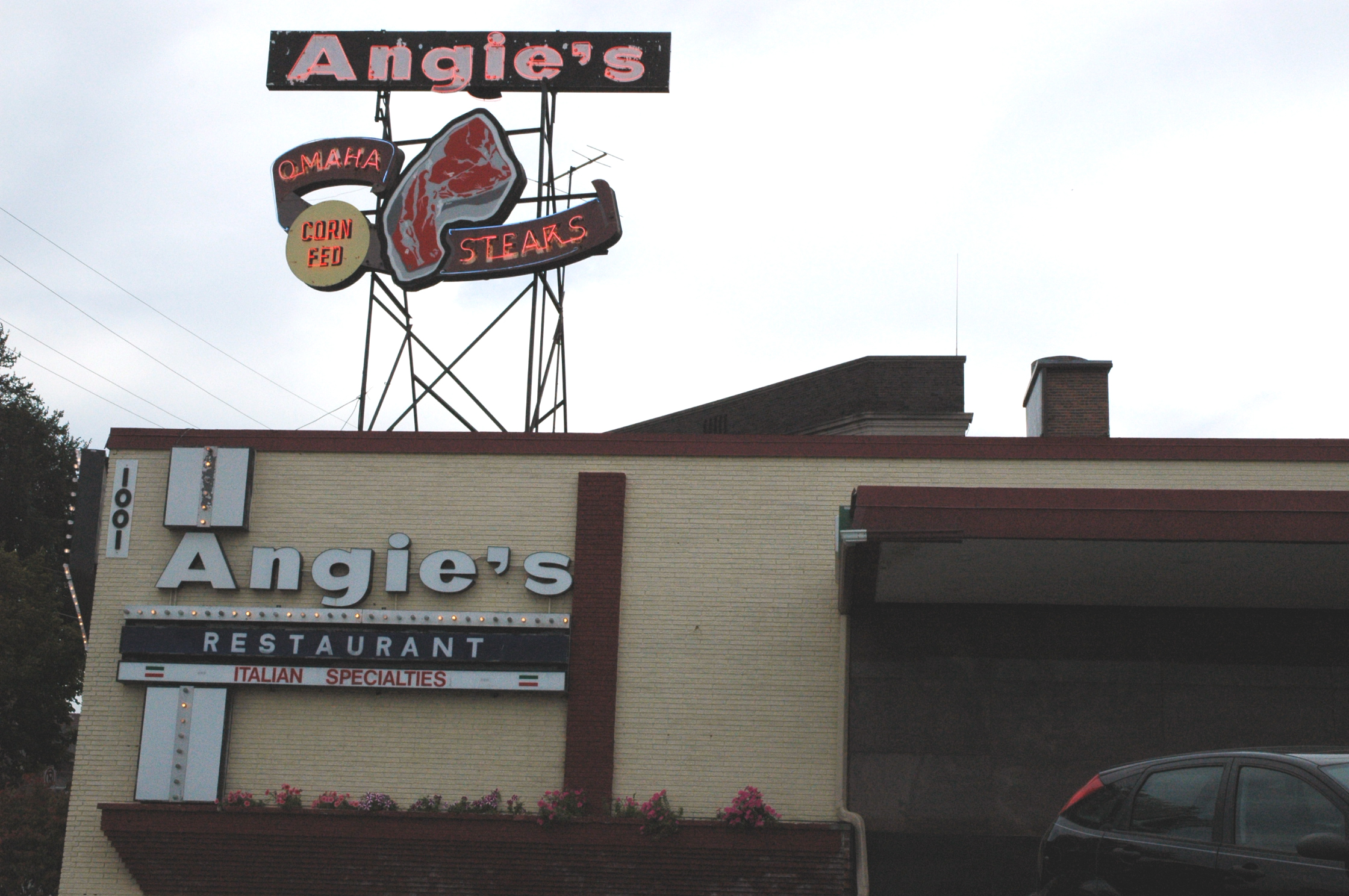
Angie's Restaurant

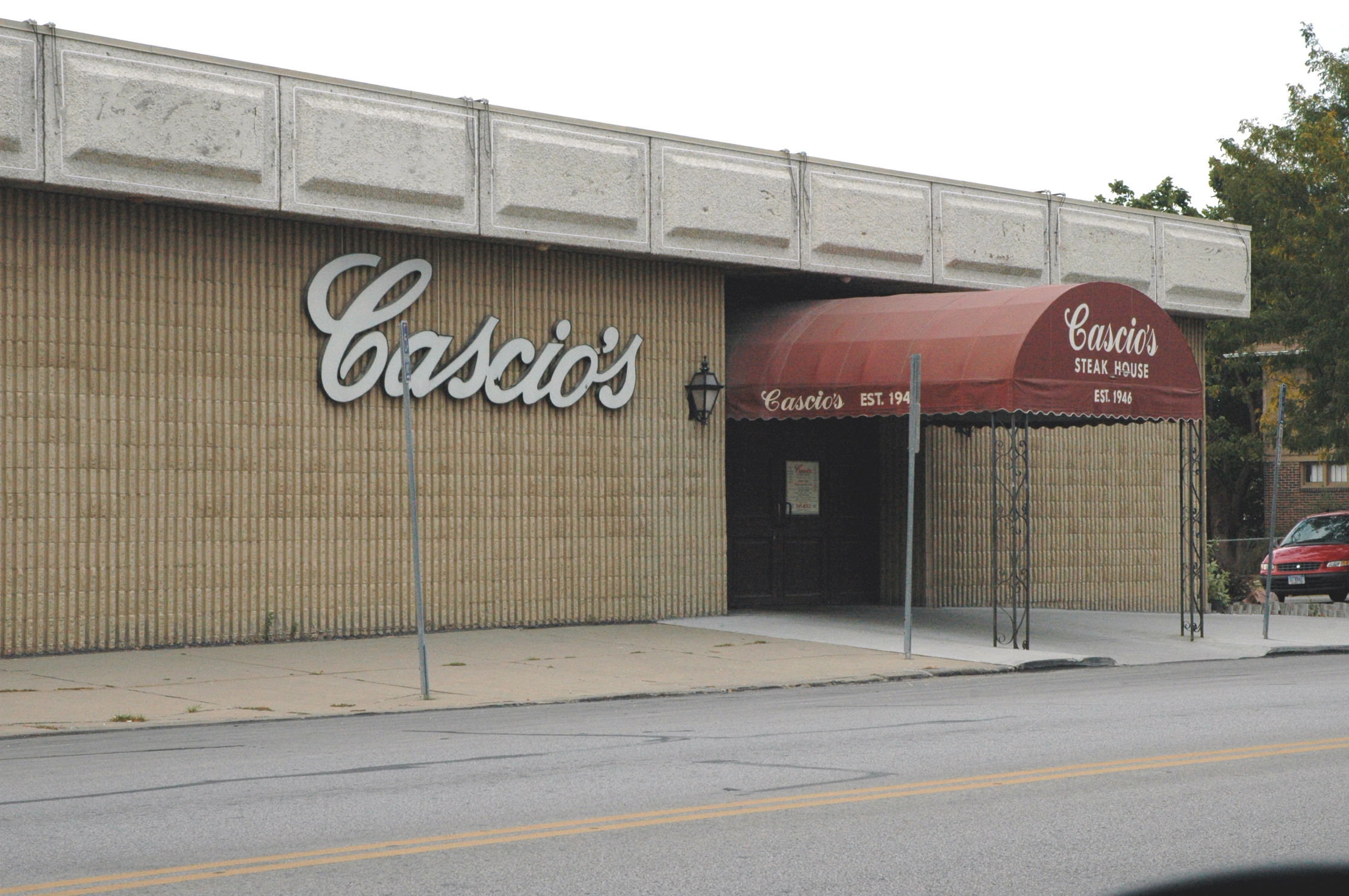
Cascio's Restaurant

Italian immigrants settled in the neighborhood in the late 1800s, quickly earning the nickname "Little Italy". Today it is home to Latinos, Europeans and other people. However, there are still several Italian restaurants and bakeries along the strip, including the notable Cascio's Steak House and Angie's Restaurant. Angie's Restaurant closed in 2007, and was replaced by Lucky's Lounge, which promptly closed also.

South 10th Street and the area around it have been a business corridor for many years. Located within downtown, the eastern border of the Old Market is South 10th. Further south, Lauritzen Gardens is bordered by the street, as well. The Sons of Italy Hall at 1238 South 10th Street is a longstanding cultural institution, and the Durham Western Heritage Museum and the Henry Doorly Zoo are equally significant. The Bancroft Street Farmers Market is also located along South 10th.

=== Historical places ===
As the home of Old Gold Coast, South 10th has many sites and a few buildings that were central to the early growth of Omaha in the pioneer era and immediately afterwards. As the neighborhood developed, it lost its luster but gained working-class roots.

Omaha's pioneer elite and first generation of successful businessmen built many large homes along South 10th Street. The first was Herman Kountze, who built a fortune in banking in Omaha and Denver. Building a mansion at his estate called Forest Hill, Kountze established the area as Omaha's first Gold Coast and many other wealthy people followed suit. His brother Charles Kountze also had a large mansion in the neighborhood, and another brother, Augustus Kountze, lived there, too. All were wealthy bankers, and built grand mansions fitting their owners' largess. None of the Kountze Brothers' mansions remain standing.

After the Kountzes moved away, the St. Catherine's Hospital moved into the former estate. Much of the area was influenced by Bishop George Worthington, an Episcopal-era leader in Omaha. The Episcopalian Brownell-Talbot School was located in the Old Gold Coast, and Dietz Memorial United Methodist Church, which was originally St. Matthias Episcopal church. Worthington Street in the neighborhood was named for him, as was the former Worthington Hospital. His personal mansion, the Bishop Worthington Residence at 1240 South 10th, is currently under consideration for historically accurate restoration and preservation.

One fine home in the Old Gold Coast that still stands is the Joel N. Cornish House. Colonel Cornish was a wealthy retired military officer who brought his wealth to Omaha. Today, the home is designated as an Omaha Landmark and is listed on the National Register of Historic Places. It is located at 1404 South 10th Street.

Other NRHP listings along South 10th include Burlington Station, Hospe Music Warehouse, Union Station, Dietz Memorial United Methodist Church, the Neble House, St. Matthias' Episcopal Church and St. Philomena's Cathedral and Rectory. The Parlin, Orendorff and Martin Plow Company Building, part of the Omaha Rail and Commerce Historic District, is on South 10th, as well.
