= Bishop Worthington Residence =

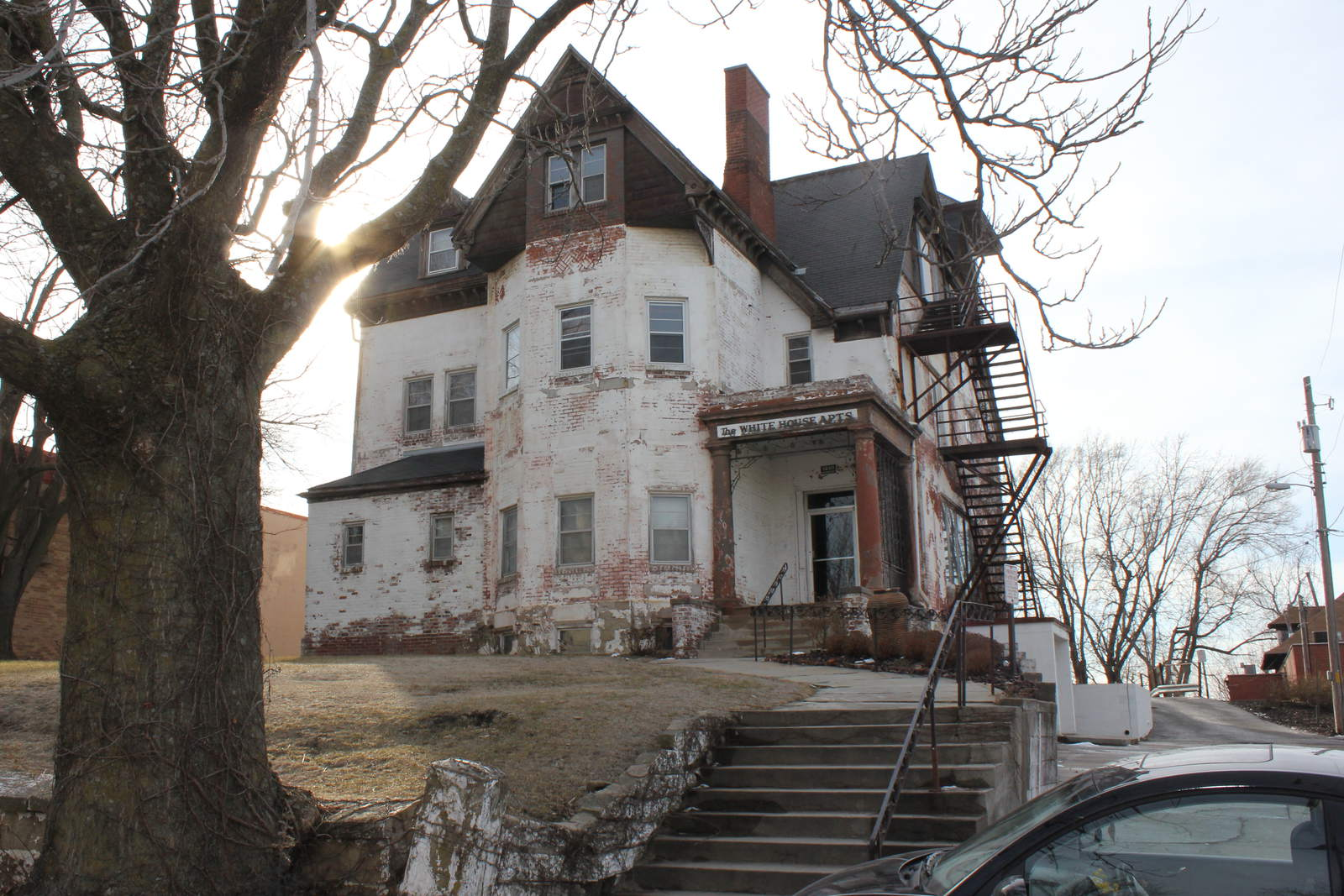
- Bishop Worthington Residence, a.k.a. Presbyterian Hospital, Lutheran Home for the Aged, and White House Apartments
- Interactive map of the Bishop Worthington Residence area

General information
- Architectural style: Queen Anne
- Location: Omaha, Nebraska, United States
- Coordinates: 41.2461°N 95.9299°W
- Construction started: 1884
- Completed: 1885
- Client: George Worthington

Design and construction
- Architect: Gordon W. Lloyd,

The Bishop Worthington Residence was built at 1240 South 10th Street in Omaha, Nebraska in 1885. The personal home of Bishop George Worthington of the Episcopal Church, the Worthington Mansion was a place of high social and religious importance during the pioneer era of Omaha history. During its history, the mansion also served as the second Presbyterian Hospital and as the White House Apartments.

== Design ==
The location of the Worthington Mansion reflected his great wealth on arrival to Omaha. The banking family of brothers Herman and Augustus Kountze established an exclusive neighborhood for wealthy people on South 10th Street, due south of downtown Omaha, in the early 1880s. Herman Kountze's estate was called Forest Hill, and was renowned for one of the most commanding views of Omaha. Bishop Worthington had his mansion constructed adjacent to Brownell Hall, an Episcopalian girls boarding school, and its accompanying chapel, St. Matthias Episcopal Church.

Gordon W. Lloyd, an English-trained architect who worked in Detroit, was the architect of the Worthington Mansion. Lloyd was noted as a designer of Episcopal churches and related buildings, and was from Worthington's former diocese in Michigan. Designed in the high Queen Anne style, the home has retained many of its original interior features. They include 26 rooms, a grand staircase, large parlor, separate devotional room, a large library and den, as well as many bedrooms. Originally, the arms of the local Episcopalian diocese were cut into the glass on the front doors, which also had the personal arms of Bishop Worthington on the inner doors of the vestibule.

Soon after its construction, Bishop Worthington's sister and brother moved from Ohio and New York to join him living in his mansion. The three were all unmarried at first, with Bishop Worthington marrying later in life. Bishop Worthington is attributed with serving in Omaha until 1899; however, an obituary in The New York Times states he left Nebraska in 1890.

Worthington's mansion was quickly surrounded by other mansions, including the 1893 Drexel Mansion at 1244 South 10th; the 1894 Charles Kountze Mansion at 1234 South 10th; and the 1887 Peter Ihler Mansion at 1248 South 10th Street. During this early era the Worthington Hospital, named in honor of the Bishop, was built nearby at South 10th and Pierce Streets, too.

== After Worthington ==
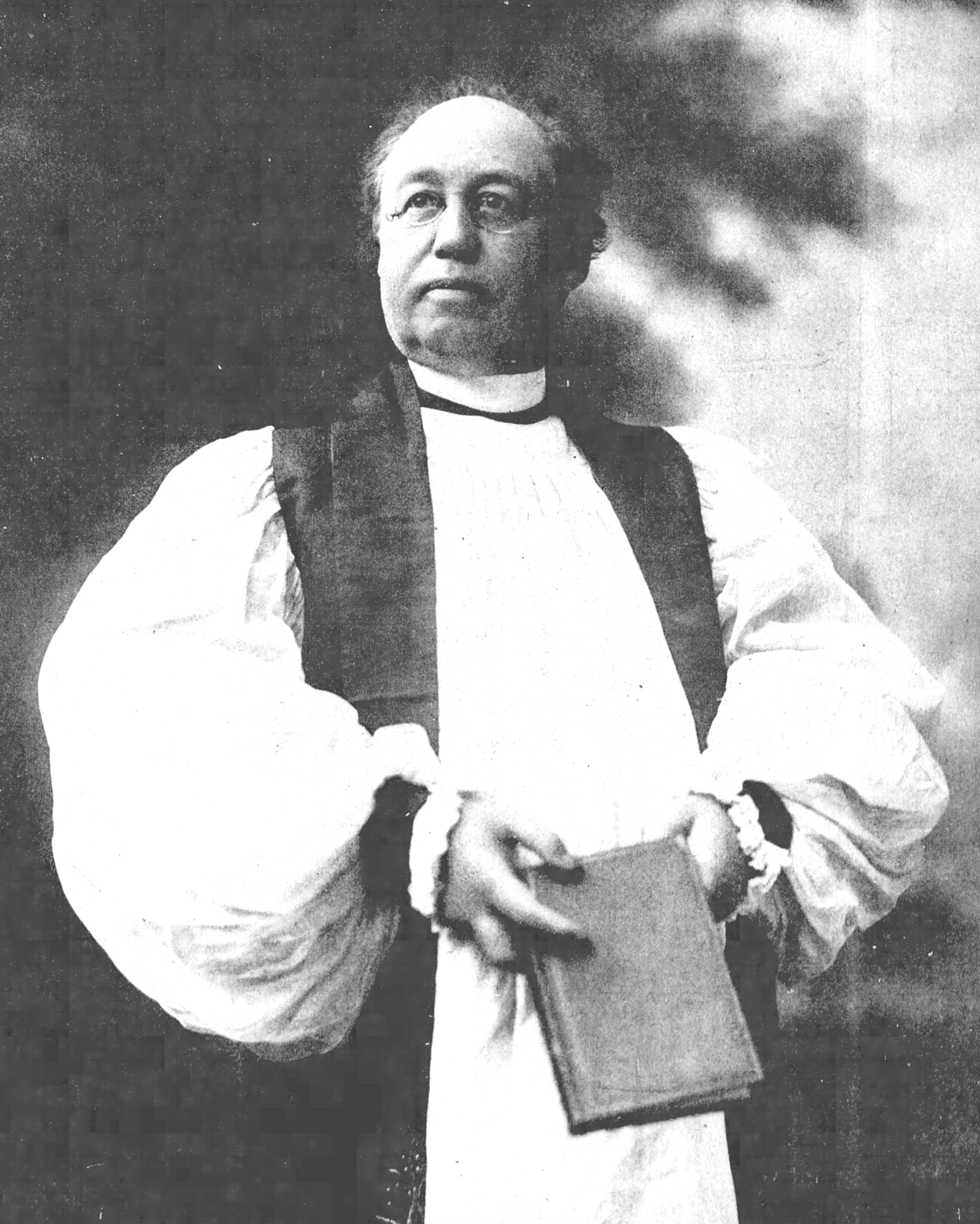
A picture of Bishop George Worthington, c. 1899.

In the early 1900s, the Worthington Mansion became home to the Presbyterian Hospital. It was one of several mansions that were acquired by for the hospital. However, by the 1930s the hospital had moved out and the building became home to the Lutheran Home for the Aged. By the 1950s, the home was separated into rental units and called The White House Apartments. During this era, the Order of the Sons of Italy moved into 1238 South 10th Street, which was the original carriage house for the mansion. It has been demolished since then.

The neighborhood surrounding the Worthington Mansion has changed dramatically, too. The last of the mansions that once surrounded Bishop Worthington's residence was the Charles Storz home, and it was demolished in 2014. Grace University has bought many of the other regal homes that once filled the blocks and has been demolishing them, too. A local historic preservation organization called Restoration Exchange Omaha has expressed interest in saving the Worthington Mansion from further deterioration, in 2016 began fundraising to contribution to its historically accurate restoration and further preservation efforts.

== See also ==
- History of Omaha, Nebraska
- South 10th Street
- Old Gold Coast
