= Landmarks in Curitiba =

Curitiba, Paraná, Brazil has a variety of landmarks.

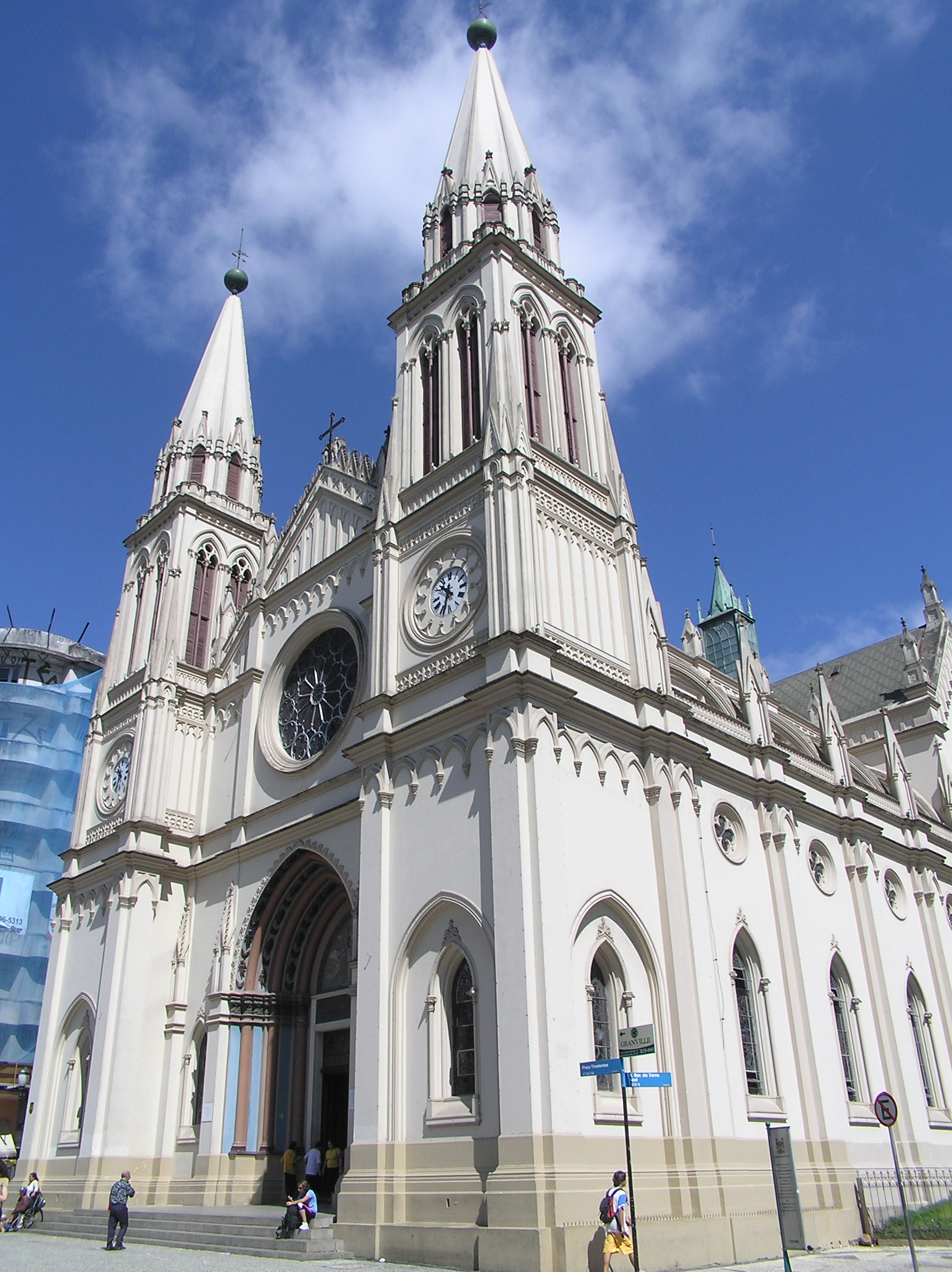
Metropolitan Cathedral.

== Parks ==
=== Botanical Gardens. ===
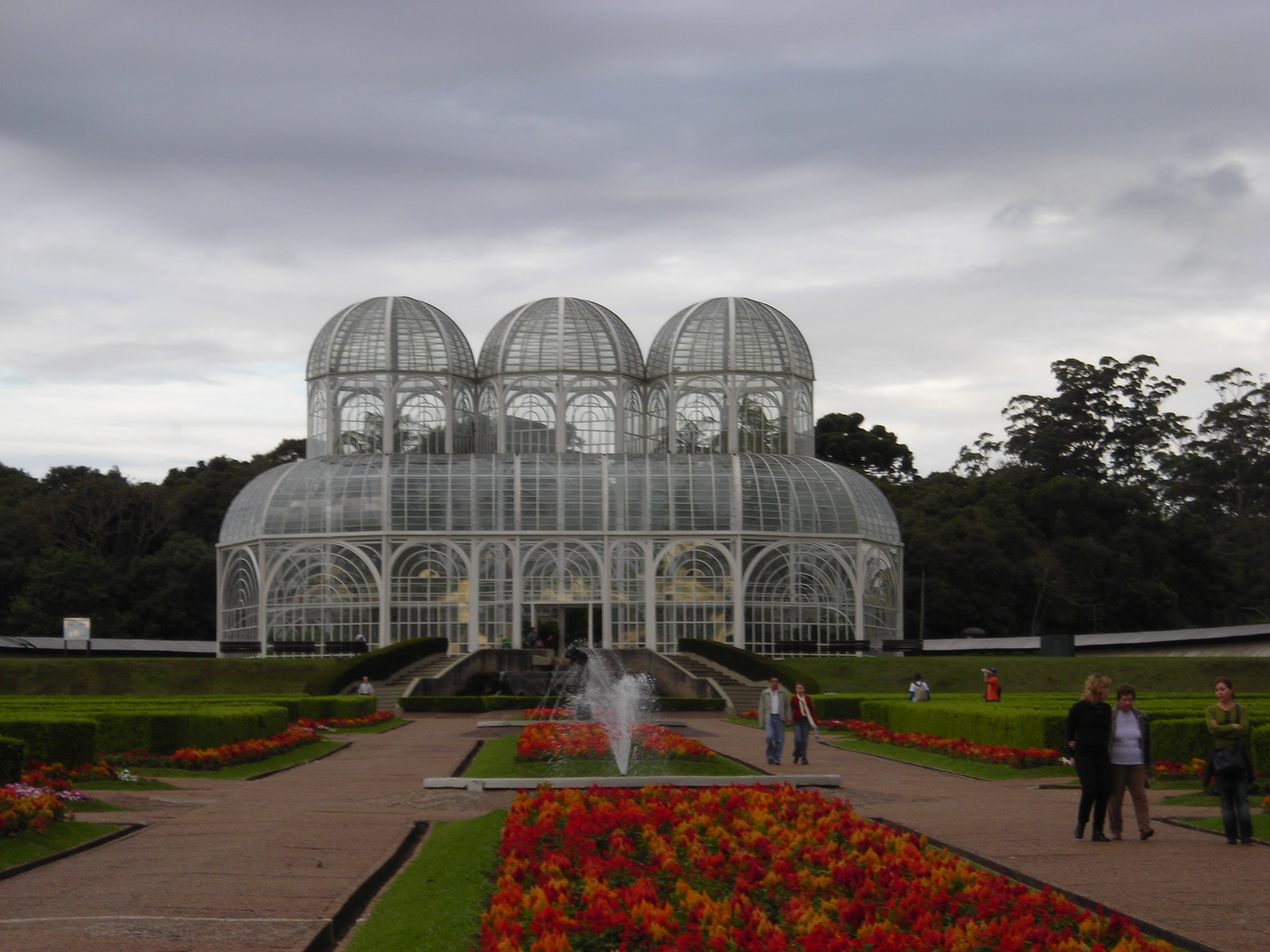
Botanic gardens.

The Botanical Garden of Curitiba were designed in the French style and are a source of botanic reference in Brazil. In the gardens, there is a greenhouse, with a metal frame and a fountain. Visitors can hike along paths through a native forest. The native forest is filled with paths for hiking. There is an exhibition space, a library, a theatre and a sculpture garden.

=== German Woods. ===
The Bosque Alemão is a park in the German style. The native forest covers 38,000 square metres (3.8 ha) of a farm previously owned by a family called Schaffer. In 1933, in the Seminário neighbourhood, a replica of an old wooden church with neo-gothic decorative elements was built which houses the Bach's oratorium concert hall. In the park, there is the "João and Maria" (Hansel and Gretel in Brazilian Portuguese) path, which tells the story of the Brothers Grimm. There is also a children's library; a wooden look-out called the 'Philosophers' Tower'; and, the German Poetry Square. The facade of the square is a reproduction of the Casa Mila facade from the town centre.

=== Barigüi Park. ===
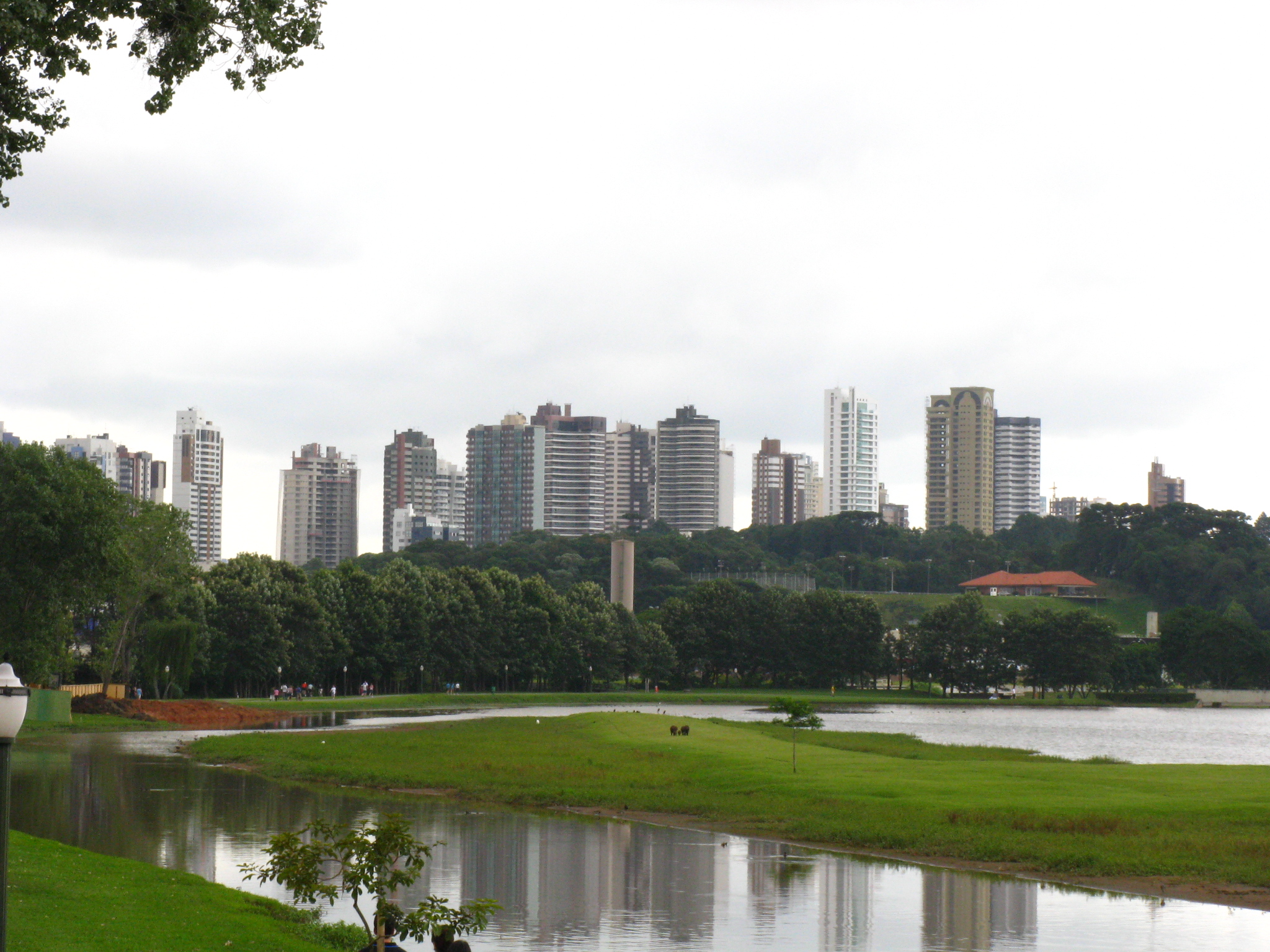
Curitiba From Barigui Park

Covering 1,400,000 square metres (140 ha), the Barigui Park is one of the largest in Curitiba. It is a reserve for fauna such as capybaras, night herons, white herons, opossums, crown sparrows and song-thrushes. The park's amenities include: barbecues, kiosks, cycle tracks, areas for flying model airplanes, courts for various sports, gymnasium equipment, a car park, restaurant, playground, automobile museum, exhibition and convention centre, a steam train station and the headquarters of the municipal council for the environment.

=== Barreirinha Park. ===
In Barreirinha park there are native plants such as araucarias, cinnamon, mimosa (bracatinga) and Paraguay tea plants. The green area helps improve the air quality of Curitiba. The park is used by students and university teachers for practical lessons in lessons. Next to Barreirinha park there is a municipal forest park (200,000 square metres (20 ha) which is used for science (research in the growing of vegetable species) and education. Also, there is a children’s library, a playground, a rustic cabin, snack bar, barbecues and a car park.

=== Gutierrez woods, Chico Mendes memorial and the Dolls' theatre. ===
On 22 March 1989, a memorial to Chico Mendes who pioneered extraction of rubber in the Amazon was opened. It is a green park of 18,000 square metres (1.8 ha) with paths and a natural mineral water spring which supplies 1,350 litres per hour. It is home to the Amazônica school and the Dadá Dolls theatre.

=== Pope’s woods. ===
After Pope John Paul II visited Curitba in July, 1980, a memorial dedicated to Polish immigrants was opened on 13 December 1980 on the site of an old Esterina candle factory. It covers 46,337 square metres (4.6337 ha). The memorial is composed of seven log houses which are a reminder of the faith and struggles of the immigrants which first arrived in 1871. There are objects such as an old cart, a sour cabbage pipe and the patron saint, the Black Virgin of Czestochowa.

=== Portugal woods. ===
The Portugal wood represents an homage to the Bosque de Portugal, the bond between the people of Portugal and Brazil. There is a small brook with a walking track beside it marked with excerpts of the works of famous Portuguese poets. There is also a memorial dedicated to the navigators of Portugal.

=== Passaúna park. ===
Passauna park covers almost 650 square kilometres (65,000 ha) of the Passaúna basin lying to the west of Curitiba. 350 square kilometres (35,000 ha) is covered by the water supply station reservoir. There is a scenic lookout, ecological trails, a biology station and an old brickyard.

=== Capão da Imbuia woods and natural history museum. ===
The museum at Capão da Imbuia features a natural history diorama. Outside, a 400m path through a remnant of the Araucaria forest displays in windows and panels, the natural elements of the forest as well as flora taken from the forest for man's use.

=== Pedreiras park and the Ópera de Arame. ===
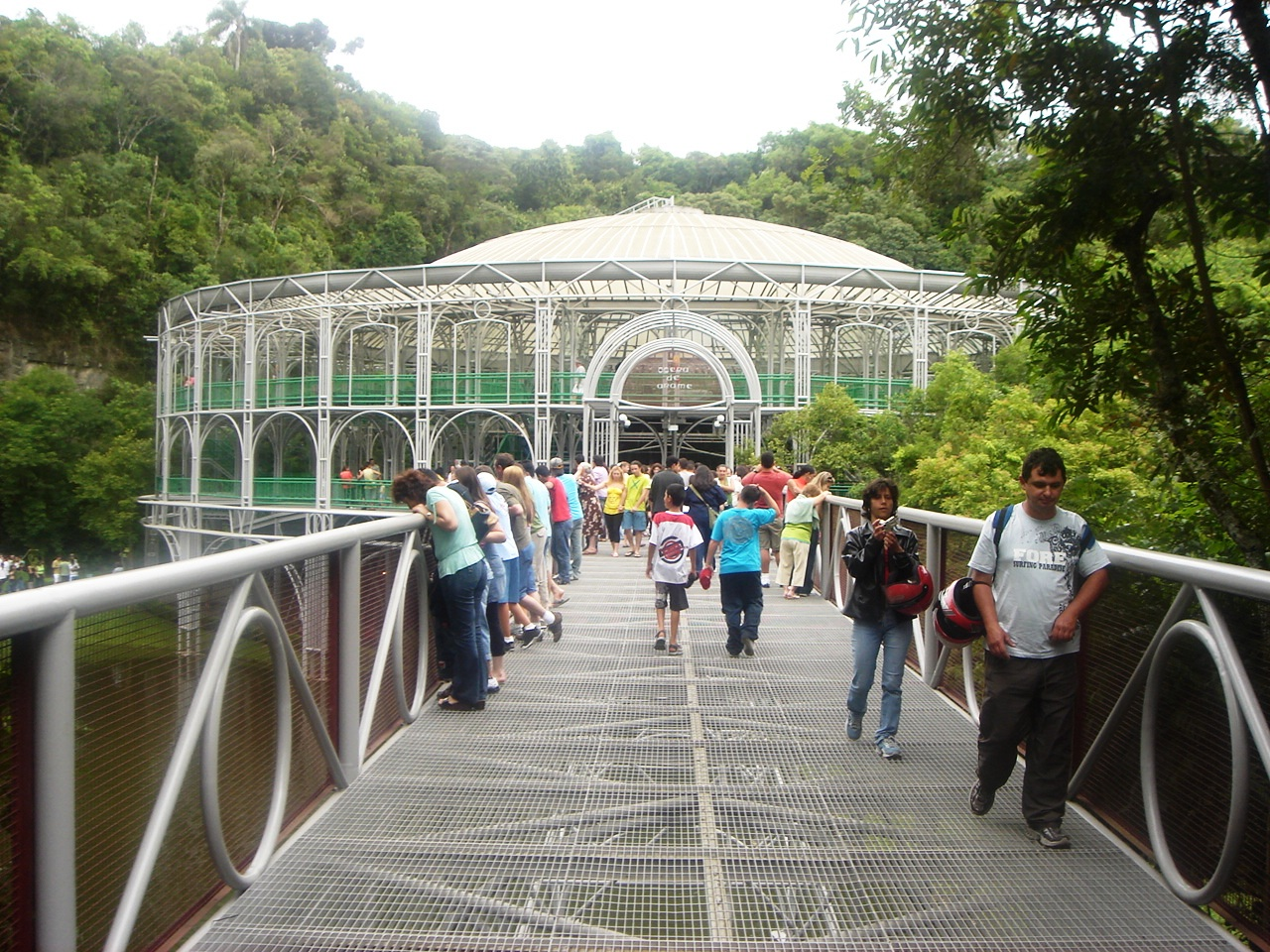
Ópera de Arame.

Within Pedreiras park lies the Ópera de Arame and the Paulo Leminski cultural space. The Wire Opera House, opened in 1992, is a contemporary iconic landmark of Curitiba. It is an open-air theatre with a tubular shape and transparent ceiling set in a landscape of lakes, gardens of local flora and waterfalls. The Paulo Leminski cultural space, opened in 1989, can accommodate major works such as The Passion of Christ, seating 10,000 people.

=== Iguaçu park and zoo. ===
The Iguaçu Park is the largest urban park in Brazil: it covers 800 square kilometres (80,000 ha). There are facilities and amenities for sporting activities such as sailing, fishing and walking. There are also public orchards, conservation areas and a zoo. The zoo houses, in natural habitats, over 1000 animals representing 80 species of the fauna of South America.

=== Tanguá park ===
The Tangua park, which covers 450,000 square feet (42,000 m^{2}), was opened in November 1996. Within the park, are two quarries linked by a 45m long tunnel as well as the Poty Lazzarotto garden. There is also a jogging track, cycle track and lookout.

=== Tingüi park ===
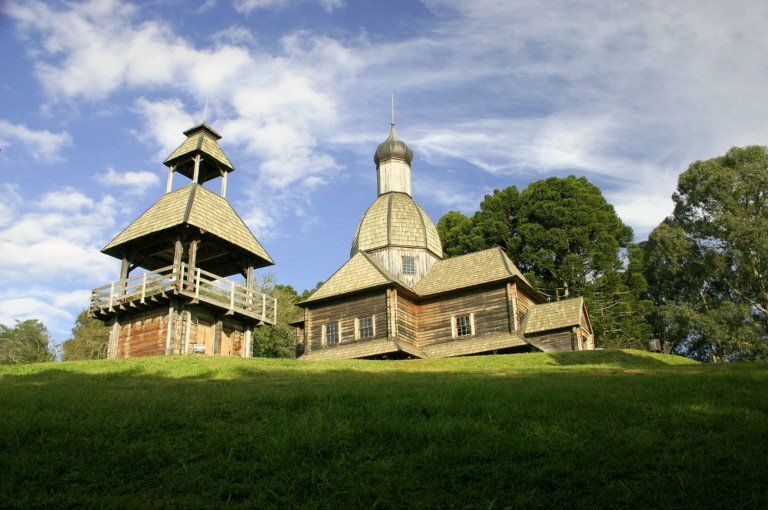
Tingui park.

The Tingui park rests on the banks of the Barigui river. Within, there is a statue of Tindiqüera, a chief of the indigenous people who lived in the area. There is also a memorial to Ukrainian immigrants, which is a replica of an Orthodox church in Paraná state. Displayed in the church are pêssankas and icons.

=== Old botanic gardens ===
On 2 May 1886, Alfredo d’Escragnolle Taunay, president of Paraná province opened this, Curitaba's first public park and zoo. It was created through the draining of marshland. Within the green area, there are lakes, islands and bridges. The zoo shelters small animals. The park's gate is a replica of the one at the dog cemetery of Paris.

=== Reinhard Maack woods ===
This park is dedicated to Reinhard Maack, a German geologist, scientist and conservationist. It was opened in 1989 in an area of native araucaria forest.

=== São Cristóvão ===
A place for the traditional festivals of the Italian community such as the grape and wine fair party, the Wine Party and the 4 Giorni in Italy. It has structure for food and drinks stalls, space for shows and folkloric presentations and a polenta pot. It is located at Margarida Ângela Zardo Miranda Street, s/n°. Opens from Monday to Friday, from 8 am to 5 pm.

=== Tropeiros park ===
The gauchos were cattle drovers who passed near Curitiba on their way to the Sorocaba fair. The park hosts rodeos and traditional dance performances.

== Fountains ==
=== Jerusalem fountain ===
The Jerusalem fountain, named for the city, was designed by Fernando Canalli. The construction in concrete and masonry has a height of 14.5 meters. At the top of the fountain, there are three bronze angels sculpted by Lys Áurea Buzzi. Each weighs approximately 600 kg. Each represents one of the three main monotheistic religions of the world, Christianity, Judaism and Islam.

=== Memory fountain ===
The Memory fountain is dedicated to colonial immigrants who farmed on the outskirts of the city and brought their goods to market in horse-drawn carts. It was designed by Ricardo Tod who featured a horse's head in bronze.

=== Maria Lata D’Água fountain ===
The Maria Lata D'agua fountain opened on 15 May 1996. It is located in an area of historic houses near the Paranaense museum. It features a reproduction of a 1940s sculpture called by Água pro-Morro by Erbo Stenzel of Paraná and a water mirror.

=== Mocinhas da cidade fountain ===
The Mocinhas da cidade fountain is dedicated to Nhô Belarmino and Nhá Gabriela, country music artists of the 1950s. It was designed by Fernando Canalli. It consists of columns with rods holding tiled pictures showing verses of the song, Mocinhas da cidade.

== Memorials ==
=== Arab memorial ===
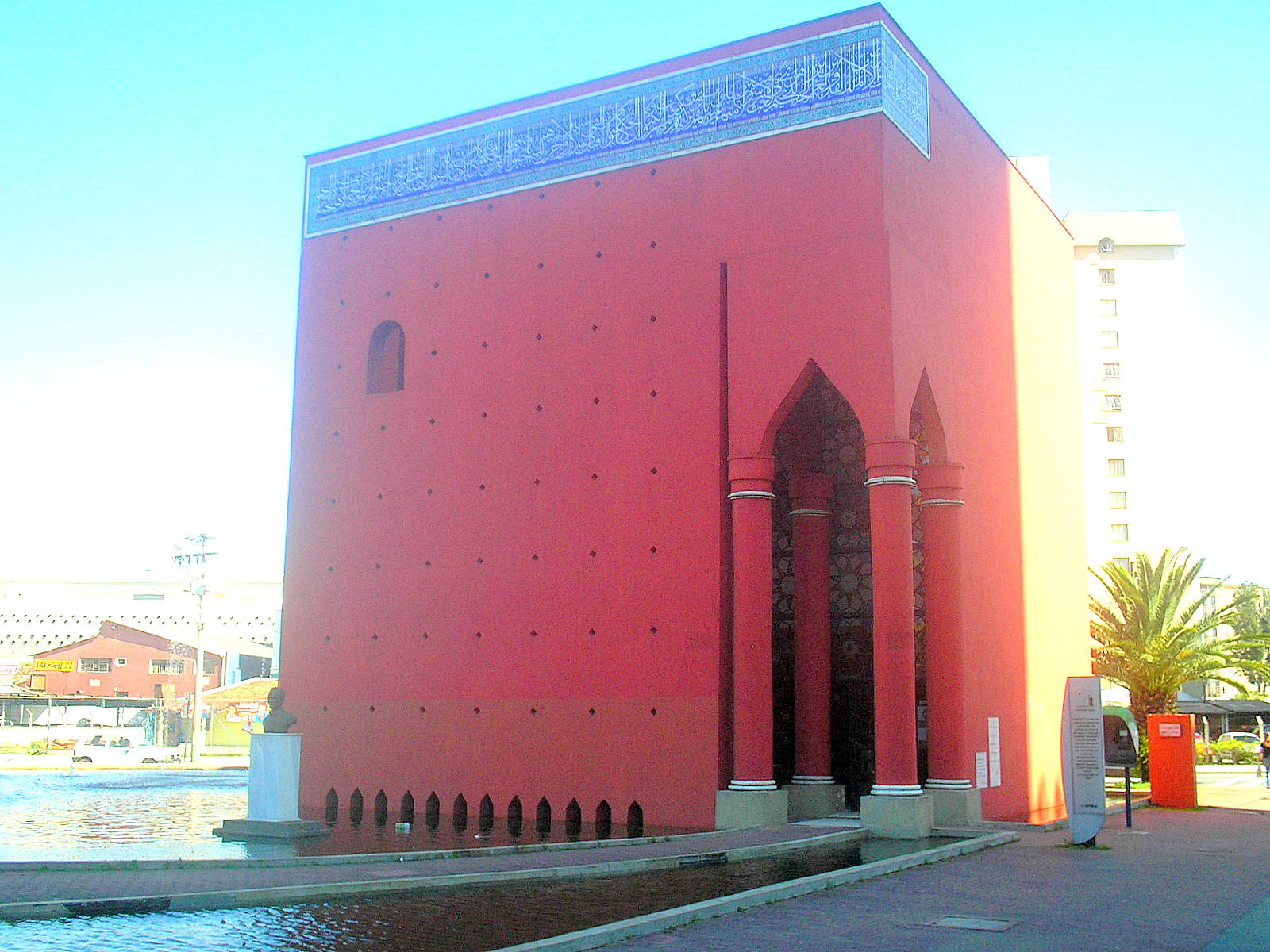
The Arab Memorial.

The Arab memorial (Portuguese: Memorial Árabe) is a specialised library dedicated to Middle-Eastern culture. The building is cube-shaped, designed along Moorish lines with elements such as a vault, columns, arches and stained-glass windows. It is built over a water mirror and houses a sculpture of the writer, Gibran Khalil Gibran.

=== Curitiba memorial ===
The Curitiba memorial is a cultural space for the presentation of art, folklore, history and information. Its architecture, with a dome and with irregular foundations, reflects this purpose.

== Religious landmarks ==
=== AMORC grand lodge ===
The AMORC grand lodge of Brazil was founded in Rio de Janeiro in 1956 and transferred Curitiba in 1960. It is a temple which is part of an architectural complex of six buildings designed in Egyptian style. The other buildings house the H. Spencer Lewis auditorium; a pyramid memorial; a library and museum; and, reproductions of Egyptian relics such as papyrus and mummies.

== Urban landmarks ==
=== Japan square ===
The square is dedicated to Japanese immigrant farmers. Japan sent 30 cherry trees for the square which is designed in the Japanese style. In 1993, a Japanese gate, a cultural centre and a tea house were built in the square.

=== Tiradentes square ===
The Tiradentes square, previously called Largo da Matriz, commemorates the founding of Curitiba, on 29 March 1693, in the region of the square. In 1880, the square was renamed D. Pedro II square in honour of the emperor's visit to Paraná. In 1889, at the beginning of the Republic the square was renamed Tiradentes. The square is a public transport terminal and meeting point.

=== 24 hour street ===
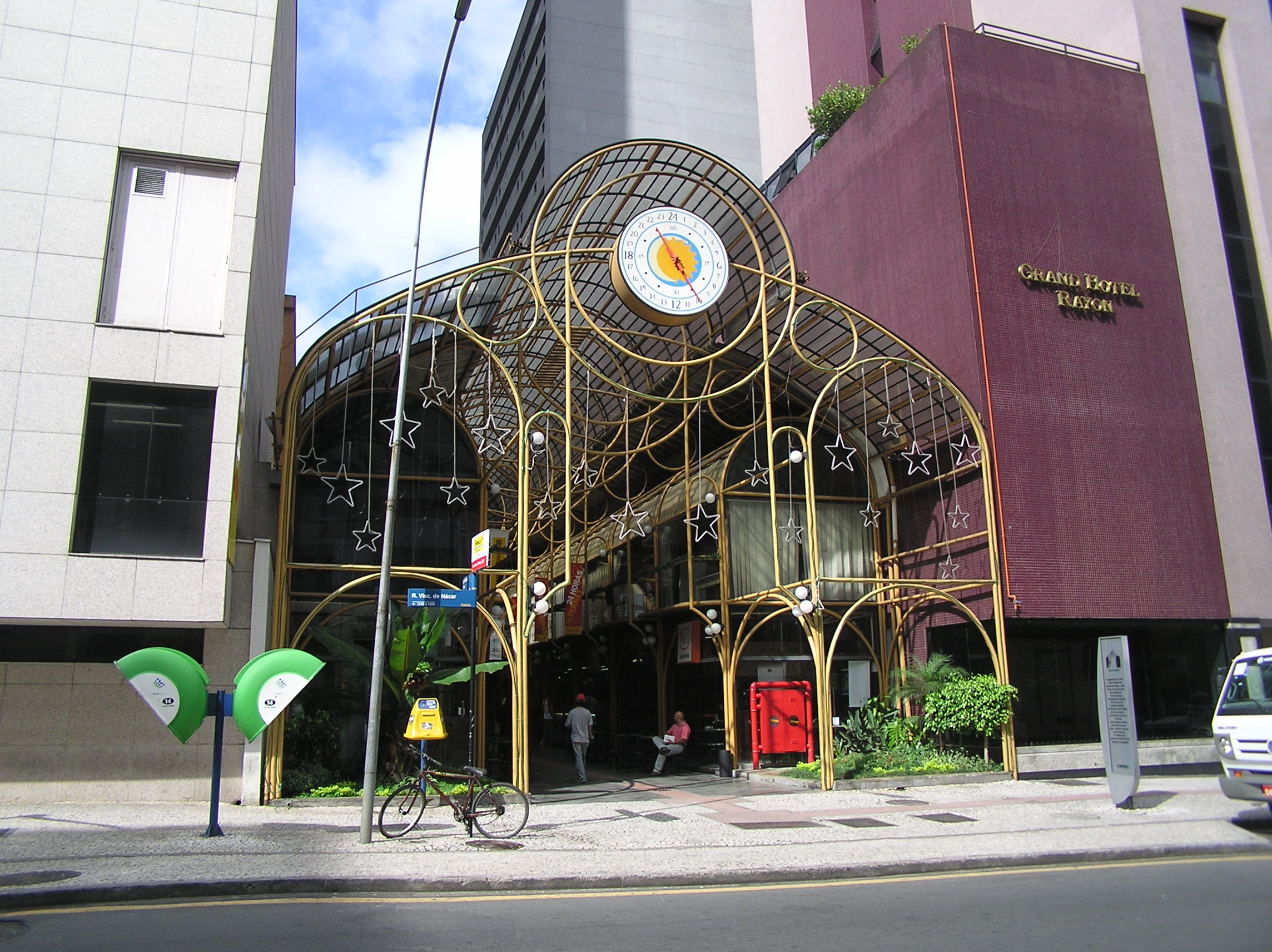
24 hour street.

24 Horas is known as "the street that never sleeps, for the city that never sleeps". The street is 120m long and 12m wide. Over the street are 32 metal tubular arches, typical of the contemporary Curitiban architecture. There are 34 shops selling various goods 24 hours per day. The street is a meeting point, place of leisure, cuisine and nightlife for tourists and locals.

=== João Cândido square ===
At João Cândido square are the stone ruins of the never finished São Francisco de Paula church. The church's chapel and sacristy were completed in 1811. In 1860, the stones for the church's construction were used in the old Matriz tower, Basilica Cathedral Minor of Our Lady of Lighted. A mythology of pirates and secret tunnels have developed about the square which today is used for leisure, business, and entertainment as the Ruins Arcades.

=== Santa Felicidade ===
Santa Felicidade is the neighbourhood where Italian immigrants settled for farming, herb growing, willow tree growing (for furniture) and wine and cheese making. The district church and nearby cemetery have 18 chapels built in the neo-classical style. Other architecturally important landmarks in the district include the Geraniums house, the Panels house, the Arcades house and the Culpi house. The district hosts restaurants which serve traditional Italian colonial food and wine.

=== Curitiba historic area ===
The historic area includes Romário Martin's house (1700s); the Church of the Third Order of Saint Francis (1737); and, German style buildings (latter 1800s). On Sunday mornings, the area hosts a craft fair. It takes place at the Largo da Ordem; the entrance to Garibaldi Square; Rosário Church, the Flowers clock, Memory fountain and the Società Giuseppe Garibaldi.

=== Farol das cidades ===
The Farol das cidades municipal library is designed around the ancient library and lighthouse of Alexandria. It covers 98 square meters and is 17m tall. Its reference collection contains 5000 books housed on the ground floor and makes use of internet technology. A spiral staircase climbs through the tower where there is a vault built in metal and on top, a rooster.

=== Guaíra theatre ===
The theatre, originally the Theatro São Theodoro opened in 1884 and was renamed the Guaira theatre in 1900. It was demolished in 1930 and rebuilt in 1952 for the celebration of the centenary of political emancipation of Paraná (19 December 1953). The theatre was completed in the 1970s. There are three auditoriums, the largest with 2,173 seats.

=== Paiol theatre ===
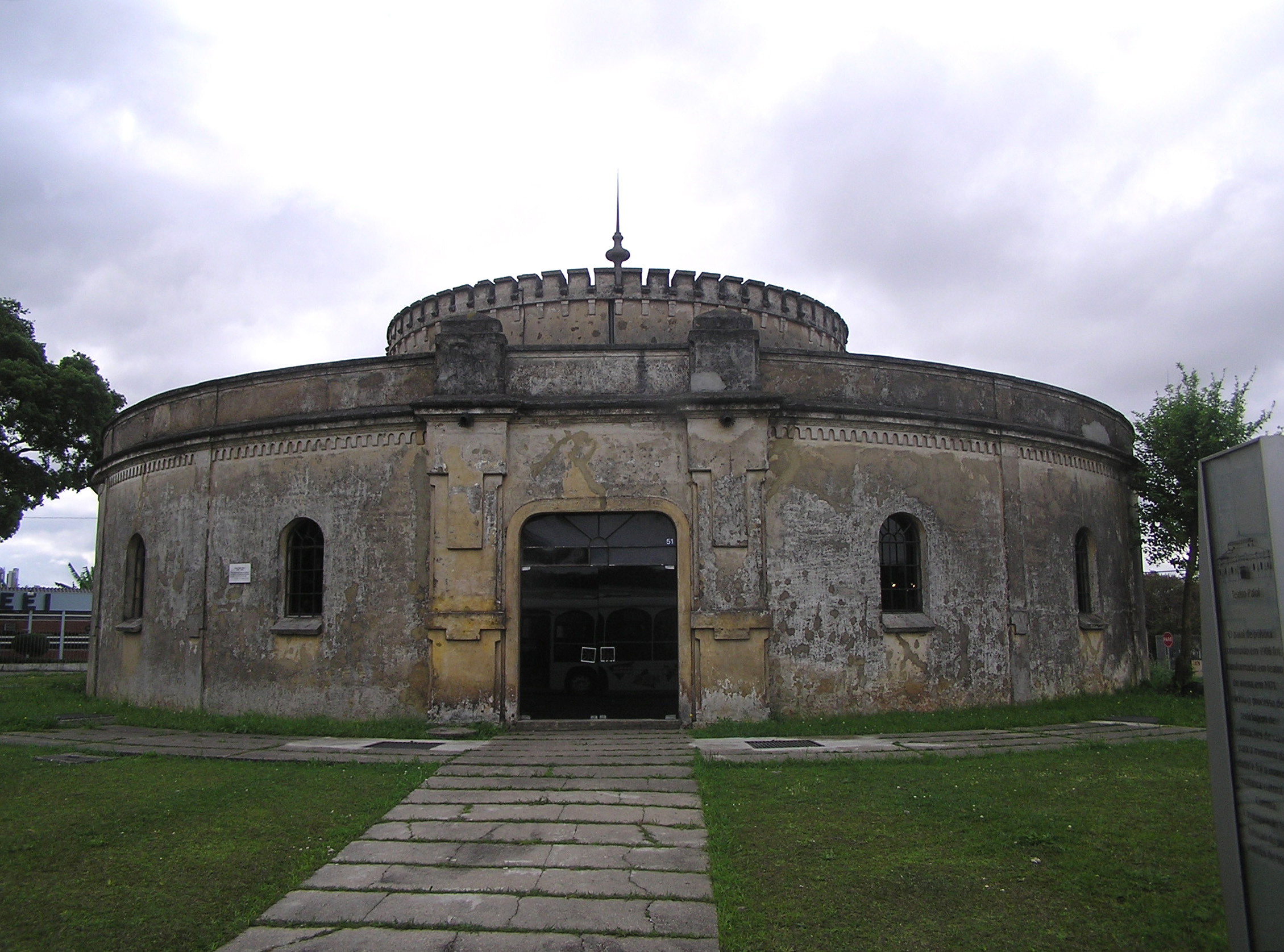
Paiol theatre.

The Paiol theatre is an example of changes made in Curitiba in the 1970s when historic buildings were recycled for new uses. In this case, a gunpowder hold, built in 1906, became the theatre which opened on 27 December 1971. The theatre was christened by the poet, Vinícius de Moraes, with whisky and a song called Paiol de Pólvora composed for the occasion. Toquinho and Marília Medalha also took part.

=== Mercês tower ===
The Mercês Tower (95m), managed by Telepar and Curitiba City Hall, is the highest point in the town and a scenic lookout. It houses the Telephone museum.

== See also ==
- Curitiba, the main article.
- Autódromo Internacional de Curitiba, the international motor-racing circuit.
- Feirinha do largo da ordem, the open-air Sunday markets.
