= Little Italy =

Neighborhoods populated by Italians

- Neighborhoods
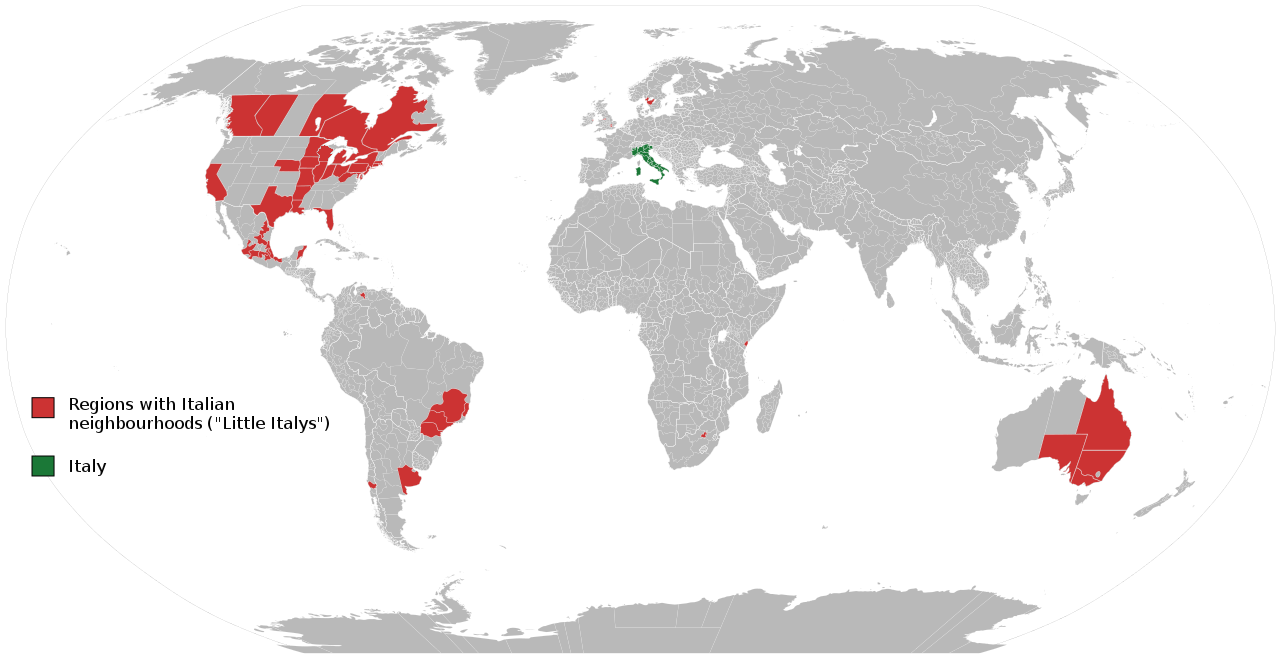
- World map of first level subdivisions (states, counties, provinces, etc.) that are home to Little Italys or Italian neighbourhoods

- Flag

Little Italy is the catch-all name for an ethnic enclave populated primarily by Italians or people of Italian ancestry, usually in an urban neighborhood. The concept of "Little Italy" holds many different aspects of the Italian culture. There are shops selling Italian goods as well as Italian restaurants lining the streets. A "Little Italy" strives essentially to have a version of the country of Italy placed in the middle of a large non-Italian city. This sort of enclave is often the result of periods of Italian immigration, during which people of the same culture settled or were ostracized and segregated together in certain areas. As cities modernized and grew, these areas became known for their ethnic associations, and ethnic neighborhoods like "Little Italy" blossomed, becoming the areas they are today.

== Etymology ==
Before the popularization of the name "Little Italy", Italian ethnic enclaves were most often referred to in English as the “Italian colony”. The term "Little Italy" was coined in the mid-1880s, and its oldest recorded use was by The New York Times in 1886, in reference to the Italian ethnic enclave that had developed on the Lower East Side of Manhattan. The name "Little Italy" is modeled after "Little Germany" (Kleindeutschland), a historic German ethnic enclave in Manhattan that predated the newly emerging Italian one located nearby. Only after 1900 did "Little Italy" replace "Italian colony" as the most frequently used label for immigrant Italian ethnic enclaves.

== List of Little Italys ==
=== Australia ===
- Little Italy, Melbourne
- Norton Street, Sydney
- Beaumont Street, Newcastle
- New Farm, Queensland

=== Canada ===
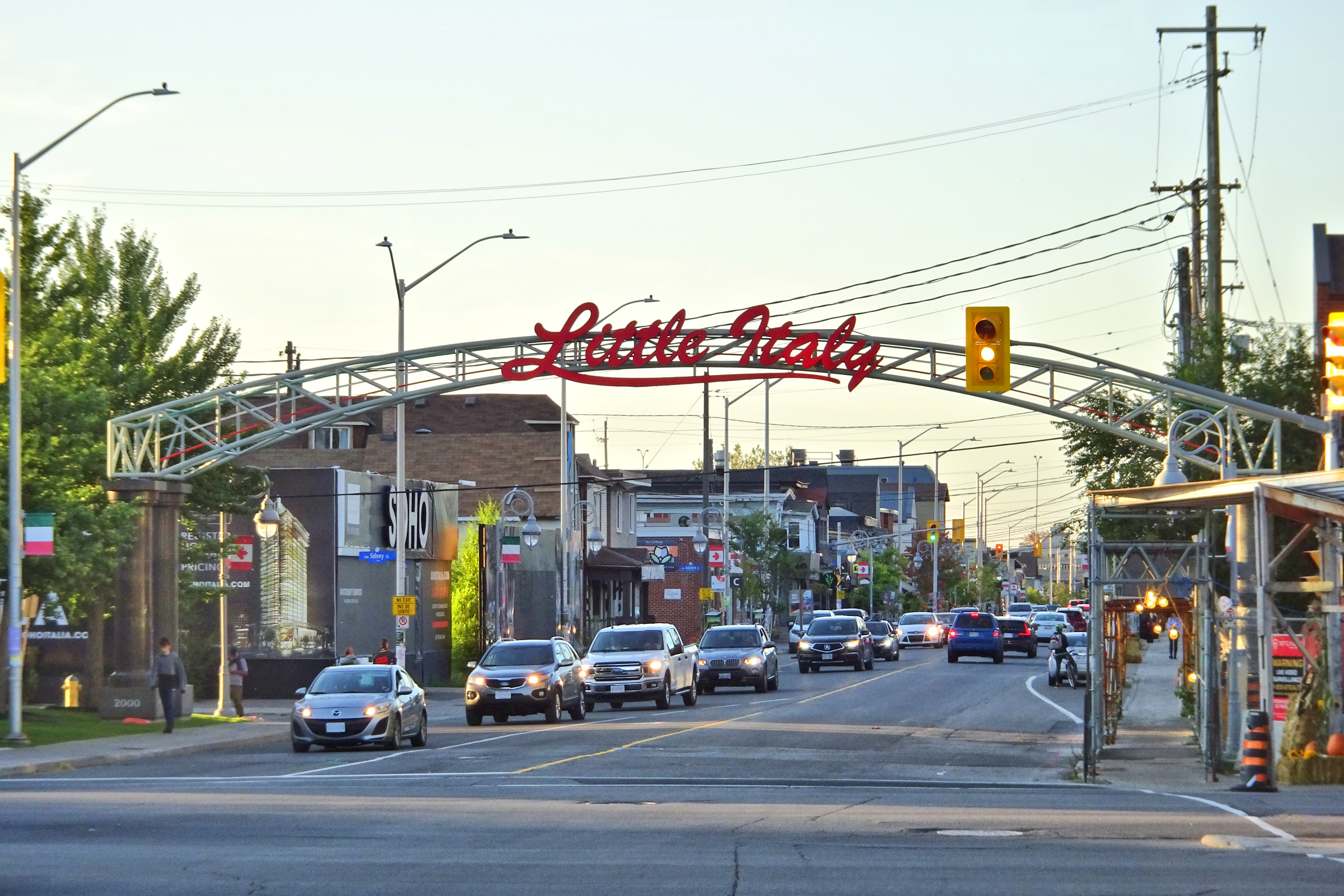
Little Italy in Ottawa

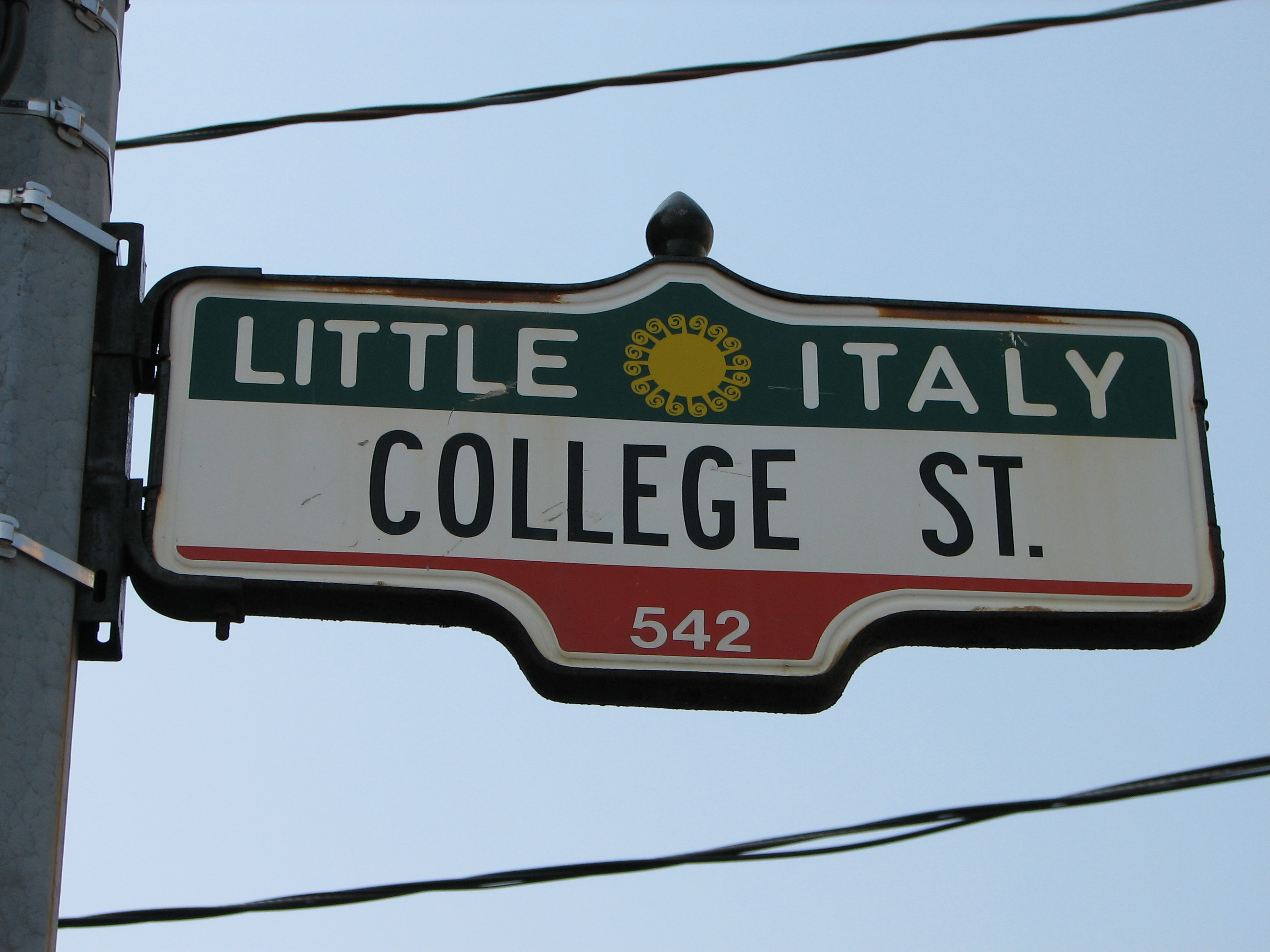
Sign of College Street, centre of Little Italy, Toronto

- Little Italy, Edmonton, in Alberta
- Little Italy, Montreal, in Quebec
- Little Italy, Ottawa, in Ontario
- Little Italy, Toronto, in Ontario
- Little Italy, Vancouver, in British Columbia
- Little Italy, Windsor, in Ontario
- Little Italy, Winnipeg, in Manitoba

=== New Zealand ===
- Island Bay, Wellington, is often nicknamed "Little Italy"

=== United Kingdom ===
- Little Italy in Clerkenwell, London.
- The area around Wardour Street and Old Compton Street in Soho, London used to be known as Little Italy.
- Ancoats in Manchester used to be known as Little Italy.
- The area around Scotland Road in Liverpool used to be known as Little Italy.
- The area around Fazeley Street in Digbeth in Birmingham used to be known as Little Italy.

=== United States ===
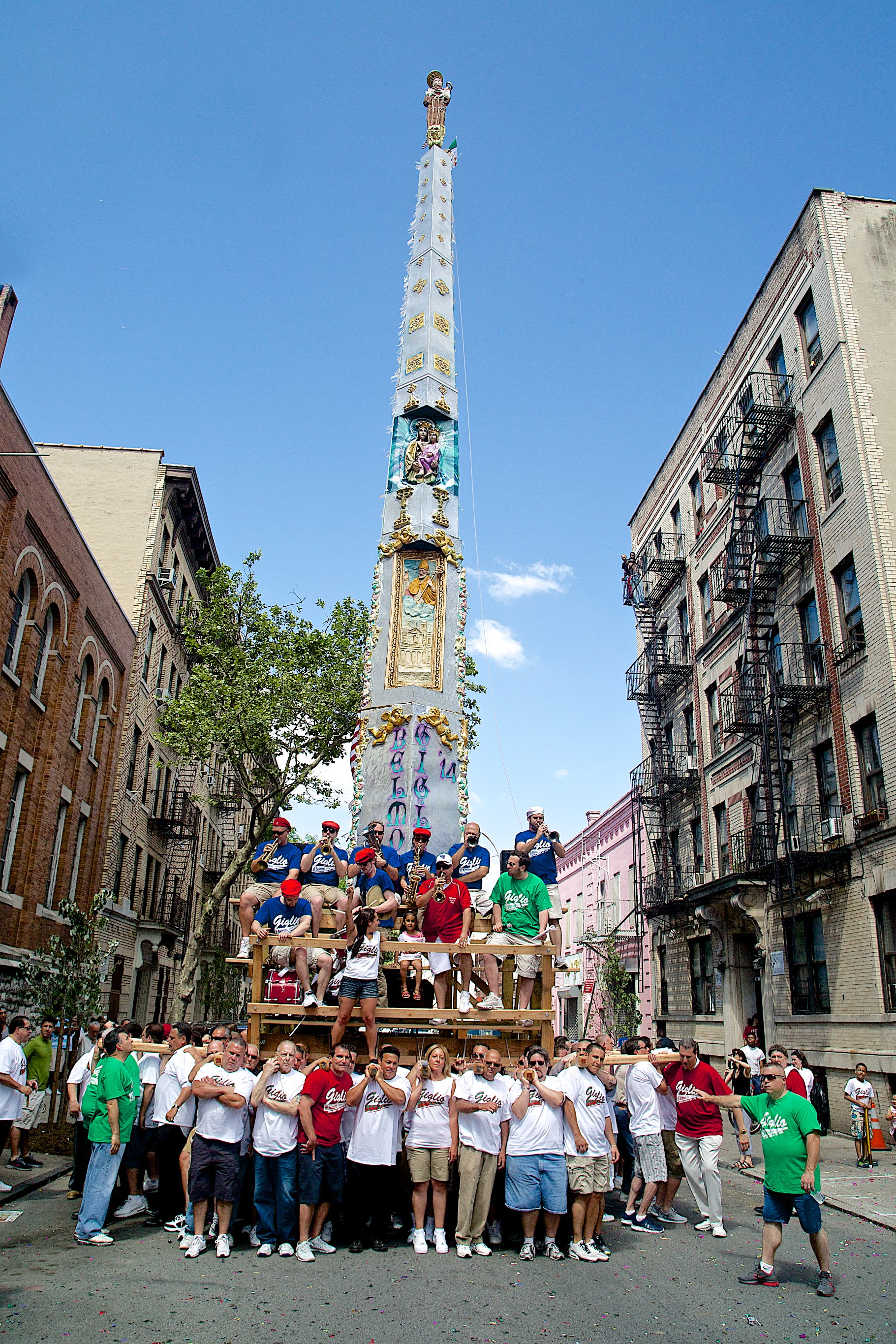
Arthur Avenue, a Little Italy in the Bronx, New York

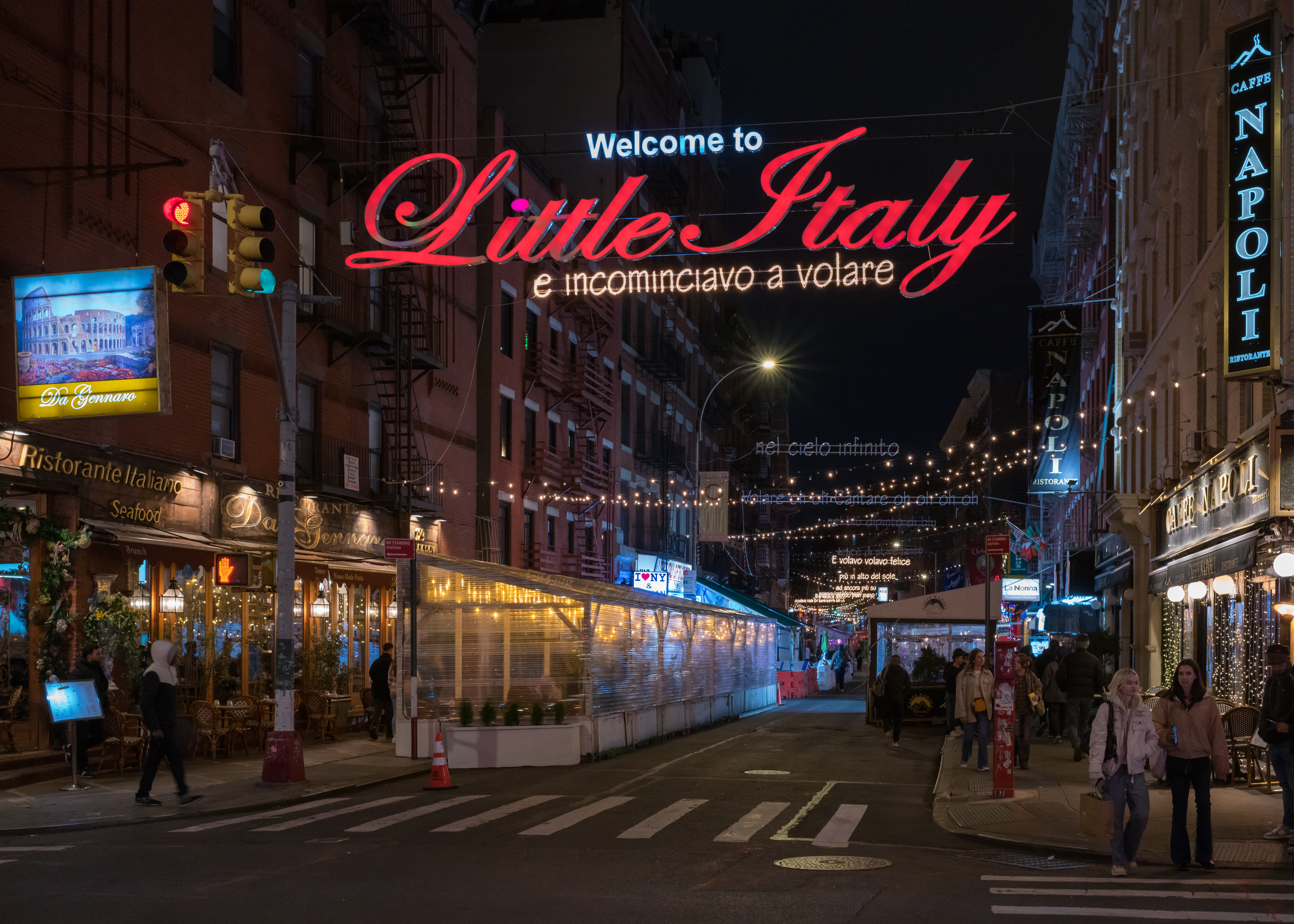
Mulberry Street in Little Italy, Manhattan, New York, at night

- Several Little Italys exist in New York City, including but not limited to:
  - Little Italy, Manhattan
  - Italian Harlem
  - Arthur Avenue, Bronx
  - Morris Park, Bronx
  - Bensonhurst, Brooklyn
  - Dyker Heights, Brooklyn
  - Carroll Gardens, Brooklyn
  - Italian Williamsburg, Brooklyn
  - Ozone Park, Queens
  - Howard Beach, Queens
  - Middle Village, Queens
  - Rosebank, Staten Island
- Philadelphia, home to the second-largest Italian-American population in the United States, also has several Little Italys:
  - South Philadelphia – largely Italian
    - Bella Vista
    - Central South Philadelphia
    - Girard Estate
    - Italian Market
    - Marconi Plaza
    - Packer Park
    - Passyunk West
    - St. Richard
    - Whitman
  - Overbrook/West Philadelphia
  - Areas of Kensington
  - Sections of Northeast Philadelphia
    - Mayfair
    - Tacony
  - Sections of Southwest Philadelphia
  - Areas of West Kensington
- New England:
  - Little Italy, Millinocket, Maine
  - North End, Boston, in Massachusetts
  - Little Italy, Bridgeport, in Connecticut
  - Federal Hill, Providence, in Rhode Island
  - Little Italy, Waterbury, in Connecticut
  - Wooster Square, in New Haven, Connecticut
- New York:
  - Dunwoodie, Yonkers, New York
  - Little Italy, Schenectady, in New York
  - Little Italy, Rochester, New York
  - Little Italy, Syracuse, in New York
  - Little Italy, Poughkeepsie, New York
  - Little Italy, Troy, New York
  - Mansion Hill, Albany, New York
- Pennsylvania:
  - Bloomfield, Pittsburgh, Pennsylvania
  - Little Italy, Connellsville, in Pennsylvania
  - Little Italy in Erie, Pennsylvania
  - Roseto, Pennsylvania
- New Jersey:
  - Chambersburg and South Trenton, New Jersey
  - Little Italy, Paterson, New Jersey
- California:
  - Little Italy, San Diego
  - North Beach, San Francisco
  - San Pedro, Los Angeles
- Other:
  - Little Italy, Clinton, Indiana
  - Little Italy, Chicago, in Illinois
  - Little Italy, Arkansas
  - Little Italy, Baltimore, in Maryland
  - Little Italy, Wilmington, in Delaware
  - Little Italy, Cleveland, in Ohio
  - Little Italy, Omaha, in Nebraska
  - The Hill in St. Louis, Missouri
  - West Seventh in St. Paul, Minnesota
  - Independence, Louisiana
  - Little Italy, Clay County, West Virginia
  - Little Italy, Randolph County, West Virginia

=== Republic of Ireland ===
- The Italian Quarter, Dublin
- Little Italy, Dublin. An Italian migrant quarter that existed in the vicinity of Werburgh Street.

== Other Italian neighborhoods ==
Some Italian neighborhoods may have other names, but are colloquially referred to as "Little Italy", including:

=== Argentina ===
- La Boca, Buenos Aires

=== Australia ===
- Norton Street: in the Sydney suburb of Leichhardt
- Ramsay Street: in the Sydney suburb of Haberfield
- Campbelltown/Athelstone/Newton/ Payneham in Adelaide
- New Farm in Brisbane
- New Italy, New South Wales

=== Brazil ===
- Mooca, São Paulo
- Bixiga, São Paulo
- Santa Felicidade, Curitiba, Paraná
- Savassi, Belo Horizonte, Minas Gerais

=== Canada ===
- St. Leonard, a borough of Montreal with a large Italian population
- LaSalle, a borough in Montreal with a large Italian population
- Rivière-des-Prairies–Pointe-aux-Trembles, another borough of Montreal with a prominent Italian population
- Corso Italia, a neighbourhood in Toronto
- Vaughan, Ontario, a city in north of Toronto with a high population of Italians
- Stoney Creek, Hamilton, Ontario
- North Burnaby, British Columbia

=== Chile ===
- Barrio Italia, Ñuñoa, Santiago de Chile
- Capitán Pastene, northwest Temuco

=== Kenya ===
- Malindi District, Kilifi County

=== South Africa ===
- Orange Grove, Johannesburg

=== United Kingdom ===
- Bedford, where the population is about 8% Italian or of Italian heritage.
- Hoddesdon, in Hertfordshire, has a large Sicilian population.
- Glasgow is the centre of the Scottish Italian community.

=== United States ===
- Spaghetti Hill, Monterey, California
- Little Italy/Morse Park Historic District, Wheat Ridge, Colorado
- Thompsonville (Enfield), Connecticut
- Italia in northern Florida
- Pompano Beach, Florida; a section is partially an Italian neighborhood.
- Taylor Street Archives, Chicago, Illinois (the port-of-call for Chicago's Italian Americans)
- Heart of Italy, Chicago, Illinois
- Little Sicily, Chicago, Illinois
- Bridgeport, Chicago, Illinois
- Dunning, Chicago
- Holy Rosary Neighborhood, Indianapolis, Indiana
- South Des Moines, Des Moines, Iowa
- Old Forge, Lackawanna County, Pennsylvania (also known as "The Pizza Capital of the World" for their pizza)
- Little Italy, Baltimore, Maryland
- North End, Boston, Massachusetts
- Columbus Park, Kansas City, Missouri
- The Hill, St. Louis, Missouri
- North East, Kansas City, Missouri (formerly Columbus Square)
- Eastern Market, Detroit, Michigan, considered to be the city's "Little Italy"
- Little Italy, Omaha, Nebraska
- Seventh Avenue, Newark, New Jersey
- Varick Street, Utica, New York
- Dominick Street, Rome, New York
- North Side, Buffalo, New York, though "Little Italy" was considered the West Side of the city
- Schenectady, New York, proposed "Little Italy" from Hillary Clinton, to run through sections of downtown.
- Utica, New York, East Side considered to be city's "Little Italy"
- Brier Hill, Youngstown, Ohio
- Italian Village (Columbus), Ohio
- Easton, Pennsylvania
- Johnston, Rhode Island has the highest percentage of Italian Americans of any municipality in the country.
- Galveston, Texas, south of Houston, highest Italian-American population in the Greater Houston as well as Texas.
- Judiciary Square, Washington, D.C.

== See also ==
- Chinatown
- Ethnic enclave
- Italian diaspora
