= Anthony Biase =

Anthony Biase may refer to:

- Anthony J. Biase (1909–1991), Omaha mobster
- Anthony Di Biase (born 1988), Canadian soccer player
