= Mellona Moulton Butterfield =

American china painter, teacher

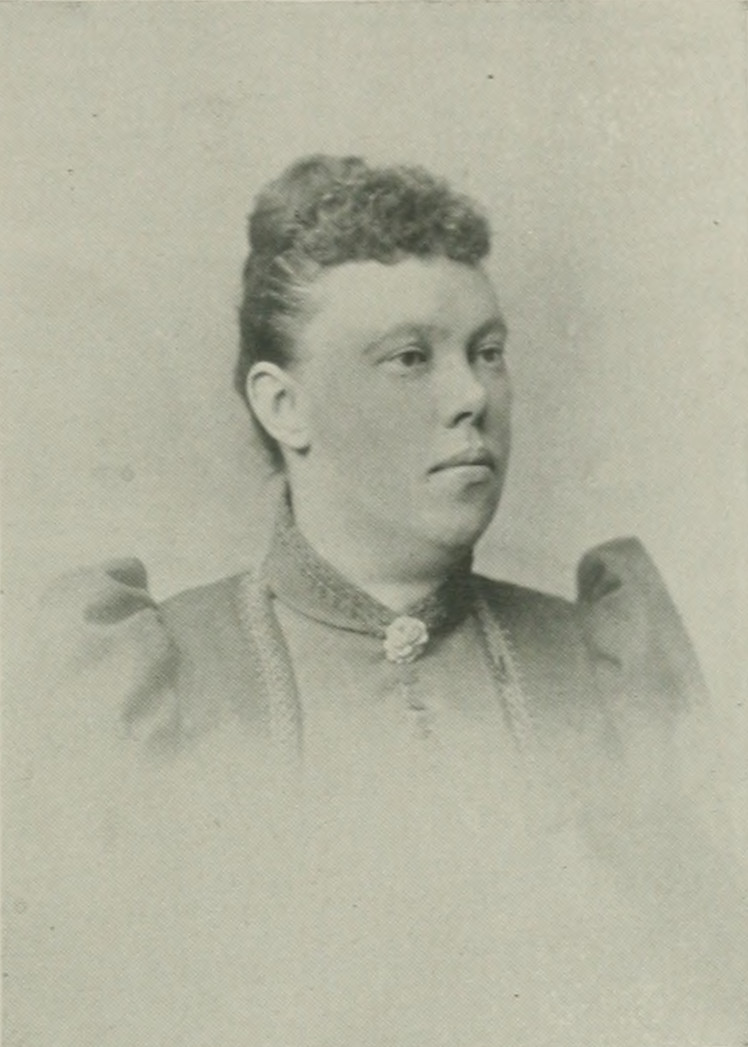
Mellona Moulton Butterfield, "A woman of the century"

Mellona Moulton Butterfield (May 15, 1853 – 1924) was an American china painter and teacher. The owner of her own kiln for the firing of china, it may have been the first china kiln in Nebraska.

== Early years and education ==
Mellona ("Mellie") Moulton Butterfield was born in Racine, Wisconsin, May 15, 1853. Her parents were Moses B. Butterfield, a lawyer of Homer, New York, and Mellona (Moulton) Butterfield (1806-1854) of Oxford, Massachusetts. There were two siblings, Emily and Fannie, who, like Mellona, became teachers.

Butterfield was educated in St. Louis, Missouri, and Omaha, Nebraska, and was a graduate of Brownell Hall in Omaha.

== Career ==
She was for twelve years engaged in teaching, which vocation she followed with success in Plattsmouth, Grand Island, and Hastings, Nebraska. During those years, she followed, as devotedly as circumstances would allow, the one art toward which her talents and inclinations tended. At last she gave up other work and applied herself exclusively to ceramic painting, establishing a studio in Omaha. She was one of the first artists in that line in the State of Nebraska. She received many favorable notices from art critics and the press. Her studio was located at 894 Brandeis Building, in Omaha.

She married Charles H. Healey in 1881. She received the first honorable mention for china-painting in the woman's department of the 1884 New Orleans World's Fair, and in 1889, the first gold medal for china-painting given by the Western Art Association in Omaha. The Nebraska Ceramic Club was organized in 1893 for the purpose of making an exhibit at the World's Columbian Exposition. By 1898, it was composed wholly of women, totaling nearly one hundred, with Butterfield as its president. At the 1898 World's Fair, Butterfield supervised the decorating of the Nebraska State Building, and served as the building's hostess. In the following year, she managed the Public Comfort Building. Her work was exhibited in New York City, St. Louis, and Buffalo, New York.

She died in 1924.
