= Neble House =

- Location within Nebraska
- 41°13′57″N 95°55′47″W
- Location: Omaha, Nebraska

History
- Built: 1894

Site notes
- Architectural style: French Second Empire style
- Owner: Ronald T. and Jeanette Wilczek

Omaha Landmark
- Designated: November 18, 1980

The Angeline Hansen Neble House is located at 2752 South 10th Street in South Omaha, Nebraska. Built in 1894 in the French Second Empire style, the house was designated an Omaha Landmark on November 18, 1980. It is one of very few examples of the French Second Empire style remaining in Omaha today.

== History ==
Angeline Hansen Neble was the daughter of Mark Hansen, a prominent Danish-American in Omaha and the founder of Den Danske Pioneer, a Danish-language newspaper based in Omaha. The land on which the Neble House was built was given to Neble by her father in order for her and her husband, John Neble, to construct their home. Mark Hansen lived nearby in the 1893 Mark Hansen Residence, a house with a similar architectural style.

Neble and her husband lived in the Neble House until the early 1920s. Neble also ran a ceramics studio in the house.

At the time of the Neble House's Omaha Landmark designation, it was being used to house five apartments and was recently renovated.

== Architecture ==
The Neble House is notable for being one of the few buildings of the French Second Empire style, which was most prominent in the United States between 1860 and 1890, remaining in Omaha. The typical elements of this style that are featured in the Neble House include a mansard roof with concave sides, pedimented dormers, heavy-projecting cornice, and a veranda-like porch.

The porch also includes Classical details and Italianate moldings. The style of the porch, a central projecting porch that splits the mansard roof, is an early example of the Classical Revival style that was popular in residential buildings in Omaha between the late 1890s and the 1910s.

The house is made of brick and painted white. It was originally constructed for $2,500.
