= Little Italy, Connellsville =

Coordinates: 40.01617°N 79.59650°W

Little Italy, Connellsville is an area on the west side of Connellsville, in Fayette County, Pennsylvania.

== History ==
Between 1880 and 1930, a flood of immigrants from Italy and many other European countries arrived in Connellsville, Pennsylvania, and its vicinity, primarily to work in the coal, coke, steel, and locomotive industries. Many of the Italian immigrants, mainly from the regions of Campania (cities of Naples and Avellino), Abruzzo, Basilicata, Calabria and Sicily, settled in the neighborhoods of the west side of what is now known as the city of Connellsville. Originally, the part of Connellsville west of the Youghiogheny River was incorporated as the borough of New Haven, but by a charter of 1909, New Haven was annexed by the city of Connellsville. The neighborhood, formerly known as "New Haven Hill," and now as "West Side Hill," was heavily populated by Italian immigrants, and their Italian-American descendants. Because of this, the area has earned the title "Little Italy." In the Roman Catholic tradition, the neighborhood has a patron saint, that being Saint Rita of Cascia (IT:Santa Rita da Cascia).

== Location ==
Little Italy in Connellsville is formally bounded by West Crawford Avenue to the south, Maple Street to the north, North 12th Street to the west, and West Crawford Avenue (which makes a 90-degree angle) to the south, though the Italian-American population has always had a strong presence beyond the formal boundaries, including Brookvale, Trotter, Hickory Bottom, Robinson Falls, Limestone Hill, and the lower West Side, where one of the most central places of the Italian-American culture in Connellsville is situated: Saint Rita of Cascia Roman Catholic Church (La Chiesa Cattolica Romana di Santa Rita da Cascia), located at the merging of South 2nd Street and South 1st Street.

Note: There is also a strong Italian-American presence in the city's Association Grounds and North End neighborhoods, on the east side of the Youghiogheny River.

== Festivals ==
=== Annual Italian festival ===
Each year on the weekend prior to the Feast of Our Lady of Mount Carmel (La Beata Vergine di Monte Carmelo), the church hosts its annual Italian festival, known famously throughout the city as "Saint Rita's Street Fair." There, you will find traditional Italian delicacies, such as cavatelli, manicotti, pasta fagioli, sausage and peppers, pizza, and fried dough (zeppole), as well as other festivities, such as games of chance, bingo, a large 50/50 drawing, and traditional Italian and Italian-American music. Thousands of people from all over come each year to enjoy the festivities.

=== Annual West Side Hill Italian Bash ===
Every year in July, Little Italy on West Side Hill in Connellsville, is the scene of a large festival to celebrate the Italian American heritage, known as the "Annual West Side Hill Italian Bash." The celebration is held on Banning Avenue, between North 11th Street and North 10th Street. Highlights include a flag raising and singing of the Italian National Anthem, Il Canto degli Italiani, commonly known as "Inno di Mameli," to signify the commencement of the festival, traditional Italian food, wine sampling, selections by the Molinaro Band (formerly the Royal Italian Band), a 50/50 drawing, traditional Italian music, a prize raffle, and a display of fireworks, to signify the end of the celebration.

=== Italian feast days ===
Similar festivals are also celebrated on popular Italian Feast Days, such as the Feast of Saint Rita of Cascia (La Festa di Santa Rita da Cascia), which is held on May 22, the Feast of Saint Anthony of Padua (La Festa di Sant'Antonio di Padova), which is celebrated on June 13, and the Feast of Our Lady of the Hill (La Santissima Madonna del Colle)*, which coincides with the Feast of Our Lady of Sorrows (La Santissima Madonna Addolorata), and is celebrated on September 15.

The Feast of Saint John the Baptist (La Festa di San Giovanni Battista), which is celebrated on June 24, the Feast of Saint Rocco (La Festa di San Rocco), which is celebrated on August 16, and the Feast of Saint Amato (La Festa di Sant'Amato), which is held on September 30, are also popular amongst the Italian-Americans of Connellsville, especially amongst those whose ancestors originated in the Avellino province of Italy.

- The Feast of Madonna del Colle (Our Lady of the Hill) originated in Lenola, Italy. This is also the town where the founder of the Molinaro Band, Giovanni Molinaro, was born. His brother Michael brought the tradition to America when he emigrated in 1913. The band has been led by members of the Molinaro family for 96 years and is currently under the direction of Henry F. (Angelo) Molinaro. Henry has also directed the St. Rita's choir for the past 55 years.
