= Arthur Llewellyn Williams =

Canadian bishop (1856–1919)

The Right Reverend Arthur Llewellyn Williams D.D.
- Bishop of Nebraska
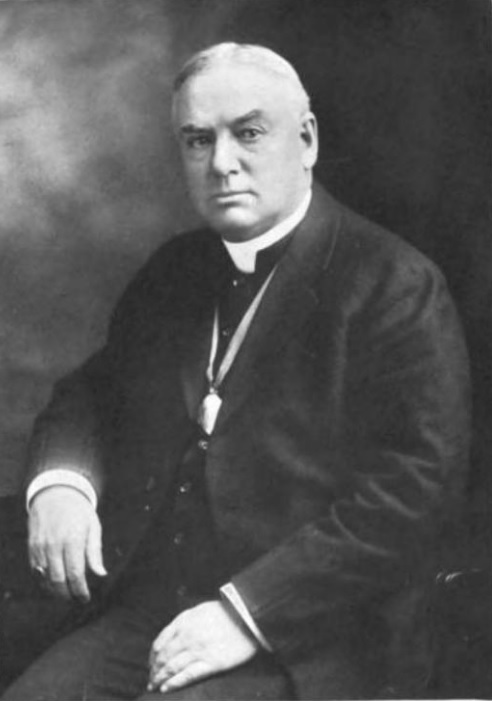
- Photo of Bishop Williams published in 1917
- Church: Episcopal Church
- Diocese: Nebraska
- Elected: May 1899
- In office: 1908–1919
- Predecessor: George Worthington
- Successor: Ernest Vincent Shayler
- Previous post: Coadjutor Bishop of Nebraska (1899-1908)

Orders
- Ordination: June 3, 1889 by John Franklin Spalding
- Consecration: October 18, 1899 by George Worthington

Personal details
- Born: January 30, 1856 Owen Sound, Ontario, Canada
- Died: January 29, 1919 (aged 62) Omaha, Nebraska, United States
- Denomination: Anglican (prev. Presbyterian)
- Parents: Richard J. Williams & Elizabeth Johnston
- Spouse: Adelaide L. Makinster (m. 1879)
- Children: 1

Arthur Llewellyn Williams (January 30, 1856 – January 29, 1919) was the third diocesan bishop of Nebraska in The Episcopal Church.

== Early life and education ==
Williams was born on January 30, 1856, in Owen Sound, Ontario, Canada, the son of the Reverend Richard Jones Williams, a Welsh Presbyterian minister, and Elizabeth Johnston. His mother died in 1857. In 1859, he moved with his father to settle in Sault Ste. Marie, Michigan. Williams attended high school in Shullsburg, Wisconsin, and then studied at the East Greenwich Academy in Rhode Island, graduating in 1877. He then worked in the mercantile business in Longmont, Colorado, and then with the Colorado, Utah and Pacific Railroad, at which time he joined the Episcopal Church. He entered the Western Theological Seminary in 1886, from where he earned a Bachelor of Sacred Theology in 1888, and a Doctor of Divinity in 1900. Williams married Adelaide L. Makinster on October 18, 1879.

== Ordained ministry ==
Williams was ordained deacon on May 22, 1888, and priest on June 3, 1889, by the Bishop of Colorado John Franklin Spalding, in St John's Cathedral, Denver. He served as missionary in White River City, Colorado between 1888 and 1891, and then as rector of St Paul's Church in Denver, Colorado between 1891 and 1892. In 1892, he became rector of Christ Church in Chicago, where he remained till 1899.

== Bishop ==
He was elected coadjutor bishop in May 1899 on the first ballot, over the opposition of those who called him a "ritualist" or too high church. He was consecrated on October 18, 1899, in Trinity Cathedral. Williams served in that capacity, and administered the diocese on behalf of the diocesan Bishop George Worthington who could no longer live in the diocese, till 1908. He died in office in 1919.
