= Little Italy, Omaha =

Neighborhood in Omaha, Nebraska, U.S.

Coordinates: 41°14′43″N 95°55′19″W

Little Italy is a neighborhood in Omaha, Nebraska, which served as the historic home to Omahans of Italian ancestry. It was the source of many laborers for the Union Pacific railroad, much of Omaha's bootlegging during Prohibition and the Santa Lucia Procession, which started in 1924 and continues annually.

The community is bounded by Pacific Street on the north, Center Street on the south, South 10th Street on the west and the Missouri River on the east. It is located immediately south of the Burlington Train Station and the Omaha Rail and Commerce Historic District.

In June 2008, the City of Omaha has announced plans to revitalize the area because of its proximity to Nebraska's top two tourist attractions, the Old Market District and the Henry Doorly Zoo. The plan calls for 10th Street to be improved with a streetcar line, treelines, parks, fountains and sculpture.

== History ==
Omaha's first Italian enclave developed during the 1890s near the intersection of South 24th Street and Poppleton Street. It was formed by immigrants from southern Italy and migrants from eastern American cities. Two brothers, Joseph and Sebastiano Salerno, are credited with creating Little Italy, located further north near the Union Pacific yards in downtown. When Sebastiano took a job as an agent for a steamship company in 1904, he encouraged friends from Sicily to emigrate. Joseph then secured boarding and jobs for the immigrants, particularly in downtown Omaha's Union Pacific shops. In 1905, Sicilian immigrants settled along South 6th Street in the hills south of downtown. Additional waves of Sicilians arrived between 1912 and 1913 and following World War I. South 10th Street was also particularly important to the Italian community.

Originally Little Italy had a small commercial area on South 6th Street extending west along Pierce Street, including a grocery store, clothing and shoe stores, and the Bank of Sicily, established by the Salerno brothers in 1908. The Immigration Act of 1924 was largely responsible for ending large-scale immigration of Italians to Omaha.

During the Prohibition era, much of the Omaha's bootleg liquor was produced in Little Italy. In 1930, Omaha city boss Tom Dennison placed Frank Calamia, a Sicilian living in the neighborhood, in charge of liquor syndicate operations in Omaha's south side. Later, from 1946 to 1951, Calamia controlled the local outlet of a national race wire service, distributed racing results received from the mob-controlled Harmony News Service in Kansas City. According to one expert, Little Italy native Tony Biase was the "leading Mafioso in Omaha" through the 1970s.

== Present ==
Today the Festival of Santa Lucia, which was started by Grazia Caniglia, is still celebrated throughout Little Italy, as it has been since the arrival of the first immigrants. An annual festival called "La Festa" is held to unite the city's Italian community and celebrate heritage. In addition to the historic Italian families in the area, today there are Latinos, Eastern Europeans and others throughout the community. Several new housing developments are happening throughout the area, as well. Many other remnants of Little Italy endure, making this area distinct within the city.

== Landmarks ==
Little Italy has several landmarks, including St. Francis Cabrini Church, designed by Thomas Rogers Kimball and built in 1908 at 1335 South 10th Street. The Cornish Residence is one of Omaha's best examples of Second Empire style architecture, and Santa Lucia Hall, which was originally built in 1891 as Fire Station 9. Other landmarks include the Santa Lucia Festival Committee Hall at 725 Pierce Street; Marino's Italian Grocery at 1716 South 13th Street; Sons Of Italy Hall located at 1238 South 10th Street, and; Orsi's Bakery at 621 Pacific Street. In 2007 Caniglia's was razed, and was replaced with townhomes.

== Notable residents ==
- Giuseppe Mario Bellanca
- Anthony J. Biase
- Joe Bubs
- Jeremy Caniglia
- Michele Pane
- Angelo Rossitto
- Pat Venditte
- Nelso Bartolomei

== See also ==
- History of Omaha

== Bibliography ==
- Venditte, P.L. (1983) The Americanization of the Italian-American Immigrants in Omaha, Nebraska. University of Nebraska - Lincoln
- Chudacoff, H. (1973) "A New Look At Ethnic Neighborhoods: Residential Dispersion and the Concept of Visibility in a Medium-Sized City." The Journal of American History. 60(1) pp. 76–93.
