= Bosque de Portugal =

Park in Curitiba, Brazil

Coordinates: 25°24′57″S 49°13′54″W

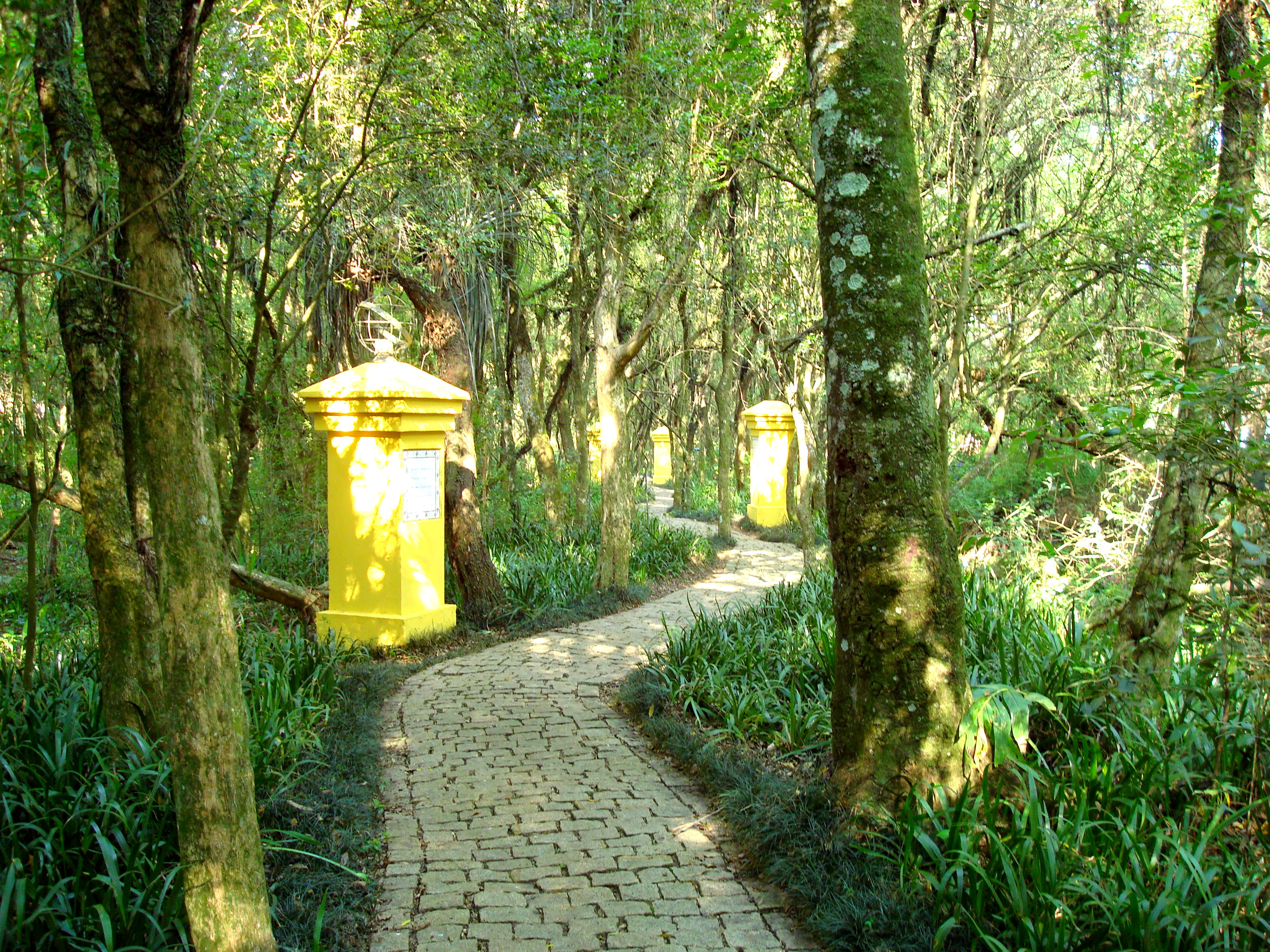
Bosque de Portugal

Bosque de Portugal is a public park located in the city of Curitiba, capital of the state of Paraná, Brazil.

== See also ==
- Curitiba
