= Bosque Alemão =

Coordinates: 25°24′22″S 49°17′08″W

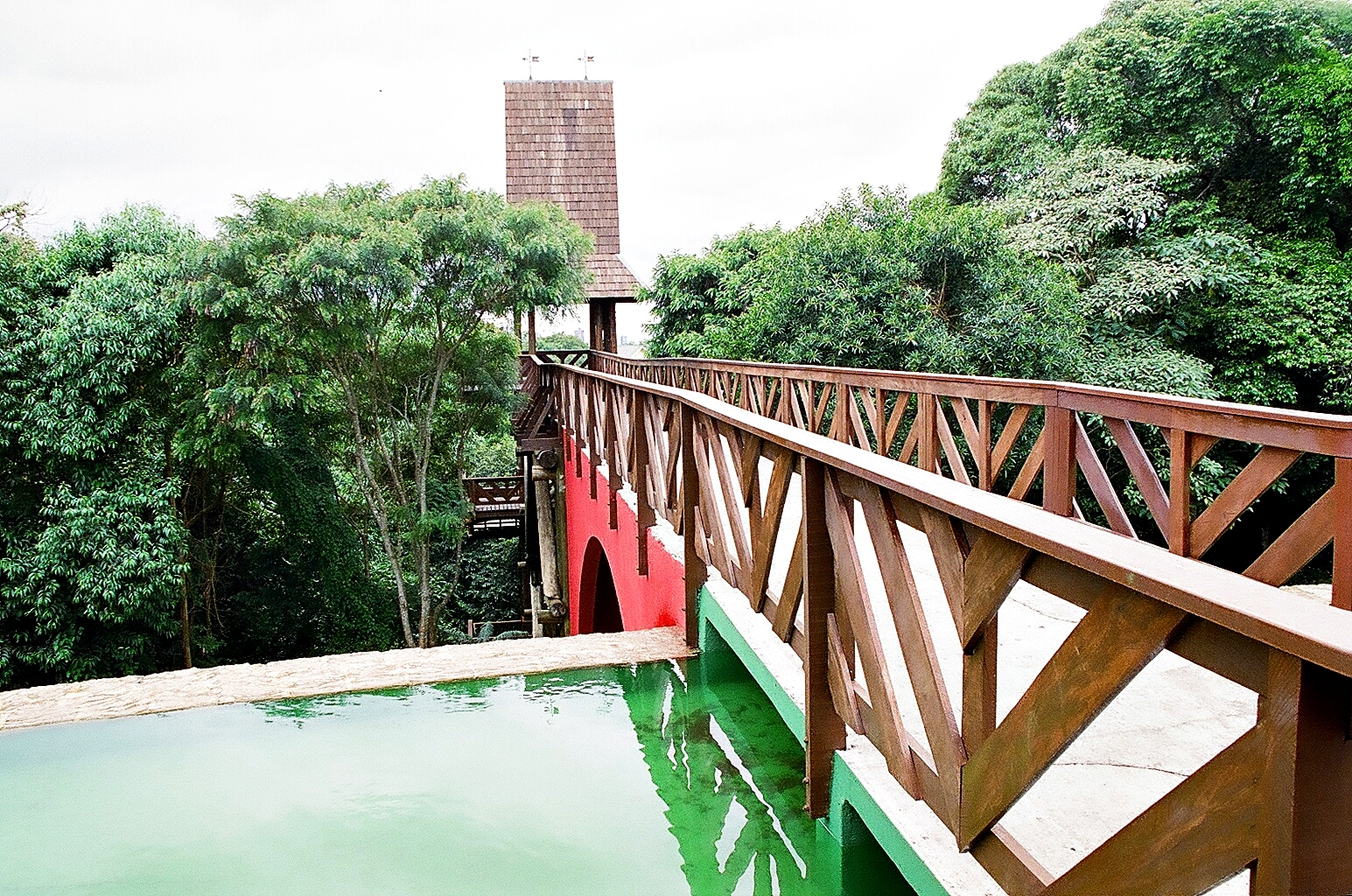
Torre dos Filósofos, Bosque Alemão

Bosque Alemão (meaning German Wood) is a park built in Curitiba in honor of the German immigrants who began to settle in the city in the early 19th century.

In the park visitors can walk on the trail of Hansel and Gretel (after the tale of Brothers Grimm) and reach the gingerbread and candy house, where usually on Saturday afternoons children listen to tales told by the crone that lives in the famous Brothers Grimm tale.

The park was inaugurated on 13 April 1996.
