= Anthony J. Biase =

American gangster (1909–1991)

Anthony Biase
- Born: Anthony Joseph Biase; September 6, 1909; Omaha, Nebraska, United States
- Died: September 21, 1991 (aged 82); Omaha, Nebraska, United States
- Occupation: Mobster
- Allegiance: Civella crime family

Anthony Joseph Biase (September 6, 1909 – September 21, 1991) was an American mobster who had a long career in gambling and narcotics, and was a caporegime of the Civella crime family's Omaha, Nebraska faction.

== Biography ==
He was born in Omaha and his rap sheet went back to 1922. It included several burglary and assault charges. Biase and his brother Benny owned a cigar store that served as a front for a bookmaking operation. During the 1930s, Biase was arrested on charges including bookmaking, burglary, and armed robbery. He eventually became involved in illegal gambling operations in San Francisco and Los Angeles, and later on mob-owned casinos in Las Vegas. Biase later became an associate of New York Genovese crime family boss Vito Genovese as he extended his criminal operations in the West.

In 1959, Anthony Marcella, boss of the Omaha organization, was convicted on charges of narcotics and tax evasion. Biase succeeded him as boss. In March 1960, Biase was indicted on several narcotics charges, based on information from Kenneth Bruce Sheetz, a minor drug dealer in his organization. In June 1960, Sheetz was ambushed and nearly killed by two members of the Omaha organization. It was rumored that Biase had ordered a $5,000 murder contract on him. In December 1960, Biase was convicted on the narcotics charges and sent to Leavenworth Federal Prison in Leavenworth, Kansas for 15 years.

Paroled in 1970, Biase maintained a low profile for the rest of his life. His only other arrest was a misdemeanor gambling charge in 1986.

On September 21, 1991, Anthony Biase died of natural causes in South Omaha, Nebraska.

== See also ==
- Little Italy (Omaha, Nebraska)
