= Iguaçu Park =

Park in Curitiba, Brazil

Coordinates: 25.5263°S 49.2234°W

Iguaçu Park is a park located in Curitiba, state of Paraná, Brazil
