= Joel N. Cornish House =

Historic house in Nebraska, United States

- Joel N.Cornish House
- U.S. National Register of Historic Places
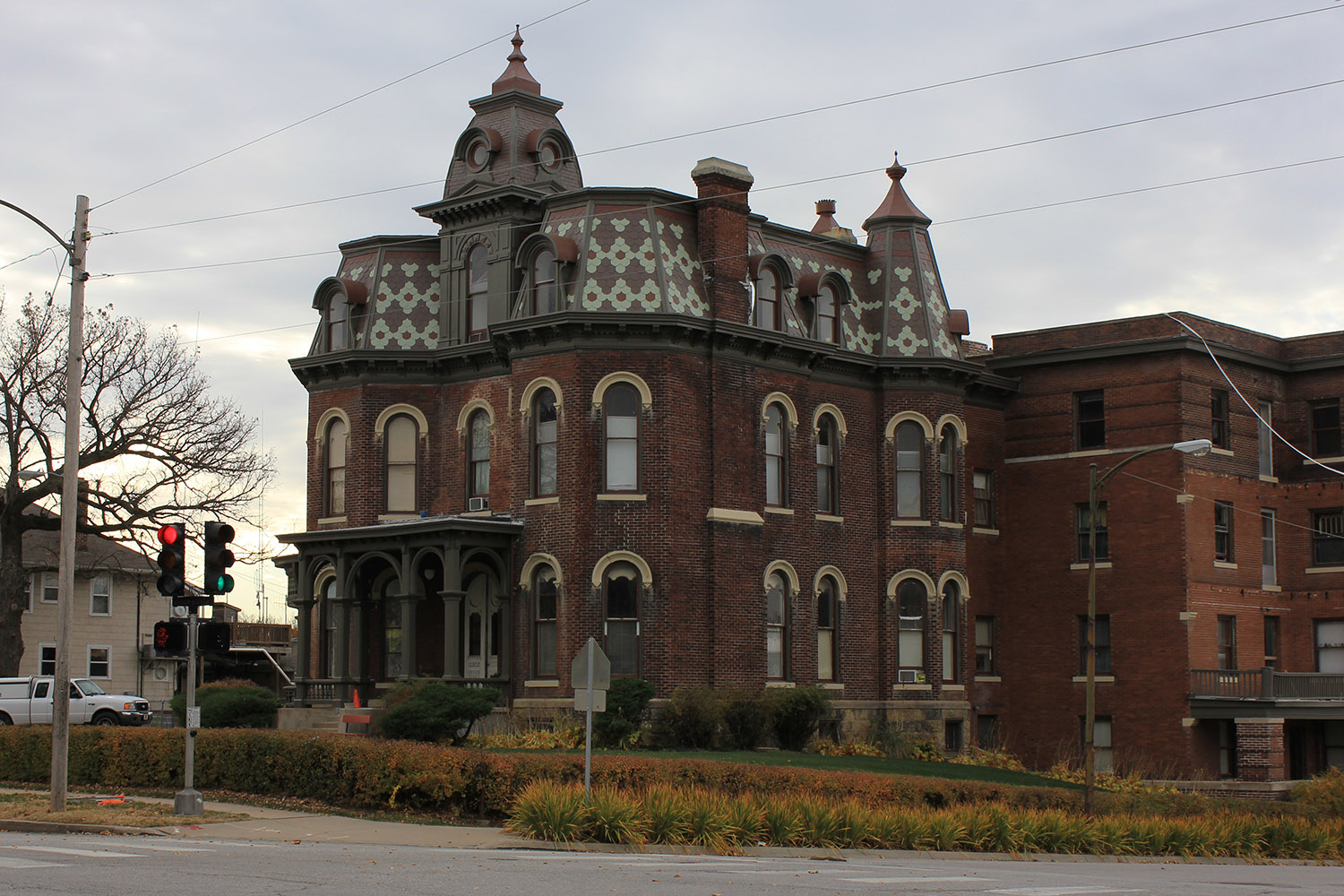

- Location within Nebraska Location within the United States
- Location: 1404 South 10th Street, Omaha, Nebraska
- Coordinates: 41°14′43.3″N 95°55′47.1″W
- Architectural style: Second Empire
- NRHP reference No.: 74001111
- Added to NRHP: August 13, 1974

The Joel N. Cornish House is located in South Omaha, Nebraska. The 1886 construction is considered an "excellent example of the French Second Empire style." The house was converted into apartments after the Cornish family moved out in 1911.

== Architecture ==
The house is a three-story mansion with a full basement with an addition constructed in 1911. The wooden roof consists of tongue and groove joint construction, with the floor made of mosaic tile. A broad central concrete stairway leads up to the front doors, and the exterior walls are load-bearing brick. The brick walls of the addition are broken up by small, evenly spaced, double hung windows in vertically parallel rows. The foundation is also brick, in places faced with rough-hewn sandstone blocks.

Two notable features of the house are the porches. The porch on the east facade is supported by triple wooden corner columns. The wooden porch on the south facade has been established as an original part of the building by a family photograph. Its ornate carving embellishes the tongue and groove joint construction in the floor and ceiling. French doors provided access to the house.

The slate mansard roof, with arched dormer windows is accentuated by cornices at its base and top. The slates are several different patterns set in rows of three; the central east facade of the roof is crowned by a wooden cupola with windows and a spire. Double-hung arched windows are arranged in horizontally and vertically parallel double rows equally spaced around the house. Two porches rise the entire height of the rectangular, three-story addition to the original house.

Several alterations have altered the original appearance of the exterior. Some of the changes include the removal of a wrought iron fence crowning the entire roof and the small roof of the cupola. A small balustrade that was once located above the east porch between the two bay windows of the second floor was removed, as well. Several onion-shaped ornaments no longer cap the dormer on the third story and the round windows in the roof of the cupola. Also, a small unornamented service porch on the south side of the southwest corner, has been removed, although the door still remains.

== History ==
In the late 1800s, the original "Gold Coast" area of Omaha lay south of the business district, roughly from Pierce to Dorcas between 8th & 11th Streets. Within the borders could be found the homes of many of Omaha's successful citizens. Much of the land which had once belonged to the estate of Adolph Kountze and had been subdivided into the Forrest Hills addition. It was here that Colonel Joel Northrop Cornish selected a site at 1404 South 10th Street for his home in Omaha. Colonel Cornish came to Omaha in 1886 from Hamburg, Iowa but he was an easterner by birth, and his mansion was to reflect much of that taste.

The Cornish house was built in a period when Omaha was witnessing an influx of cultured eastern families who brought with them wealth and professional skills. Homes in this period were often designed by eastern architects who transplanted design forms of European origins. They added American touches of more elaborate millwork in the exterior detailing. The almost pure French Second Empire Cornish house was such a structure, but the front veranda shows a clear manifestation of the American taste in residential architecture. Each member of the family had his own sitting room attached to his bedroom suite. The fifteen-room mansion with its thirteen-foot ceilings, beautiful floors bordered with parquet woodwork, and four fireplaces, was the showplace of an already elegant neighborhood. The third floor ballroom echoed with music and parties which included Henry Fonda.

Colonel Cornish died June 7, 1908, at the age of 82. The family continued to maintain the house for a while, but soon plans were drawn to convert the mansion to apartments. The huge kitchen with its pantries was partitioned off into smaller rooms. The first floors lavish rooms were converted into two separate apartments. Over the years an addition was constructed at the rear of the original home. There was no attempt to follow the style of the original architecture. The high ceilings in the main house were retained. the original Cornish house remained with the Cornish heirs until June 13, 1956, when Virginia Cornish Fischer sold it to Carl Meyers. On September 15, 1958, the house became the property of the Grace Bible Institute and is now used as apartments.
