= George Worthington (bishop) =

American bishop

The Right Reverend George Worthington D.D., LL.D.
- Bishop of Nebraska
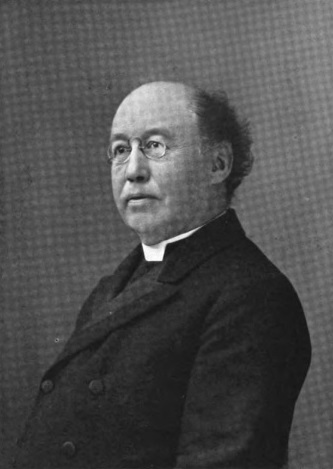
- Church: Episcopal Church
- Diocese: Nebraska
- Elected: November 1884
- In office: 1885–1908
- Predecessor: Robert Harper Clarkson
- Successor: Arthur Llewllyn Williams
- Other post: Bishop of the Convocation of Episcopal Churches in Europe (1907–1908)

Orders
- Ordination: January 29, 1865 by Horatio Potter
- Consecration: February 24, 1885 by Arthur Cleveland Coxe

Personal details
- Born: October 14, 1840 Lenox, Massachusetts, U.S.
- Died: January 7, 1908 (aged 67) Menton, France
- Denomination: Anglican

George Worthington (October 14, 1840 – January 7, 1908) was the second bishop of Nebraska in The Episcopal Church.

== Biography ==
Worthington was born in Lenox, Massachusetts, and as a youth moved to New York City. He worked as a bookkeeper for his uncle and later studied at Hobart College (now part of Hobart and William Smith Colleges), graduating with a Bachelor of Arts in 1860, and awarded a Doctor of Divinity in 1876, and a Doctor of Laws in 1885. He then studied at the General Theological Seminary, graduating in 1863.

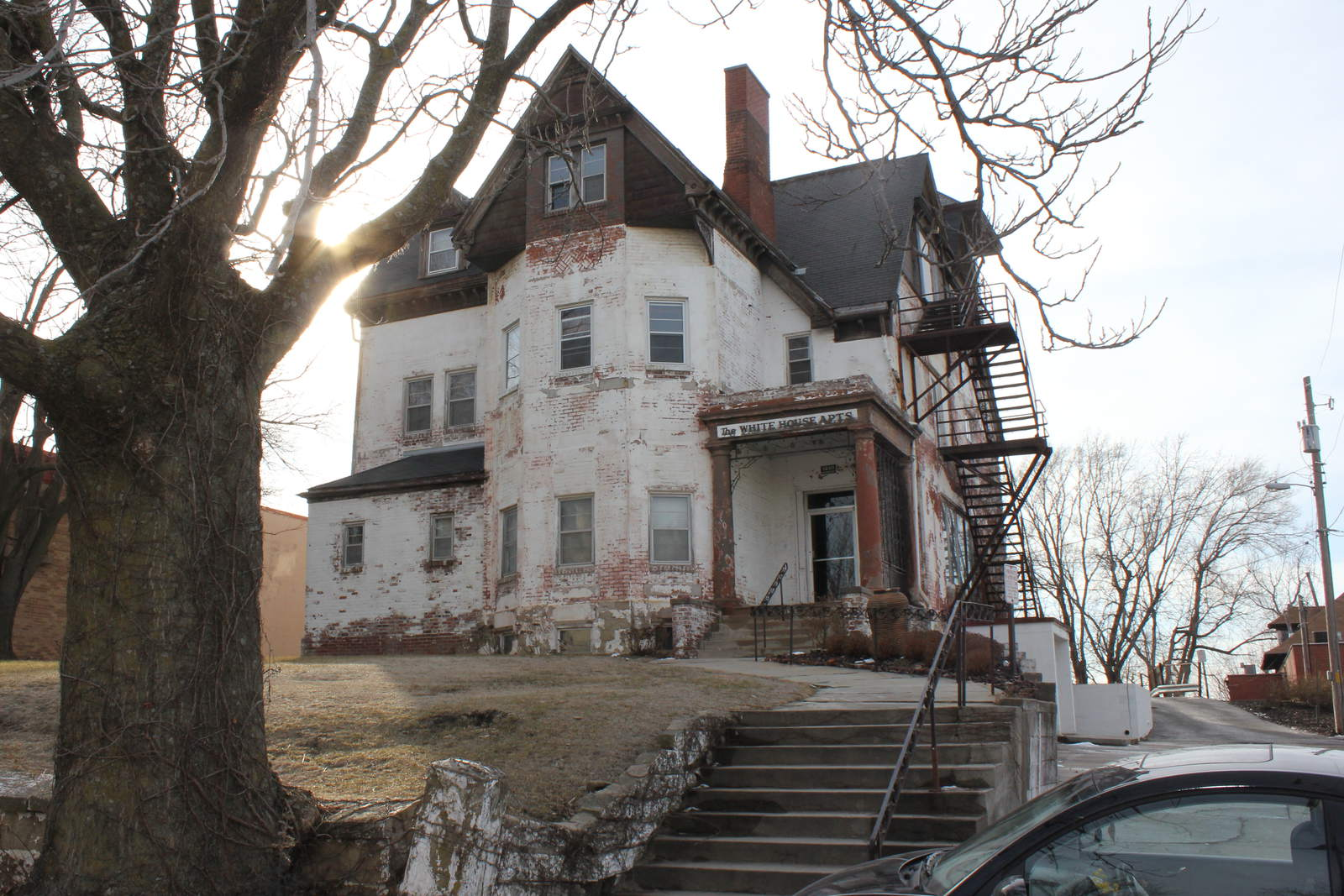
The Bishop Worthington Residence in Omaha

Worthington was ordained deacon in June 1863, and priest in 1865. He served as assistant at St Paul's Church in Troy, New York, and then became rector of Christ Church in Ballston Spa, New York. In 1868, he became rector of St. John's Church in Detroit. He remained there until 1885 when consecrated Bishop of Nebraska. While in Detroit he was at times the acting for the Bishop of Michigan. In 1883, he was elected as Missionary Bishop of Shanghai, however, he declined the election. Due to his heart condition, Worthington was unable to remain in the high altitude of Nebraska, and consequently moved to Pittsfield, Massachusetts, in 1890, while the diocese was administered by his coadjutor, and eventual successor, Arthur Llewllyn Williams. In May 1907, Worthington was appointed Bishop of the Convocation of Episcopal Churches in Europe, after which he moved to France.

He died suddenly in January 1908, as he was walking a street in Menton, France. His cause of death was due to heart disease. His body was identified by his wife a day later, as he had no identification papers at the time of his death.
