= Brownell-Talbot School =

Coordinates: 41°15′51″N 95°59′55″W

Brownell Talbot College Preparatory School
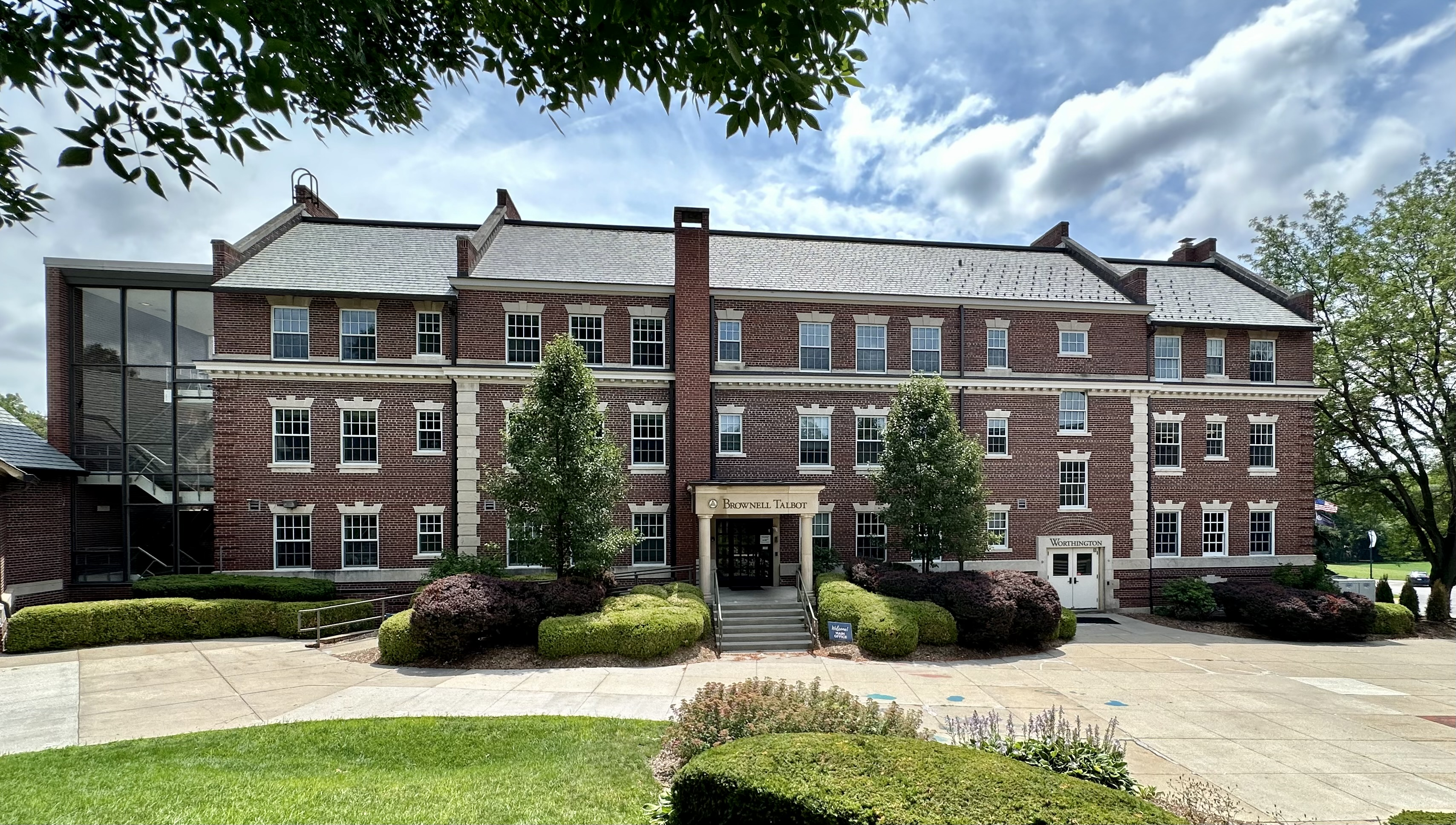
- Omaha, Nebraska; United States

Information
- Type: Independent
- Motto: "We are BT"
- Established: September 17, 1863
- Headmaster: Kristi N. Gibbs
- Grades: Preschool through grade 12
- Enrollment: 435
- Colors: Blue and gold
- Team name: Raiders
- Website: www.brownell.edu

Brownell Talbot College Preparatory School is an independent, co-educational, college preparatory day school located in Omaha, Nebraska, United States. It serves students from preschool through grade 12.

== History ==
In the mid-19th century, Omaha joined progressive cities that were establishing schools for girls' education. The Episcopal Church founded Brownell Hall, an all-girls secondary boarding school three miles north of Omaha in Saratoga. It officially opened on September 17, 1863. Located at present-day 400 North Happy Hollow, this private religious school was named after an Episcopal bishop of Connecticut, and was first located in the Saratoga Springs Hotel, a defunct resort. Students came to the school from Nebraska City, Bellevue, Florence, Fontanelle, Decatur and Omaha. The school moved to 16th and Jones in 1867, and in 1883 to 10th Street in downtown Omaha. In 1923 it moved to a central Omaha location. It became co-educational in 1963, ending 100 years of boarding girls. In 1968, the school became independent, breaking its ties with the Episcopal Church. Today it is the oldest school in continuous operation in Nebraska.

== Chapel ==
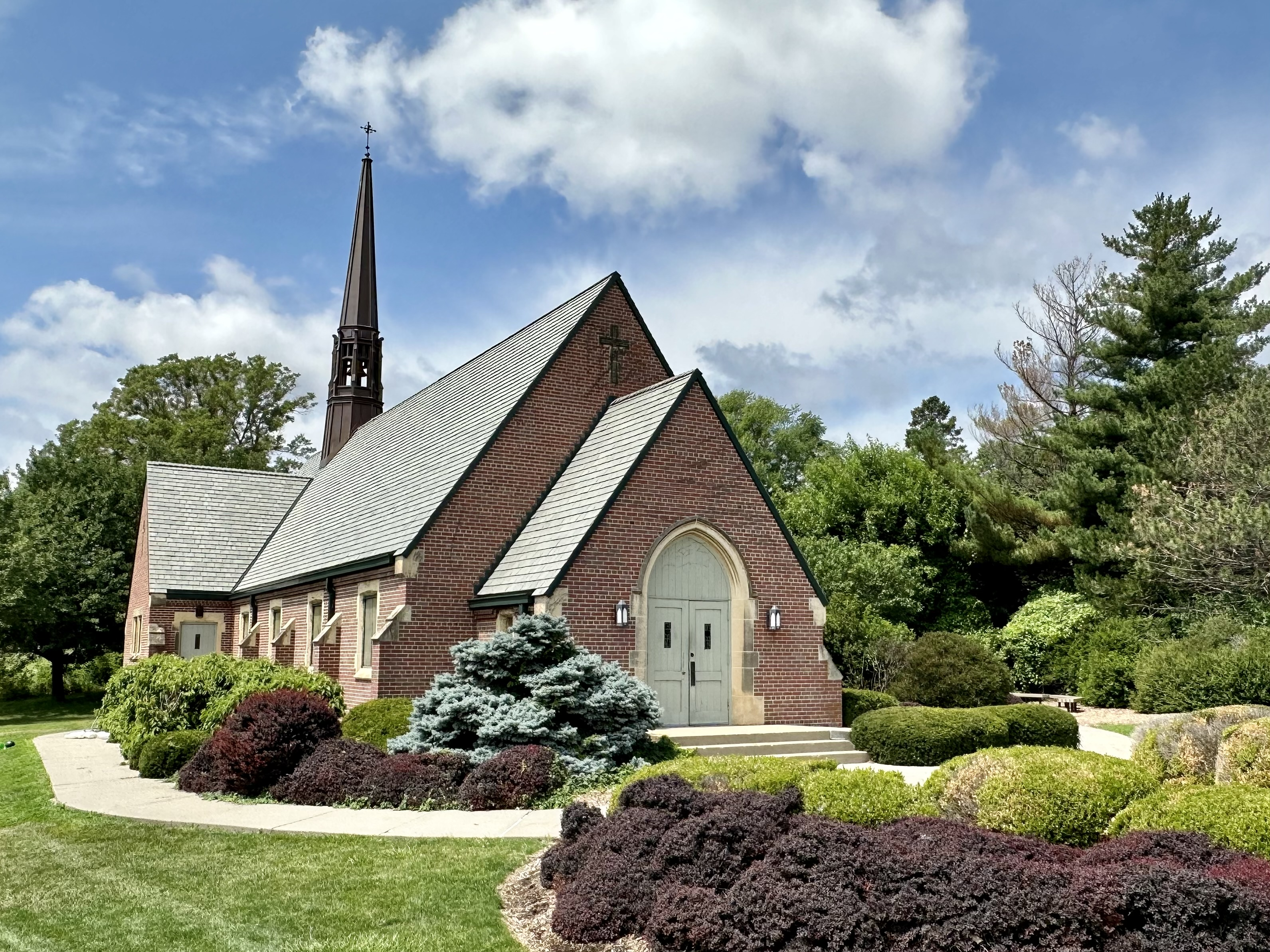
The Brownell Talbot School Chapel

== Theater ==
Brownell Talbot students performed an original musical at the Fringe Festival in Edinburgh, Scotland, in 2024.

== Notable alumni ==
- Edith Abbott, economist, social worker, educator, and author
- Mellona Moulton Butterfield, china painter and teacher
- Zibby Oneal, author
- Chris Ware, graphic novelist
- John Watson, chess master and author

== See also ==
- History of Omaha
- Education in Omaha, Nebraska
