= St. Matthias' Episcopal Church (Omaha, Nebraska) =

- U.S. National Register of Historic Places
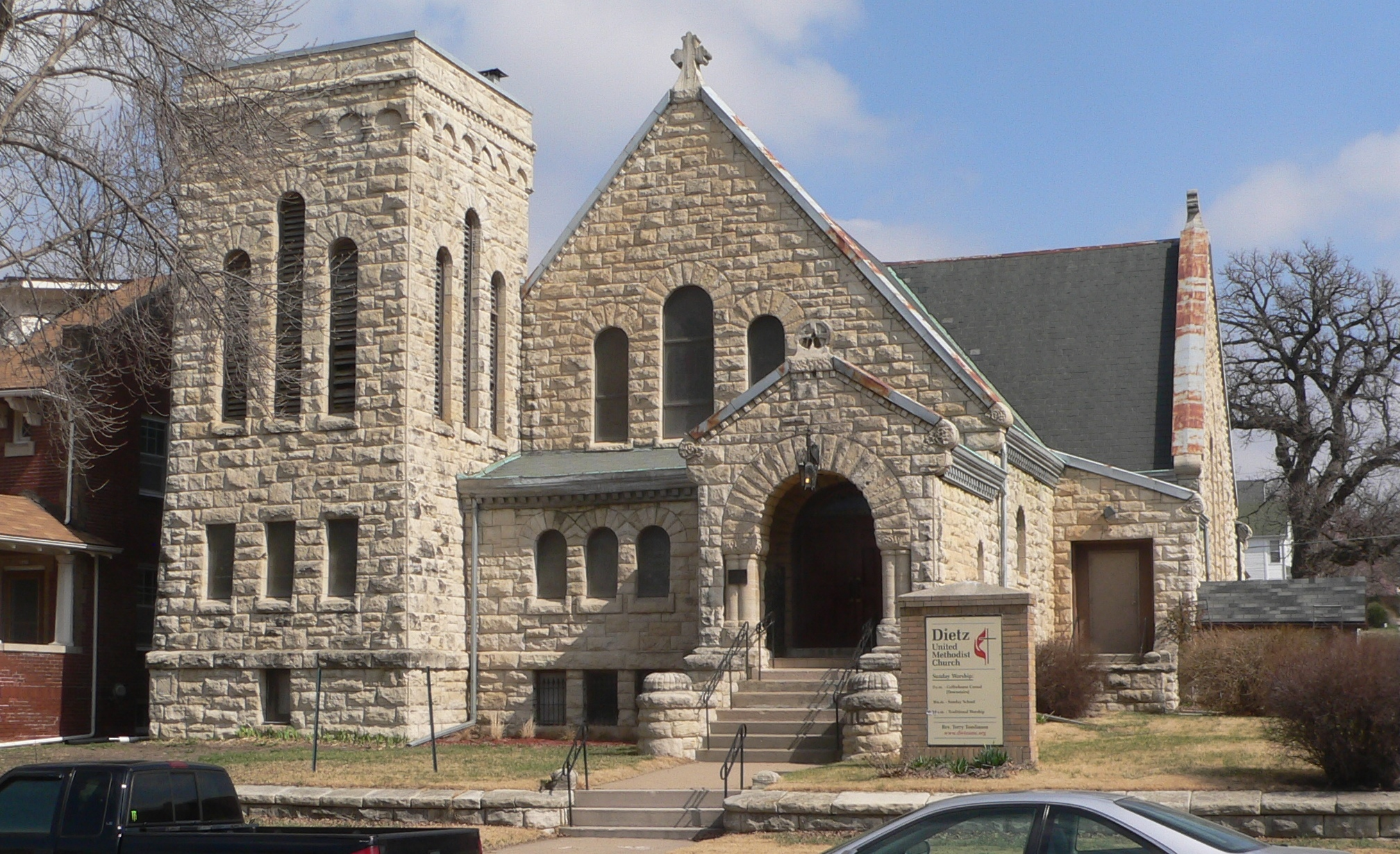
- The church in 2012

- Location within Nebraska Location within the United States
- Location: 1423 South 10th Street, Omaha, Nebraska
- Coordinates: 41°14′41″N 95°55′44″W
- Area: less than one acre
- Built: 1888
- Architect: John H.W. Hawkins
- Architectural style: Romanesque Revival, Gothic Revival
- NRHP reference No.: 80002450
- Added to NRHP: November 23, 1980

Former St. Matthias' Episcopal Church, now known as the Dietz United Methodist Church, is a historic church in Omaha, Nebraska, United States. It was built in 1888 for the Episcopal Church, and designed in the Romanesque Revival and Gothic Revival styles by architect John H.W. Hawkins. It was acquired by the United Methodist Church in 1920. It has been listed on the National Register of Historic Places since November 23, 1980.
