= Architecture in Omaha, Nebraska =

Architecture in Omaha, Nebraska, represents a range of cultural influences and social changes occurring from the late 19th century to present.

== Background ==
The area comprising modern-day North Omaha is home to a variety of important examples of popular turn-of-the-20th-century architecture, ranging from Thomas Rogers Kimball's Spanish Renaissance Revival-style St. Cecilia Cathedral at 701 N. 40th Street to the Prairie School style of St. John's A.M.E. Church designed by Frederick S. Stott at 2402 N. 22nd Street. A young African American architect under Kimball's guidance was Clarence W. Wigington, who designed the Broomfield Rowhouse and Zion Baptist Church. Wigington moved to St. Paul, Minnesota where he became the city's senior municipal architect. In that capacity he designed hundreds of important civic buildings throughout that city, leaving an indelible mark on architecture across the Midwestern United States. The firm of Mendelssohn, Fisher and Lawrie was very influential in early Omaha, designing dozens of significant buildings throughout the city.

Notable figures in the history of Omaha architecture include John Latenser, Sr., a Liechtenstein-born immigrant; Byron Reed and A.J. Poppleton, early real estate moguls in the city; and Thomas Rogers Kimball and his student Clarence W. Wigington. Other early architects in the city included Charles F. Beindorf, who designed the old City Hall; Frederick W. Clarke, who designed Vinton School; and Jacob Nachtigall;

=== Public works ===
Notable public architecture in Omaha
Name	Location	Notes
Fort Omaha Historic District		Italianate-style
Prettiest Mile in Omaha Boulevard		Later renamed Florence Boulevard
Kountze Park		Site of the Trans-Mississippi Exposition, all the buildings here were designed in Grecian and Roman Revival styles and were demolished soon after the event.
Technical High School		Tech was the largest school west of Chicago when it was built.
North High School		

=== Commercial enterprises ===
Notable commercial architecture in Omaha
Name	Location	Notes
Bank of Florence	8502 N. 30th Street	A Greek Revival-style building built between 1850 and 1874.
Jewell Building	2221-2225 N. 24th Street	A Georgian Revival-style commercial building built between 1900 and 1949.
Webster Telephone Exchange Building	2213 Lake Street	A Jacobethan Revival style commercial building built in 1907.
Omaha Star building		A 1923 Commercial style building housing the Omaha Star since 1938.

=== Private residences ===
Notable residential architecture in Omaha
Name	Location	Notes
Dr. Samuel Mercer House	3920 Cuming Street	A Queen Anne Style house built between 1875 and 1924.
George H. Kelly House	1924 Binney Street	A Classical Revival house built between 1900 and 1924.
Havens-Page House	101 N. 39th Street	A house built between 1900 and 1924 in the styles of the late 19th and 20th Century Revivals. Listed on the National Register of Historic Places.
Strehlow Terrace	2024 and 2107 N. Sixteenth Street	An apartment complex built in mixed Bungalow, American Craftsman, Classical Revival, and Prairie School styles between 1900 and 1924.
Keirle House	3017 Mormon Street	A classic box style house built in 1905.
Harry Buford House	1804 North 30th Street	Built in 1929 in the Period Revival-Style.
John P. Bay House	2024 Binney Street	Built in 1887 in the Queen Anne-style.
Joseph Garneau Jr./Thomas Kilpatrick House	3100 Chicago Street	Built in 1890 in the Romanesque Revival style.
Melrose Apartments	602 North 33rd Street	Built in 1916.
Saunders School	415 North 41st Avenue	Built in 1899 in the Neoclassical Revival-style.
George F. Shepard House	1802 Wirt Street	A Queen Anne Style/Beaux Arts-style built in 1903.
Sherman Apartments	2501 North 16th Street	A Neoclassical Revival-style apartment building built in 1897 located at .
Charles Storz House	1901 Wirt Street	An Arts and Crafts-style home built in 1909.
Broomfield Rowhouse	2502-2504 Lake Street	Designed by master architect Clarence Wigington in 1913 from Wigington's 1909 Good Housekeeping award-winning blueprints.

=== Religious institutions ===
There are several notable Christian churches in North Omaha. They include Calvin Memorial Presbyterian Church, located at 3105 North 24th Street. Formerly known at North Presbyterian Church, the City of Omaha reports, "Calvin Memorial Presbyterian Church is architecturally significant to Omaha as a fine example of the Neo-Classical Revival Style of architecture, taking formal inspiration from several buildings of the 1898 Trans-Mississippi and International Exposition that had been held nearby."

Holy Family Church was built at the intersections of 18th and Izard Streets in 1883 for North Omaha's Irish immigrants. Over the years it served Czech and Italian immigrants, and today is targeted at the city's African American Catholics. The building is listed on the National Register of Historic Places, along with St. John's African Methodist Episcopal Church.

Formed in 1880, St. John's was built in 1921 in the Prairie style. An auditorium extension was added to the building in 1947, and auxiliary rooms were finished in 1956. Designed by Omaha architect Frederick S. Stott, the building reflects a progressive attitude on the part of this black congregation at a time when traditional values in religious architecture were prevalent.

== Notable architects ==
Notable historical architects in Omaha
Name	Years active	Notes
Thomas Rogers Kimball	1906 to 1936	Designed the St. Cecelia's Cathedral, Burlington Headquarters Building, Burlington Train Station, Hotel Fontenelle, Mary Rogers Kimball House , Monmouth Park School, and Nash Block
Clarence W. Wigington	1898 to 1915 in Omaha	Designed the Broomfield Rowhouse, Zion Baptist Church and others
Mendelssohn, Fisher and Lawrie	1887 to 1931	Later known as Fisher and Lawrie. Notable designs include Broatch Building, Mason School, Minne Lusa Pumping Station, and Hicks Terrace
John Latenser	1887 to 1931	Later known as Latenser and Sons. Notable designs include Omaha Central High School, Douglas County Courthouse and J. L. Brandeis and Sons Store
John McDonald	1887 to 1950	Joined with son Alan McDonald until 1947. Notable designs include Joslyn Art Museum, Faidley Building (demolished), Joslyn Castle, Beth El Synagogue, Bradford-Pettis House, and Hill Hotel

== Notable former structures ==
Former notable locations in Omaha
Name	Location	Notes
Bee Building	17th and Farnam	Built in 1888 and demolished in 1966, along with the Old City Hall.
Minne Lusa Pumping Station	Located at the Florence Waterworks	Completed in 1889, this building was demolished in 1970.
Gerald R. Ford birthsite	3202 Woolworth Avenue	Ford was born in 1913 and his mother relocated with him to another state soon after. The house was demolished in 1971.
Hotel Fontenelle	1806 Douglas Street	Designed by Thomas Rogers Kimball and built in 1914, it was demolished in 1983.
Indian Hills Theater	78th and Dodge Streets	Built in 1962, this was the largest and last Super-Cinerama in the U.S.
Jefferson Square	Bounded by 15th, 16th, Farnam and Douglas Streets	Dedicated November 25, 1865, it was razed by the city March 18, 1969. The first park in Omaha, it was also the location of the first school and hot air balloon in Omaha.
Jobbers Canyon	Bound by Farnam Street, South Eighth Street, Jackson Street, and South Tenth Street.	Built up from the 1860s, the entirety of the area was demolished in 1989.
Krug Park	2936 North 52nd Street	Originally opened in 1895, the amusement park was bought by Frederick Krug in 1902 and became the site of the nation's worst roller coaster accident in 1930. It was redeveloped as a traditional public park in 1955.
Malcolm X birthplace	3448 Pinkney Street	Malcolm Little was born in 1925, and his family moved away soon after. The house was demolished in 1965 before the owners knew about its connection to his life.
Old Post Office	16th and Dodge Streets	Built in 1898, the building was demolished in 1966.
Old City Hall	18th and Farnam Streets.	Completed in 1890, the building was demolished 1966.
Peony Park	78th and Cass Streets	This amusement park was opened in 1920 and demolished in 1996.

== See also ==
- History of North Omaha, Nebraska
- Landmarks in North Omaha, Nebraska
