= Ford Warehouse =

- U.S. National Register of Historic Places
- Location: Downtown Omaha, Nebraska
- Coordinates: 41°15′36″N 95°55′48″W
- Built: 1919
- Architect: John Latenser, Sr.
- Architectural style: Renaissance Revival
- NRHP reference No.: 99000423
- Added to NRHP: April 1st, 1999

The Ford Warehouse, also known as the Simon Brothers Building, is located at 1024 Dodge Street in Downtown Omaha, Nebraska. It is a six-story brick and stone building constructed in 1919 and was added to the National Register of Historic Places in 1999. It is located near the Omaha Rail and Commerce Historic District and the site of the former Jobbers Canyon Historic District, and is three blocks from the Old Market Historic District. Additionally, the building is also in accordance with the patterns for significance detailed in the Warehouses in Omaha Multiple Property Submission.

== About ==
The building functioned as a multi-use facility leasing space to a variety of other commercial tenants, including the B.F. Goodrich Rubber Company, United Food Stores, Inc., Warren Oil Company, Ford Brothers Van and Storage Company, and Gooches Food Products Company. It was the Ford Brothers Van and Storage Company that the building became known for.

== See also ==
- History of Omaha, Nebraska
- History of Nebraska
