= John Latenser Sr. =

American architect

- Born: Johann Laternser; 1858; Nendeln, Liechtenstein
- Died: 1936 (aged 77–78); Omaha, Nebraska
- Occupation: Architect
- Children: John Jr., Frank

John Latenser Sr. (1858–1936) was an American architect whose influential public works in Omaha, Nebraska, numbered in the dozens. His original name was Johann Laternser.

Many of the buildings Latenser designed, including public and private, are included on the National Register of Historic Places. In the 1930s 89 out of 98 blocks in Downtown Omaha contained at least one building designed by Latenser and Sons. Latenser designed more than a dozen buildings that are currently included on the National Register of Historic Places.

== Biography ==
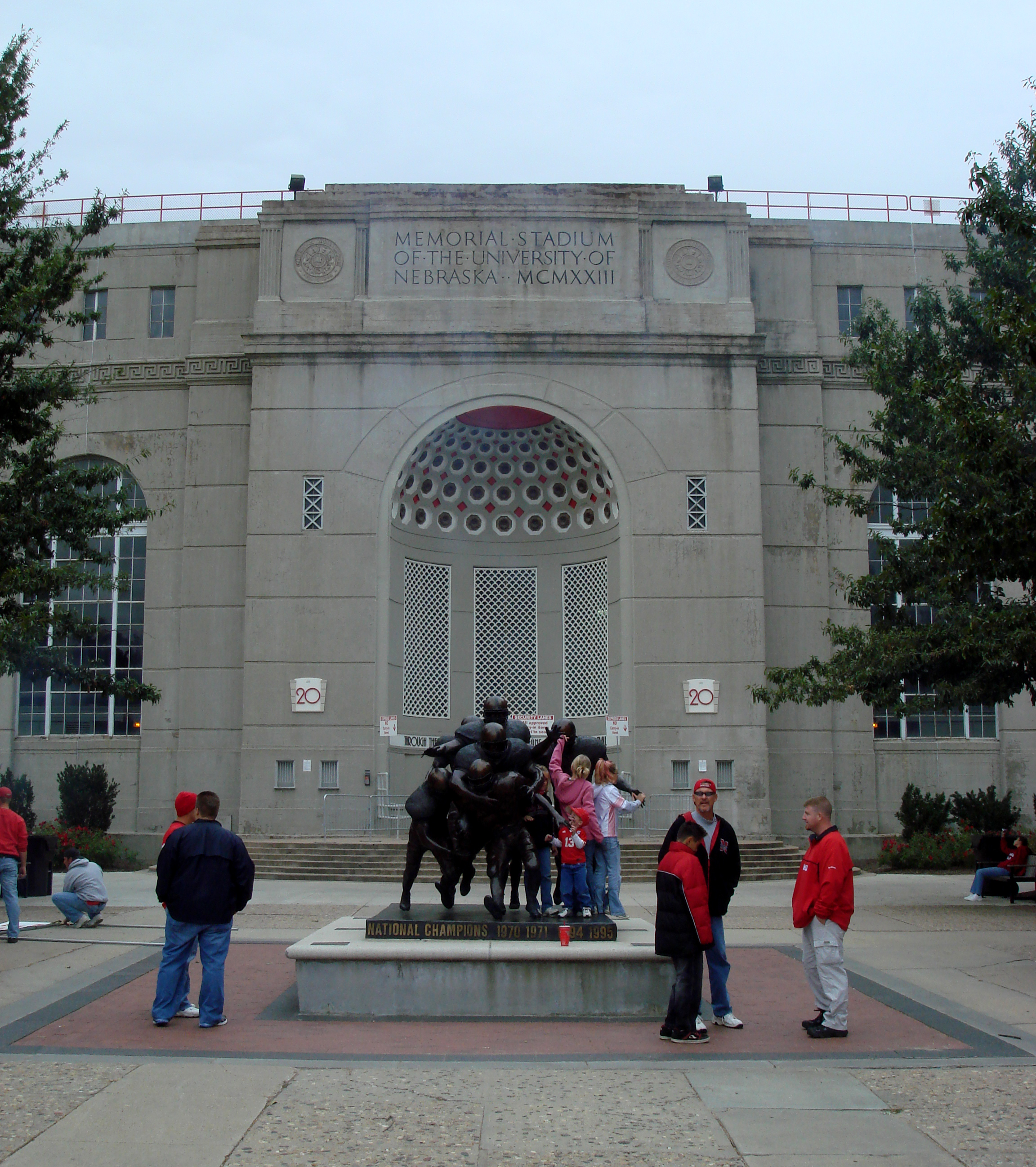
The eastern façade of the Latenser-designed Memorial Stadium in Lincoln.

Born in Nendeln, Liechtenstein, to a family of people in the construction business, Latenser studied architecture at the Polytechnic College in Stuttgart, Germany, which is now the University of Stuttgart. After 1873 he took a job as a caretaker in his brother Heinrich’s business in what is now Strasbourg, France, at that time Strassburg, provincial capital of the German province of Alsace-Lorraine. It is not known precisely when he immigrated to the United States.

He worked as a draftsman in Chicago, Illinois, for seven years before starting his own architectural firm in Omaha, Nebraska, in 1887. Latenser became staff architect for the Omaha School District in 1892 and was responsible for the design of at least 20 of the city's public school facilities. His sons, John Jr. and Frank, later joined him in this firm, Latenser & Sons, which designed several prominent buildings in the Midwestern United States.

== Career ==
Many of Latenser's works are still standing today and include the Douglas County Courthouse, the Omaha Central High School, Long School, Saunders School, Columbian School, and the Center School buildings, the Keeline Building, the Eggerss-O'Flyng Building in Omaha and the Blair High School building in Blair, Nebraska. These and many other buildings Latenser designed are listed on the United States National Register of Historic Places.

Other notable works are at the University of Nebraska–Lincoln, where he was responsible for designing the Temple building, a nursing dormitory at the Medical School, and the Memorial Stadium, as well as the Schulte Field House. Latenser also designed several buildings in Omaha's historic districts, including the South Omaha Main Street Historic District and the now-demolished Jobbers Canyon Historic District.

Notable designs by John Latenser Sr. alphabetical order
Name	Built	Location	Notes
Blair High School	1899	Blair, Nebraska	
Brandeis Building	1906	210 South 16th Street, Omaha, Nebraska	This Downtown Omaha building was listed on NRHP in 1982.
Carnegie Library	1906	Hastings, Nebraska	Demolished in 1962.
Center School	1893	1730 South 11th Street, Omaha, Nebraska	This South Omaha building was listed on the NRHP in 1985.
Columbian School	1892	3819 Jones Street, Omaha, Nebraska	This Midtown Omaha building was listed on the NRHP in 1990.
Douglas County Courthouse	1912	1700 Farnam Street, Omaha, Nebraska	Five years after being built this downtown building was almost destroyed by a mob. It was listed on the NRHP in 1979.
Eggerss-O'Flyng Building	1902–1928	801 South 15th Street, Omaha, Nebraska	This downtown building was listed on the NRHP in 1991. Latenser designed the fourth addition to the building in 1928.
Federal Building	1927	1709 Jackson Street, Omaha, Nebraska	Originally designed to house the Omaha Bee-News, a property of William Randolph Hearst, this building subsequently served as home to several federal offices downtown.
Ford Warehouse	1919	1024 Dodge Street, Omaha, Nebraska	Located in downtown, this building was listed on the NRHP in 1999.
J.F. Bloom & Co. Building	1910	1702 Cuming Street, Omaha, Nebraska	Originally built to house a gravestone maker, the building underwent a $1.6 million redevelopment effort in 2015.
Keeline Building	1911	319 South 17th Street, Omaha, Nebraska	
Mercantile Storage Building	1920	1013 Jones Street, Omaha, Nebraska	Located in the Old Market, this building was to the NRHP in 1996.
Omaha Athletic Club	1918	1714 Douglas Street, Omaha, Nebraska	A widely acknowledged masterpiece that was razed in 1992 for the site of the Roman L. Hruska Federal Courthouse.
Omaha Central High School	1900–1912	124 North 20th Street, Omaha, Nebraska	The oldest high school building in Omaha is located downtown, and was listed on the NRHP in 1979.
Pacific School	1868	1120 Pacific Street, Omaha, Nebraska	After replacing Omaha's first school, the decision to demolish the building in 1929 was protested throughout the city.
Parlin, Orendorff and Martin Plow Company Building	1909	714-716 South 10th Street, Omaha, Nebraska	Also known as the Butternut Building, this is a contributing property to the Omaha Rail and Commerce Historic District.
Rialto Theater	1915	1424 Douglas Street	Originally featuring an octagonal seating pattern for 2200 seats, this theater included a bowling alley on the second floor and was demolished.
Sanford Hotel	1916	1913 Farnam Street, Omaha, Nebraska	Located downtown, this building was listed on the NRHP.
Saunders School	1900	415 North 41st Avenue, Omaha, Nebraska	This Midtown building was listed on the NRHP in 1986.
St. John's Greek Orthodox Church	1908	602 Park Avenue, Omaha, Nebraska	This Midtown landmark was originally the second building housing Omaha's Temple Israel. Also called the Park Avenue Synagogue, it was sold to St. John's in 1951.
St. Peter Catholic Church	1926	709 South 28th Street, Omaha, Nebraska	This building's five-aisled, no-pillar nave are unique for this period.
Scottish Rite Cathedral	1912	202 South 20th Street, Omaha, Nebraska	Known today as the Omaha Scottish Rite Masonic Center, the building stands today.

== See also ==
- Thomas Rogers Kimball
- Architecture in Omaha, Nebraska
- Architecture in North Omaha, Nebraska
- List of public schools in Omaha, Nebraska
- Omaha Landmarks
- Eugene C. Eppley Administration Building
