= Casiville Bullard House =

Historic house in Minnesota, United States

- U.S. National Register of Historic Places
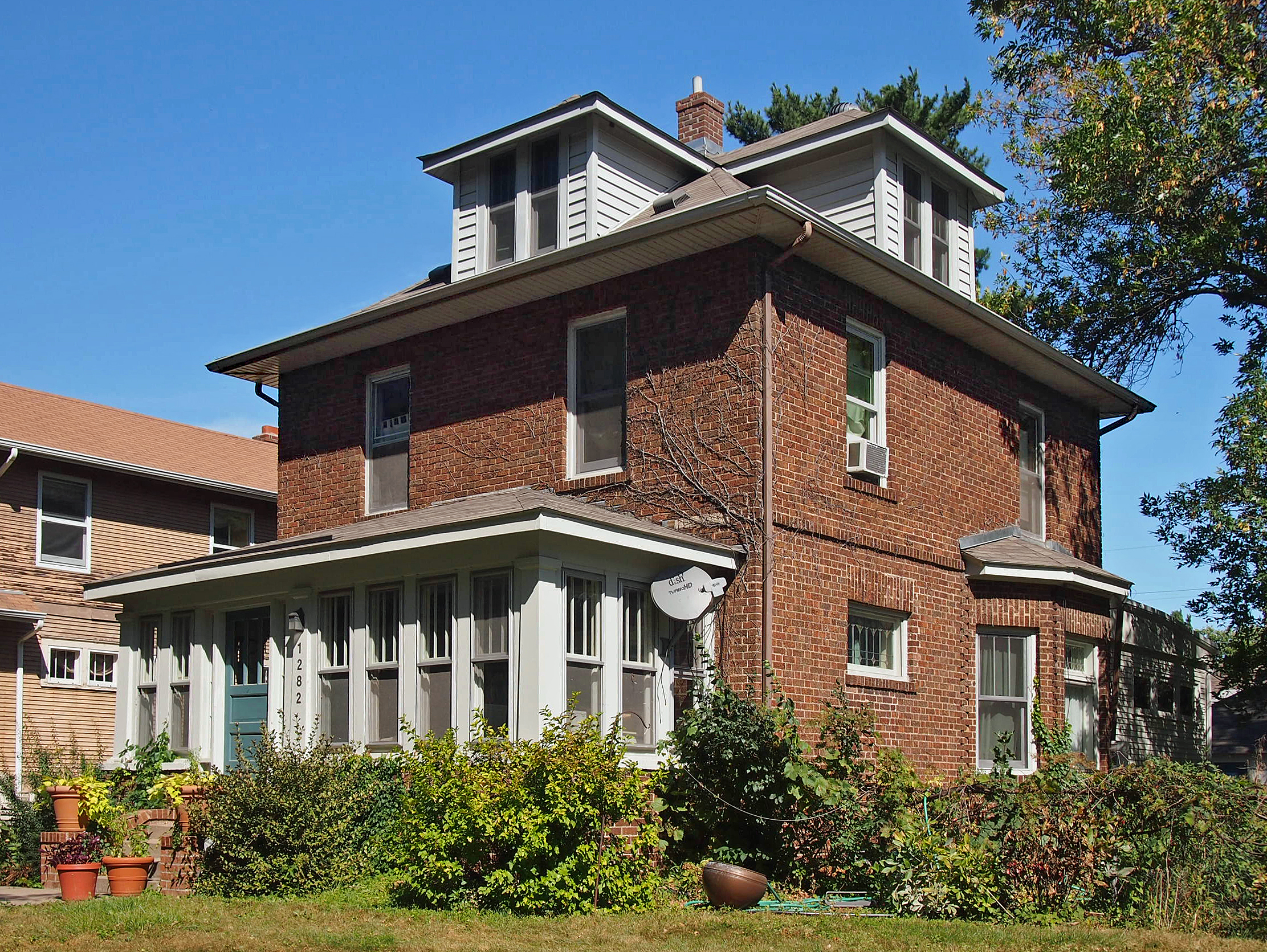
- The Casiville Bullard House viewed from the southwest

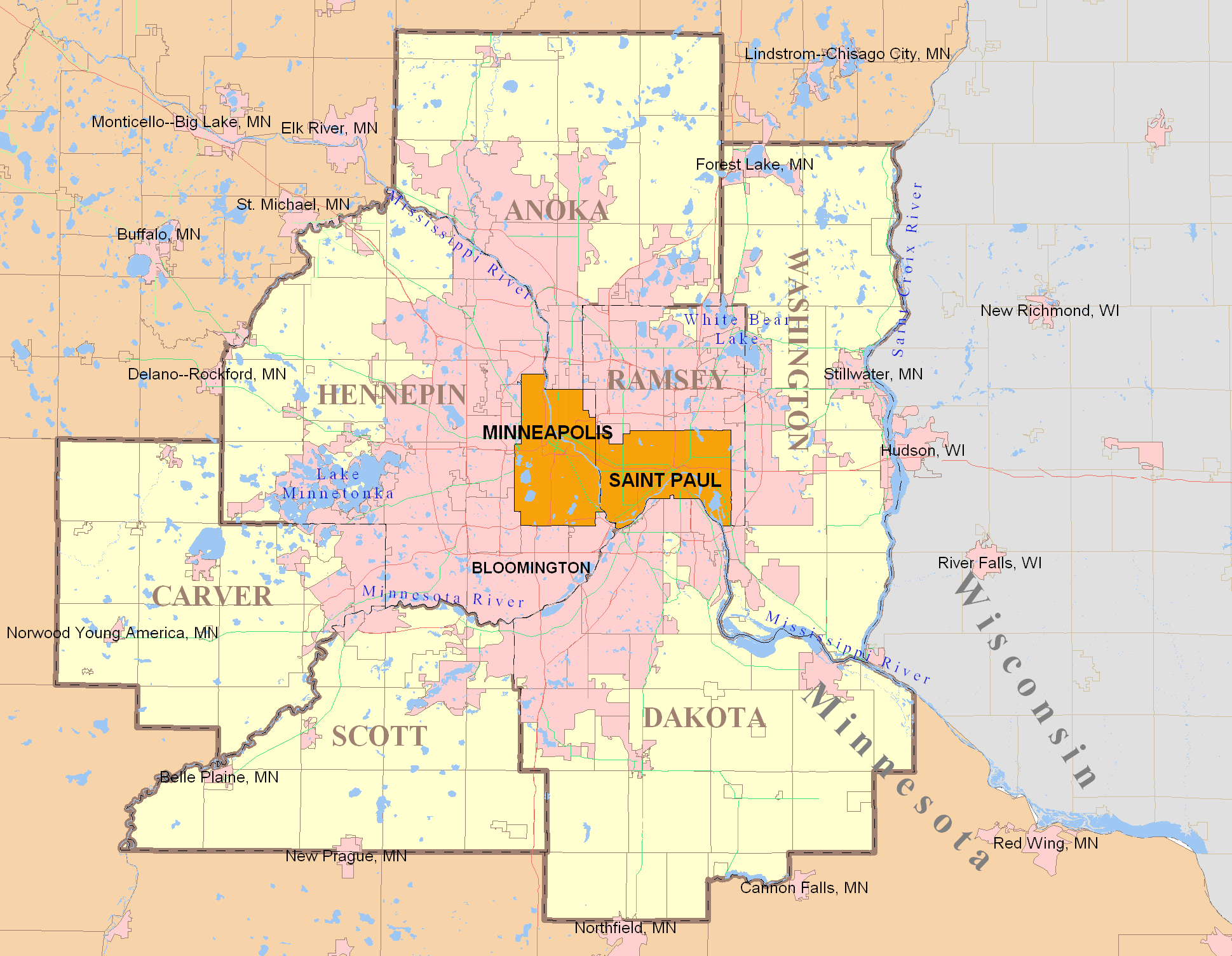
- Location within Minneapolis–Saint Paul Location within Minnesota Location within the United States
- Location: 1282 Folsom Street, Saint Paul, Minnesota
- Coordinates: 44°58′47.8″N 93°7′56.7″W
- Area: Less than one acre
- Built: 1909–1910
- Built by: Casiville Bullard
- Architectural style: American Foursquare
- NRHP reference No.: 96001559
- Added to NRHP: January 9, 1997

The Casiville Bullard House is a historic house in Saint Paul, Minnesota, United States. It was built from 1909 to 1910 by stonemason and bricklayer Casiville Bullard (1873–1959), one of the few known African-American skilled workers active in the building trades in early-20th-century Saint Paul. The house was listed on the National Register of Historic Places in 1997 for its local significance in the themes of black history and social history.

== History ==
Casiville "Charlie" Bullard was born on February 24, 1873, in Memphis, Tennessee. His parents were former slaves who worked on cotton plantations. As the eldest of seven children, Bullard spent much of his youth picking cotton with his parents and babysitting his younger siblings. Although he only received a third-grade education, a male relative gave him instruction in building trades such as stonemasonry, bricklaying, and plastering. During the era of slavery in the United States, enslaved African Americans were often forced to repair and maintain buildings and to make clothing, on top of being forced to perform agricultural labor. As a result, many individuals became proficient in spinning, weaving, shoemaking, carpentry, painting, blacksmithing, and the building trades. This knowledge was passed from one generation to the next, and many African Americans dominated these crafts after emancipation.

In addition to the building trades, Bullard also was educated in carpentry. He became very skilled at cutting and laying brick, marble, and granite, and cutting and laying pine and oak flooring. Racial prejudice began to manifest itself in the building industry in the American South in the late 19th century, though. Locals of the Brotherhood of Carpenters and Joiners union were segregated, so black workers were predominantly sent only to poor black neighborhoods. The building trades unions were much less likely to discriminate, because most of their skilled craftsmen were black. Even with that, though, many African American craftsmen migrated to northern cities between 1890 and 1910, in an effort to escape housing discrimination, segregation laws, and the loss of political power and legal rights.

In 1898, Bullard arrived in Saint Paul for the first time to do stonework for the third Minnesota State Capitol, designed by Cass Gilbert. Following the building's construction, he lived and worked in Minnesota seasonally until 1902, when he and his wife Addison (Addie) moved to the state permanently. Their first child, Lillie, was born in Saint Paul the same year.

Soon after, Bullard purchased land at 1282 Folsom Street in the Como Heights neighborhood of Saint Paul. His family lived in a tent on the property while he built a wooden house, which was under construction no later than 1904. Bullard worked on this house at night after he had completed his workday, often with his wife holding a kerosene lamp to provide light.

Bullard was a card-carrying member of the Bricklayers Local #1, which was highly unusual for an African American of his time. He likely became a member in Tennessee and received a traveling card to join the local union in Saint Paul when he moved to the city. This membership made him eligible for unionized work, which made up the bulk of significant construction work done in St. Paul in the early 20th century.

Bullard was part of the team that built many significant buildings in Saint Paul such as the Federal Courts Building (now the Landmark Center), the Cathedral of Saint Paul, the Minnesota Governor's Residence, Saint Paul Union Depot, and the Highland Park Tower.

Bullard had a reputation as an expert in his field, and he applied all of his skills, including carpentry, to this, his family's second home, which he built of brick at 1282 Folsom Street in 1909. The house has two stories in an American Foursquare design, a front and back porch, and a bay window. Other windows in the house held decorative stained glass. Bullard also built this house in the evenings after work.

The Bullard family, numbering twelve by 1917, lived in the brick house on Folsom Street until 1919, when they moved to another, larger property a few blocks away. Casiville Bullard lived in three other homes before his death on June 1, 1959.

== See also ==
- National Register of Historic Places listings in Ramsey County, Minnesota
