= Omaha Athletic Club =

- Interactive map of the Omaha Athletic Club area

General information
- Type: Social club
- Location: 1714 Douglas Street, Omaha, Nebraska, United States
- Coordinates: 41.25860°N 95.93870°W
- Opened: December 12, 1918
- Closed: 1970
- Demolished: February 9, 1992

Technical details
- Material: Bedford limestone

Design and construction
- Architecture firm: John Latenser & Sons
- Main contractor: Selden-Breck Construction

The Omaha Athletic Club was a social club building located at 1714 Douglas Street in Downtown Omaha, Nebraska, United States. The idea of such a building in downtown Omaha originated in 1915 when a group of Omaha businessmen, including George Brandeis, met to discuss its establishment.

The architect selected for the project was John Latenser & Sons. The general contractor was Selden-Breck Construction, and the lead decorator was Hugh Lawson of Orchard & Wilhelm. The first two floors of the ten-story Italian design building were of Bedford limestone, and the upper floors of red brick with stone trim. The building boasted a main dining room and a separate grill room, lounges, a ballroom, a bowling alley, and a billiards room. Furnished rooms were available for out-of-town guests, and a rooftop garden was available for weekend dances. Rental space for six stores was allowed on either side of the ornate entrance. The gymnasium was two stories high. There was a nine-hole golf course in the basement and open air handball and squash courts on the roof. The club's swimming pool was open two days a week to women and one morning a week to boys. At the time of its construction, The Omaha Athletic Club was one of the tallest concrete buildings in Omaha. Total cost of the building and its furnishings was $750,000.

The club was opened with public tours on December 12, 1918. A members-only gala was held December 14, 1918. The gala had two dinner seatings, one at 6:30 pm and a late supper at 8:30 pm. There were 1,500 members at the time the club opened. Total membership was limited to 2000 members.

Chef Rinaldo "Reno" Sibilia, of Ticino was installed as the club's chef. He would stay for 49 years. He created well-loved international dishes, including turkey au gratin, a member favorite. Of his kitchen, Sibilia stated in a 1970 interview, "We prided ourselves on making any dish a man wanted...to members this was more like home."

The club was forced to close in 1970 due to declining memberships. The building was sold in 1977 with plans to redevelop, and then sold again in 1983. Ultimately, the building was demolished by implosion on February 9, 1992 to make room for the Roman L. Hruska Federal Courthouse.
