= Center School (Omaha) =

- U.S. National Register of Historic Places
- Omaha Landmark
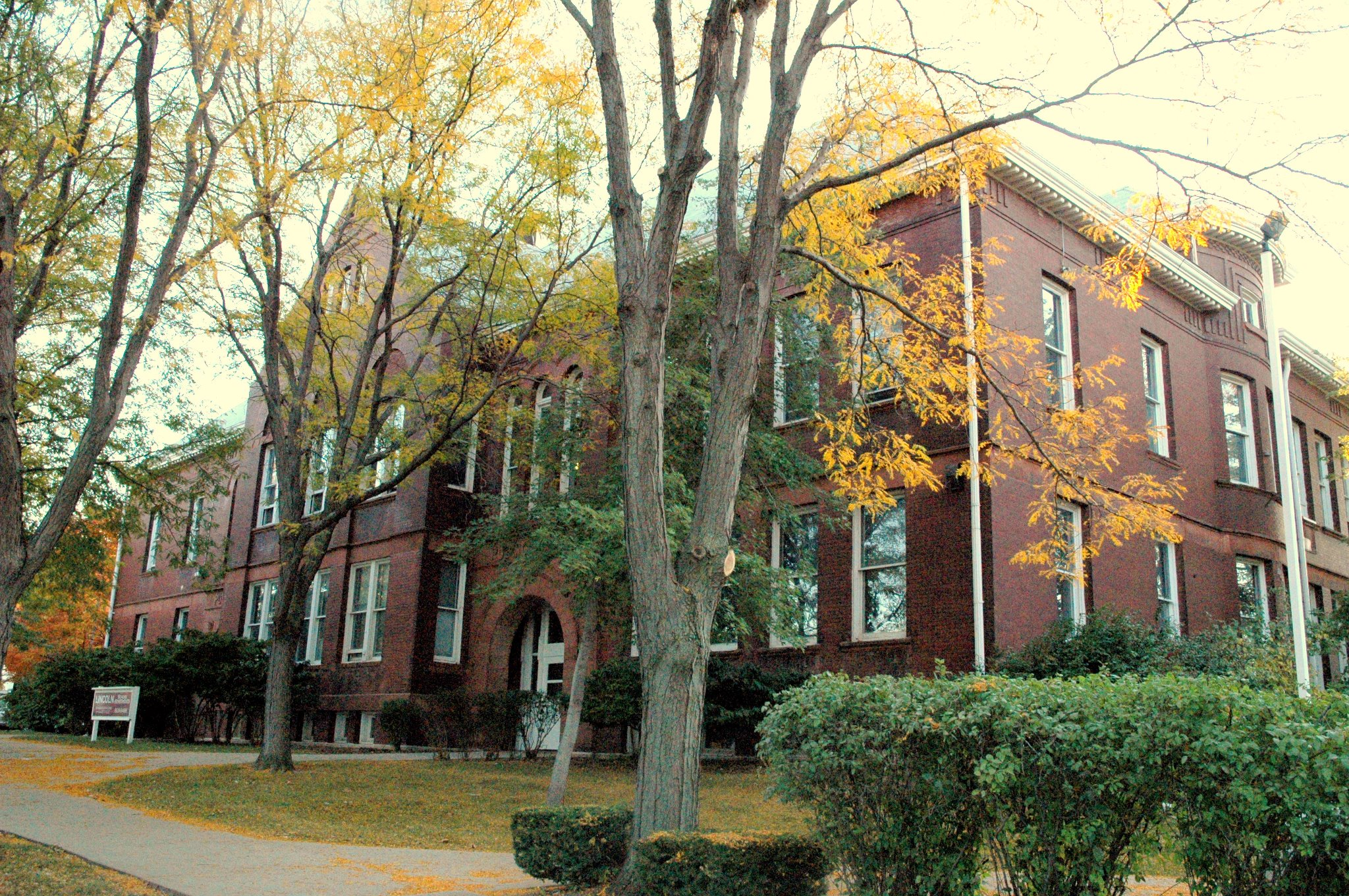

- Location within Nebraska Location within the United States
- Location: Omaha, Nebraska
- Coordinates: 41°14′29.59″N 95°55′50.31″W
- Built: 1893
- Architect: John Latenser, Sr.
- Architectural style: Richardsonian Romanesque
- NRHP reference No.: 85001796

Significant dates
- Added to NRHP: August 23, 1985
- Designated OMAL: June 18, 1985

The Center School, now known as the Lincoln School Apartments, is located at 1730 South 11th Street in South Omaha, Nebraska, United States. Built in 1893, it was declared an Omaha Landmark June 18, 1985 and listed on the National Register of Historic Places on August 23, 1985.

The building is one of only a very few major examples of the Richardsonian Romanesque style remaining in Omaha. Center School is one of 35 Omaha schools designed by architect John Latenser, Sr. The building was rehabilitated into apartments in 1987.
