= George H. Kelly House =

Historic house in Nebraska, United States

- U.S. National Register of Historic Places
- Omaha Landmark
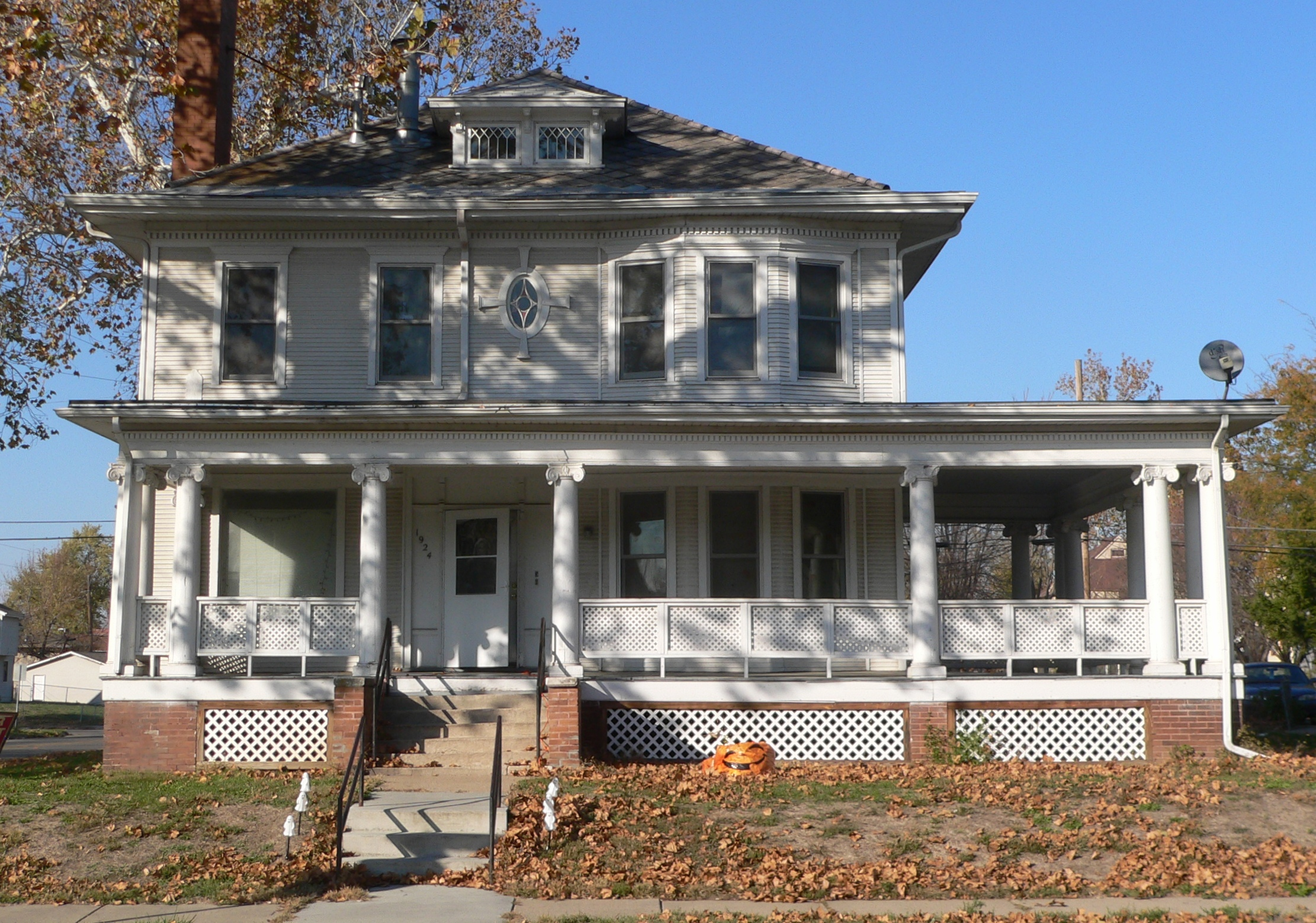

- Location within Nebraska Location within the United States
- Location: 1924 Binney Street, North Omaha, Nebraska
- Coordinates: 41°17′10.57″N 95°56′31.9″W
- Built: 1904
- Architect: George Kelly
- Architectural style: Neo-Classical Revival
- NRHP reference No.: 83001092

Significant dates
- Added to NRHP: 1983
- Designated OMAL: April 12, 1983

The George H. Kelly House is located at 1924 Binney Street in the Near North Side neighborhood of Omaha, Nebraska, United States. Built in 1904 in the Neo-Classical Revival style, it was listed on the National Register of Historic Places in 1983, and designated a City of Omaha architectural landmark that same year.

== About ==
Constructed in 1904, the Kelly House was designed by and built for George H. Kelly, the president of a manufacturing and distribution company for architectural millwork. The house features classically detailed structure directly influenced by the Trans-Mississippi and International Exposition, held nearby in Kountze Park in 1898, just six years before the house was constructed. The Kelly house is located in Kountze Place, a late nineteenth century neighborhood that was home to many of the city's most successful business people.

== See also ==
- History of North Omaha, Nebraska
