= Scottish Rite Cathedral (Omaha, Nebraska) =

- U.S. National Register of Historic Places
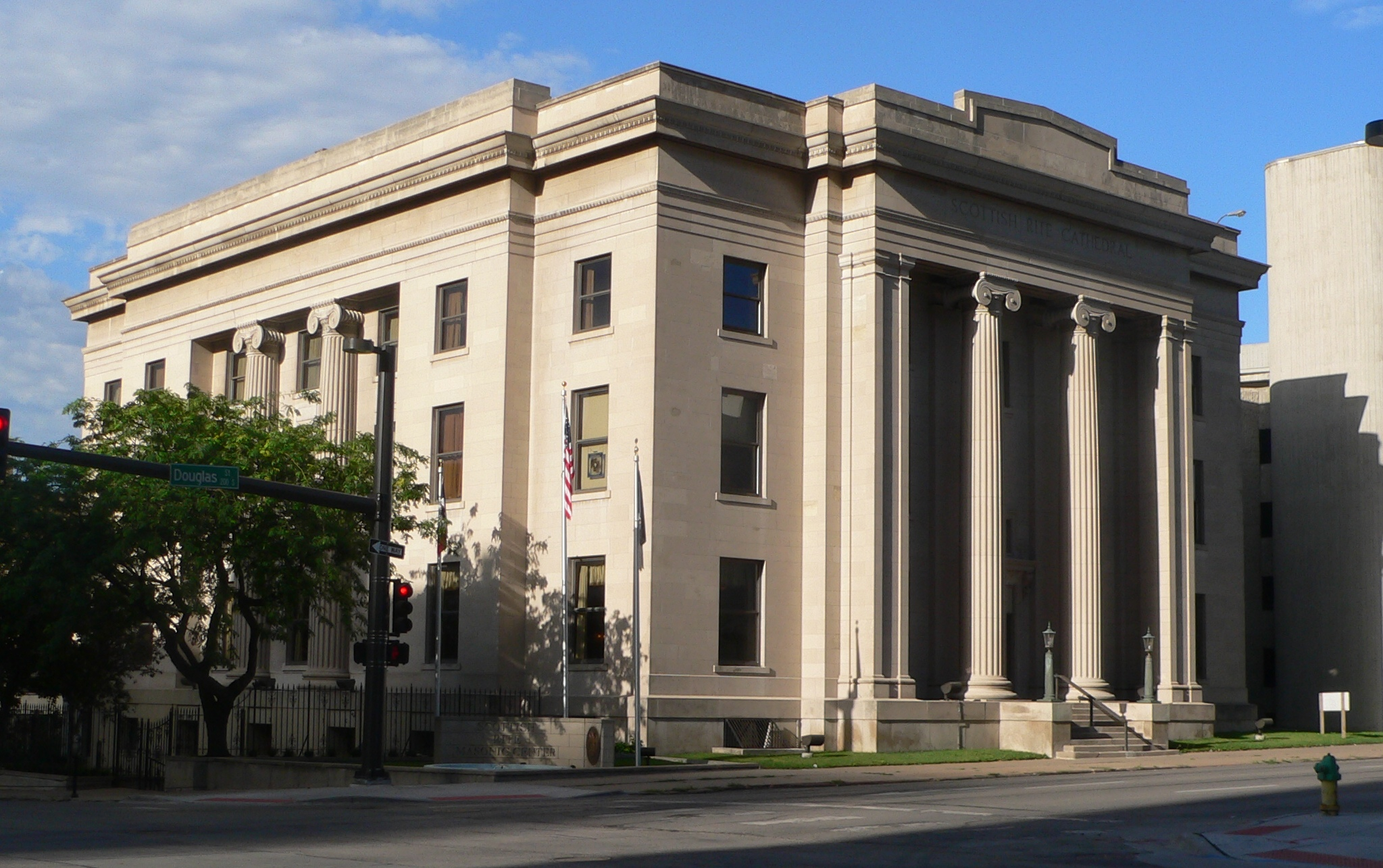
- Scottish Rite Cathedral, seen from the northeast; the north facade faces Douglas Street

- Location within Nebraska Location within the United States
- Location: 202 S. 20th St. Omaha, Nebraska
- Coordinates: 41°15′30″N 95°56′34.1″W
- Built: 1912-1914
- Architect: John Latenser Sr.
- Architectural style: Neoclassical
- NRHP reference No.: 11000529
- Added to NRHP: August 10, 2011

The Scottish Rite Cathedral is a Masonic building in Omaha in the state of Nebraska in the Midwestern United States. Begun in 1912 and opened in 1914, it remains in use by the Scottish Rite.

The building was designed in the Neoclassical Revival by Omaha architect John Latenser Sr. A native of Liechtenstein, Latenser studied in Stuttgart, Germany before emigrating to the United States in 1879. After working in Indianapolis, Chicago, and Cedar Rapids, Iowa, he moved to Omaha in 1887. His early work in Nebraska and Iowa consisted largely of designing cottages; but his reputation grew, and he was eventually appointed a Superintendent of Public Buildings during the administration of President William McKinley. His two sons joined his firm, which became John Latenser & Sons. The firm's work pervaded Omaha: "[i]n the 1930s, 89 of 98 blocks in Downtown Omaha contained at least one building designed by John Latenser and Son".

Latenser designed buildings in a variety of revival styles. For the Scottish Rite Temple, he turned to the principles of classical Greek design, using Ionic columns, which are significant in Masonic symbolism. The building is described as "the pinnacle of [Latenser's] works in the Neoclassical Revival style".

In 2011, the building was listed in the National Register of Historic Places. Cited in its nomination to the Register were both its architectural significance and the prominence of Freemasonry in Omaha's business and governmental leadership in course of the building's history.
