= Columbian School (Omaha, Nebraska) =

- U.S. National Register of Historic Places
- Omaha Landmark
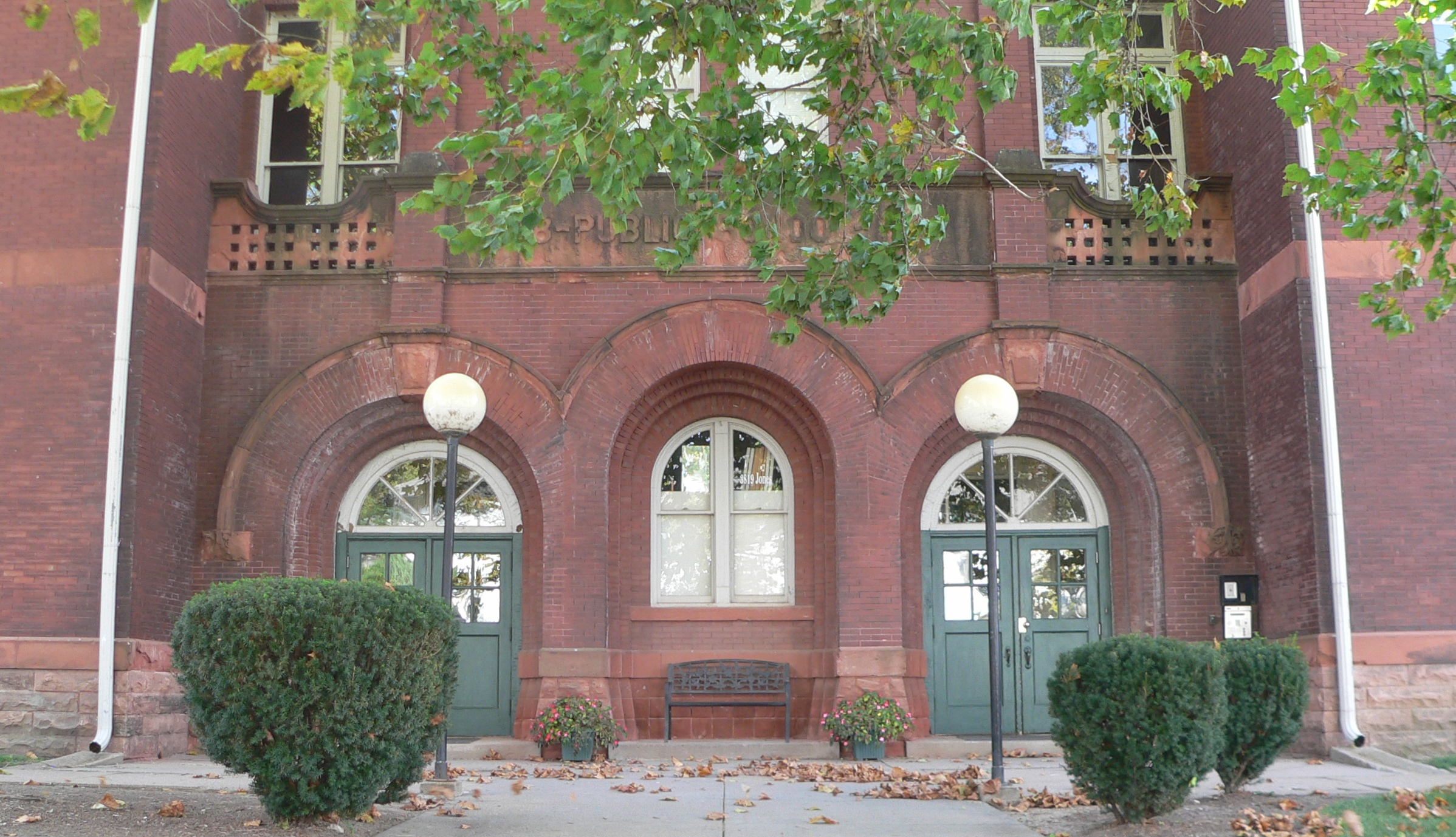
- Front (north) entrance of school

- Location within Nebraska Location within the United States
- Location: Omaha, Nebraska
- Coordinates: 41°15′12.03″N 95°58′10.11″W
- Built: 1892
- Architect: John Latenser, Sr.
- Architectural style: Romanesque
- NRHP reference No.: 90001769

Significant dates
- Added to NRHP: November 28, 1990
- Designated OMAL: October 30, 1990

The original Columbian Elementary School is a former public elementary school located at 3819 Jones Street in Omaha, Nebraska. It was listed on the National Register of Historic Places as Columbian School in 1990. It was declared an Omaha Landmark in 1990.

Originally opened in the 400th anniversary year of Christopher Columbus's voyage to the Americas, the school is a two-story building that was opened in 1892 and named in honor of the captain. According to the City of Omaha Landmarks Heritage Preservation Commission, "Columbian School is an excellent and rare example of the Richardsonian Romanesque style of architecture." Notable Omaha architect John Latenser, Sr. employed the style for many of the most important civic and commercial buildings constructed in Omaha in the late 19th century.

Following a rehabilitation in 1992, the former school was converted to rental residential space using federal historic preservation tax credits.

When the original Columbian closed, the community requested its name be given to a new school.
