= Beebe and Runyan Furniture Showroom and Warehouse =

- U.S. National Register of Historic Places
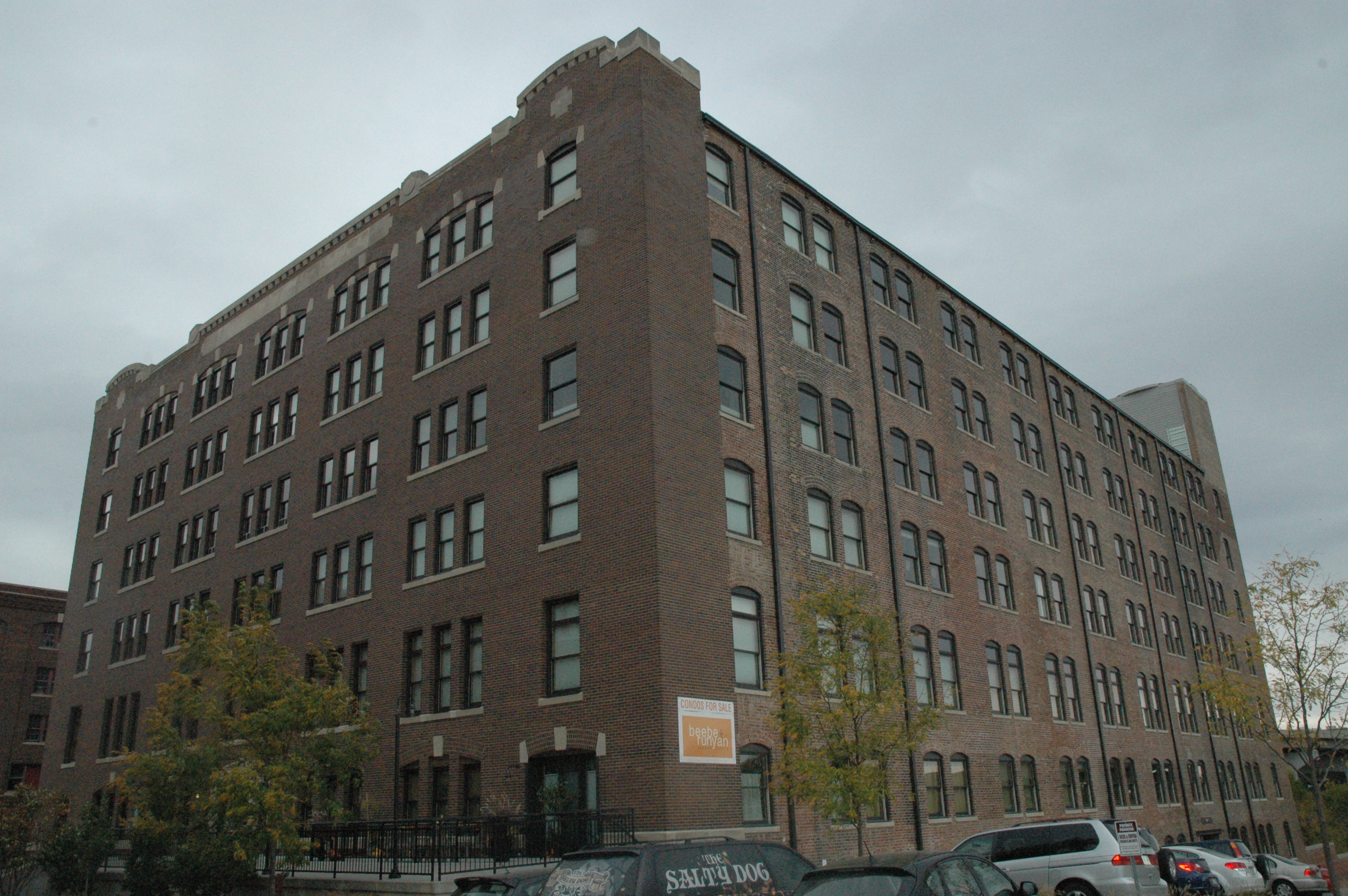
- Location: Downtown Omaha, Nebraska
- Coordinates: 41°15′34″N 95°55′39″W
- Built: 1913
- Architectural style: Renaissance Revival
- MPS: Warehouses in Omaha MPS
- NRHP reference No.: 98000895
- Added to NRHP: 1998

The Beebe and Runyan Furniture Showroom and Warehouse is located at 105 South 9th Street in Downtown Omaha, Nebraska. The building was listed on the National Register of Historic Places on July 23, 1998, and is a contributing property to the Warehouses in Omaha Multiple Property Submission.

== History ==
Built in 1913, the building is eight stories, and is made of brick and hollow tile. It was designed in the Renaissance Revival style for the Beebe and Runyan Furniture Company. The Leo A. Daly Sr. architecture firm designed a $10 million conversion of the Beebe and Runyan Furniture Showroom and Warehouse into a condominium, which was completed by the Boca Development Company in 2007. The building includes thermal insulated windows, reclaimed maple wood floor, exposed beamed ceilings and brick walls, and energy efficiency heat pumps backed by electric furnaces, along with other environmental and energy-efficient features.

== See also ==
- Transportation in Omaha
- History of Omaha
