= Omaha Rail and Commerce Historic District =

Historic district in Nebraska, United States

- U.S. National Register of Historic Places
- U.S. Historic district
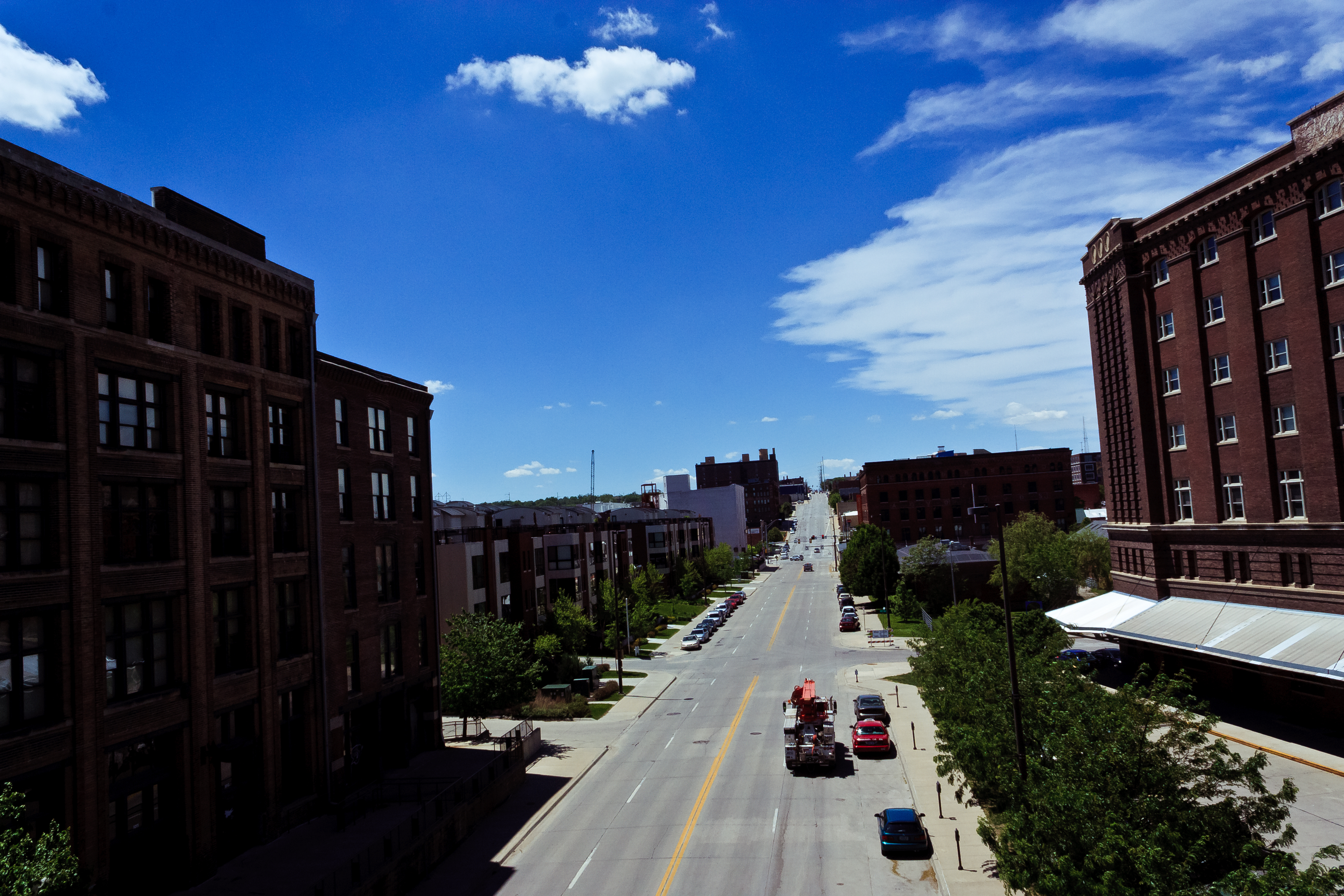
- View from the 10th Street Bridge, looking west

- Location within Nebraska Location within the United States
- Location: Roughly bounded by Jackson, 15th, 8th Sts., and UP Main Line, Omaha, Nebraska
- Coordinates: 41°15′9″N 95°55′46″W
- Area: 74.3 acres (30.1 ha)
- Built: 1887
- Architect: multiple
- Architectural style: late 19th and early 20th century American Movements
- NRHP reference No.: 96000769
- Added to NRHP: July 19, 1996

The Omaha Rail and Commerce Historic District, roughly bounded by Jackson, 15th, and 8th Streets, as well as the Union Pacific main line, is located in downtown Omaha, Nebraska. Today this historic district includes several buildings listed individually on the National Register of Historic Places, including the Union Pacific Depot and the Burlington Station.

== About ==
The Union Pacific Railroad was of central importance to the growth of Omaha, particularly between 1887 and 1945. Buildings in the Omaha Rail and Commerce Historic District were built to serve business related to the main line of the transcontinental railroad, which runs through the present-day district. Large warehouses, manufacturing warehouses, transfer and storage companies, and service businesses filled the area.

Today, the buildings border the Old Market, and serve as apartments, artist studios and other commercial enterprises.

== Notable buildings ==
Several buildings within the Omaha Rail and Commerce Historic District are listed on the National Register of Historic Places or are significant for their local history.

Name	Year	Location	Notes
Bushman Warehouse	1890	1013 Leavenworth Street	This is a five-story brick and stone building originally used as a warehouse. The Bushman Warehouse was converted to rental residential and commercial space in 1998.
Union Pacific Depot	1931	10th and Marcy Streets	
Burlington Station	1898	10th and Pacific Streets	
Bemis Bag Company Building	1889	11th and Jones Streets	Built in 3 phases between 1887 and 1902, the oldest part of the building is the portion next to the alley on 11th street.
Avery Manufacturing Warehouse	1899		
Mercantile Storage and Warehouse Building	1920		
Sattley Manufacturing Building	1899		
Butternut Building	1909	714-716 South 10th Street, Omaha, Nebraska	Also known as the Parlin, Orendorff and Martin Plow Company Building, this nine-story building was designed in the Renaissance Revival style by John Latenser, Sr.
Creighton Block	1906		
Bekins Building	1916		Also known as the Western Newspaper Union and the Joslyn Lofts.

== See also ==
- Railroads in Omaha
- Jobbers Canyon Historic District
- Old Market Historic District
- Warehouses in Omaha MPS
