= Keeline Building =

Historic building in Omaha, Nebraska (John Latenser Sr, 1911)

- U.S. National Register of Historic Places
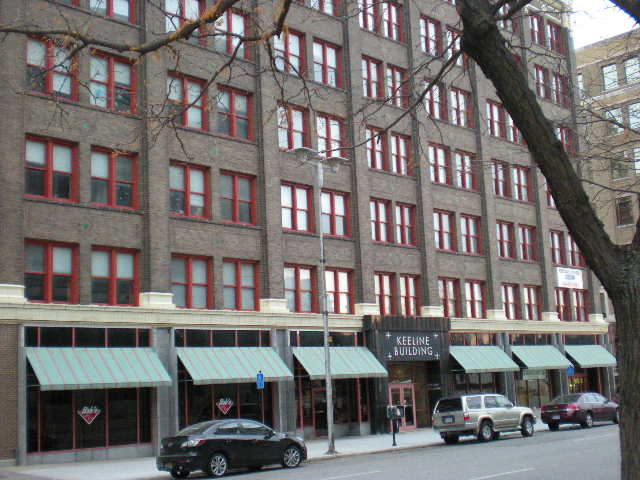

- Location within Nebraska Location within the United States
- Location: Omaha, Nebraska
- Coordinates: 41°15′24.77″N 95°56′17.62″W
- Built: 1911
- Architect: John Latenser, Sr.
- Architectural style: Early Commercial, Prairie School
- NRHP reference No.: 00000170
- Added to NRHP: March 9, 2000

The Keeline Building is an office and retail building located in downtown Omaha, Nebraska at 319 South 17th Street. The mixed-use building was completed in 1911 just before construction of the neighboring Douglas County Courthouse was completed, the seven-story Keeline was designed by locally renowned architect John Latenser, Sr. The Building was part of a historic redevelopment in 2023 revitalizing the building into premium modern office with its original historic charm. The Keeline is built in the Georgian Revival style, said to represent "the prosperous commercial development in Omaha during this period." In 2010 the building was sold to KMC Properties LLC, of Council Bluffs, Iowa.
