= Eggerss–O'Flyng Building =

- U.S. National Register of Historic Places
- Omaha Landmark
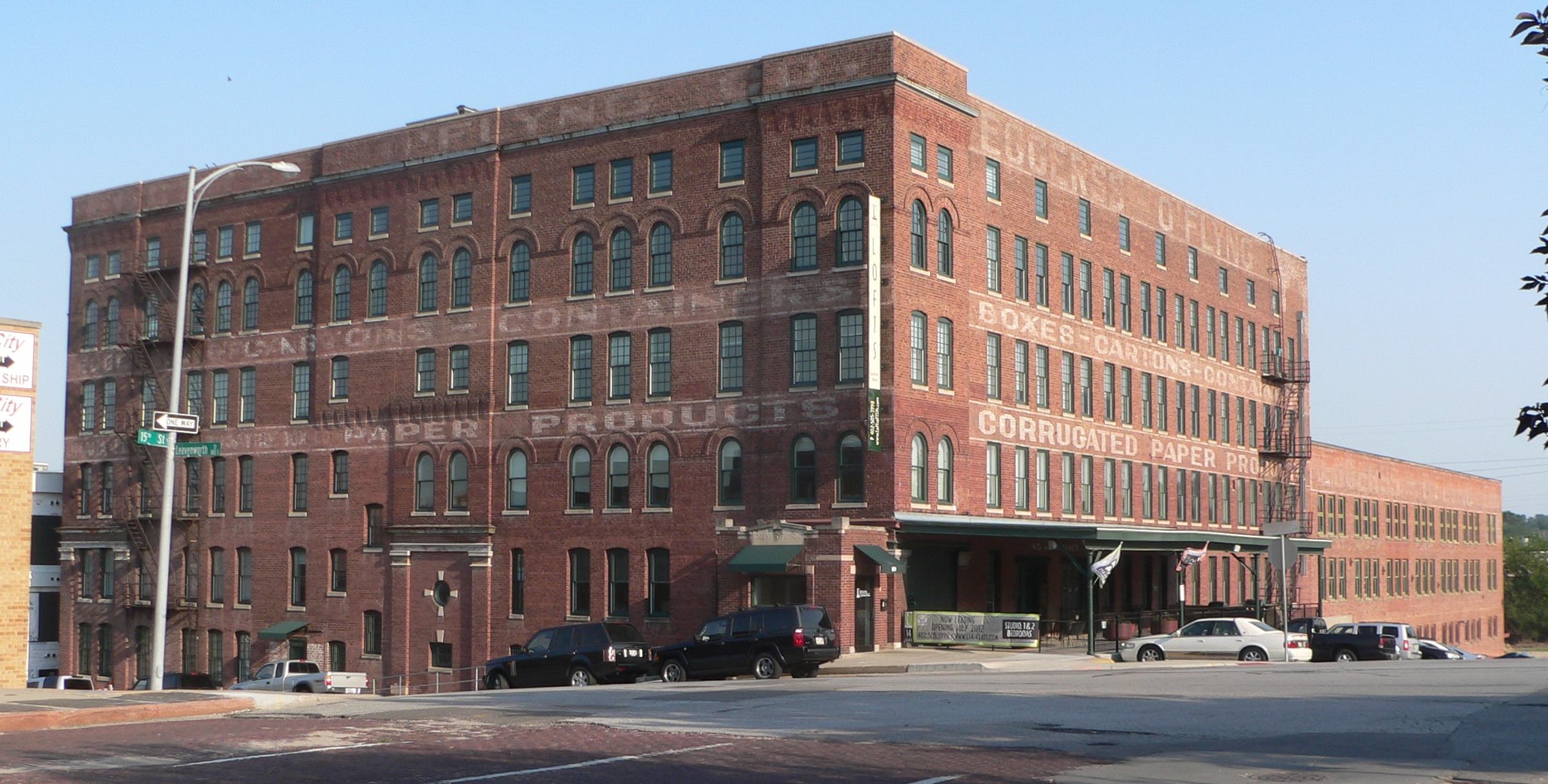
- View from the northwest, across the intersection of 15th and Leavenworth Streets.

- Location within Nebraska Location within the United States
- Location: 801 S 15th St, Omaha, NE 68108, USA
- Coordinates: 41°15′7″N 95°56′7.6″W
- Built: 1902,1912,1918
- Architect: Guth, Joseph; Latenser, John
- Architectural style: Renaissance
- MPS: Warehouses in Omaha MPS
- NRHP reference No.: 91001759

Significant dates
- Added to NRHP: December 13, 1991
- Designated OMAL: March 17, 1992

The Eggerss–O'Flyng Building is located at 801 South 15th Street in downtown Omaha, Nebraska, United States. The building was listed on the National Register of Historic Places in 1991, and named an Omaha Landmark on March 17, 1992.

== About ==
The building was constructed in four stages starting in 1902 and finished in 1928. For fifty years, it was the headquarters for the Eggerss–O'Flyng Company, which manufactured cardboard boxes. The building was designed in the Renaissance Revival style by John Latenser, Sr. In the early 1900s, it was common for businesses in Omaha to build warehouses near the railroad on the east and south side of town, the Douglas Eggerss–O'Flyng building being one of these.

The Eggerrs–O'Flyng Company was founded by German immigrant August J. Eggerss in 1881. After constructing the building, Eggerss merged with Ivyl O'Flyng in 1903, who became the company's treasurer. William Dennis Lane, who started with the company in 1900 at age 15 as a factory helper, became president in 1932 and remained president until the company was sold sometime after 1950. At its largest, the Eggerrs–O'Flyng Company's payroll consisted of 225 employees. During World War II, the company manufactured cardboard boxes for 20 millimeter shells, 90 millimeter shells, bomb fuses and other items going overseas to the armed forces. For many years, it manufactured cigar boxes, and in its later years, boxes for foodstuffs.

In 1993, the building was renovated at a cost of $3.3 million and turned into loft style apartments. It now houses 48 units. In addition to being listed independently on the National Register of Historic Places individually, the building is listed as a contributing property to the Warehouses in Omaha Multiple Properties Submission.

== See also ==
- Landmarks in Omaha
- History of Omaha
