= Harriet Island Pavilion =

- U.S. National Register of Historic Places
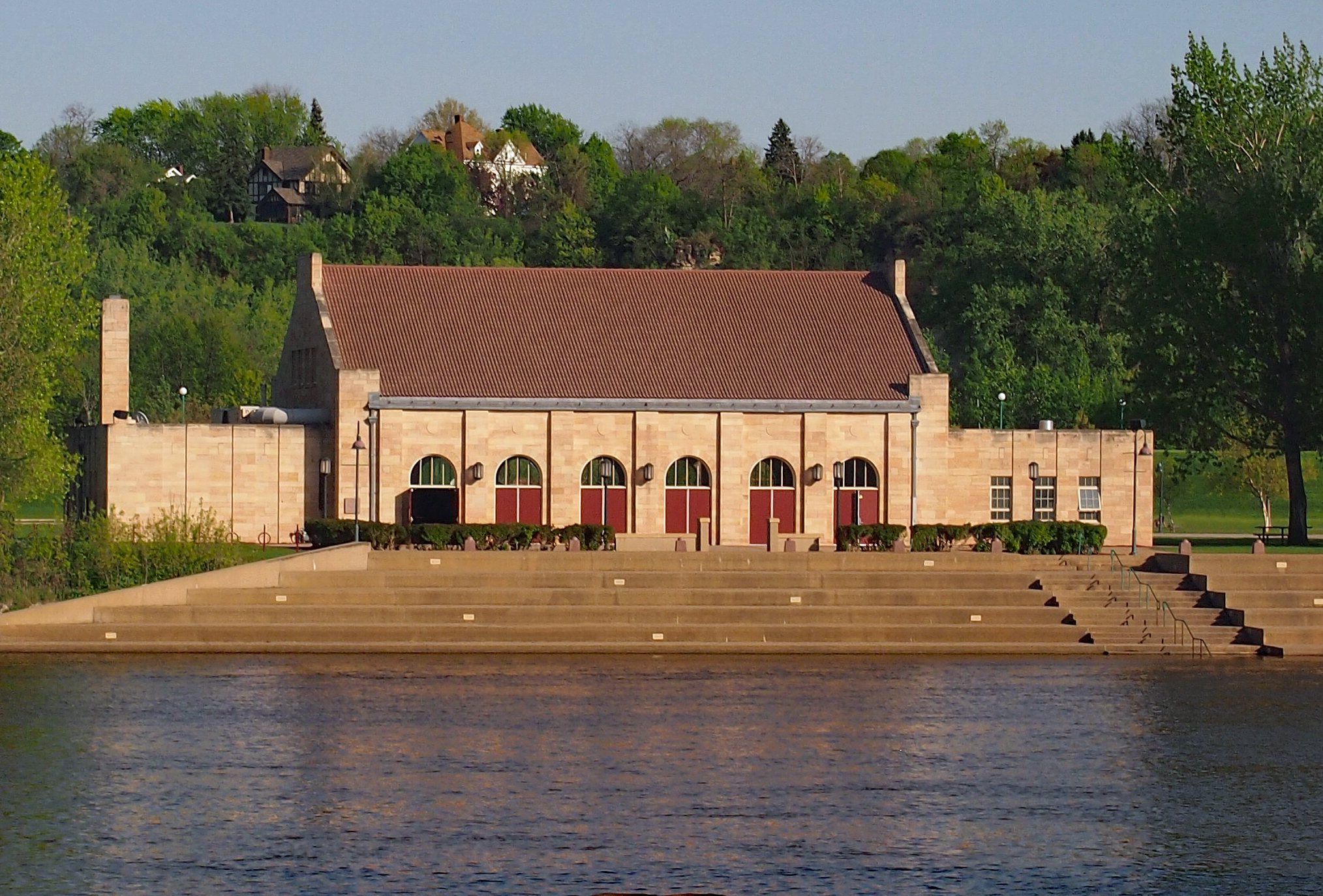
- The Harriet Island Pavilion from across the Mississippi River

- Location within Minnesota Location within the United States
- Location: 200 Dr. Justus Ohage Blvd; Saint Paul, Minnesota
- Coordinates: 44°56′16″N 93°05′50″W
- Built: 1941
- Architect: Clarence W. Wigington
- Architectural style: Moderne
- NRHP reference No.: 92000821
- Added to NRHP: July 10, 1992

The Harriet Island Pavilion, also known as the Clarence W. Wigington Pavilion, is a park pavilion on Harriet Island just across the Mississippi River from downtown Saint Paul, Minnesota, United States. It was designed by Clarence W. Wigington, the nation's first black municipal architect, and renamed for Wigington after a 2000 restoration. Harriet island was named for Harriet Bishop, a Baptist school teacher from Vermont. She arrived in Saint Paul in 1847, was involved in the temperance movement, and opened the first school in the frontier city, teaching children of diverse ethnic, racial, and religious backgrounds.

== History ==
The park at Harriet Island was built by Dr. Justus Ohage, Saint Paul's health officer, who donated the land to the city in 1900. His idea for the park was to build a place for healthy living in the center of the city. The park originally had a public bathhouse and beach, along with amenities like playgrounds, picnic grounds, handball and tennis courts, and a bandstand. The park was initially very popular, but pollution from the Mississippi River forced the bathhouse to close in 1919. The city made several attempts to revitalize the park, but none of the attempts was particularly successful until the Works Progress Administration built the pavilion in 1941-1942.

The architecture combines Moderne design with classical influences. The Kasota limestone used in the construction was salvaged from the former Saint Paul City Hall and Ramsey County Courthouse, which was built in 1889 and demolished in 1933.

== See also ==
- Minnesota Boat Club Boathouse on Raspberry Island
- Mississippi National River and Recreation Area
