= Bemis Omaha Bag Company Building =

- U.S. National Register of Historic Places
- Omaha Landmark
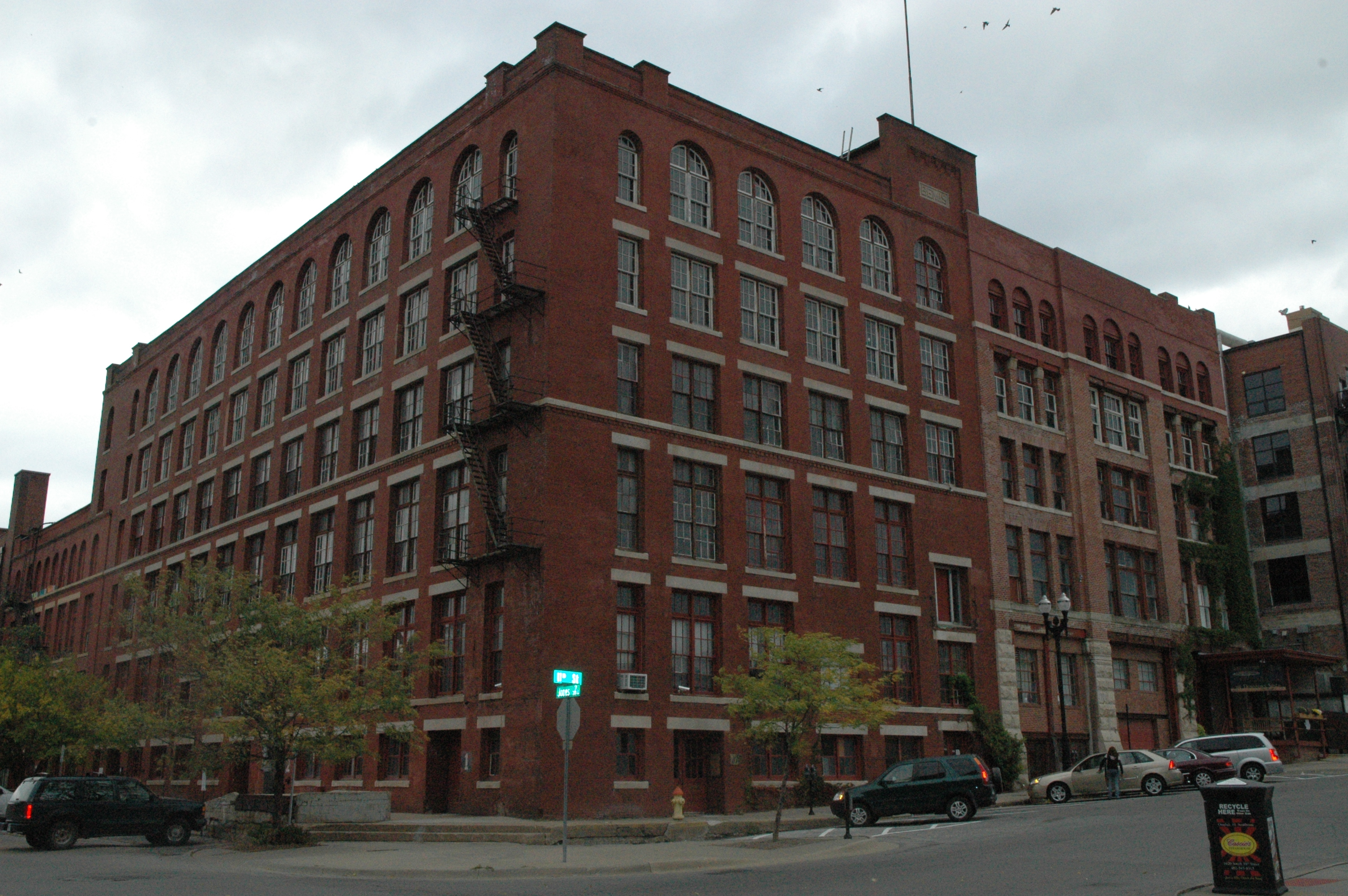

- Location within Nebraska Location within the United States
- Location: 1102–1118 Jones Street, Omaha, Nebraska
- Coordinates: 41°15′12.68″N 95°55′51.81″W
- Built: 1887–1902
- Architect: Mendelssohn & Lawrie; Harte & Lindsay
- Architectural style: Chicago
- NRHP reference No.: 85000066

Significant dates
- Added to NRHP: January 11, 1985
- Designated OMAL: September 12, 1978

The Bemis Bag Company Building is a historic building located in downtown Omaha, Nebraska. Built in 1887 in a commercial style, the building was designed by the prolific Omaha architecture firm of Mendelssohn and Lawrie. It was designated an Omaha Landmark on September 12, 1978, and was added to the National Register of Historic Places on January 11, 1985. In addition to its own listing on the NRHP, the Building is also included in the Warehouses in Omaha Multiple Property Submission.

The Bemis Company was a national leader in the manufacturing and sale of bags and sacks for flour, grain, and other commodities. It had warehouses and manufacturing facilities in several cities across the United States. This building cost about $40,000 to build.

== See also ==
- Bemis Center for Contemporary Arts
- Bemis Park Landmark Heritage District
