= Alfred Juergens =

American painter (1866–1934)

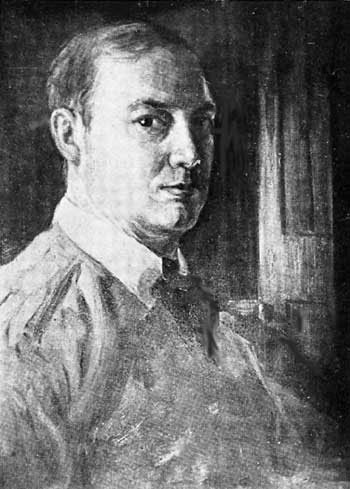
- Self-Portrait
- Born: 5 August 1866; Chicago, United States
- Died: 18 April 1934 (aged 67); Oak Park, Illinois, United States
- Movement: Impressionism

Alfred Juergens (August 5, 1866 – April 18, 1934) was an American impressionist painter.

== Life ==
Alfred Juergens had German roots: his father Ludwig Daniel Juergens had immigrated to Milwaukee in the early 1840s. Ludwig Daniel Juergens earned his money with painting, although at times only as a sign painter. Together with his eldest son Theodore, he founded a business called L. Juergens & Son, Paints in 1875. His daughter Bertha married Adolph Kruger in 1876, who would later also join the family business.

Juergens was born in Chicago. He is said to have said of his early childhood upbringing "You might say I was born in a paint-pot". Two early flower still lifes have been preserved, which he probably painted when he was ten years old. His father wanted to spare him the fate of a starving artist and initially insisted on a commercial career, but the son pushed through his wish to become a painter.

He began his artistic training at the Academy of Design in Chicago before travelling to Europe to continue his studies after the death of his father in 1883. From Scotland he travelled to London and via Holland to Germany, where he initially received private lessons from Robert Koehler and Paul Nanen. On 19 January 1886 he enrolled in the Academic Preparatory School at the Art Academy in Munich and continued his studies on 18 October 1887 in the nature class with Nikolaos Gyzis and Wilhelm von Diez. He lived in Paris from 1889 to 1893. He returned to Chicago, to work on the World's Columbian Exposition of 1893, likely on murals or other decorations, and set up a studio in the building of the Academy of Design. In 1894 he returned to Munich, from where he also travelled to Italy. The illness and death of his mother Wilhelmina, née Prosch, finally prompted him to return to America. There he also gave lessons; Among his students was Clarence W. Wigington.

In 1895, 1898 and 1900 he exhibited in the Munich Glass Palace. He was then represented at exhibitions in the US, including the Panama–Pacific International Exposition in San Francisco in 1915. In 1899, 36 of his oil paintings were shown at the Art Institute in Chicago.

Juergens created landscapes, portraits and figure depictions that were influenced by Impressionism. His paintings John the Baptist and Let the Little Children Come to Me are in St. Paul's Church in Chicago. The Art Institute in Chicago owns Afternoon in May from 1913. The painter's works are also in the Cliff Dwellers and the Union League Club as well as in the Clark Gallery in Grand Rapids. Ellsworth E. Howard predicted a great future for Juergens in 1901. Over 100 years later, numerous works by the artist from the Tikalsky Collection, which Francis Tikalsky had once put together, were shown to the public again.

Juergens died in 1934 in Oak Park, Illinois.

== Gallery ==
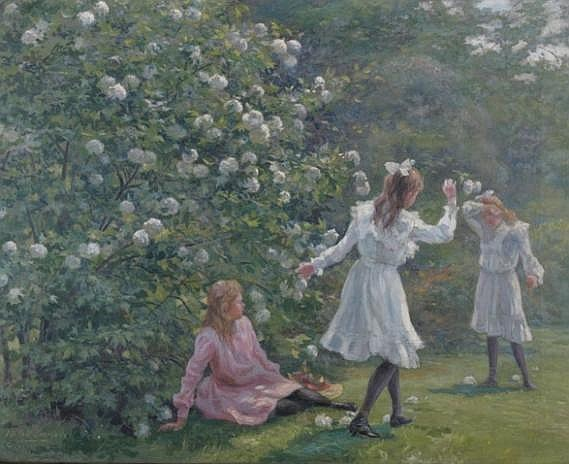
Playing Children

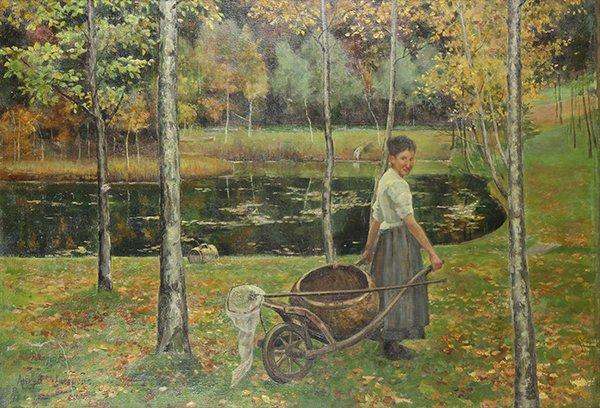
Near the Lake (Black Forest, Germany)

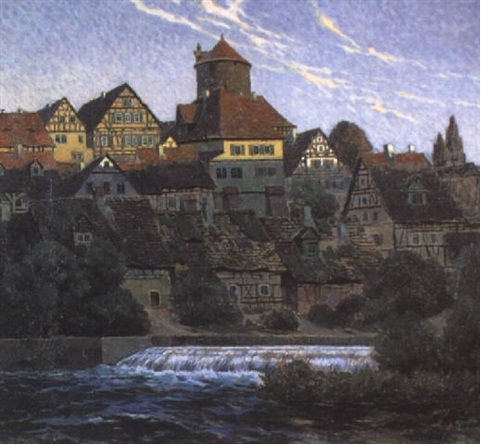
Besigheim
