= Carl Max Schultheiss =

German-American engraver (1885–1961)

- Born: 1885; Nuremberg, Germany
- Died: 1961 (aged 75–76); New York City, New York, U.S.
- Occupation(s): Graphic designer, engraver

Carl Max Schultheiss (1885 in Nuremberg – 1961 in New York City) was a German graphic designer, active since 1940 in the United States.

== Education ==
Schultheiss studied at the former Royal School of Applied Arts in Nuremberg and at the Academy of Fine Arts in Munich under Wilhelm von Diez.

== Career ==
He worked mainly as an engraver and book graphic designer, was also involved in fresco painting.

Schultheiss emigrated in May 1939 to the United Kingdom. He came in March 1940 to the United States, where he continued his activities.

In 1951, he began to experiment with printing in color.

Schultheiss was elected a member of the National Academy of Design in New York City, and was awarded with the John Taylor Arms Prize at the 29th Annual Exhibition of the Society of American Etchers.

He exhibited his works in the Carnegie Museums of Pittsburgh, the Art Institute of Chicago, and the Library of Congress. In 1946, a solo exhibition of his works took place in the Corcoran Gallery of Art in Washington, D.C.

== Personal life ==
Schultheiss married Alice Trier in 1914.
