= Clarence W. Wigington =

American architect

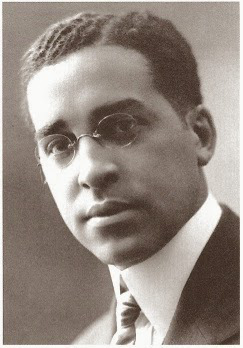
- Wigington circa 1905
- Born: April 21, 1883; Lawrence, Kansas
- Died: July 7, 1967 (aged 84); Kansas City, Missouri
- Occupation: Architect
- Spouse: Viola Williams

Clarence Wesley "Cap" Wigington (1883-1967) was an American architect who grew up in Omaha, Nebraska. After winning three first prizes in charcoal, pencil, and pen and ink at an art competition during the Trans-Mississippi Exposition in 1899, Wigington went on to become a renowned architect across the Midwestern United States, at a time when African-American architects were few. Wigington was the nation's first black municipal architect, serving 34 years as senior designer for the City of Saint Paul, Minnesota's architectural office when the city had an ambitious building program. Sixty of his buildings still stand in St. Paul, with several recognized on the National Register of Historic Places. Wigington's architectural legacy is one of the most significant bodies of work by an African-American architect.

== Biography ==
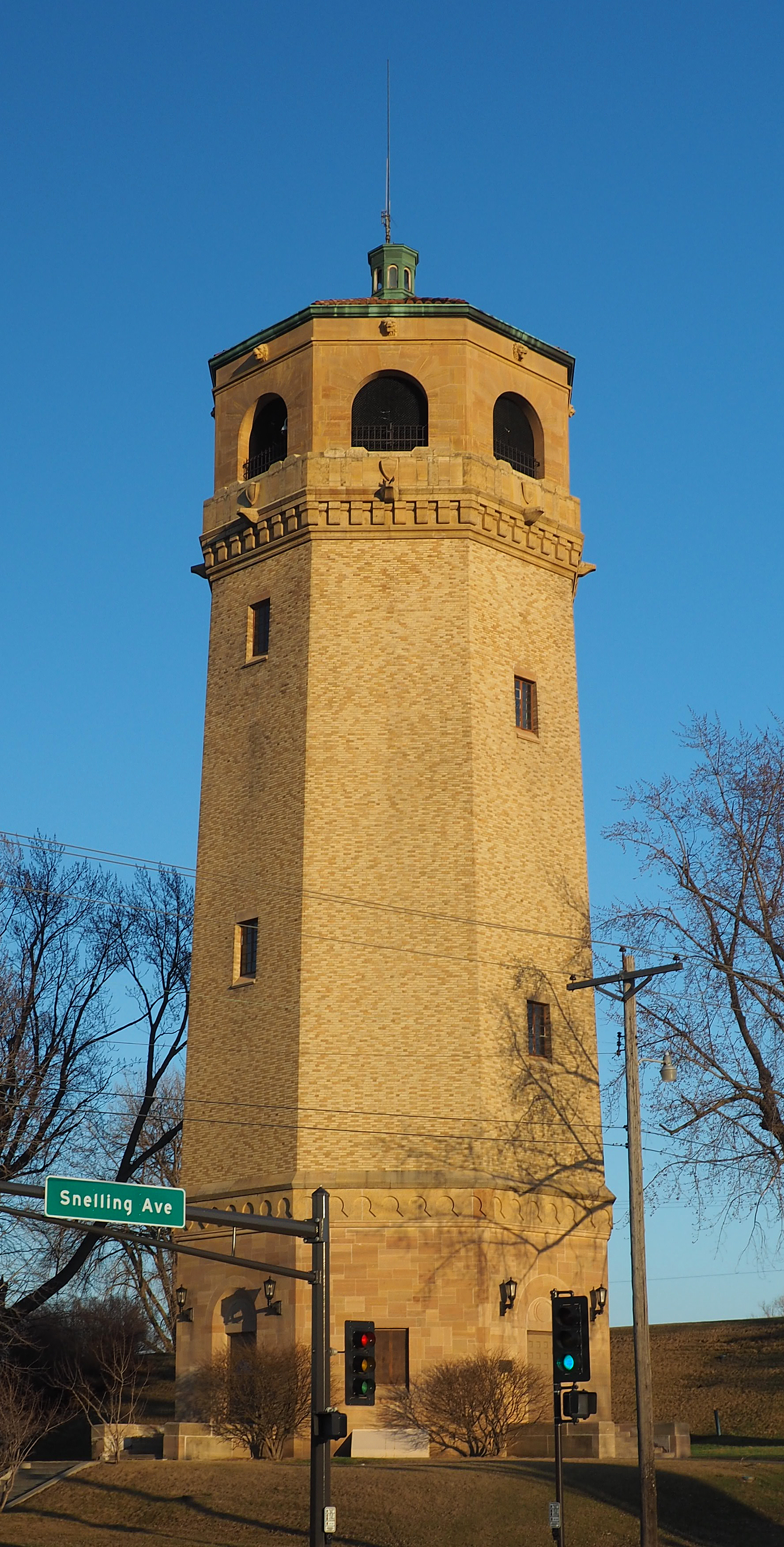
The Highland Park Tower in Saint Paul, Minnesota

Clarence Wesley Wigington was born in Lawrence, Kansas, in 1883, but his family soon moved to Omaha, where he was raised in North Omaha's Walnut Hill neighborhood. From 1900 to 1904 he attended evening courses taught by Alfred Juergens and J. Laurie Wallace. After graduating from Omaha High School at the age of 15, Wigington left an Omaha art school in 1902 to work for Thomas R. Kimball, then president of the American Institute of Architects. After six years he started his own office. In 1910 Wigington was listed by the U.S. Census as one of only 59 African-American architects, artists and draftsmen in the country. While in Omaha, Wigington designed the Broomfield Rowhouse, Zion Baptist Church, and the second St. John's African Methodist Episcopal Church building, along with several other single and multiple family dwellings.

After marrying Viola Williams, Wigington received his first public commission, to design a small brick potato chip factory in Sheridan, Wyoming. He ran the establishment for several years.

Wigington continued his work in Saint Paul, Minnesota, where he earned a national reputation. He moved there in 1914 and by 1917 was promoted to the position of senior architectural designer for the City of St. Paul. During the 1920s and '30s, Wigington designed most of the Saint Paul Public Schools buildings, as well as golf clubhouses, fire stations, park buildings, and airports for the city. Other Wigington structures include the Highland Park Tower, the Holman Field Administration Building and the Harriet Island Pavilion, all now listed on the National Register of Historic Places, as well as the Roy Wilkins Auditorium. Wigington also designed monumental ice palaces for the St. Paul Winter Carnival in the 1930s and '40s.

Wigington was among the 13 founders of the Sterling Club, a social club for railroad porters, bellboys, waiters, drivers and other black men. He founded the Home Guards of Minnesota, an all-black militia established in 1918 when racial segregation prohibited his entry into the Minnesota National Guard during World War I. As the leader of that group, he was given the rank of captain, from which the nickname "Cap" was derived.

After retiring from the City of St. Paul in 1949, Wigington began a private architectural practice in California. Soon after moving to Kansas City, Missouri in 1967, he died on July 7.

== Notable designs ==
As senior architect for the city, Wigington designed schools, fire stations, park structures and municipal buildings. Aside from his work in Omaha, Wigington also designed the building which originally hosted the North Carolina State University at Durham.

Nearly 60 Wigington-designed buildings still stand in St. Paul. They include the notable Highland Park Clubhouse, Cleveland High School, Randolph Heights Elementary School, and the downtown St. Paul Police Station, in addition to the Palm House and the Zoological Building at the Como Park Zoo. Fire Station No. 19, just north of the Highland Park Tower, is listed on the National Register of Historic Places as of April 2023. Although Wigington is not listed on the blueprints, the NRHP listing affirms that "it is likely Wigington was at least consulted in the design of Fire Station No. 19, if not serving as the primary designer himself."

Notable Wigington-designed buildings in order of year of construction
Name	Location	Constructed	NRHP?
Broomfield Rowhouse	2502-2504 Lake Street, North Omaha, Nebraska	1913	Yes
Zion Baptist Church	2215 Grant Street, North Omaha	1914	No
Como Park Elementary School	780 Wheelock Parkway W., St. Paul, Minnesota	1916	No
Highland Park Tower	1570 Highland Parkway, St. Paul	1928	Yes
Roy Wilkins Auditorium	175 Kellogg Boulevard West, St. Paul	1932	No
Holman Field Administration Building	644 Bayfield Street, St. Paul	1939	Yes
Hamline Playground Recreation Center	1564 Lafond Ave., St. Paul	1940	No
Harriet Island Pavilion	75 Water Street, St. Paul	1941	Yes
St. James A.M.E. Church	624 Central Avenue West, St. Paul		No
Private residence for Jack G. Butwin	357 Woodlawn Ave., St. Paul	1948	No

== Legacy ==
Sixty of his buildings still stand in Saint Paul, with four recognized by listing on the National Register of Historic Places, in addition to another Register-listed building he likely designed. His architectural legacy constitutes one of the most significant bodies of work by an African-American architect.

Renamed to honor Wigington in 1998, the Harriet Island Pavilion is now called the Clarence W. Wigington Pavilion.

== See also ==
- Architecture of North Omaha, Nebraska
