= Broomfield Rowhouse =

Historic house in Nebraska, United States

- U.S. National Register of Historic Places
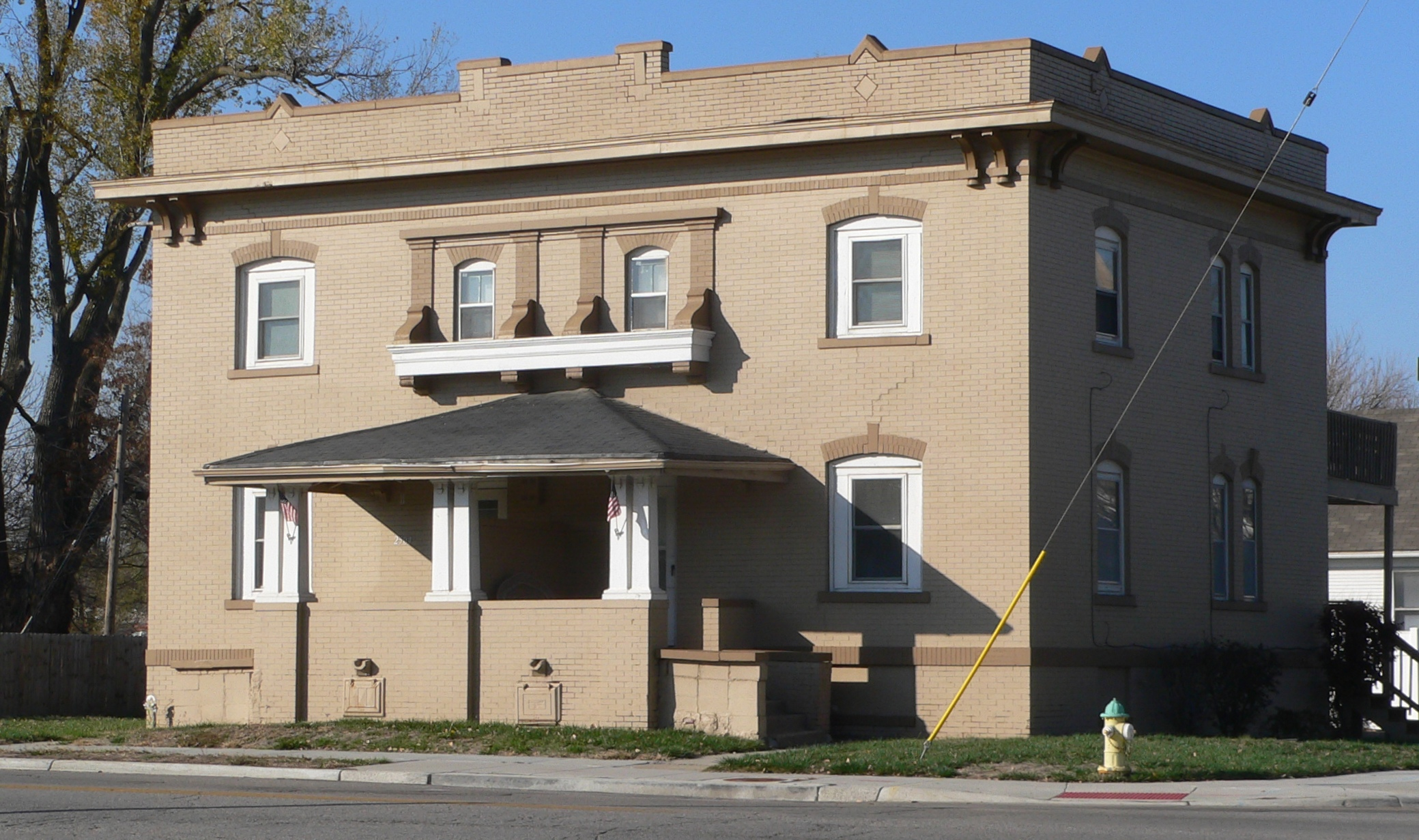

- Location within Nebraska Location within the United States
- Location: 2502-2504 Lake Street, Omaha, Nebraska
- Coordinates: 41°16′54.8″N 95°56′55.68″W
- Area: 54
- Built: 1913
- Architect: Clarence Wesley (Cap) Wigington
- NRHP reference No.: 07000179
- Added to NRHP: March 21, 2007

The Broomfield Rowhouse is located at 2502-2504 Lake Street in the Near North Side neighborhood of Omaha, Nebraska. It was designed by African American architect Clarence W. Wigington, who was later regarded as a master in his field. His design for the house won a 1909 Good Housekeeping competition. The house is listed on the National Register of Historic Places.

== History ==
This historic rowhouse was built in the wake of the Easter Sunday Tornado of 1913 which ravaged Midtown and North Omaha. The building was designed by Clarence W. Wigington, a well-known African American architect raised in Omaha. The influence of Wigington's mentor, Thomas R. Kimball, is evident throughout the design of the structure. Wigington originally designed the building in 1909 for a contest organized by Good Housekeeping magazine. He won first prize for the best two-family dwelling.

In a recent biography of the architect, the Minnesota Historical Society described the building:

At first glance, simple rectangles in a craftsman vein, they pierce the skyline with a succession of minutely scaled triangles and rectangles – a sort of Gothicism shorn of religious aspirations... four pilasters rise from a broad pedestal... One can always sense him looking for that one element of the building to put on center stage and wrap with scenic effects, whatever the dictates of the stylistic propriety.

The rowhouse's original owner was Jack Broomfield, a key African-American political leader during the reign of Tom Dennison, informal political boss in the city.

According to the Omaha preservation organization Landmarks, Inc., the Broomfield Rowhouse was selected for the Register under the following criteria:

Property embodies the distinctive characteristics of a type, period, or method of a construction or represents the role of a master, or possesses a high artistic value, or represents a significant and distinguishable entity whose components lack individual distinction.

== See also ==
- History of North Omaha, Nebraska
- Architecture of North Omaha, Nebraska
