= Holman Field Administration Building =

- U.S. National Register of Historic Places
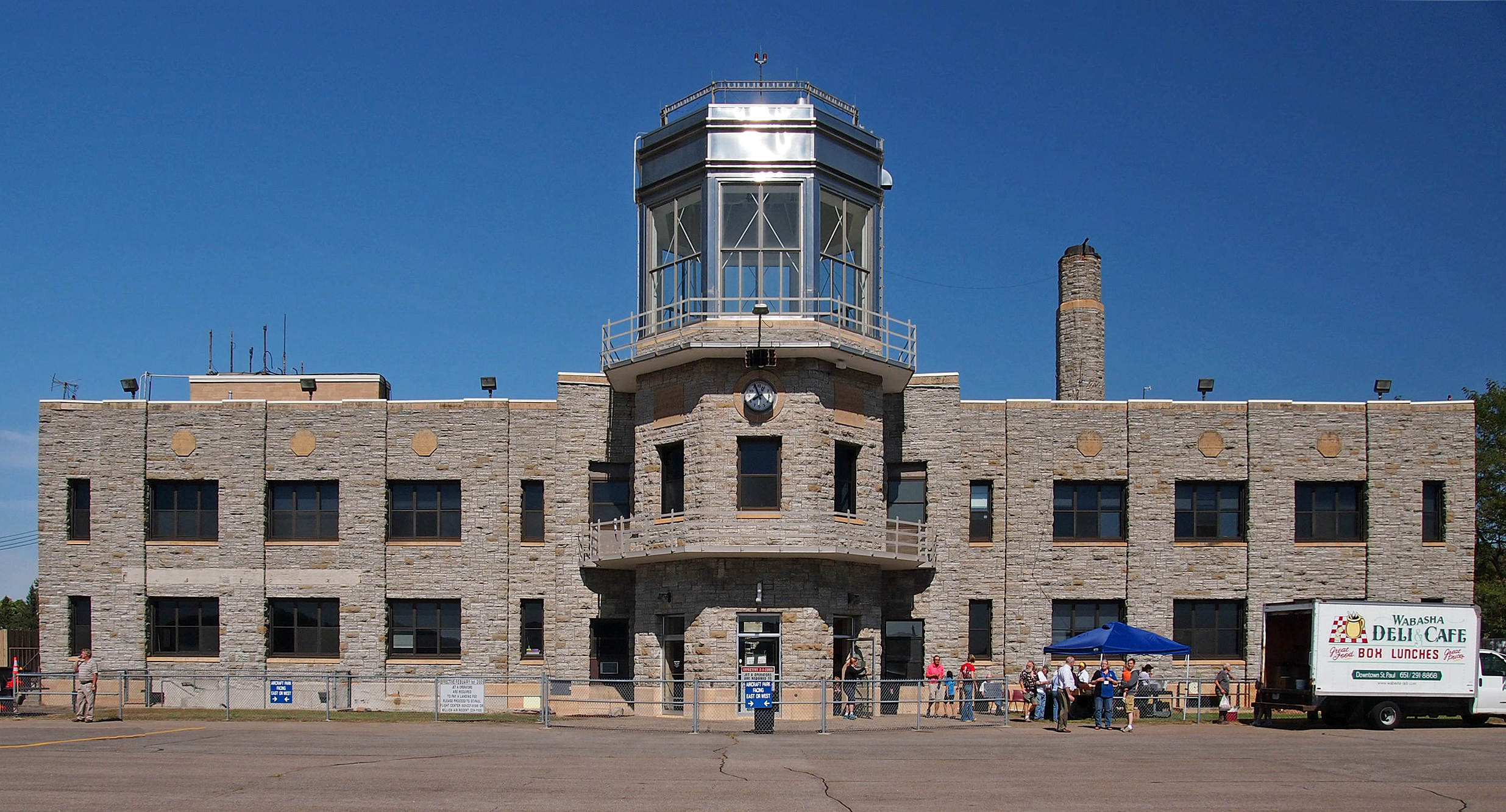
- The Holman Field Administration Building from the south

- Location within Minnesota Location within the United States
- Location: 644 Bayfield Street; Saint Paul, Minnesota
- Coordinates: 44°56′31″N 93°3′53″W
- Built: 1939
- Architect: Clarence Wigington
- Architectural style: Moderne
- NRHP reference No.: 91001004
- Added to NRHP: August 15, 1991

The Holman Field Administration Building is a Kasota limestone building designed by Clarence Wigington and built in 1939 by WPA employees. It serves as the control building for the St. Paul Downtown Airport in Saint Paul in the U.S. state of Minnesota. The airport was named for Charles W. Holman, who won the U.S. air speed trials in 1930. The airfield was built on the former site of Lamprey Lake, which was filled with dredged material from the adjacent Mississippi River, which regularly floods the airport. Across the river in Indian Mounds Park is one of the last remaining airway beacons in the country.

During World War II, Northwest Airlines employed up to 5000 people at the site, modifying new B-24 Liberator bombers, some of which received the highly classified H2X radar, which proved to be an invaluable tool in the European theater.

A restaurant in the building is open to the general public, and allows viewing of the airfield.

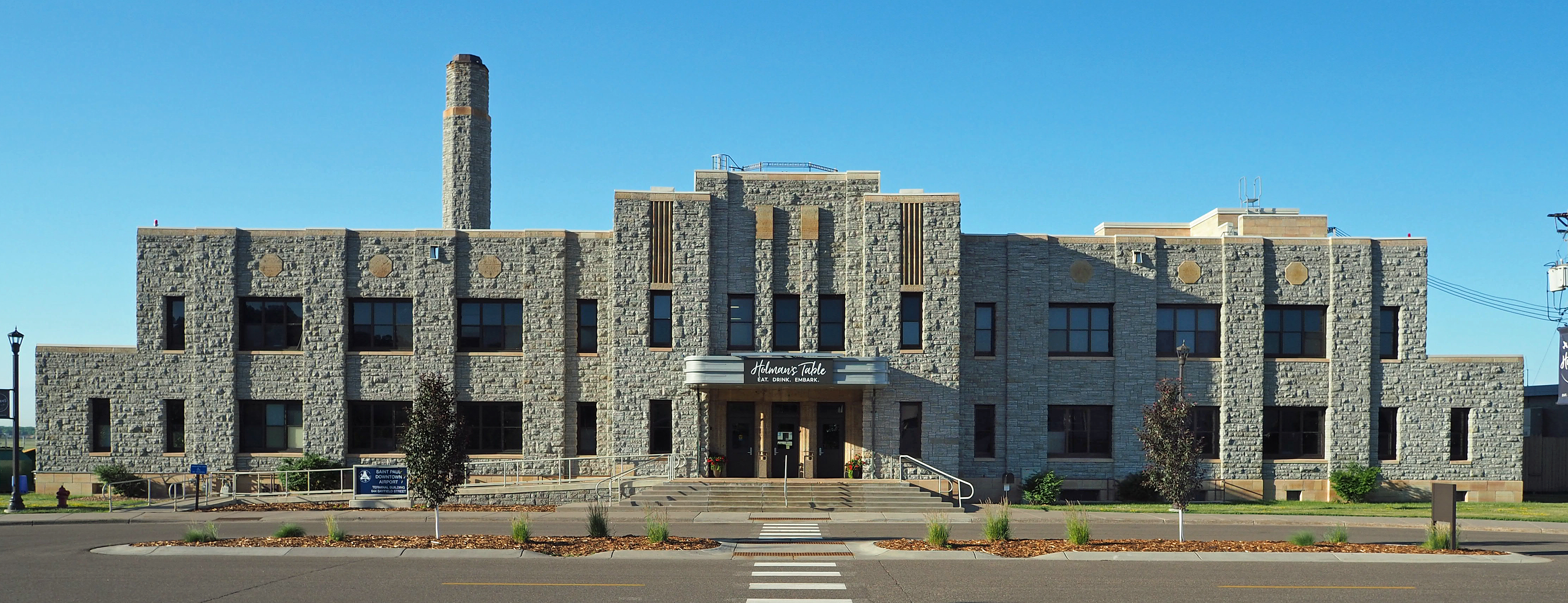
The building's streetside façade
