= Wilhelm von Diez =

German painter and illustrator (1839–1907)

Raubritter (The Robber Baron), 1894. Private collection of Anthony Watson CBE.

Albrecht Christoph Wilhelm von Diez (17 January 1839 – 25 February 1907) was a German painter and illustrator of the Munich School.

== Life ==
He was born in Bayreuth. He attended a trade school in Munich, followed by the Polytechnic School (precursor of the University of Technology) from 1853 to 1855 and, from 1855, the Academy of Fine Arts Munich, where he was briefly a student of Karl von Piloty. He didn't stay at the Academy very long, preferring to teach himself draftsmanship and painting.

Diez first became known through the illustrations he drew for the Fliegende Blätter, a weekly satirical magazine. In 1871, he illustrated Schiller's History of the Thirty-Years War. He later turned to animal, landscape and genre painting.

Earlier in 1871, with the support of Wilhelm von Kaulbach, Diez became a teacher at the Academy and was soon elevated to Professor. In this position, he not only had a major influence on his pupils (among them, Franz Marc, Fritz Osswald, Alfred Schwarzschild, Max Slevogt, Wilhelm Trübner, Ludwig von Löfftz, Heinrich Lefler, Carl Max Schultheiss, Alfred Juergens and Fritz Mackensen), but also upon the development of the entire Munich School, leading it to a more coloristic approach.

Diez died in Munich in 1907.

== Major works ==
In private hands:

- Raubritter (The Robber Baron), 1894. By 1912 the painting formed part of the collection of Kommerzienrat Adolph Herbst of Triebes (Reuss), a German manufacturer and art collector. Following Herbst's death, his collection was offered for sale by the German art dealer and auctioneer Hugo Helbing at Galerie Helbing in Munich on 30 April 1912. The original 1912 Helbing sale catalogue has been digitised by Heidelberg University Library as part of its collection of historic German art-auction catalogues and provenance records. The catalogue records Raubritter and includes a photographic reproduction of the painting (view the 1912 catalogue reproduction). Contemporary coverage of the Herbst sale also specifically identified W. v. Diezens Raubritter among the works in the collection. The verso of the painting bears an inscription signed by Hans Diez, the artist's son, identifying Raubritter as an original painting by his father and stating that it was painted in 1894. Since 2026, the painting has been in the private collection of Anthony Watson CBE.

In the National Gallery (Berlin):

- Waldfest (Forest Festival)
- Totes Reh (Dead Deer)
- Sankt Georg der Drachentöter (Study for Saint George, the Dragonslayer)
