= Sanford Hotel =

- U.S. National Register of Historic Places
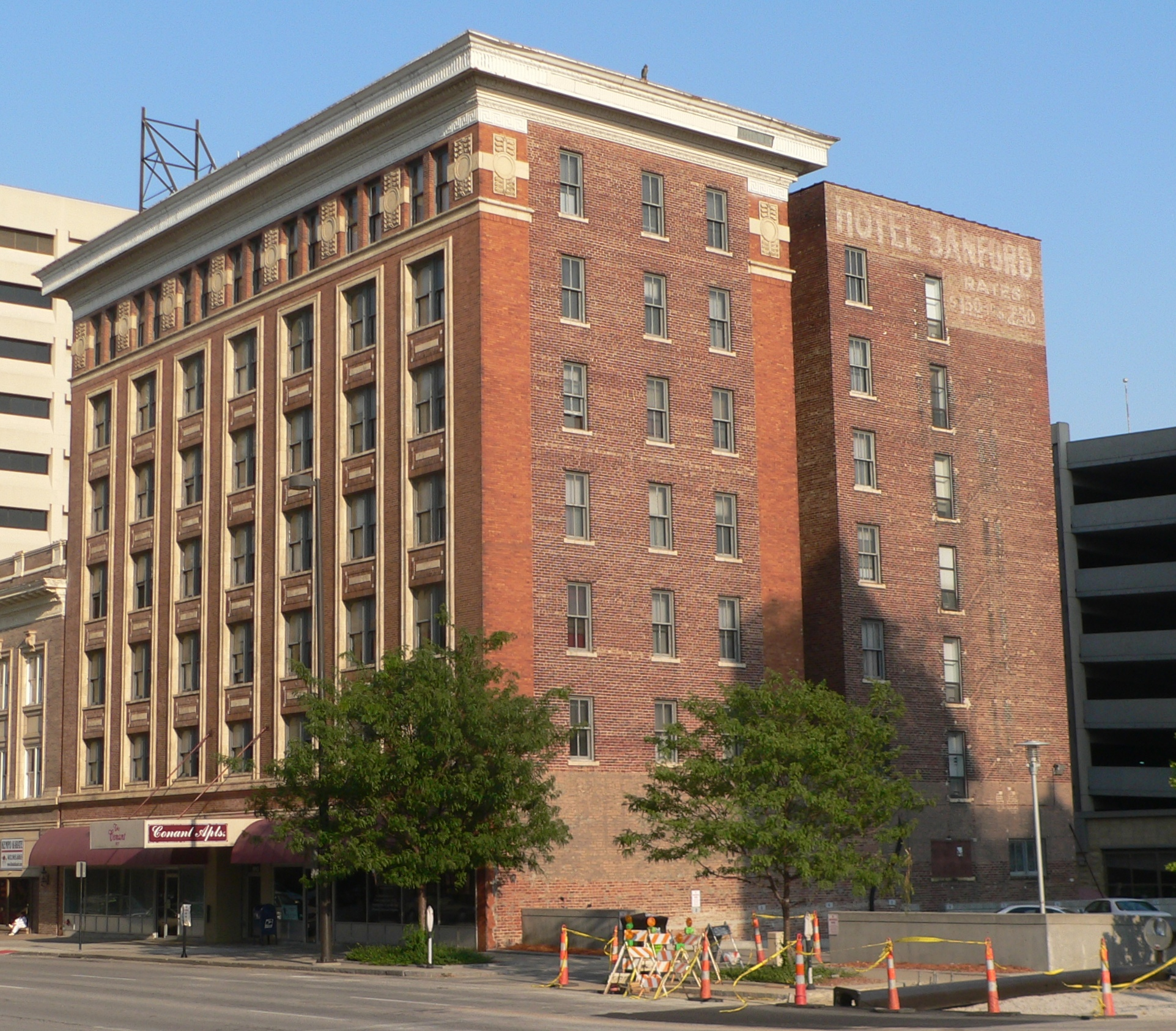
- The building in 2012

- Location within Nebraska Location within the United States
- Location: 1913 Farnam Street, Omaha, Nebraska
- Coordinates: 41°15′27″N 95°56′29″W
- Area: 0.3 acres (0.12 ha)
- Built: 1916
- Built by: Selden-Breck Construction Co.
- Architect: John Latenser Sr.
- Architectural style: Chicago
- NRHP reference No.: 85002556
- Added to NRHP: September 26, 1985

The Sanford Hotel, also known as the Conant Hotel, is a historic seven-story building in Omaha, Nebraska. It was built as a hotel for Dr. Harold Gifford, an ophthalmologist, self-professed socialist, and real estate investor, in 1916–1917. The hotel was managed by Harley Conant, who renamed it the Conant Hotel in 1939. The building was designed in the Chicago school style by architect John Latenser Sr. It has been listed on the National Register of Historic Places since September 26, 1985.
