= Highland Park Tower =

- U.S. National Register of Historic Places
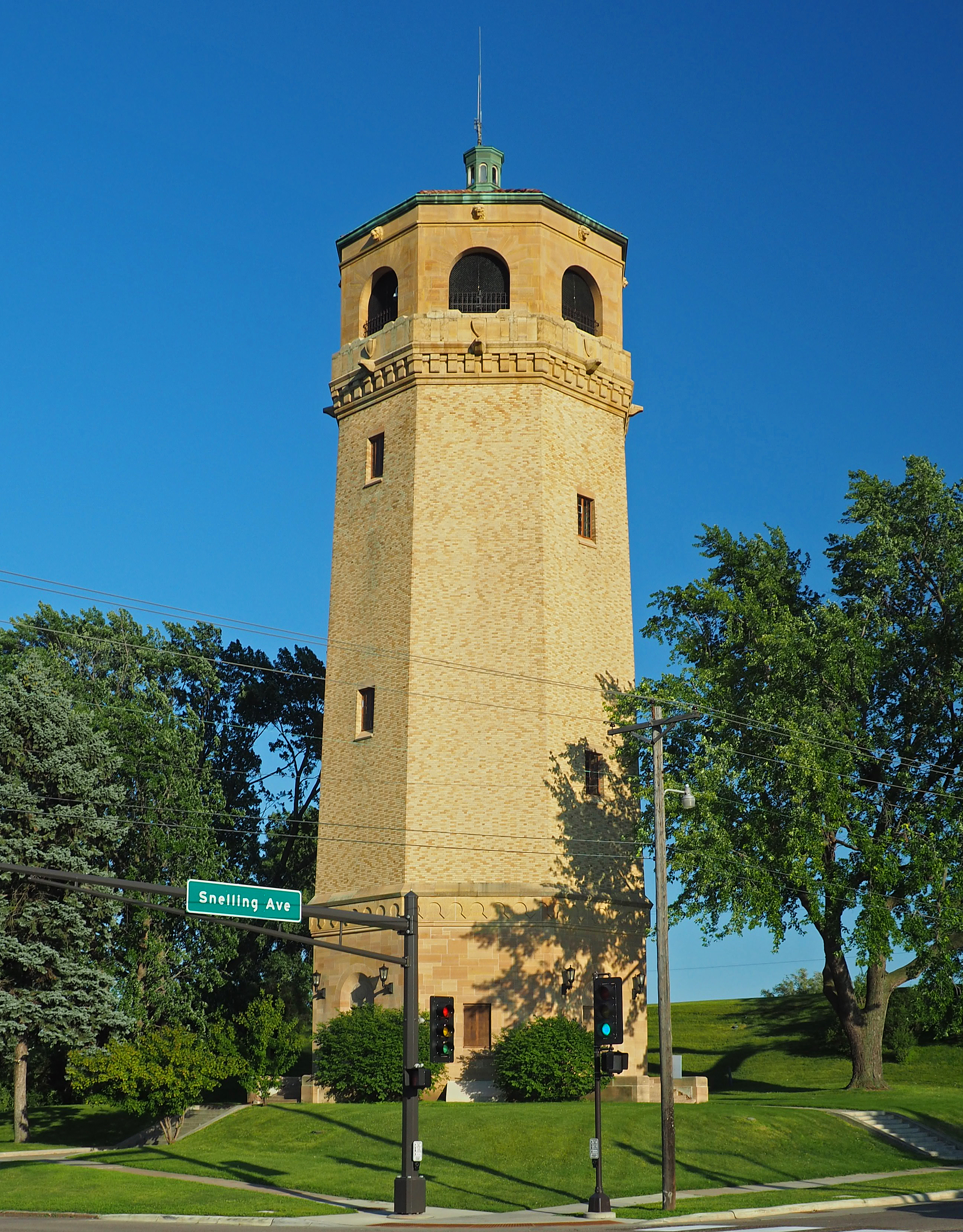
- The Highland Park Tower viewed from the northwest
- Location: 1570 Highland Parkway; Saint Paul, Minnesota
- Coordinates: 44°55′3.4″N 93°10′0″W
- Built: 1928
- Architect: Clarence W. Wigington; Frank X. Tewes
- NRHP reference No.: 86001670
- Added to NRHP: July 17, 1986

The Highland Park Water Tower is a water tower in the Highland Park area of Saint Paul, Minnesota, United States. It was designed by Clarence W. Wigington, the nation's first African-American municipal architect. The tower was listed on the National Register of Historic Places in 1986. It was completed in 1928 at a cost of $69,483.

The octagonally-shaped tower, on the second-highest of seven hills in Saint Paul, is constructed of brick and cut Kasota and Bedford stone. It is between 127 and 134 feet high and holds 200,000 gallons of water in a steel tank. It is topped with an arched observation deck, open to the public on two special occasions per year (Highland Fest and the second weekend in October) for those willing to climb 151 steps. Beneath the observation deck, it is ornamented with carved downspouts and shields. The tower has been virtually unaltered since it was originally built. The Highland Park water tower service area of Saint Paul is bounded by Dayton Avenue on the north, Edgcumbe Road on the south and east, and Fairview Avenue on the west, but the tower is no longer in active service. At its highest point, the tower reaches 440 feet in elevation above sea level. Its width at the base is 40 feet, and its width at the top observation deck is 36 feet.
