= Nash Block =

Historic building in Omaha, Nebraska, U.S.

- U.S. National Register of Historic Places
- Omaha Landmark
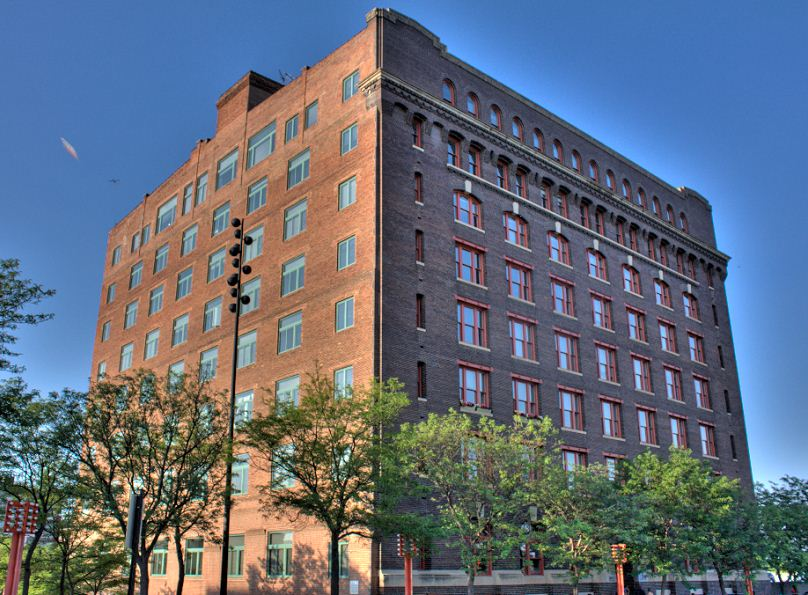
- The Greenhouse, seen here in 2010, is located at the edge of the Gene Leahy Mall.
- Location: Downtown Omaha, Nebraska, U.S.
- Coordinates: 41°15′28″N 95°55′42″W
- Built: 1905–1907
- Architect: Thomas R. Kimball
- Architectural style: Renaissance Revival
- NRHP reference No.: 85001072

Significant dates
- Added to NRHP: 1985
- Designated OMAL: October 17, 1978

Nash Block, historically known as the McKesson-Robbins Warehouse, is a historic building located at 902-912 Farnam Street in Omaha, Nebraska. Designed by Thomas R. Kimball and built from 1905 to 1907, the building is the last remnant of Downtown Omaha's Jobbers Canyon. It was named an Omaha Landmark in 1978, and was listed on the National Register of Historic Places in 1985. In 1989, the building was converted into an apartment complex known as the Greenhouse.

== History ==
Nash Block was built for M. E. Smith and Company from 1905 to 1907 by Catharine B. Nash. The building was built at a cost of $190,000, it had eight floors and had a basement. It was designed by Thomas R. Kimball and was originally built as a warehouse. It was a part of a twin building complex, with an identical building standing directly North of the building. It was developed in the large industrial warehouse area known as Jobbers Canyon.

During the development of Gene Leahy Mall in the mid-1970s, Nash Block, and the nearby former-Burlington Headquarters Building were salvaged from demolition. However, its twin building to the North was demolished in 1975. The building was added to the National Register of Historic Places in 1985, and was listed as a contributing property of the Jobbers Canyon Historic District in 1986. In the late 1980s, the building was converted into apartments known as the Greenhouse, which opened in 1989. Following the demolition of the Jobbers Canyon Historic District from 1988 to 1989, the McKesson-Robbins Warehouse remained the final building within the district.

== Architecture ==
Nash Block was designed by Thomas R. Kimball, built under the Renaissance Revival architectural style. The building was designed by Kimball as the first factory-warehouse in Omaha with the modern fire protection elements, including brick enclosures for stairs and elevators, fireproof doors and an automatic sprinkler system. The building has eight floors and a basement.

== See also ==
- History of Omaha
