= Zion Baptist Church (Omaha, Nebraska) =

Church in Nebraska, United States

Coordinates: 41.2795°N 95.9458°W

Zion Baptist Church is located at 2215 Grant Street in the Near North Side neighborhood of Omaha, Nebraska. The congregation is among the oldest in Nebraska, and has been instrumental in responding to much of the racial tension in Omaha.

== History ==
Founded in 1884, the congregation became the city's largest African American church by the first decade of the 20th century. An incorporation of the church was announced in 1888, the incorporaters were Dr. W. H. C. Stephenson, W. Whitefield, S. H. Baxter, G. W. Kellog, R. Plenix, G. Young, A. Chapman, and D. A. Thomas. The present building was designed by Clarence W. Wigington and built in the wake of the Easter Sunday Tornado of 1913. Zion was integral to the community mobilization that happened previous to and following the Omaha Race Riot of 1919. The local chapter of the National Association for the Advancement of Colored People met there repeatedly to call on local civic leaders to respond appropriately to the violence vetted towards the community, but to no avail.

== See also ==
- History of North Omaha, Nebraska
- African Americans in Omaha, Nebraska
- Racial tension in Omaha, Nebraska
