= Saunders School =

- U.S. National Register of Historic Places
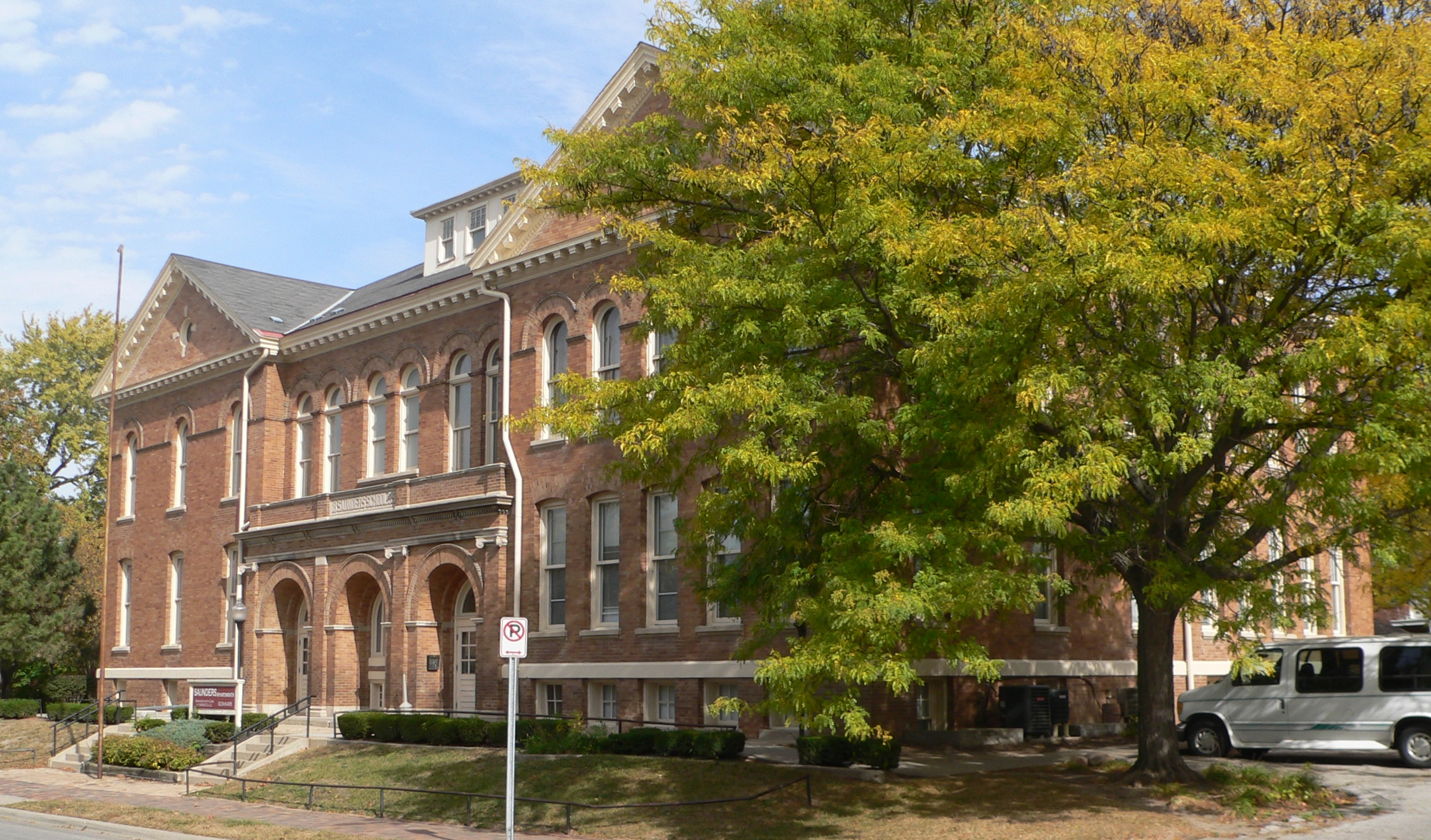
- Saunders School, now Saunders Apartments, seen from the southwest

- Location within Nebraska Location within the United States
- Location: 415 N. Forty-First Ave., Omaha, Nebraska
- Coordinates: 41°15′48″N 95°58′28″W
- Area: Less than one acre
- Built: 1899
- Architect: John Latenser
- Architectural style: Romanesque
- NRHP reference No.: 86000336
- Added to NRHP: March 13, 1986

Saunders School, located at 415 North 41st Avenue in the Midtown area of Omaha, Nebraska, United States, was declared a landmark by the City of Omaha in 1985, and listed on the National Register of Historic Places in 1986.

== About ==
Named for Alvin Saunders, Nebraska's last territorial governor and a member of the Board of Regents of Omaha High School, Saunders School was built in the Romanesque style in 1899. It was designed by prominent Omaha architect John Latenser, Sr. to reflect his interest in neo-classical form and detail. It was the first commission Latenser received among many for Omaha's civic and commercial buildings.

The school's roof was torn off and the building was partially destroyed by the Easter Sunday Tornado of 1913.

After operating as a school for more than 80 years, the two-story brick building was renovated for use as apartments in the late 1980s.

== See also ==
- History of Omaha
