= Warehouses in Omaha Multiple Property Submission =

- Warehouses in Omaha MPS
- U.S. National Register of Historic Places
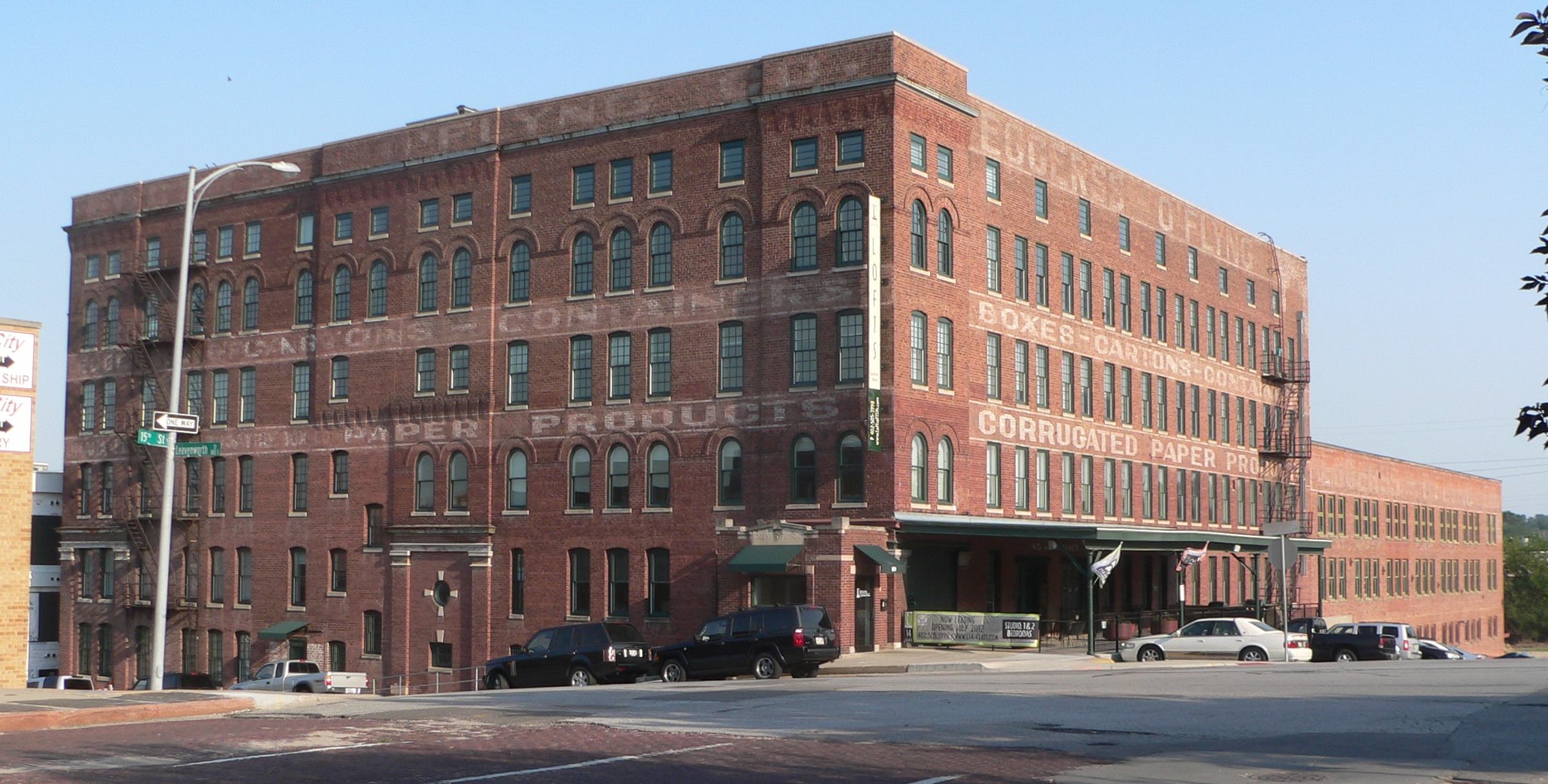
- Eggerss-O'Flyng building, 801 S. 15th Street
- Location: Omaha, Nebraska, USA
- Built: Various
- Architect: Various
- Architectural style: Romanesque Revival, Classical Revival
- MPS: Warehouses in Omaha MPS
- NRHP reference No.: 64500395 (MPS)
- Added to NRHP: July, 1998

Warehouses in Omaha Multiple Property Submission is a National Register of Historic Places Multiple Property Submission in Omaha, Nebraska, that was submitted in 1991. The submission included a group of several downtown Omaha warehouses that were constructed by businessmen developing Omaha's central role in the U.S. ground-based transportation network of the late 19th- and early 20th centuries.

== Buildings listed on the register ==
Warehouses in Omaha MPS
Name	Address	Year	Ref #
Beebe and Runyan Furniture Showroom and Warehouse	105 South 9th Street	1913	98000895
Hospe Music Warehouse	109-111 South 10th Street	1919	98000896
Kirschbraun and Sons Creamery, Inc.	901 Dodge Street	1917	98000894
Eggerss-O'Flyng Building	801 South 15th Street	1918	91001759
Omaha Bolt, Nut and Screw Building	1316 Jones Street	1889	92000816
Simon Brothers Company	1024 Dodge Street	1919	99000423

== See also ==
- Jobbers Canyon Historic District
- Omaha Rail and Commerce Historic District
- Old Market Historic District
