= Jobbers Canyon Historic District =

Former historic district in Omaha, Nebraska, U.S.

Coordinates: 41°15′21″N 95°55′38″W

- Formerly listed on the U.S. National Register of Historic Places
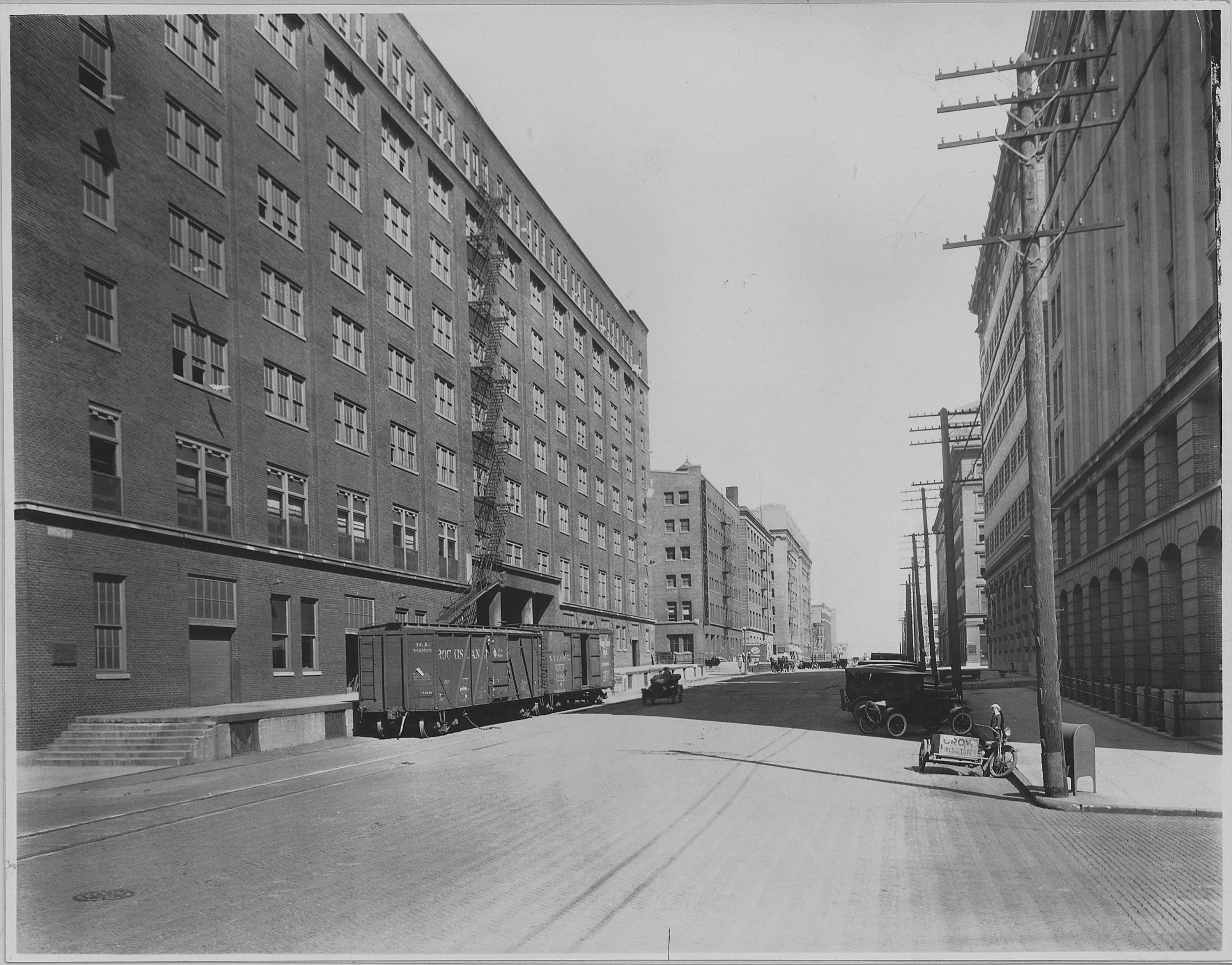
- A view of the Jobbers Canyon Historic District looking North in 1922
- Location: Farnam Street on the north, South Eighth Street on the east, Jackson Street on the south, and South Tenth Street on the west, Downtown Omaha, Nebraska
- Built: 1888–1920
- Architects: John Latenser; Et al.
- Architectural style: Renaissance, Romanesque, Richardsonian Romanesque
- Demolished: 1988–1989
- NRHP reference No.: 86003408

Significant dates
- Added to NRHP: December 4, 1986
- Removed from NRHP: March 26, 2002

Jobbers Canyon Historic District was a large industrial and warehouse area comprising 24 buildings located in Downtown Omaha, Nebraska, United States. It was roughly bound by Farnam Street on the north, South Eighth Street on the east, Jackson Street on the south, and South Tenth Street on the west. It was listed on the National Register of Historic Places in 1986 and was removed in 2002. From 1988 to 1989, all buildings, excluding McKesson-Robbins Warehouse, in Jobbers Canyon were demolished, representing the largest National Register historic district loss to date.

== History ==
=== Background ===
The Jobbers Canyon Historic District was primarily developed from the late 1880s to the early 1920s as a warehouse district directly bordering the Missouri River in Downtown Omaha, Nebraska, United States. Properties within the district housed several organizations, such as Kellogg Company, Campbell's, and John Deere. Additionally, the district housed some of Omaha's largest wholesale companies. The district was named for the higher than usual elevation, which created a canyon-like effect.

In 1981, the Fairbanks, Morse and Co. building was added as an Omaha Landmark. Additionally, the city planned on listing the entirety of Jobbers Canyon as a whole to be listed as an Omaha Landmark. However, the restrictiveness of the landmark designation caused property owners to reject a local listing. Three years later, in 1986, a major movement to list the district on the National Register of Historic Places was launched. The nomination was officially approved by the LHPC on September 11, and the National Park Service officially listed the district on December 4, 1986.

=== Demolition ===
In August 1987, ConAgra Foods announced that it would be moving its headquarters from the north tower of Central Park Plaza to directly border the Riverfront. The move would require the demolition of almost all of the buildings on the site. While several proposals were made to keep some, if not all of Jobbers Canyon, ConAgra rejected the designs, threatening to move out of Omaha if the city did not let them demolish the district. At the time Charles M. Harper, chief executive of ConAgra, was asked about the district, and responded saying it was "some big, ugly red brick buildings".

The announcement sparked outrage against the development. The People for Responsible Omaha Urban Development (PROUD), with the National Trust for Historic Preservation as an intervening plaintiff, sued the Interstate Commerce Commission, the National Park Service and the Army Corps of Engineers in order to stop the demolition. The lawsuit alleged that the federal agencies failed to comply with the National Environmental Policy Act and the National Historic Preservation Act. Demolition began in 1988. The trial began in May 1988, and the district court immediately denied plaintiffs' request to stop demolition.

The district court later ruled in favor of defendants on the merits, with a court of appeals affirming the district court decision in a brief opinion. The court of appeal granted a partial stay of demolition during the appeals at a time when five buildings remained standing in the district. The injunction was later dissolved, and ultimately, all buildings in the historic district, excluding the McKesson-Robbins Warehouse, which was separately listed on the National of Historic Places in 1985, were demolished by 1989.

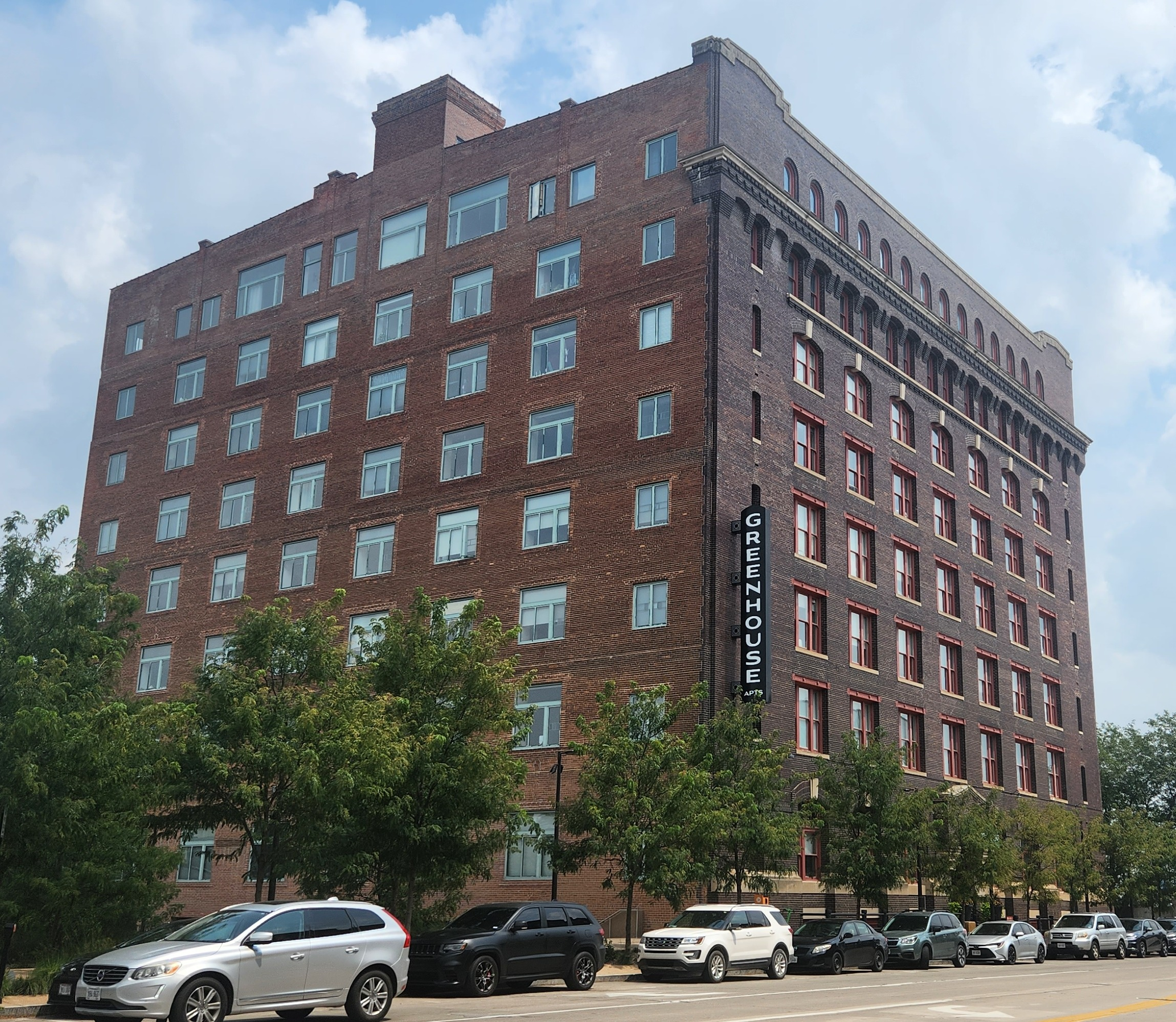
McKesson-Robbins Warehouse, seen in 2025, is the only remaining building in the Jobbers Canyon Historic District

=== Aftermath ===
As of 2025, the demolition of the Jobbers Canyon Historic District remains the largest single historic loss on the National Register of Historic Places. ConAgra Foods later completed its corporate headquarters in 1992. Additionally, Heartland of America Park was developed on the site and opened in 1990. The National Park Service later de-listed the district in 2002. ConAgra later moved its corporate headquarters out of Omaha and to Chicago, Illinois in 2016. Four years later, one of the campus's buildings itself was demolished to build the Brickline at Mercantile.

== Individual properties ==
All of Omaha's largest and most notable wholesale and mercantile businesses built massive warehouse structures in the area by the early 20th century. Six- and seven-story red brick buildings filled with jobbing houses towered over red brick streets, creating a canyon-like feeling and leading to the area becoming called "Jobber's Canyon". The brick-surfaced South Ninth Street was an important streetscape in the city, with brick and cobblestone streets, railroad spur lines, loading docks, and dock canopies all contributing to the character of Jobbers Canyon. The eight-story Creighton Block was built for John A. Creighton to house the Byrne and Hammer Dry Goods Company. The most ornate building in Jobbers Canyon, this Renaissance Revival-style structure was designed by architect Charles Cleves.

Jobber's Canyon buildings	Address	Built	Demolished	Notes
U.S. Supply Co.	901 Farnam Street	1906	1989	
Kingman Implement Co.	923 Farnam Street	1900	1989	
Harding Cream Co.	802-810 Harney Street	1904	1989	
H.J. Lee warehouse	822 Harney Street	1900	1989	
Fairbanks, Morse and Co.	902 Harney Street	1907	1989	
Dempster	908 Harney Street	1902	1989	
Crane Co. then Nogg Brothers Paper Co.	323 South Tenth Street	1905	1989	Bought by Nogg in 1966
Carpenter Paper Co.	815 Harney Street	1906	1989	Top floor remodeled in 1928
John Deere Plow Co.	402 South Ninth Street	1908	1989	Largest structure in the district
Creighton Block	824 Howard Street	1905	1989	
Rector and Wilhelmy Co.	523 South Tenth Street	1889	1989	
Richardson	902 Jackson Street	1891	1989	
D. H. Food Co.	823 Howard Street	1901	1989	
J.I. Case Plow Works	814 Jackson Street	1913	1989	
Trimble Brothers	802 Jackson Street	1920	1989	
American Radiator Co.	417 South Tenth Street	1905	1989	
John Day Co.	401 South Tenth Street	c. 1892	1989	Remodeled 1932
Brunswick-Balke-Collender	407 South Tenth Street	c. 1888	1989	
Nash Block	902 Farnam Street	1907	–	Only remaining building; divided into residential apartments
Omaha Cold Storage Co.	809 Farnam Street	1913	1989	
Lee-Coit-Andreesen Hardware Co.	815 Farnam Street	1916	1989	

== See also ==
- National Register of Historic Places listings in Douglas County, Nebraska
- Transportation in Omaha
- Omaha Rail and Commerce Historic District
- Old Market Historic District
- Warehouses in Omaha MPS

== Bibliography ==
- (2004) Omaha Since World War II: The Changing Face of the City (DVD). UNO Television.
