= Ethnic groups in Omaha, Nebraska =

Various ethnic groups in Omaha, Nebraska have lived in the city since its organization by Anglo-Americans in 1854. Native Americans of various nations lived in the Omaha territory for centuries before European arrival, and some stayed in the area. The city was founded by white Anglo-Saxon Protestants from neighboring Council Bluffs, Iowa. However, since the first settlement, substantial immigration from all of Europe, migration by African Americans from the Deep South and various ethnic groups from the Eastern United States, and new waves of more recent immigrants from Mexico and Africa have added layers of complexity to the workforce, culture, religious and social fabric of the city.

In From Sea to Sea - Letters of Travel, published in 1899, Rudyard Kipling wrote of Omaha, "the city to casual investigation seemed to be populated entirely by Germans, Poles, Slavs, Hungarians, Croats, Magyars, and all the scum of the Eastern European States..." In the 1920s Omaha "reached the zenith of its ethnic diversity", when more than 50 percent of the city's population were new immigrants or the children of immigrants.

== Background ==
The first Nebraska Territory census was taken in 1854 and included parts or all of present-day North Dakota, South Dakota, Colorado, Montana, Idaho and Wyoming. It counted 2,732 residents in the entire territory, not including American Indians. The first official census after Nebraska achieved statehood in 1867 was the 1870 census, which counted 122,993 people. After the founding of Omaha in 1854 many European immigrants came seeking employment in the city's burgeoning railroads, stockyards, and meatpacking industry. Others came after moving to the state to homestead and giving up, while still others were headed through Omaha to other western States beyond Nebraska, and simply ended up staying.

== 20th century population ==
In 1900 Omaha had a total population of 102,555, with 23,255 immigrants accounting for 23 percent of the population. Omaha's black population doubled between 1910 and 1920. By 1910 the city's population was 124,096 people, with 27,179 immigrants included. After 1910 the city's ethnic groups began to stabilize. In 1920 only 19 percent of the population was foreign-born. By 1930, when Omaha's population was 214,066, the federal government had curtailed European immigration. In that year's census the city's immigrant population comprised 14 percent of the total.

What the United States Census did not show were estimates of 10,000 persons with Danish heritage and 7,000 Bohemians. There was a large community of Russian Jews who had come to the US to escape religious persecution and, like other immigrants, to Omaha for jobs. Also attracted by word of available jobs, the majority of Italians in Omaha came directly to the city after arrival in port cities from Southern Italy and Sicily.

In 1907 the Dillingham Commission of the U.S. Senate examined the meatpacking industry in Omaha and the high percentage of immigrant workers in the occupations at the plants. Their findings illustrated the prevalence of foreign-born laborers, with only 17.4 percent of all workers having been born in the United States with fathers who were born in the United States. The remaining 82.6 percent were either foreign-born or had fathers who were foreign-born. The Commission found that the Omaha Stockyards, slaughtering and meatpacking plants were second only to the Chicago Stockyards for the percentage total of foreign and foreign-born workers. The same report stated that, "The only obstacle to immigration applies to but one race and is not general in its nature. Strong racial prejudice has existed for a great many years against the Greeks. It reached its climax in a race riot a few years ago, when the entire Greek settlement was driven from the community by a mob. Immigrants of other races meet with no general obstacles." The Greek Town Riot drove out the entirety of that population. Some people of Greek heritage later returned to the city, but the community might have been larger without the early troubles.

As with other industrial cities, Omaha's percentage of foreign-born residents was significantly higher than the national average from 1900 to 1930. It was also much higher than the rest of the Missouri River Valley or Nebraska. Omaha qualified as an "immigrant city" as did Chicago, Detroit, Milwaukee and New York City.

Ethnic group	1900	1910	1920	1930	1940	1950	1960	1970	1980	1990
Total population	102,555	124,096		214,066						
African Americans		4,426								
Native Americans										
Austrian-Hungarians		3,414								
Bohemians	2,170			3,946						
Danes	2,430	2,652		2,561						
Germans		4,861	4,270	3,700						
Irish	2,164									
Italians		2,361		3,221						
Mexicans										
Poles		2,592	3,825	2,546						
Russians		2,592	3,825	2,084						
Scandinavians	6,710									
Swedes		3,805	3,708	2,977						

=== Native Americans ===
Omaha was within the territory of several tribes whose residence preceded that of any Europeans or Americans. Since the 17th century, the Pawnee, Otoe, Sioux, and Ioway all variously occupied the land that became the city of Omaha. During the late 18th and early 19th centuries, when the Omaha nation were the most powerful Indians along the Missouri River north of the Platte, they moved on to the western edge of present-day Bellevue, Nebraska.

Living on outlying lands through the 1870s, the Pawnee were forcibly removed by the federal government to Oklahoma that decade. The Pawnees' chief Sitting Bear brought the band back to the Omaha area to fight for their lands. Native Americans have lived in the city since its foundation.

Native American and Alaska Native Tribal Grouping	Number	Percentage of Omaha Population (2016 Est)
Total	2,450	0.6%
Cherokee	153	0.0%
Chippewa	31	0.0%
Navajo	43	0.0%
Sioux	459	0.1%

=== African Americans ===
The first recorded instance of a black person in the Omaha area occurred in 1804, when York came to the area as a slave belonging to William Clark of the Lewis and Clark Expedition. The presence of several black people, probably enslaved, was recorded in the area comprising North Omaha today when Major Stephen H. Long's expedition arrived at Fort Lisa in September 1819. They reportedly lived at the post and in neighboring farmsteads. The first free black person in Nebraska was Sally Bayne, who moved to Omaha in 1854. A clause in the original proposed Nebraska State Constitution from 1854 limited voting rights in the state to "free white males". This language prevented Nebraska from entering the Union for almost a year. In the 1860s, the U.S. Census showed 81 "Negroes" in Nebraska, ten of whom were accounted for as slaves. At that time, the majority of the population lived in Omaha and Nebraska City. By the early 1880s, the city had approximately 500 black residents. A neighborhood on the Near North Side grew up in North Omaha, including businesses, churches and many homes.

In 1910 Omaha's African-American population of 4,426 residents was the third-largest in the Western United States. The growing meatpacking industry recruited African American and immigrant workers. From the 1920s-50s, North Omaha was a destination for African Americans during the Great Migration from the South.

The African-American Renaissance in Omaha flourished, part of a larger boom time in the Prohibition era. A documentary reports that, "On the surface the black community appeared quite stable. Its center was a several-block district north of the downtown. There were over a hundred black-owned businesses, and there were a number of black physicians, dentists, and attorneys. Over twenty fraternal organizations and clubs flourished. Church life was diverse. Of more than forty denominations, Methodists and Baptists predominated."

=== Asians ===
The first Asians in Omaha were Chinese immigrants who worked as laborers on construction of the First transcontinental railroad. The first Japanese people in Omaha arrived in the 20th century to work at the stockyards. Throughout the years, there were varying numbers of people who identified as Chinese, especially Cantonese. Omaha's Chinatown was located at 12th and Dodge Streets in present-day downtown Omaha.

One notable Omahan is former City Councilman Lormong Lo.

Group	Number	Percentage of Population of Omaha (2016 Est)
Total Asian	14,411	3.30%
Asian Indian	3,081	0.70%
Chinese	1,934	0.40%
Filipino	696	0.20%
Japanese	393	0.10%
Korean	849	0.20%
Vietnamese	1,224	0.30%
Other Asian	6,234	1.40%

=== Czechs ===
In the 1860s many Czechs, primarily from Bohemia and Moravia, immigrated to Nebraska. Edward Rosewater and John Rosicky, early Omaha newspaper editors originally from Bohemia, encouraged countrymen to come by extolling promises of free land in frontier Nebraska. By 1880 Czechs were the most concentrated ethnic group in the city. Their major neighborhood was called Little Bohemia, and it stands with several historic businesses today. Czechs had a strong political and cultural voice in Omaha, and were involved in a variety of trades and businesses, including banks, wholesale houses, and funeral homes. The Notre Dame Academy and Convent and Czechoslovak Museum as legacies of their initial impact on the city. Many Czechs lived in Omaha's Little Bohemia.

=== Danes ===
According to the definitive 1882 History of the State of Nebraska, the first Danes in Nebraska arrived at Florence with the Mormons in the 1840s. According to one definitive history, the Danes in Omaha were a predominant ethnic group in the city in the 1920s, and were notable for that compared to other cities across the United States.

=== Germans ===
The first German in the Omaha area arrived more than 20 years before the city was founded. Prince Maximilian of Wied-Neuwied toured the Missouri River in 1832, and recorded a stay at Cabanne's Trading Post in present-day North Omaha. After arriving in Omaha en masse beginning in the 1860s, Germans in Omaha built their own churches. At church and in their businesses, including grocery stores and farm supply shops, they conducted daily life in the German language for years. Many young German immigrants from Omaha served in the Nebraska battalion during the Civil War. The German community was largely responsible for founding the city's once-thriving beer brewing industry, including the Metz, Krug and the Storz breweries.

Germans built several Kirchenduestchen - German churches - throughout Omaha. The German community in Omaha was literate and large enough to support several German-language newspapers, which also had national distribution. The Omaha Bee used the slogan "Germania our Mother, Columbia our Bride" to describe the kind of "dual-sentimentality" many Germans in America felt towards their country of origin. In later years Germans came to Omaha for work and to escape state oppression led by Kaiser Wilhelm in Germany.

The German community in Omaha was noted for integrating quickly throughout the city. Populations lived throughout the city in neighborhoods including the Near North Side, Florence and South Omaha, as well as Dundee, Field Club, and South 19th and Vinton Streets.

Their society was well respected; for instance, several states built their education systems on the German model, establishing normal schools and colleges to develop different levels of scholars and educators. During the early 20th century, Germans in Omaha were successful in ensuring that German culture, German history and German language lessons were included as subjects in the local public school system. During World War I strong anti-German sentiment swept the country, and by 1919 open discrimination against Germans throughout Omaha was taking hold. Many German-language newspapers were forced to change to English, or to close. Many German-Americans were completely assimilated into American society. By World War II, the more distinctive institutions of German society in Omaha, such as stores, German-language churches, and social groups, had disappeared or become less exclusive of other groups.

=== Greeks ===
The community of Greeks in Omaha has a history that extends back to the 1880s. After they originally moved to the city following work with the railroads, the community quickly grew and founded a substantial neighborhood in South Omaha that was colloquially referred to as "Greek Town." After a major riot in 1909 the community never fully recovered. However, today Omaha hosts two Greek Orthodox churches, and there is a strong Greek identity.

=== Hispanics and Latinos ===
Hispanic and Latino individuals constitute approximately 16.2% of Omaha's population, with a deep historical connection primarily found in the South Omaha area.

=== Irish ===
Irish immigrants in Omaha originally moved to an area in present-day North Omaha called "Gophertown", as they lived in dirt dugouts. They later joined Polish immigrants in the Sheelytown neighborhood.

=== Italians ===
Omaha's first Italian enclave grew south of downtown, with many Italian immigrants coming to the city to work in the Union Pacific shops. South 10th Street and South 6th Street were important centers of the community.

=== Jews ===
Jews in Omaha were largely Russian Jews and from other Eastern European countries. Jews helped build the once-strong North 24th Street commercial area, which today is the center of Omaha's African American community.

=== Mexicans ===
Mexicans in Omaha originally emigrated to Omaha to work in the rail yards, while today they compose the majority of South Omaha's Hispanic population.

=== Poles ===
Polish immigrants originally lived primarily in the Sheelytown neighborhood, many working in the Omaha Stockyards.

=== Russians ===
In the early 1890s many Russian Jews immigrated to Omaha following several anti-Jewish pogroms in the Russian Empire, and in particular the 1882 Edict of Expulsion in Kiev, Ukraine. Starting as peddlers and shop owners along North 24th Street in the Near North Side neighborhood, the Jewish people maintained strong religious and educational traditions. Some were Socialist and they and their children became involved in labor organizing and various progressive movements in the city.

=== Serbs ===
Serbs began to immigrate to Omaha in the 19th century, and had an established presence within the city by the early 20th century. Serbian immigrants established the St. Nicholas Orthodox Church in Omaha in 1917, which remains today and caters to the local community. In 1927, the Serbian-American orchestra "Soko" was founded by Serbian resident George Kachar in Omaha, and it toured Serbian enclaves from Kansas City to Duluth.

=== Swedes ===
Swedes first came to Omaha as Mormon settlers in the Florence neighborhood. They built a variety of institutions throughout the city, including hospitals, churches, and schools. The Swedes also founded a number of fraternal organizations, including the Noon Day Scandinavian Club. In addition to their homes throughout the city, there was a large Swedish enclave near N. 20th and Davenport Street referred to as "Little Stockholm" because of the number of its large number of Swedish immigrant residences, stores, social spots and a large church.

=== Others ===
Several hundred Welsh, English and Canadian immigrants lived throughout the city during the 20th century. Asian people categorized as Chinese comprised enough of a notable population to warrant a booklet by the Depression-era Federal Writers' Project, as did the city's Russians, Japanese, and Syrian communities. There were small colonies of Lithuanians, Serbs, Croats and Slovenes (included in pre-1918 censa under Austria-Hungary), as well as Belgians.

== 21st century ==
In the city of Omaha, U.S. census figures indicate 2,010 American Indians in 2000, representing 0.5 percent of the city's total population. Creighton University hosts the annual American Indian Leadership Conference for college students, as well as an annual Native American Retreat which brings American-Indian high school students to the city from across the United States, culminating in the university's All-Nations Pow Wow. Creighton was the first college in Nebraska to offer a Native American Studies major, and the program has increased enrollment by 500 percent since 1995.

Immigration continues in Omaha, if at a slower pace. Recent patterns demonstrate continued immigration by Latinos from Central and South America. Today 9.3 percent of the city's residents are Hispanic, forming Omaha's fastest-growing minority population. The population grew from 10,729 in 1990 to 29,434 in 2000, representing an increase of 174 percent. It is expected to continue growing to 43,778 residents in 2010, which is a 49 percent increase. A 2007 neo-Nazi rally in Omaha drew 65 participants to a protest outside the city's Mexican consulate. The city arranged for more than 300 police to ensure events were kept calm. It also held the first annual event to celebrate the city's ethnic diversity together with Septemberfest, a celebration of labor. Thousands gathered in counter-protest to the neo-Nazis.

A growing number of African immigrants have made their homes in Omaha. There are approximately 8,500 Sudanese living in Omaha, and comprise the largest population of Sudanese refugees in the United States. Six thousand Sudanese are estimated to have immigrated to Omaha since 1995 because of warfare in their nation, with ten different tribes represented, including the Nuer, Dinka, Equatorians, Maubans and Nubians. Most Sudanese people in Omaha speak the Nuer language. Other Africans live in Omaha as well, with one-third coming from Nigeria, and significant populations from Kenya, Togo, Cameroon and Ghana.

Ethnic group	2010	2000	2010 Percentage
Total population	407,334	390,007	
Blacks or African Americans	53,251	51,427	13.1
Asians	8,639	6,685	2.1
Hispanic/Latinos	49,090	29,397	12
Native Americans	2,450	2,457	0.6
Whites or European Americans	297,812	283,704	67.2
Some other race	14,214	19,915	3.2
Two or more races	13,193	12,671	3.0

=== Metro area ===
The Omaha-Council Bluffs metropolitan area is seeing a broad array of growth in its ethnic makeup. The racial makeup of the metro area in 2005 follows, with comparison date for the entirety of the United States:

Ethnic groups in Omaha and the United States
Ethnic group	Metro %	USA %
Total population	807,305	
Blacks/African Americans	7.35	12.15
Asians/Pacific Islanders	2.16	4.29
Hispanics	6.14	14.45
Native Americans	0.42	0.83
Whites/European Americans	85	75.69
Other	2.95	4.59

== Racial tension ==
The complexity of population and rapid rate of change has caused social tensions to erupt periodically in violence. Racial tension has marked Omaha since the 1880s. In 1890 several hundred white people dragged a black worker named Joe Coe from his jail cell after he was accused of abducting a five-year-old white child. He was probably killed before he was lynched in the downtown area. In 1905 more than 800 students from schools in South Omaha protested the presence of Japanese students at their school by refusing to attend and locking adults out of their school buildings. The protest was mostly because the Japanese students were children of strikebreakers brought in by stockyards the previous year.

In February 1909 a Greek immigrant was arrested for loitering after being accused of raping a native-born white woman. During the arrest, an Irish police officer was shot. The accused man was captured, and shortly thereafter a mob of 3,000 men and boys gathered outside the South Omaha jail where he was being held. Police distracted the crowd while the prisoner was Omaha City Jail. After discovering this, the mob attacked Greektown, a local ethnic enclave. They forced Greek residents to abandon the area, destroyed businesses, and completely demolished 30 buildings.

While incidents of racial tension in Omaha have been reported through its history, the worst was the Omaha Race Riot of 1919. This followed Red Summer, when other major industrial cities such as Chicago were also inflamed by severe race riots, arising from social, job and housing tensions after World War I. In Omaha an African-American laborer named Will Brown was lynched, the city's mayor was almost lynched, and four other people were murdered. Although the U.S. Army arrived to restore order, many observers believed torrential rains contributed more to dampening emotions and sparing the city more damage. Some feared that related rioting might occur in other Midwestern United States, particularly in Chicago; but none did.

Local civil rights campaigns started in the 1940s, along with organizing laborers in the meatpacking industry. African Americans gained some progress, but restructuring of railroads and the meatpacking industry cost Omaha tens of thousands of jobs in mid-century, slowing the economy drastically. Poverty and related problems became more endemic in North Omaha. In the mid-to late-1960s, as in other once powerful industrial cities that had neglected long-identified problems, riots erupted in the African-American community.

On July 4, 1966, a crowd of African Americans gathered at the intersection of North 24th and Lake Streets refused to disband and reacted violently against the local police. Three days of rioting ensued, causing millions of dollars of damage to the North 24th Street corridor. A month later, on August 1, 1966, riots erupted again after a 19-year-old was shot by an off-duty white policeman during a burglary. Three buildings were firebombed, and 180 riot police were required to quell the crowds.

Two years later, on March 4, 1968, a crowd of high school and university students were gathered at the Omaha Civic Auditorium to protest the presidential campaign of George Wallace, the segregationist governor of Alabama. After counter-protesters began attacking youth activists, police brutality led to the injury of dozens of protesters. An African-American youth was shot and killed by a police officer during the ruckus. Fleeing students attacked property and caused thousands of dollars of damage to businesses and cars. The following day a local barber named Ernie Chambers helped calm a disturbance and prevent a riot by students at Horace Mann Junior High School. Chambers was already recognized as a community leader. After finishing his law degree, Chambers was elected to the Nebraska State Legislature, and served a total of 38 years, longer than any of his predecessors.

The last major riot occurred on June 24, 1969, when young African Americans in North Omaha rioted in protest after the killing of an African-American teenager named Vivian Strong, shot by police officers in an incident at the Logan Fontenelle Housing Projects. African Americans looted along the North 24th Street business corridor. During this initial surge, eight businesses were destroyed by firebombing or looting. Events went on for several more days.

== See also ==
- History of Omaha
- French people in Nebraska
