= 13th Street (Omaha) =

Street in Omaha, Nebraska, United States

- Interactive map of 13th Street
- Location: Omaha
- South end: 41.1855°N 95.9327°W
- North end: 41.279°N 95.933°W

Construction
- Inauguration: 1854

13th Street is a two-way street that runs south–north in Omaha, Nebraska. Historically significant areas along the street include Squatter's Row, Little Italy, Little Bohemia, and Mount Vernon Gardens.

== History ==
13th Street was the original arterial from Nebraska City into Omaha used by pioneers, who generally stocked up in the city and then went westbound towards the prairies and the Great Platte River Road. The street was later used to run electric streetcar service from Omaha to South Omaha.

== Neighborhoods ==
Along with Squatter's Row, Little Bohemia, and Little Italy, there are several other neighborhoods along the route of 13th Street, including the Old Market, Spring Lake, and Deer Park. Communities include East Omaha, Downtown Omaha, South Omaha, and Bellevue.

The street goes by the site of the former Douglas House and the original Woodmen of the World Building, and historic buildings such as the Omaha Bolt, Nut and Screw Building, the G.C. Moses Block, Bohemian Cafe, Prague Hotel, Sokol Auditorium, Gallagher Building, and Stabrie Grocery. The Gene Leahy Mall is also along the street. Father Flanagan's first boys home was located along South 13th Street at the Old German Civic Center. Rosenblatt Stadium, the old Rosewater School, and Mt. Vernon Gardens. The city's original Market House, built in the 1870s, was located on 13th Street and Capitol Avenue.

== Connections ==
Beginning at the Missouri River in East Omaha and moving south, North 13th Street intersects with Locust Street to enter Carter Lake, Iowa. Moving through downtown, the first major connection is with Interstate 480. It then crosses Dodge Street, the major east–west low-density arterial in Omaha. The next major connection is connecting with Interstate 80, both east and west-bound connections. After intersecting with Deer Park Boulevard, the street crosses U.S. Route 275. After momentarily becoming Fort Crook Road, the street continues south into Bellevue and terminates in rural Sarpy County.

== See also ==
- History of Omaha, Nebraska
