= Dahlman neighborhood =

Coordinates: 41°14′39″N 95°55′29″W

The Dahlman neighborhood is located south of downtown Omaha, Nebraska. One of the oldest neighborhoods in the city, it was originally platted in 1856. It was later named after "Cowboy" James Dahlman, an eight-term mayor of Omaha.

== History ==
Originally platted in 1854, the Dahlman neighborhood was full of ethnic enclaves. This fact was reflected in the Catholic Churches in the neighborhood: St. Wenceslaus served the area's Czechs (Bohemians), St Joseph's served Germans, St. Patrick's for the Irish, and St. Philomena for the Italian community.

== Landmarks ==
Dahlman has several landmarks. They include the Omaha Botanical Gardens at 6th and Cedar Streets, and the Bohemian Cafe at 13th and William Streets. The Prague Hotel and the Admiral Theatre (formerly the Sokol Auditorium) at 13th and Martha Streets are listed on the National Register of Historic Places.

The area is also home to Grace University at 9th and William Streets, St. Frances Cabrini Church at 10th and William Streets and Dietz United Methodist Church at 10th and Worthington Streets.

Dahlman Park, located at 615 Pine Street, has horseshoe pits, basketball and tennis courts and walking paths.

== See also ==
- History of Omaha

== Bibliography ==
- Bluvas, J. and Bluvas, M. (1998) Dahlman Neighborhood: Chronology of Businesses and Institutions 1880-1998. Available from the Dahlman Neighborhood Association.
