= Swedes in Omaha, Nebraska =

The Swedes in Omaha, Nebraska are a long-standing ethnic group in the city with important economic, social, and political ties.

== History ==
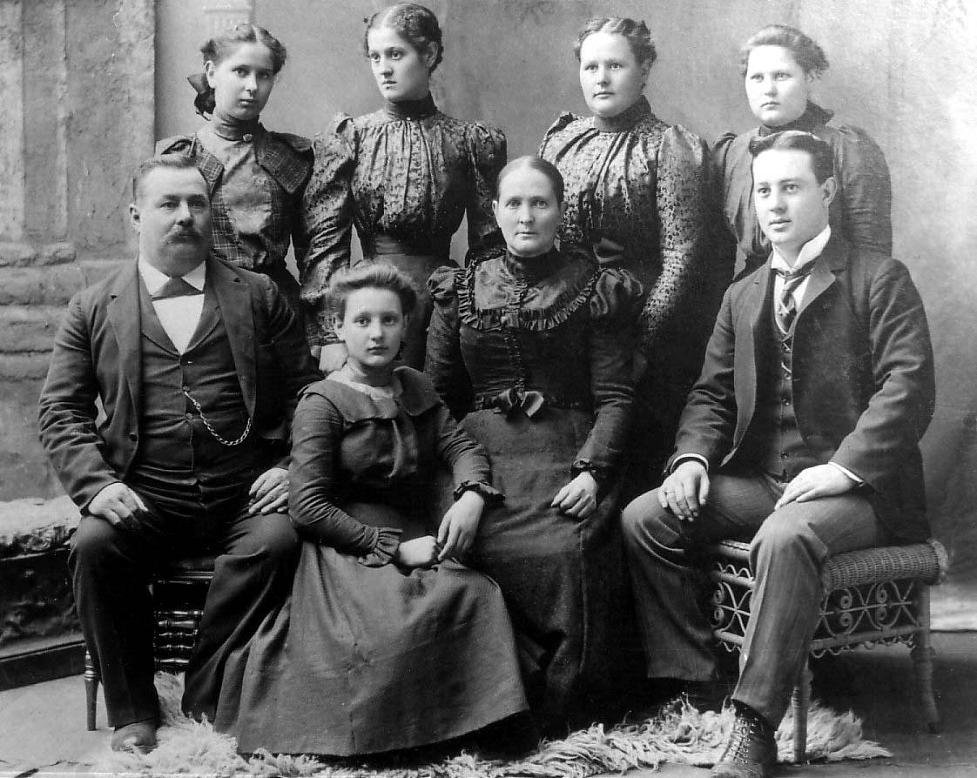
Anna Truedsdotter Hansen (1851-1922) was born in Hässleholm Municipality - with her German husband she brought six children up in Omaha in the 1890s, of whom Louis P. Hansen was a familiar cigar maker. A grandnephew on the Swedish side was Stanley M. Truhlsen.

The first Swedes in Omaha came through Florence at the Winter Quarters of the Mormons. The group continued to come through, particularly with the construction of the Union Pacific railroad in the 1860s and the Union Pacific Railroad Omaha Shops Facility near downtown Omaha. In 1871, a committee of Swedes came from Illinois to determine whether the Nebraska prairie was suitable for Swedish settlement and farming. When they did, this committee effectively ushered in an entirely new influence in the growth of the state. This led to a variety of towns being settled, including Stromsburg, Oakland, Pender, Wakefield, and Wausa. Other significant Swedish populations in Nebraska included Mead, Malmo, and Swedeburg. It also led to the development of Omaha's substantial Swedish population.

== Neighborhoods ==
Omaha boasted an area of the city with such a heavy concentration of Swedes that it was called "Little Stockholm". That early area was in the Near North Side neighborhood, bordered by 21st and 18th Streets, from Cass to Cumming Streets. Further north in the Kountze Place neighborhood was another area with "many Swedes, some of the 'better class'". Other professional people who were from Sweden lived in the Gifford Park neighborhood around 36th and Cass Streets. The impact of Swedes on the North Omaha community may be present in the Vikings mascot of Omaha North High School. Josie McCullough, who grew up in the Near North Side during the late 1800s, wrote, "In that neighborhood Swedish, Bohemian, Italian, Irish and Negro children all contributed to the process of Americanization." By 1930, Swedes made up more than 10 percent of Omaha's population.

== Institutions ==
There were a variety of Swedish institutions throughout Omaha, including religious, social, and economic facilities.

=== Churches ===
Second Baptist Church, originally built in 1889, was rebuilt in 1906 at South 26th and K Streets near South High. Swedish Salem Lutheran church on Vinton was the longest serving Omaha church with its original congregation, serving for more than 100 years from 1891 onwards. In 1922 the Trinity Lutheran Church at 30th Street and Redick Avenue in the Miller Park neighborhood of North Omaha was founded. These were both considered "children churches" of the original "mother churches", Immanuel Lutheran located at 17th and Cass, and the First Swedish Baptist Church. Other Swedish places of worship included First Swedish Methodist, Mission Covenant, Scandinavian Seventh Day Adventist, Holy Family Catholic, Trinity Episcopal, and Swedish Salvation Army. There was a notable corridor of Swedish churches along North 18th Street. The Immanuel congregation merged with its daughter, Zion, under the name Augustana Swedish Evangelical Lutheran in a building constructed at 36th and Lafayette Avenue near the Bemis Park neighborhood. The church is the subject of the 1966 Academy Award-winning documentary A Time for Burning.

=== Immanuel Hospital ===
On October 8, 1887, Reverend E.A. Fogelstrom and others organized the Evangelical Lutheran Immanuel Association for Works for Charity. In December 1890, the association completed construction of a hospital located at 36th and Meredith Streets in North Omaha. As the community's needs grew, a new hospital opened in 1910 in the same area, and a third hospital was built at the 36th and Meredith site in 1926. In the 1950s, a six-story addition to the hospital doubled its size. The current 166-acre site of the Immanuel Medical Center at 72nd and Sorensen Parkway opened on June 29, 1974.

=== Others ===
The Swedish Auditorium, a social hall, was located at 1611 Chicago Street near Downtown Omaha. The Auditorium housed a number of fraternities, including the Order of Vasa, the Vikings, Good Templars, and others. The Noon Day Scandinavian Club, a business group, has hosted Viking Fest, Christmas smörgåsbord, Pea Soup supper, and an annual banquet annually since 1909. The Omaha Posten (Omaha Post) was a Swedish-language paper published for several decades.

Today there is a Swedish consul in Omaha.

== Famous Swedes from Omaha ==
- Carl A. Swanson started a commission business hauling eggs, milk and poultry they bought from local farmers and selling them to the grocery stores and hotels in Omaha. His company fostered the famous Swanson foods brand.
- Glynn Ross was an American opera impresario from Omaha. The first general director of the Seattle Opera, he was also the second general director of the Arizona Opera, from 1983 to 1998.

== See also ==
- Ethnic groups in Omaha, Nebraska
- History of Omaha, Nebraska

== Bibliography ==
- Baumann, Louise Bloom; Gaines, Agneta Anderhagen; Mossblad, Gunnar; Skoog, Donald P.; Olsson, Nils William; Bohmansson, Carl Gustaf (2005). The Swedes in Omaha and South Omaha 1889. Swedish Cultural Committee. ISBN 0-9704655-1-3.
- Lund, L. Dale; Swanson, Reuben T.; Nelson, O. M. (1991). Swedish Omaha-Past and Present: Biographical sketches of Swedish-Americans in the Omaha area gathered in 1933, 1935, and 1991. Omaha: Swedish Cultural Committee.
- Skoog, Donald P. (ed) (2000). Swedes, Danes, and Norwegians: Oral Histories from Nebraska. Omaha: Swedish Cultural Committee. ISBN 0-9704655-0-5.
