= Czechs in Omaha, Nebraska =

Czechs in Omaha, Nebraska have made significant contributions to the political, social and cultural development of the city since the first immigrants arrived in 1868.

== About ==
In the 1860s, many Czechs primarily from Bohemia and Moravia immigrated to Nebraska. Edward Rosewater and John Rosicky, early Omaha newspaper editors originally from Bohemia, encouraged countrymen to come by extolling promises of free land in frontier Nebraska. By 1880 Czechs were the most concentrated ethnic group in the city.

Czech population in Omaha
Year	Number
1880	900
1890	2,675
1930	3,964

In 1893, the internationally known Czech composer Antonín Dvořák visited the city and performed there, attracting attendees from miles around. His extended visit to the United States inspired Dvořák to write his 9th Symphony: From The New World, also known as the New World Symphony. It was based on his impressions of the region and inspired by his fascination with birdsong, ragtime music by African-American musician and composer Scott Joplin, band music, and folksongs.

Komenský Clubs were founded in Nebraska, including in Omaha, Lincoln and other cities where there were numerous Czech immigrants. When the Bohemian National Alliance was formed in 1914, its midwestern district was headquartered in Omaha. Czechs in the city helped promote Bohemian independence after World War I. The nation of Czechoslovakia was created in the break-up of the Austro-Hungarian Empire. By 1920 an estimated 3,500 immigrants lived in Bohemian Town.

== Notable Czechs from Omaha ==
- Roman Hruska was elected to the US Senate from Nebraska in the mid-20th century.
- The Dusek Family were famous in the early days of professional wrestling.
- Edward Rosewater was a Jewish Czech immigrant who came to Omaha in 1863. In 1871 he established the Omaha Bee. The same year he founded the first Czech newspaper in Omaha, the Pokrok Západu, which means "Progress of the West".

== Legacy ==
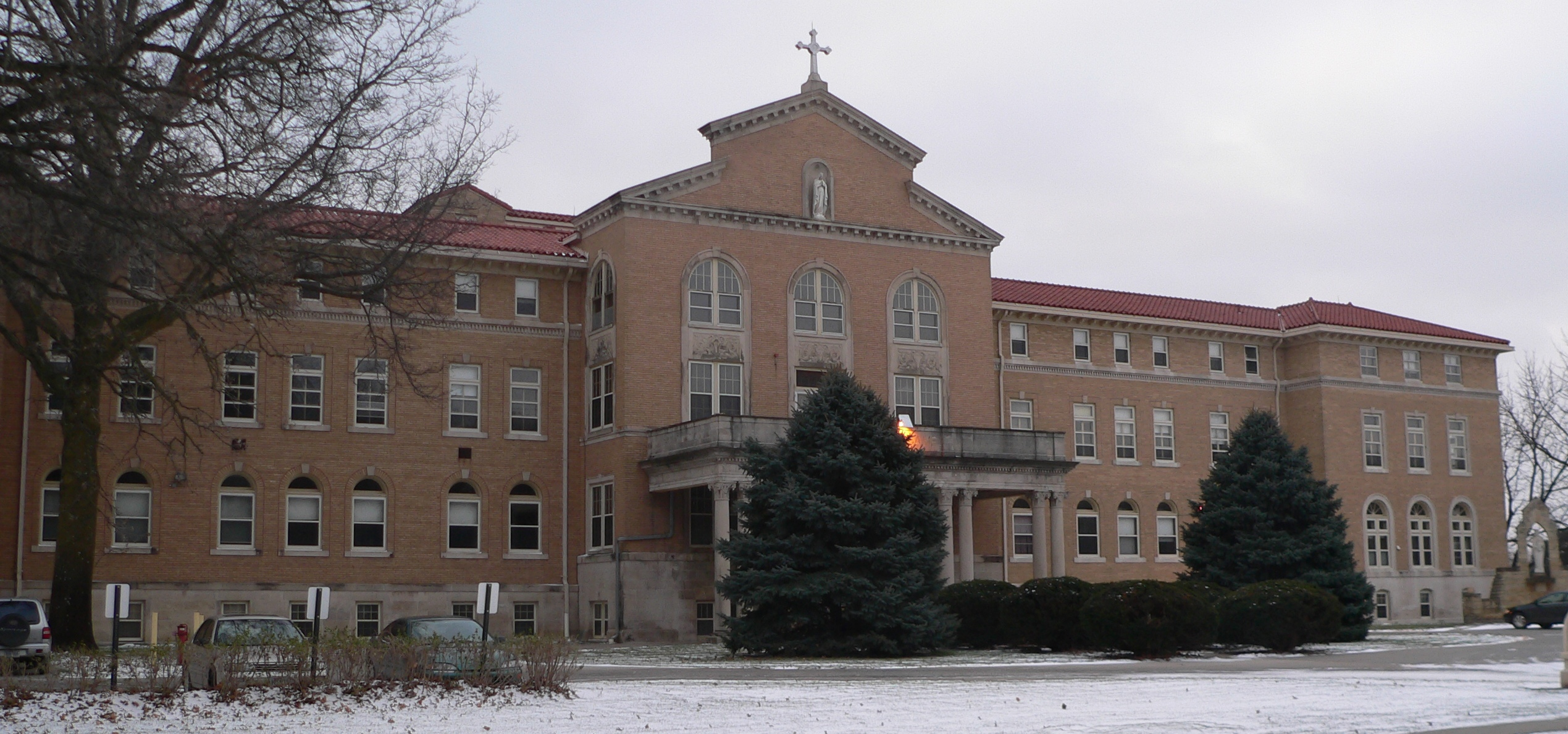
Notre Dame Academy and Convent, November 2010

Czechs from Omaha helped gain legislative approval to found the Czech Language Program at the University of Nebraska, instituted in 1907. Additionally, a Czech heritage course was created at the College of St. Mary in Omaha. These programs have served as centers for teaching Czech language, literature and culture for nearly a century.

Nuns of Czech descent raised funds to build and staff the Notre Dame Academy and Convent at 3501 State Street to provide outreach to the area's Czech community. Czech immigrants and descendants also founded the Sokol South Omaha Czechoslovak Museum at 2021 U Street in South Omaha, and the Bohemian National Cemetery at 5201 Center Street. Other cemeteries with mostly Czech burials or large Czech sections are Calvary Cemetery, Holy Sepulchar Cemetery, and Saint Mary Catholic Cemetery.

=== Little Bohemia ===
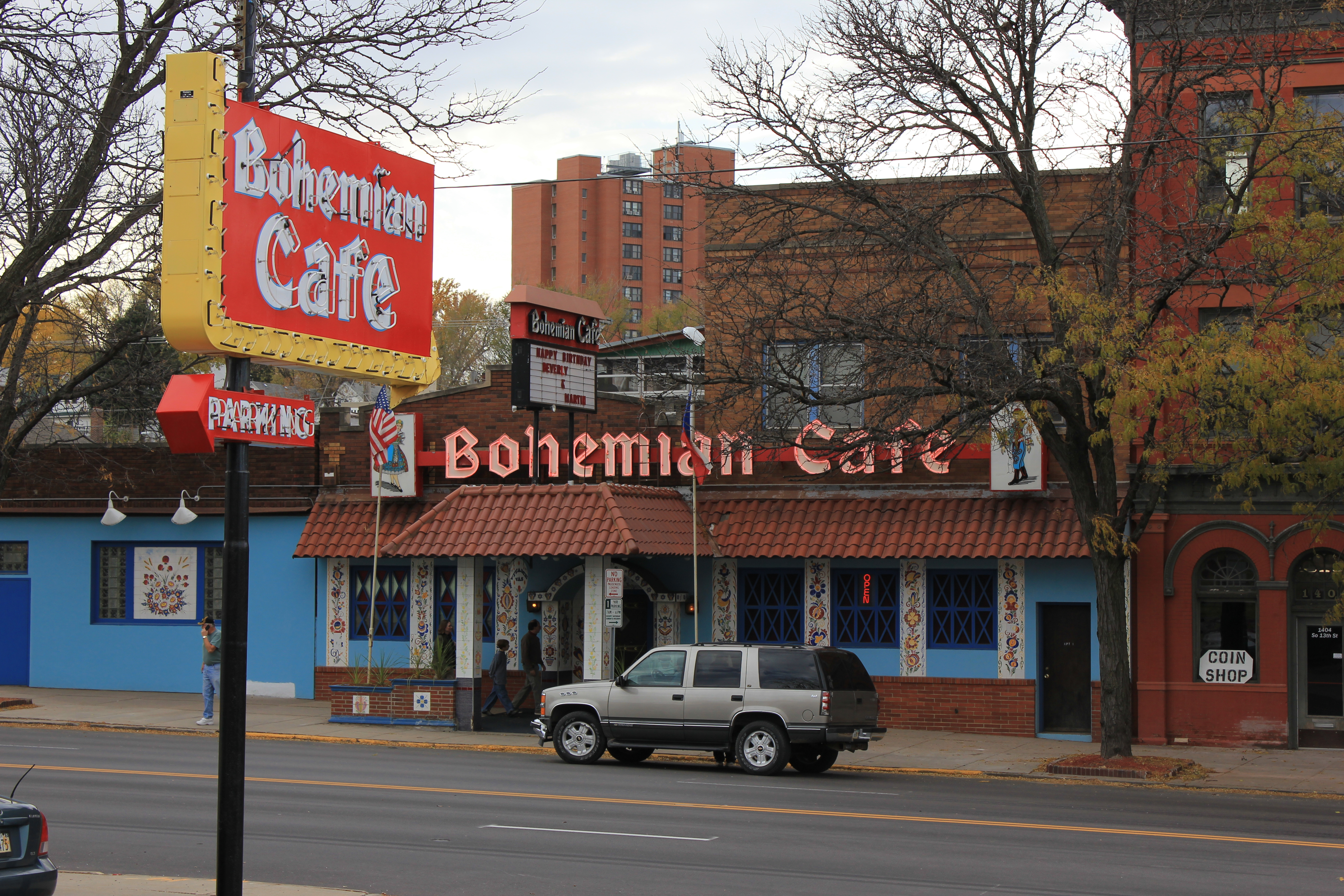
Bohemian Cafe, November 2011

The major Bohemian landmark in the city was the ethnic enclave established by Czechs that was centered on a commercial area along South 13th and South 14th Streets, and William Street. This enclave, called Little Bohemia, was bounded by South 10th Street on the east, South 16th Street on the west, Pierce Street on the north, and Martha Street on the south. It included the Prague Hotel, Sokol Auditorium and Bohemian Cafe, all important fixtures in the community.

Another important neighborhood was located around Brown Park.

== See also ==
- Czech Nebraskan
- History of Omaha
- Bohemian Alps

== Notes ==
- Population statistics for 1880 are from Omaha City Planning Department (nd) A Comprehensive Program for Historic Preservation in Omaha. p. 38; for 1890 they came from Larsen and Cottrell (1997) p 122, and; for 1930 they came from Larsen and Cotterell p 157.
