= Bee Building =

Historic Omaha office building

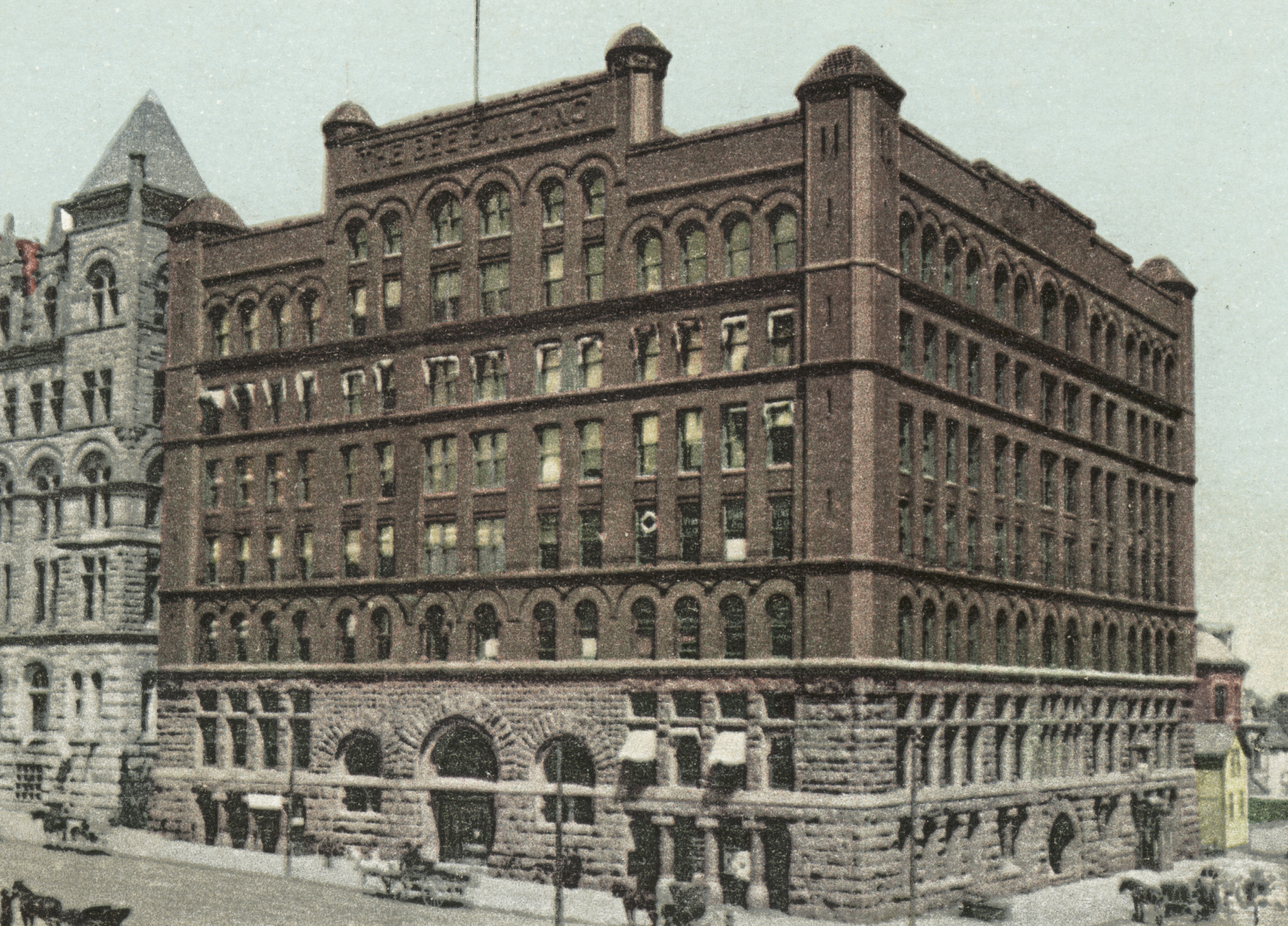
- Bee Building, c. 1903
- Interactive map of the Bee Building area

General information
- Location: Omaha, Nebraska, United States
- Coordinates: 41°15′28″N 95°56′21″W
- Construction started: 1887
- Completed: 1888
- Demolished: 1966
- Cost: $500,000
- Client: Omaha Bee

Design and construction
- Architect: Solon S. Beman

The Bee Building, later called the Peters Trust Building and finally the Insurance Building, was located at 17th and Farnam Streets in Downtown Omaha, Nebraska. It was an architectural landmark in early Omaha that was built in 1888 by newspaper editor Edward Rosewater to house his Omaha Bee newspaper as well as several other companies. A period review remarked that the building was "probably only second in the United States to that of the New York Herald."

== History ==
Located next to Omaha's second City Hall, the Bee Building was built on the site of the Rosewater family's former homestead. It was a seven-story red granite structure, with detailing such as carved beehives as exterior ornaments and carved miniature beehives on the doorknobs, playing off the name of the newspaper. Built for almost $500,000, it was touted by the Bee as the world's largest newspaper plant. Circulation in 1889 was 18,736. The noted Omaha National Bank Building was built the same year on the same block.

According to The New York Times, Edward Rosewater died at his office in the building on September 1, 1906. On March 5, 1909, the Mutual Benefit Health and Accident Association opened its doors in the Bee Building, which has been called Mutual of Omaha since 1944.

The joint financial concerns Peters Trust Company and Peters National Bank took over occupancy of the building in 1920 and it was renamed the Peters Trust Building. Business prospered for a time. Then on November 25, 1929, District Judge Redick ordered the trust company liquidated due to a combination of mortgage deflation and an embezzlement scheme for which two top officials pleaded guilty. Ownership of the building briefly reverted to Bee company until Woodmen of the World purchased it in 1932 and renamed it the Insurance Building. They spent more than one million dollars remodeling the building between 1932 and 1949. Architect Leo A Daly Sr. did much of the remodeling. In 1935, it was the first office building west of Chicago to be centrally air conditioned.

Woodmen of the World continued to make improvements to the building as late as 1964. Both the Bee Building and the Old City hall were torn down in 1966 to build the Woodmen Tower.

== See also ==
- History of Omaha
