= Pokrok Západu =

Czech language newspaper in Nebraska, United States

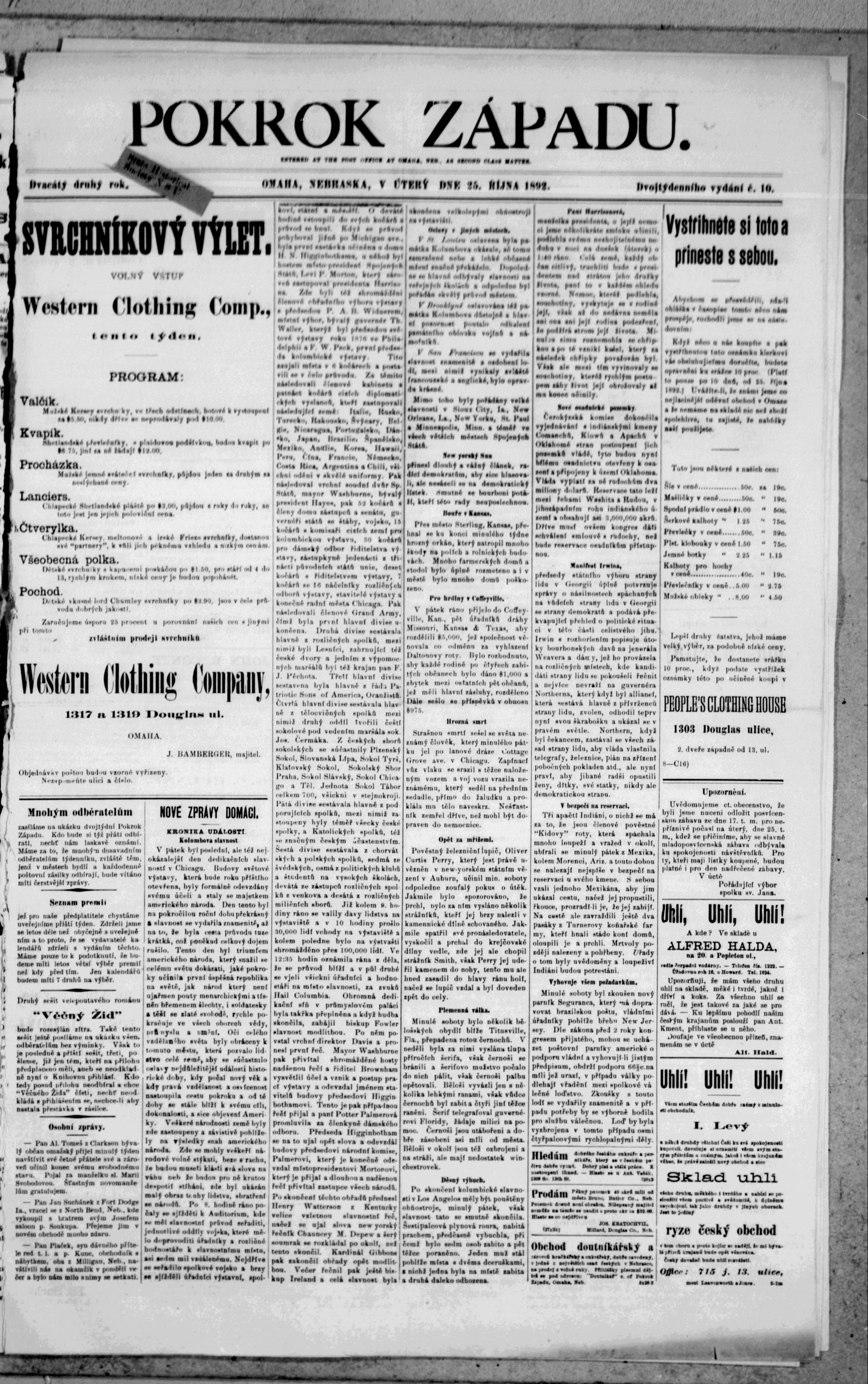
- The cover page of the October 25, 1892 issue of the Pokrok Západu
- Publisher: Edward Rosewater
- OCLC number: 990281385
- City: Omaha, Nebraska
- Country: United States of America
- OCLC number: 9427211

The Pokrok Západu (the Progress of the West in English) was a Czech language newspaper in Nebraska, running issues from 1871 to 1920. It was the first Czech newspaper in the state, and in 1900, began sponsoring other Czech language newspapers in other locations, such as in Minnesota. It was founded by Edward Rosewater, sold to Jan Rosický in 1877, and sold again in 1920, when it stopped further publication.

== Founding and dissolution ==
The Pokrok Západu (in English meaning Progress of the West) was founded in 1871 by Edward Rosewater, a Jewish immigrant, who after coming to Omaha had founded the Omaha Daily Bee. The first Czech language newspaper in Nebraska, it was at first designed for advertisements of land to prospective settlers in the state. It was supported by American railroad companies. In 1887, it was sold to Jan Rosický, an immigrant who had come to Omaha in the 1870s to edit the paper. Under Rosický, the newspaper became a place for Czechs to inform one another; he used it to influence Czech migrations across the American midwest. While most Czech Nebraskans in politics were Democratic, the paper was Republican in orientation. Editors of the paper included Vaclav Snajder, V. A. Jung, F. J. Kutak, Jaroslav Albert Havranek, and Otakar Charvat.

Rosický also published other papers, such as the Czech language Květy Americké (American Blossoms), a literary magazine containing original work by Czech Americans, and the Hospodář (the Farmer), which became the largest-circulating agricultural magazine in Czech in the world, and which aided in Czech settlement to the United States. From 1876 to 1890, the Pokrok Západu was the official paper of the Czech Farmers' Mutual Aid Society in Nebraska, a group that helped settlers in the state. From 1890 to its dissolution in 1893, the mutual aid society was represented by the Nová Doba in Schuyler. In 1900, the Pokrok Publishing Company was formed, which published local Czech language papers in other locations, such as Iowa (Iowský Pokrok), Minnesota (Minnesotský Pokrok), and Wilber, Nebraska (Wilberský Týdeník, the Wilber Weekly). From 1915 to 1920, the Pokrok Západu was a daily paper, before it was sold to the Hlasatel of Chicago; in 1920, it ceased publication. It was the longest-running Czech newspaper in the United States.

The motto of the paper was "Pilně služíc zájmu národnímu, hledět chci vždy k vzdělání obecnému": "While ever serving national interest let me give heed always to the education of all".
