= Swoboda Bakery =

- U.S. National Register of Historic Places
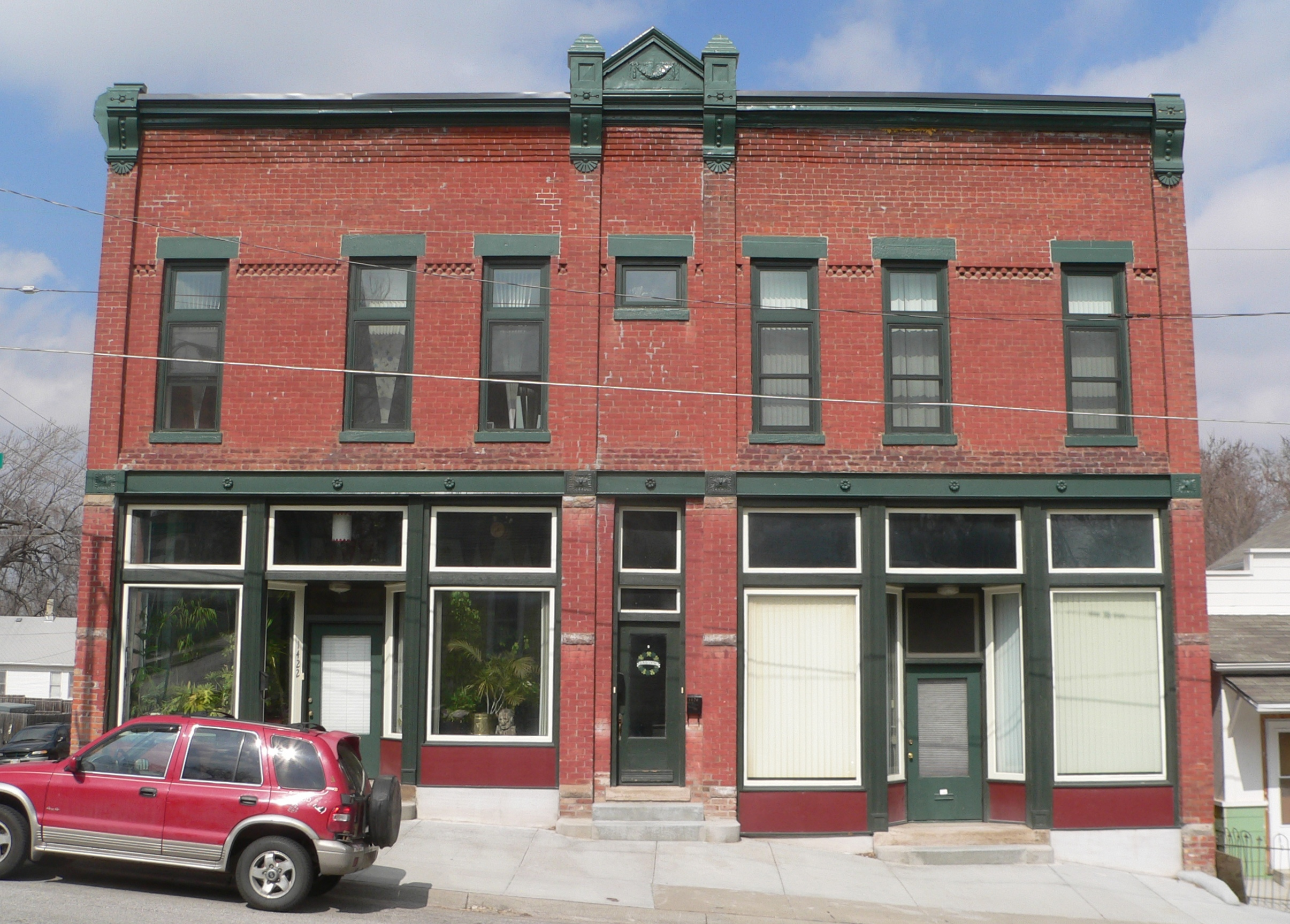
- Swoboda Bakery, seen across William Street

- Location within Nebraska Location within the United States
- Location: 1422 William Street, Omaha, Nebraska
- Coordinates: 41°14′44.74″N 95°56′8.84″W
- Built: 1889
- Architect: Joseph Dworak & Co.
- Architectural style: Late Victorian
- NRHP reference No.: 96000768
- Added to NRHP: July 19, 1996

The Swoboda Bakery was built in 1888 in the Little Bohemia neighborhood of Omaha, Nebraska. It was listed on the National Register of Historic Places on July 19, 1996.

== History ==
Constructed in 1888 by Joseph Dworak & Company, the Swoboda Bakery was central to Omaha's Czech immigrant community. The two-story building was originally designed as a mixed-use commercial and residential property. After a City-funded rehabilitation was completed in 1996, the building was converted to rental residential space only.

== See also ==
- History of Omaha
