= Rosewater School =

- U.S. National Register of Historic Places
- Omaha Landmark
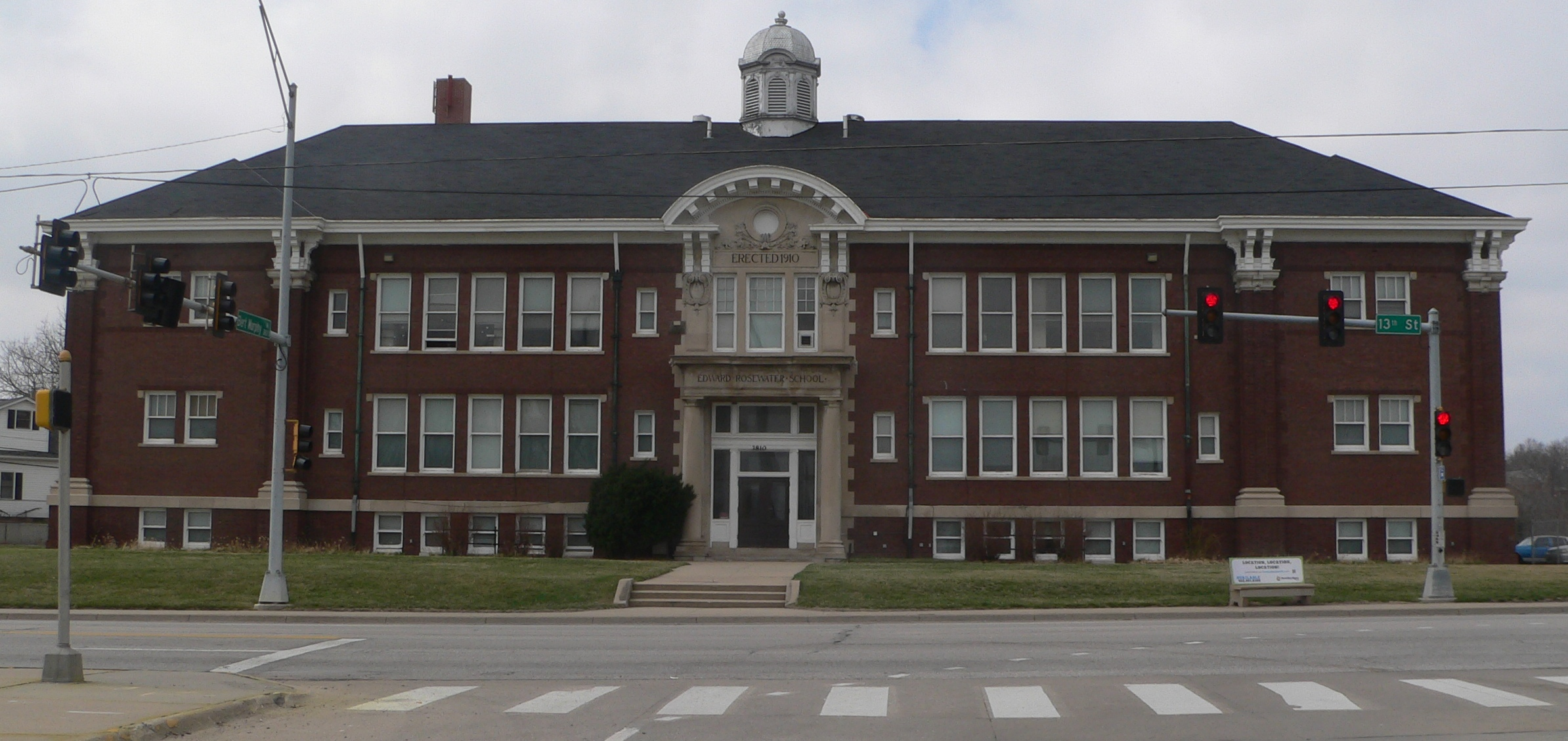
- Rosewater School, seen across 13th Street

- Location within Nebraska Location within the United States
- Location: 3764 South 13th Street, Omaha, Nebraska
- Coordinates: 41°13′25″N 95°56′02″W
- Built: 1910
- Architect: Frederick W. Clarke
- Architectural style: Late 19th and 20th century Revivals
- NRHP reference No.: 85001070

Significant dates
- Added to NRHP: May 16, 1985
- Designated OMAL: September 18, 1984

The Rosewater School, now known as the Rosewater Apartments, is located in South Omaha, Nebraska, United States. Built in 1910, the building was named an Omaha Landmark on September 18, 1984, and added to the National Register of Historic Places in 1985.

== About ==
Named for Edward Rosewater, the founder of the Omaha Bee newspaper and organizer of the Omaha School District, the Rosewater School is called "a fine example of the Second Renaissance Revival style of architecture." The brick, two-story structure was converted to apartments in 1985.
