= Czech Nebraskan =

Nebraskan residents with Czech ancestry

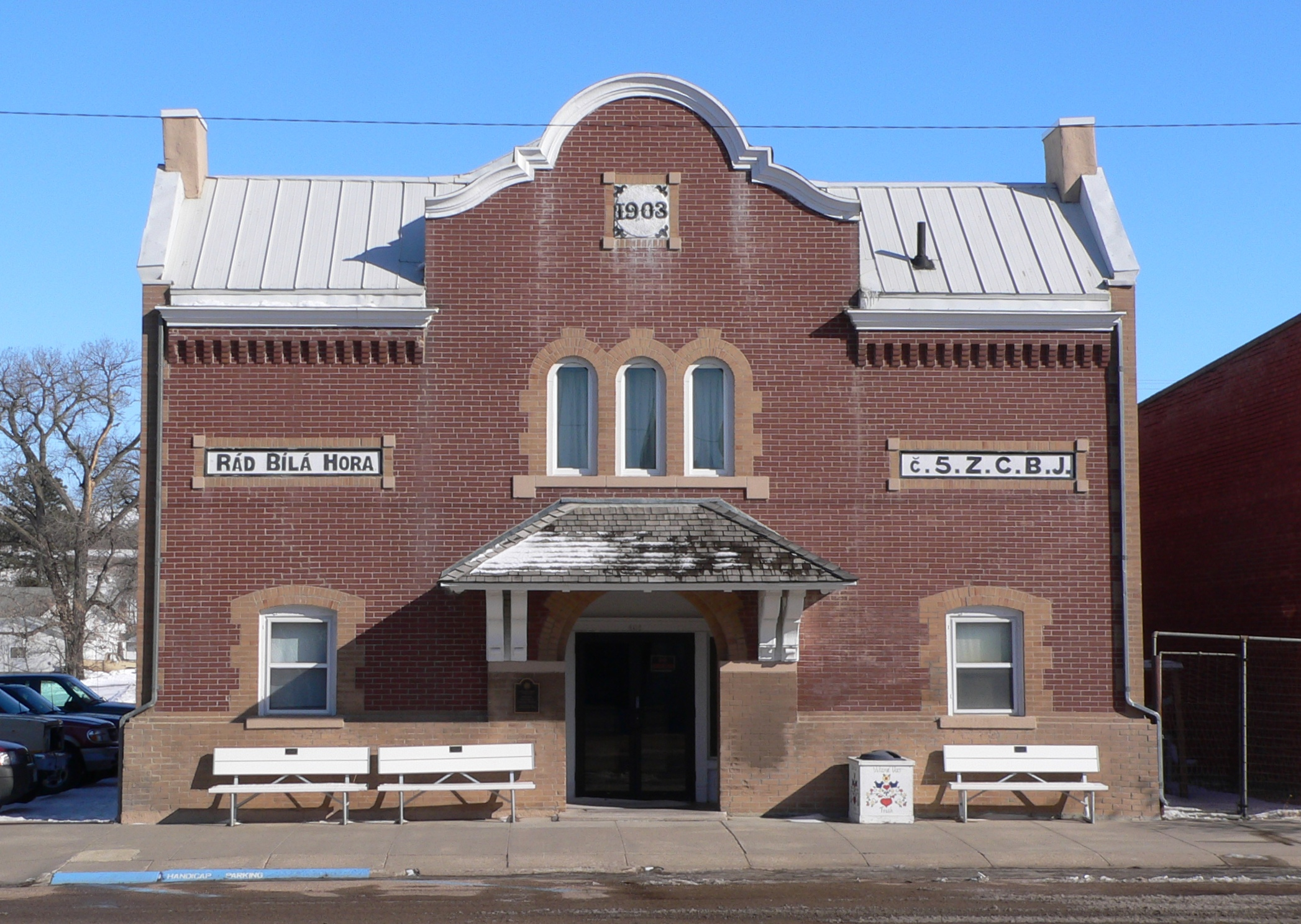
Z.C.B.J. Opera House, an opera house in Verdigre that served as a meeting hall for Bohemian immigrants.

Czech Nebraskans are residents of the state of Nebraska who are of Czech ancestry. As of the 2000 U.S. Census, Czech-Americans living in Nebraska make up 5.5% of the state's population, the largest percentage of any state. 3,295 Nebraskans can speak the Czech language.

Hrbková had estimated that of the 539,392 Bohemians counted in the 1910 Census, about one eighth lived in Nebraska.

Various fraternal orders, and thirteen Komensky educational clubs were established in Nebraska. The Sokol society had organizations in Crete and in Wilber.

A Czech language newspaper, the Pokrok Západu (Progress of the West), was founded in Omaha in 1871. Other Czech language newspapers in Nebraska included Přítel Lidu (People's Friend), Ozvěna Západu (Echo of the West), and Wilberské Listy.

A state organization for Czech Nebraskans, Nebraska Czechs Inc., was formed in 1963.

== See also ==
- Czechs in Omaha, Nebraska
