= French people in Nebraska =

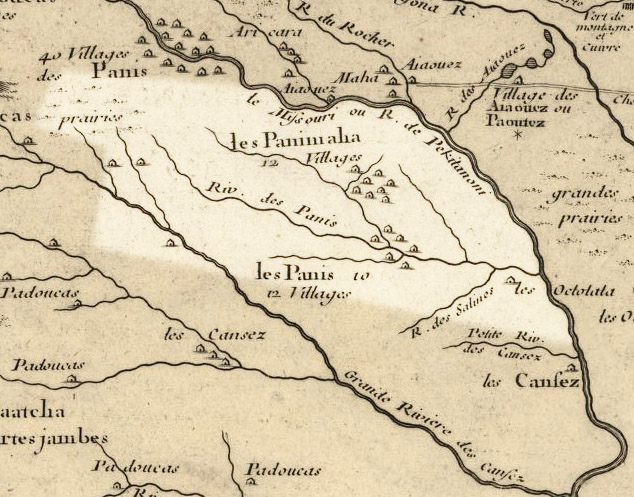
Nebraska as depicted in Guillaume de L'Isle's 1718 map, with the approximate area of the future state highlighted

French people have been present in the U.S. state of Nebraska since before it achieved statehood in 1867. The area was originally claimed by France in 1682 as part of La Louisiane, the extent of which was largely defined by the watershed of the Mississippi River and its tributaries. Over the following centuries, explorers of French ethnicity, many of them French-Canadian, trapped, hunted, and established settlements and trading posts across much of the northern Great Plains, including the territory that would eventually become Nebraska, even in the period after France formally ceded its North American claims to Spain. During the 19th century, fur trading gave way to settlements and farming across the state, and French colonists and French-American migrants continued to operate businesses and build towns in Nebraska. Many of their descendants continue to live in the state.

== Political history ==
According to historian Addison Erwin Sheldon, the French knew of the Otoe and Missouri tribes in Nebraska as early as 1673. In 1682, French explorer René-Robert Cavelier, Sieur de La Salle claimed the area first when he named all the territory drained by the Mississippi River and its tributaries for France, naming it La Louisiane (Louisiana). In 1714, fellow French explorer Étienne de Veniard, Sieur de Bourgmont traveled from the mouth of the Missouri River in Missouri to the mouth of the Platte River, which he called the Rivière Nebraskier, becoming the first person to approximate the state's name. Brothers and French-Canadian voyageurs Pierre Antoine and Paul Mallet sought to reach Santa Fe, New Mexico by water via what they renamed the Platte River in 1739. They ended up following the south fork of the Platte into what is now Colorado.

French colonists settled throughout the Mississippi Valley, first to the east of the river in areas such as present-day Illinois. Trappers and traders established relationships with Native American tribes at major points around the Great Lakes and along the Mississippi and Missouri rivers.

In the Treaty of Fontainebleau in 1762, France ceded its lands west of the Mississippi River to Spain. In 1794 a French trapper named Jean-Baptiste Truteau established a trading post 30 miles up the Niobrara River. The next year, in 1795, Jacques D'Eglise traveled the Missouri River Valley on behalf of the Spanish crown. Searching for the elusive Northwest Passage, D'Eglise did not go any further than central North Dakota.

In 1803 the United States purchased the Louisiana Territory from France for $15,000,000. What became Nebraska was under the "rule" of the United States for the first time.

== Business presence ==
The first Europeans to see the Platte River were French explorers and fur trappers in about 1714; they first called it the Nebraskier (Nebraska), a transliteration of the name given by the Otoe people, meaning "flat water".

Jean Pierre Cabanné operated a fur trading post north of Omaha along the Missouri. Other French-Canadian posts in Nebraska include the Bordeaux Trading Post, the Post of the Otos, and the Robidoux Pass Trading Post. The Spaniard Manuel Lisa, a partner of the French-dominated Missouri Trading Company, established Fort Lisa north of Omaha in the Ponca Hills in the early 1800s. Due to his positive relationships with many tribes, Lisa thwarted British influence with their allied tribes in the area during the War of 1812.

In 1820 the U.S. Army established Fort Atkinson near the present-day town of Fort Calhoun in order to protect the area's burgeoning fur trade industry. In 1822 the Missouri Fur Company built a headquarters and trading post about nine miles north of the mouth of the Platte River on the site of Fontenelle's Post. Calling it Bellevue, these French-Americans established the first town in Nebraska. In 1824 Jean-Pierre Cabanné established Cabanne's Trading Post for John Jacob Astor's American Fur Company near Fort Lisa, at the confluence of Ponca Creek and the Missouri River. It became a well-known post in the region.

== Placenames ==
Starting in the 1740s, there were French settlements in Eastern Nebraska along the Missouri River and elsewhere in the present-day state. According to History Nebraska, "[f]or a time their trading centers were Glenrock, Brock, Peru, and Brownville," as well as Julian. The same organization says, "Genuine French settlers came in the late 1850s, and for ten or fifteen years thereafter."

Historical accounts portrayed homes across Nebraska were "the French language was used in the settlers’ homes, while English was spoken elsewhere," as well as an event in 1918, where "the French people of Nemaha County held a picnic and celebration."

The town of Barada was named after Antoine Barada, whose father was the French fur trapper and interpreter Michel Barada. Early French Canadian trappers named the area south of Omaha Belle Vue because of the beauty of the view from the bluffs overlooking the Missouri River. Later, a fur trading post on that spot grew into the city of Bellevue. The town of Du Bois was named for the forest surrounding the area. Fremont was named for John C. Frémont, French-American pioneer and politician. Both Loup County and the Loup River were named after the Skidi Pawnee people, who called themselves the Wolf People. The town of Papillion was named from the French word papillon, which means "butterfly". The Platte County and Platte River were named for the French word for "flat," a translation of the Oto. Sarpy County was named after Peter Abadie Sarpy, a fur trader of French Creole origin, born in New Orleans, Louisiana. Early French maps noted an area called, "L'eau qui Pleure", the water that weeps, which today is the town of Weeping Water.

The town of Fontenelle was named after Logan Fontenelle, the son of the French Creole Lucien Fontenelle from New Orleans and Me-um-bane, his Omaha wife and a daughter of Big Elk, the principal chief. As an interpreter to the Omaha and United States, the younger Fontenelle was important during negotiations of the Treaty of 1854, by which the Omaha ceded most of their land to the United States. Several other places in Nebraska have been named after Logan Fontenelle, as well.

In 1840, Joseph Deroin set up a trading post along the Missouri River at the mouth of the Platte, at the main village of the Otoe. Deroin was the son of a Métis French Canadian trapper Amable De Rouins and his Otoe wife. The elder De Rouins had traded along the nearby Missouri River for decades, and a trading post was already operating near the townsite when Lewis and Clark came through with their expedition in 1804. The town of St. Deroin grew up around the trading post and was named in 1853 after Joseph Deroin was killed in an argument. Today it is a ghost town.

In 1885, the town of Chadron was platted and named in honor of Pierre Chadron, a French-Indian trapper who lived and trapped in the area. He was at one time a trader for the American Fur Company. The town of Bordeaux was named for Pierre Bordeaux, a French trapper and trader who came from Bordeaux, France, and took his name from that city.

Rosalie was named for Rosalie La Flesche, a daughter of Joseph La Flesche. A Métis, he was adopted by the Omaha chief Big Elk as his son and named his successor as principal chief of the Omaha tribe. Rosalie La Flesche married Edward Farley of Bancroft. She was a sister of Susette "Bright Eyes" LaFlesche, who became an Omaha activist and married to the noted journalist Thomas Tibbles; and of Susan LaFlesche Picotte, the first Native American female doctor in the United States.

== See also ==
- History of Nebraska
- Ethnic groups in Omaha, Nebraska
