= Little Bohemia (Omaha, Nebraska) =

Neighborhood in Nebraska, United States

Coordinates: 41°14′N 95°56′W

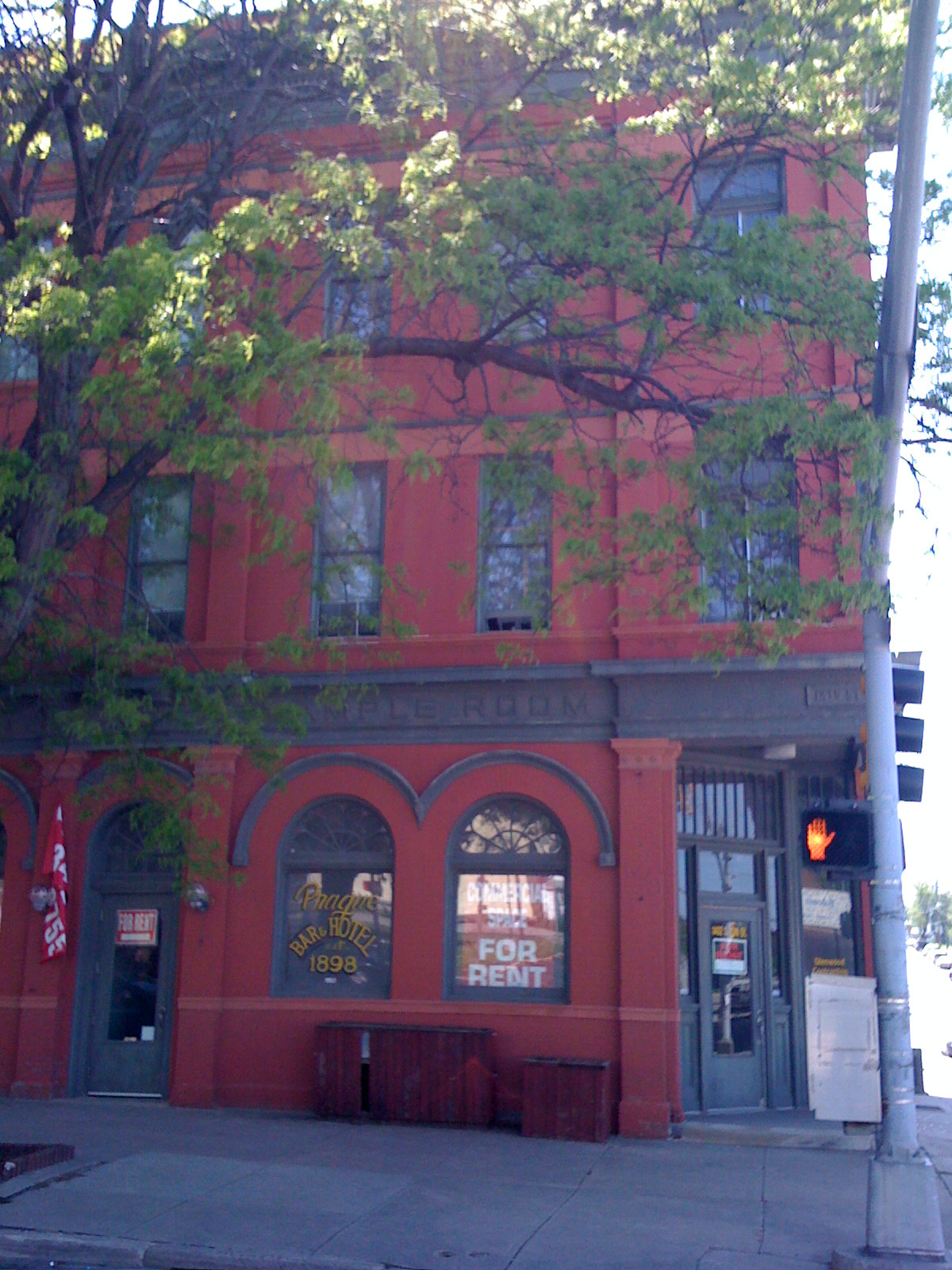
The Prague Hotel on South 13th Street in the heart of the Little Bohemia

Little Bohemia, or Bohemian Town, is a historic neighborhood in Omaha, Nebraska. Starting in the 1880s, Czech immigrants settled in this highly concentrated area, also called "Praha" (Prague) or "Bohemian Town", bounded by South 10th Street on the east, South 16th Street on the west, Pierce Street on the north, and Martha Street on the south, with a commercial area went along South 13th and South 14th Streets, centered on William Street. It was located south of downtown, and directly west of Little Italy. A portion of the neighborhood along South 13th Street was listed on the National Register of Historic Places in 2020.

== History ==
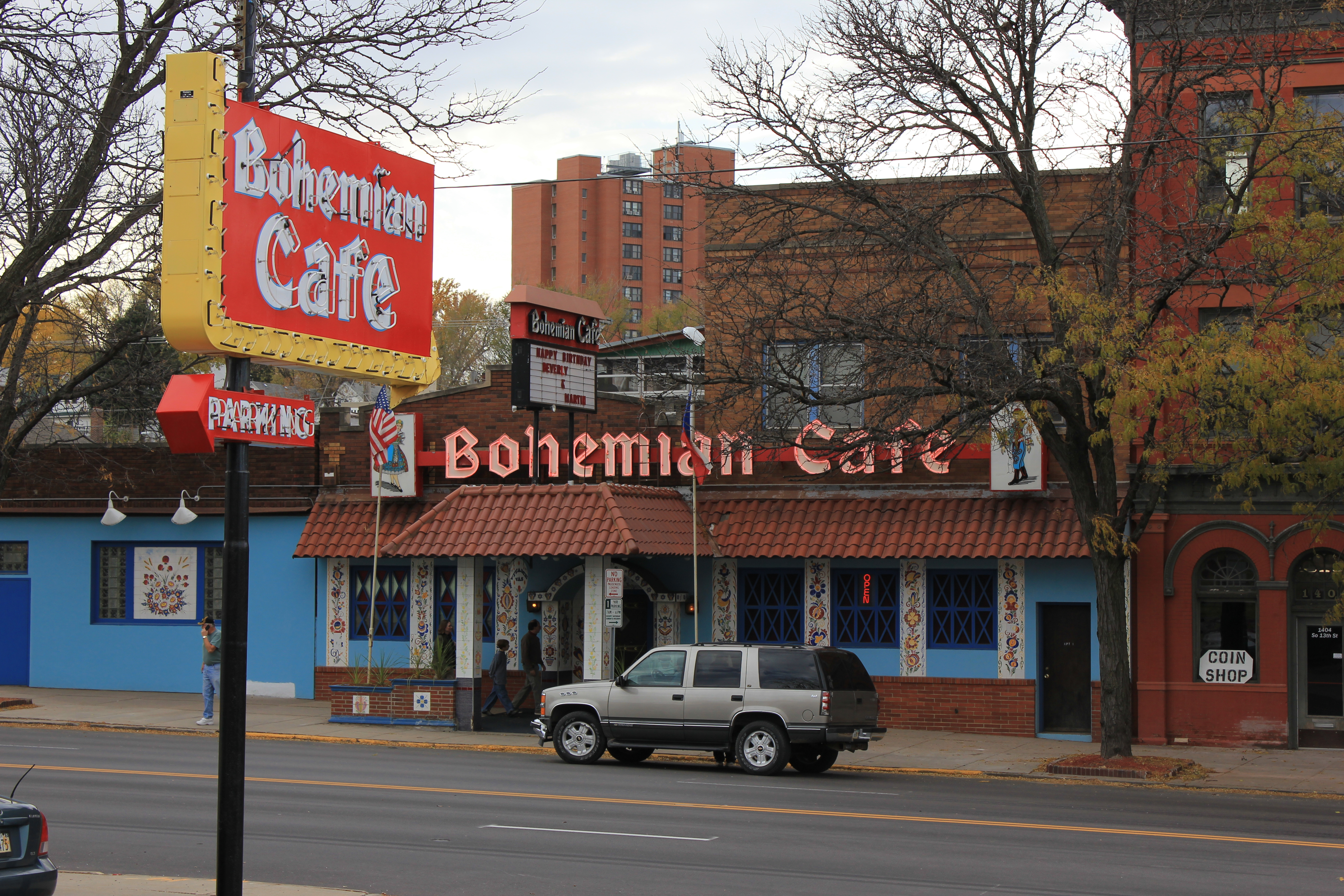
The Bohemian Cafe, South 13th Street

Early Czech immigrants from Austria-Hungary found work in Omaha's meatpacking industry, at the American Smelting and Refining Company lead smelter north of downtown, or at the Union Pacific shops. Institutions in the community included the Prague Hotel, built by Gottlieb Storz in 1898; Sokol Auditorium, built in 1926 by one of Omaha's four Czech Sokol movements, and St. Wenceslaus Church, a Czech Catholic Church. By 1919 the community also had a general store, grocery, dry goods store, a bakery, a shoemaker, saloon, milliner, and doctor.

As South Omaha's meatpacking industry grew, many Czechs moved from Bohemia Town to South Omaha, closer to their employment. Later concentrations of Czechs developed on the east side of South Omaha. The Immigration Act of 1924 was largely responsible for ending large-scale immigration of Czechs to Omaha.

== Landmarks ==
The Little Bohemia neighborhood has had several important landmarks.

- Prague Hotel on the SW corner of South 13th and William Streets.
- Bohemian Presbyterian Church at 1474 Hickory Street. There is a stained glass chalice above door, which is a symbol of the Hussite movement. Czech language services ended in 1980, and today it is home to Templo Victoria and Spanish language services.
- Bohemian Cafe on the SW corner of South 13th and William Streets.
- Famous Disney animator Art Babbitt lived at 1436 S. 13th as a child.
- Tourek Engraving and Printing on South 13th Street.
- Milacek and Sons Monument Company across from the Bohemian Cemetery Omaha on Center Street.
- Bohemian Cemetery Omaha (sometimes referred to as Bohemian National Cemetery) on Center Street.
- Donut Stop on South 13th Street.
- Tomasek Machine Shop, Inc. on South 13th Street.
- Sokol Auditorium and Gymnastics Hall on the northwest corner of South 13th and Martha Streets.
- Huser Printing, a Czech family printing business on South 13th Street.
- Former Bohemian-American National Committee headquarters at 1211 South 13th Street.
- St. Wenceslaus Church
- C.F Hermanek Company Annex, a Czechoslovak grocery store located at 1312 Williams Street

== See also ==
- Czechs in Omaha, Nebraska
- Czechoslovak Museum
- History of Omaha
