= Irish in Omaha, Nebraska =

Irish people

The Irish in Omaha, Nebraska have constituted a major ethnic group throughout the history of the city, and continue to serve as important religious and political leaders. They compose a large percentage of the local population.

In 2000 62,349 of the city's 390,112 residents claimed Irish roots on the U.S. Census. The Irish were the third largest ethnic group in South Omaha in 1900, with 1,073 out of 26,001 residents claiming Irish ancestry. By 1909 that area of the city claimed 2,250 out of their 30,000 residents were of Irish descent.

== 19th century ==
"The first church of any denomination in Nebraska was a Catholic church built in Omaha by Irish immigrants in 1856." Around this time a community of Irish settlers inhabited an area known as Gophertown, located north of the town of Saratoga and south of the town of Florence. The area was named for the dugout homes the immigrants had made in the wide-open plains of present-day North Omaha.

The Irish have comprised a major component of Omaha's immigrant community since the 1860s. Coming to the city in large numbers to build the Union Pacific Railroad starting in 1864, many Irish immigrants stayed to work in the railroads and took jobs as laborers in the wholesaling district. As many as 10,000 Irish laborers worked out of Omaha along the Union Pacific lines as they sprawled across the Western United States. Few had come directly from Ireland, instead arriving in Omaha via New York City, Boston, and other cities in the Eastern United States. During the twelfth and final meeting of the Nebraska Territory Legislature a group of 31 Irish leaders in the community promoted George Francis Train becoming a Senator for the new state because he had, "advocated so long the cause of Irish nationality." In 1863 Edward and Mary Creighton donated land to the local Catholic bishop, the Right Rev. James O'Gorman, to build a convent on the banks of the Missouri River. The Sisters of Mercy opened an academy and schools soon afterwards. The Creightons also donated land for a cathedral which was dedicated to St. Philomena. O'Gorman, also Irish, died and was buried in Omaha at the Calvary Catholic Cemetery in 1874.

In the 1870s and 1880s a major neighborhood for the local Irish community was the Near North Side. Josie McCullough, who grew up there during that period, wrote about the neighborhood saying, "In that neighborhood Swedish, Bohemian, Italian, Irish and Negro children all contributed to the process of Americanization." They also lived in an "uninviting floodplain" south of downtown which was later known as Little Italy.

James E. Boyd was an Irish-born politician in Omaha who served two terms as mayor in the 1880s, and was Nebraska Governor in the 1890s. In 1885 James O'Connor became the first Roman Catholic Archbishop of the Diocese of Omaha. Born in Queenstown, Ireland, he died in Omaha in 1890. When the Omaha Stockyards were established in 1887, the first employees were foreign-born Irish who moved directly to South Omaha. That year at the Nebraska Republican Party's annual convention in Lincoln, the delegates created a statement showing "the usual approval of the struggle for Irish home rule". The Nebraska Democratic Party presented a similar statement in its platform, too. Emmet Street in the Kountze Place neighborhood was probably named for Robert Emmet during this period.

In the 1890s the American Protective Association singled out Omaha's Irish population and targeted them in a campaign to drive immigrants out of the Midwestern United States and the Irish out of public office. By then Irish Americans lived throughout the city, and had assimilated to a large extent. They held an annual St. Patrick's Day celebration, and they moved into all levels of Omaha society, including politics and city government. Their acceptance in society benefited the Roman Catholic Church greatly.

== 20th century ==
Starting in the late 19th century, Omaha's Irish crime lord and political boss Tom Dennison gathered power in the early 1900s. His powerful political machine controlled all gambling, liquor and prostitution schemes in Omaha for almost 50 years, including having "Cowboy Jim" Dahlman elected mayor twelve times.

In 1906 Irish language scholar Douglas Hyde visited Omaha, raising a great deal of money for Gaelic League. While there he found the Rev. Dr. Richard Scannell, the bishop of the Roman Catholic Archdiocese of Omaha was a native of County Cork and spoke perfect Irish, as did many more residents of the city. After learning that more than one-sixth of the city's residents claimed Irish heritage, Hyde urged them to take steps to preserve their language and history.

In 1909 an Irish policeman named Edward Lowery was murdered trying to arrest a Greek immigrant in South Omaha who was accused of having sex with a young "white" woman. A mob was gathered by Joseph Murphy, an Irish leader in the community, and the ensuing Greek Town Riot destroyed South Omaha's Greek community, and the neighborhood was never rebuilt. In 1913 Harry Haywood's father was beaten by a gang of Irish youth in South Omaha, leading the family to move to Minneapolis where Haywood later rose to leadership in the Communist Party USA.

En route to an assignment in rural Nebraska in 1912, Irish-born Father Edward J. Flanagan became concerned about the welfare of orphans in the Omaha. In 1917 he founded the world-famous Boys Town. He has since become a symbol of great pride for the Irish community in Omaha.

In the 1920s the Irish Self-Determination Club of Omaha supported Ireland during the Irish War of Independence. The Club made a loan to the Elected Government of the Republic of Ireland in 1919, and made requests to the United States federal government to provide financial support to Ireland.

Tom Dennison's reign as Omaha's political boss ended in the early 1930s when he was brought to trial for conspiracy. In 1932 he suffered several debilitating strokes. He died in 1934.

== Present ==
Today there is a strong ethnic Irish presence in Omaha. Several social organizations, including the Ancient Order of Hibernians, the Omaha Area Emerald Society, and the Irish American Cultural Institute have chapters in the city. There are also several organizations promoting Irish culture, including as Brighid St. Brighid Theatre, and the fabulous Craoi na Tire Studio of Irish Dance. The Irish culture also includes the annual St. Patrick's Day parade.

== See also ==
- History of Omaha
