= Bukovany (Příbram District) =

- Municipality
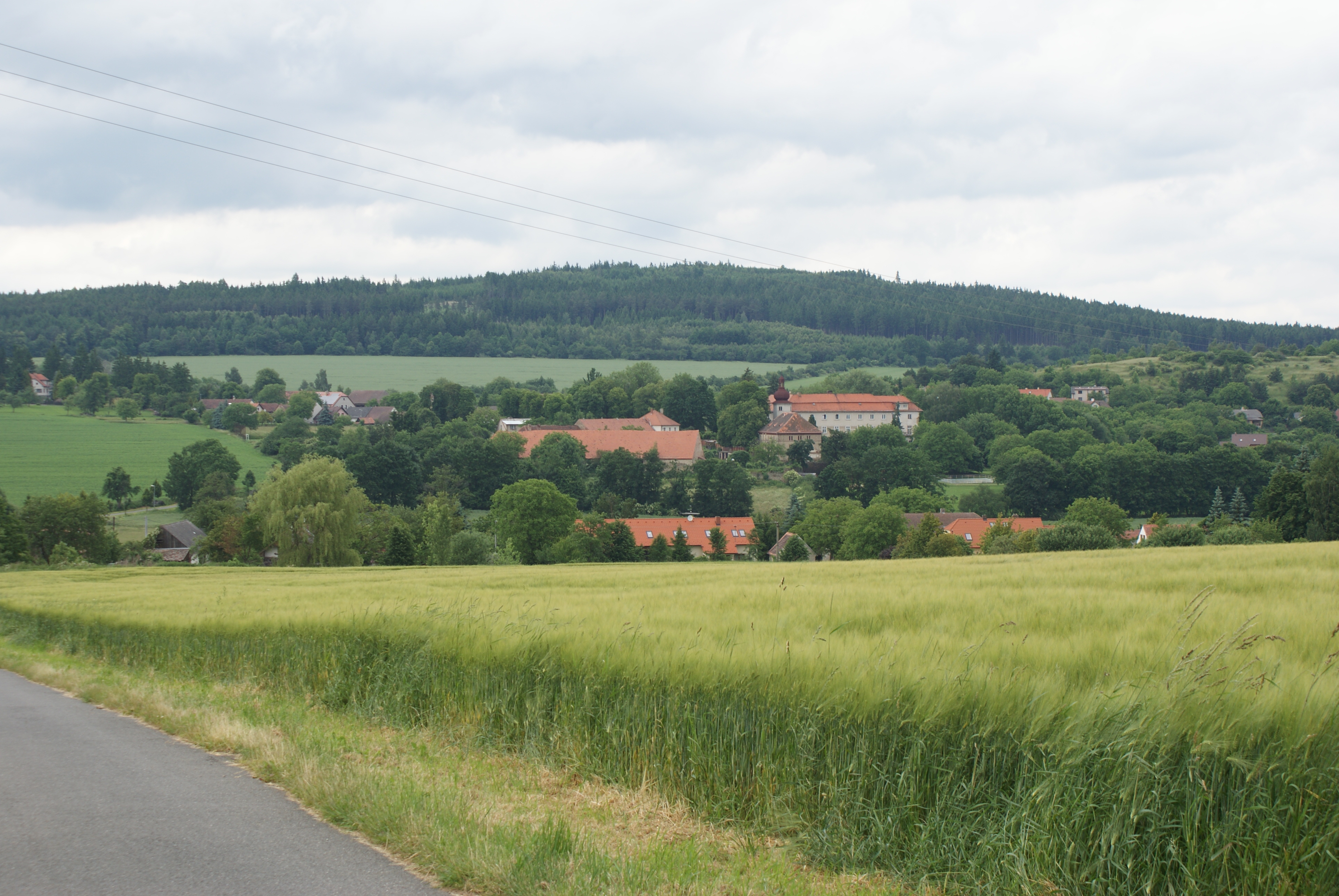
- View from the south

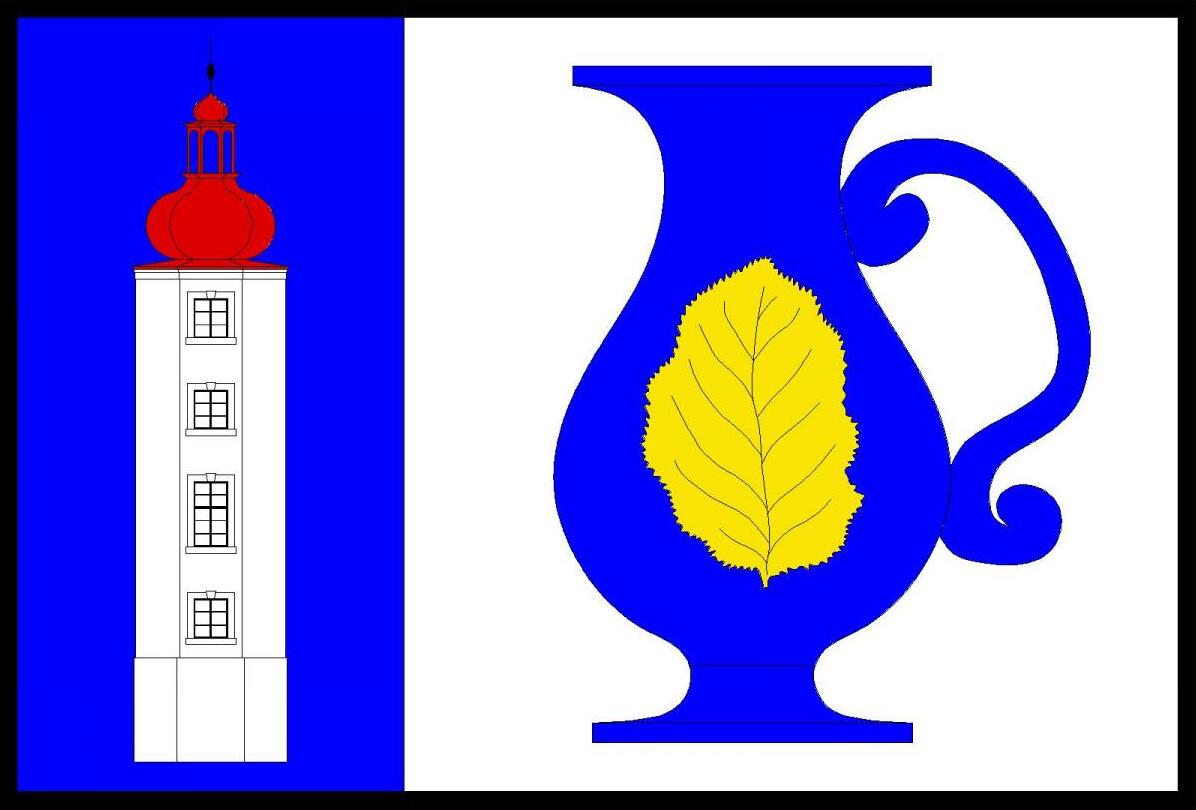
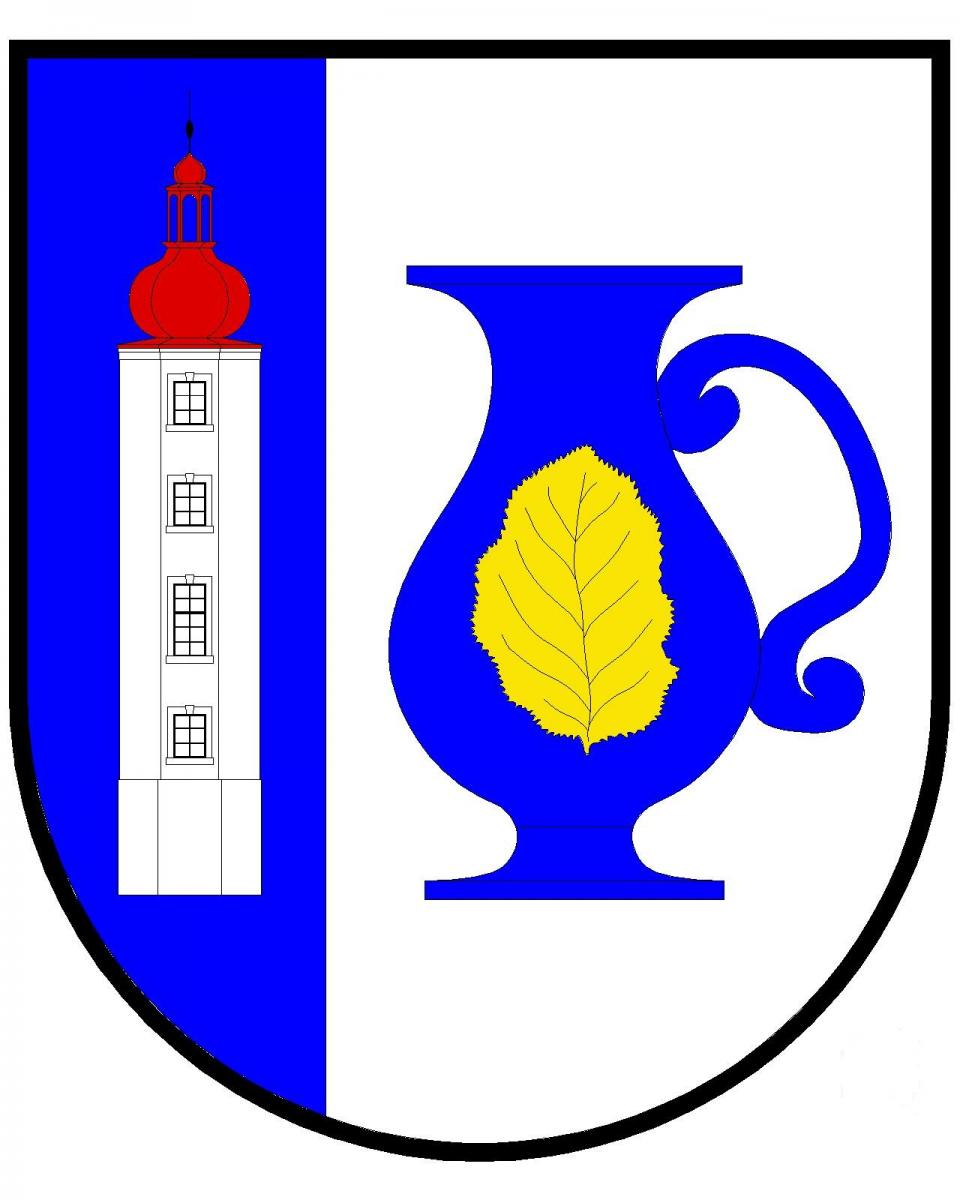
- Flag Coat of arms

- Location in the Czech Republic
- Coordinates: 49°34′29″N 14°6′9″E
- Country: Czech Republic
- Region: Central Bohemian
- District: Příbram
- First mentioned: 1318

Area
  - Total: 3.16 km^{2} (1.22 sq mi)
- Elevation: 520 m (1,710 ft)

Population (2026-01-01)
  - Total: 100
  - Density: 32/km^{2} (82/sq mi)
- Time zone: UTC+1 (CET)
  - Summer (DST): UTC+2 (CEST)
- Postal code: 262 72
- Website: www.bukovanypb.cz

Bukovany is a municipality and village in Příbram District in the Central Bohemian Region of the Czech Republic. It has about 100 inhabitants.

== Administrative division ==
Bukovany consists of two municipal parts (in brackets population according to the 2021 census):

- Bukovany (52)
- Sedlečko (28)

== Demographics ==
Historical population
Year	Pop.	±%
1869	369	—
1880	362	−1.9%
1890	321	−11.3%
1900	292	−9.0%
1910	252	−13.7%
1921	264	+4.8%
1930	252	−4.5%
1950	347	+37.7%
1961	176	−49.3%
1970	134	−23.9%
1980	111	−17.2%
1991	81	−27.0%
2001	71	−12.3%
2011	90	+26.8%
2021	80	−11.1%
Source: Censuses
