= Bohemian National Alliance =

The Bohemian National Alliance (later Czech National Alliance, Czech: České Národní Sdružení) was an American political party founded in Chicago, Illinois, on September 6, 1914. The party represented Czech American voters who supported the creation of Czechoslovakia as a state independent of Austria-Hungary. The party was disestablished in 1918 after Czechoslovakia became an independent nation. The Bohemian National Alliance published a journal titled The Bohemian Review from 1917.
