= Notre Dame Academy and Convent =

- U.S. National Register of Historic Places
- Omaha Landmark
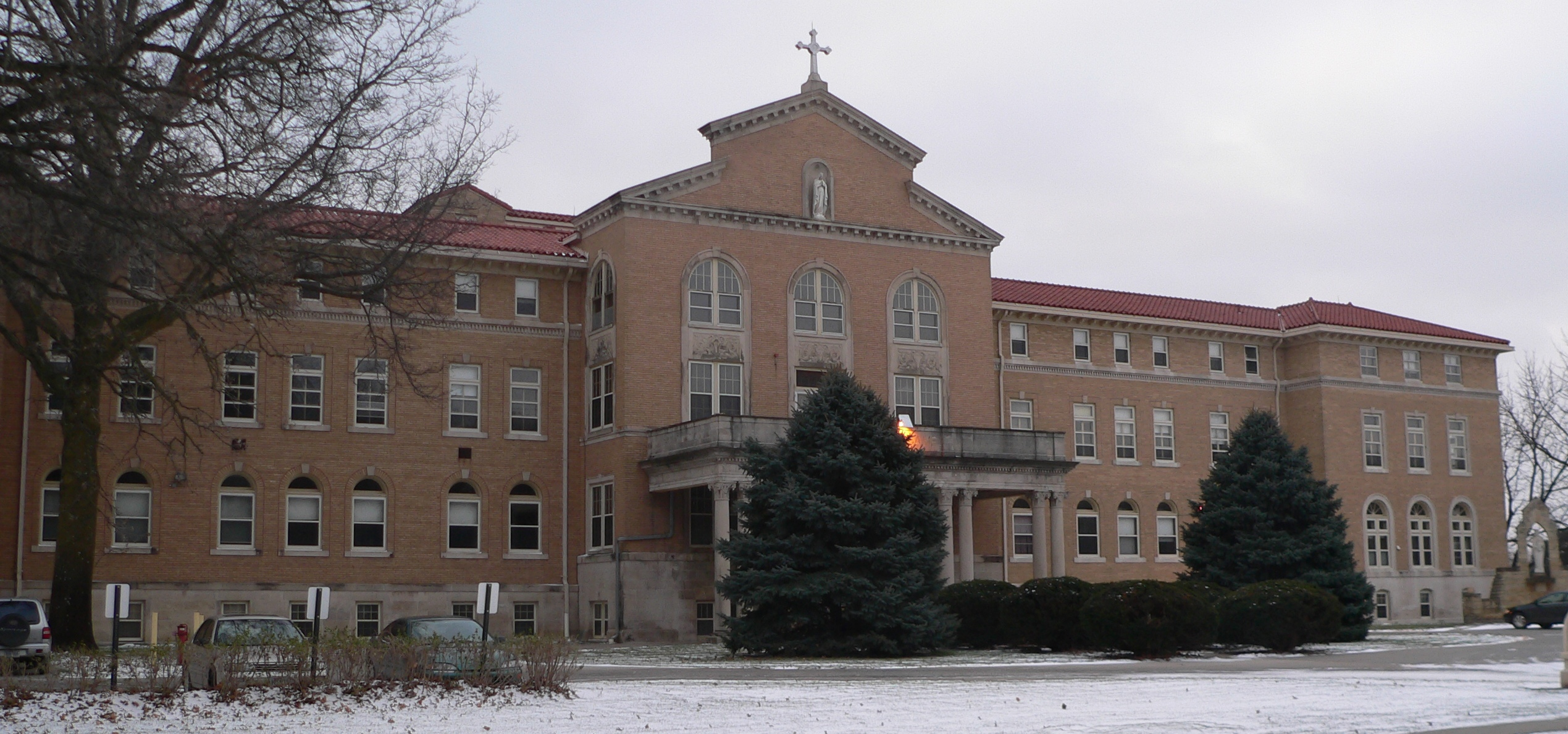

- Location within Nebraska Location within the United States
- Location: Omaha, Nebraska
- Coordinates: 41°20′3.85″N 95°58′5.95″W
- Built: 1926
- Architect: Matthew Lahr, Carl Stangel
- Architectural style: Italian Renaissance Revival
- NRHP reference No.: 98000192

Significant dates
- Added to NRHP: March 5, 1998
- Designated OMAL: April 21, 1998

Notre Dame Academy
- 3501 State Street; Omaha, Nebraska; United States

Information
- Type: Catholic school
- Established: 1925
- Closed: 1974
- School district: Archdiocese of Omaha
- Enrollment: 400 (peak; 1964)
- Affiliation: Catholic Church

The Notre Dame Academy and Convent is located at 3501 State Street in the Florence neighborhood on the north end of Omaha, Nebraska. It is significant for its ethnic association with the Czech population in Nebraska as the only school and convent of the Czechoslovak School Sisters de Notre Dame (this is not the same order as the School Sisters of Notre Dame) in the United States. The building was listed on the National Register of Historic Places in 1998. The groups were home to a high school for girls from 1925 through 1974.

== History ==
The 1880s and 90s saw nearly 100,000 Czechs leave the regions of Bohemia, Moravia, Silesia and Slovakia and emigrate to the United States. Once in the United States the immigrants tended to establish Czech-only neighborhoods and towns that were almost self-sufficient, with Czech-language shops, banks, churches and schools. The Czechoslovak School Sisters of Notre Dame came to the United States to sustain Czech immigrants by teaching the Czech language and culture.

The order purchased Seven Oaks Farm, Father Edward J. Flanagan's original site for Boys Town. Afterwards, Sisters were regular staff at Boys Town.

=== Design ===
Influenced by the 1898 Trans-Mississippi Exposition, Omaha architects Matthew Lahr and Carl Stangel designed the E-shaped convent and school in 1924. It was constructed in phases over the next twenty-six years, all complying with the original design. It was designed in the late Italian Renaissance Revival style.

=== School ===
Notre Dame Academy was sponsored and staffed by the Notre Dame Sisters from 1926 through its merger with Rummel High School to form the present Roncalli Catholic High School in 1974.

== Present ==
In 1997 the Sisters of Notre Dame changed the usage of the property, re-opening it as "Seven Oaks of Florence". The facility provides low-income housing for seniors subsidized by the U.S. Department of Housing and Urban Development.

== See also ==
- Czechs in Omaha, Nebraska
- List of churches in Omaha, Nebraska
