= Bohemian Cafe =

Restaurant in Omaha, Nebraska, U.S.

Coordinates: 41°14′43″N 95°56′01″W

The Bohemian Cafe
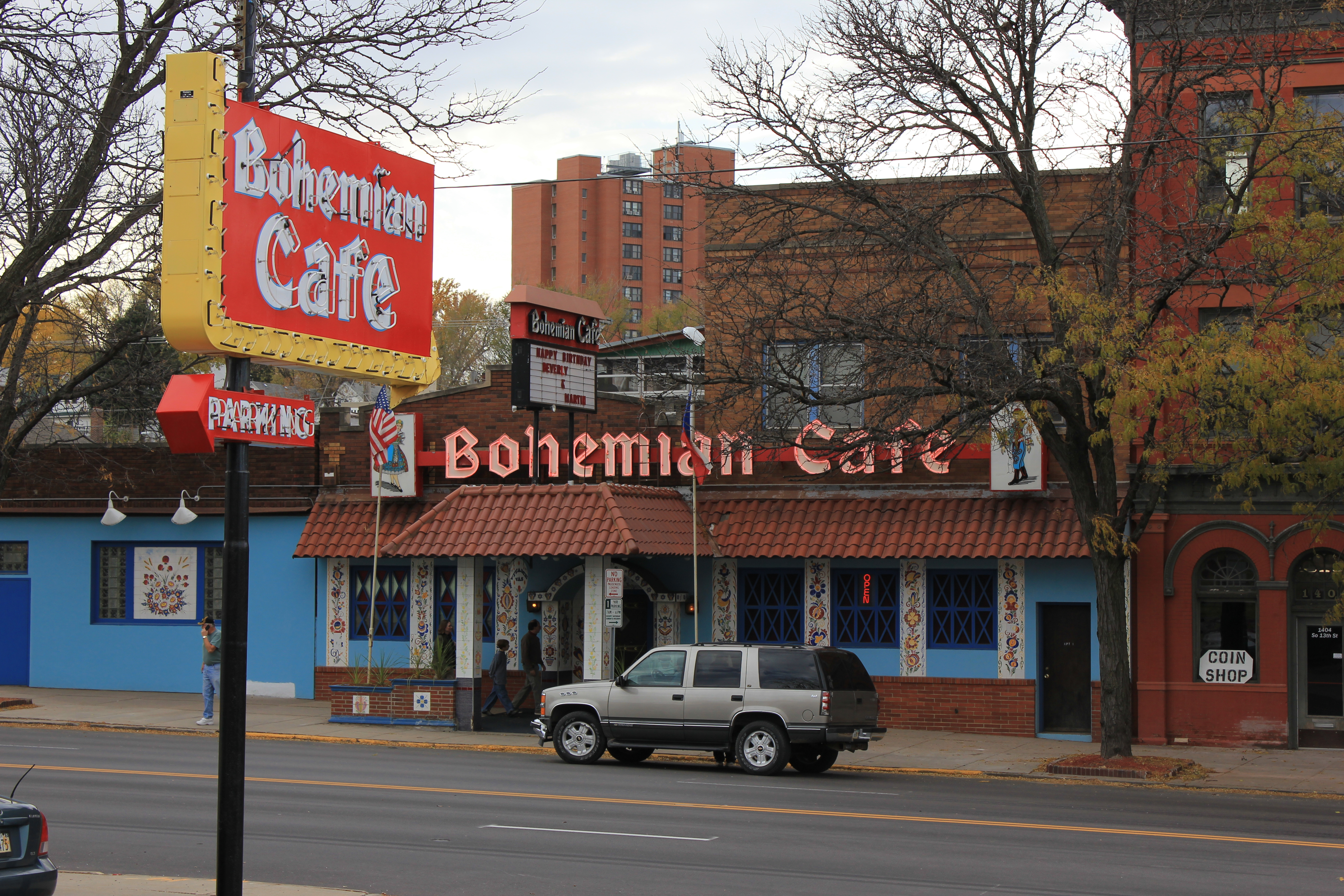

Restaurant information
- Established: 1924; 101 years ago
- Closed: 2016; 9 years ago
- Food type: Czech
- Location: 1406 South 13th Street, Omaha, Nebraska, U.S.A.
- Website: www.bohemiancafe.net

The Bohemian Cafe was located at 1406 South 13th Street in the historic Little Bohemia neighborhood of Omaha, Nebraska. Established in 1924, the cafe sat next to the Prague Hotel. Employees dressed in traditional Czech outfits since its early years, and a small cocktail lounge called the Bohemian Girl was adjoined to the restaurant; the interior decoration, similar to the rest of the building, included hand-painted folk-art pictures. Omaha native Conor Oberst, the lead singer of the rock act Bright Eyes, had been seen drinking at the bar before performing at the nearby Sokol Auditorium.

== History ==
The restaurant was opened in 1924 at 1256 South 13th Street by Louie Macala. In 1947 he sold it to Josef and Ann (Kapoun) Libor, who moved it in 1959 to its present location, which was originally the Bohemian Savings and Loan, and later a Bohemian grocery called Amen's. After their retirement in 1966, their children and grandchildren operated the establishment, with the fourth generation of the Kapoun family pitching in before its closure.

The Bohemian Cafe had a song composed in its early years which has been a featured jingle in several advertisements. Its lyrics are:

"Dumplings and kraut today
At Bohemian Café
Draft beer that’s sparkling, plenty of parking
See you at lunch, Okay?"

The cafe's owners Mert Kapoun, Ronald Kapoun, Marsha Bogatz, Robert Kapoun and Terry Kapoun announced that they would be closing the restaurant on September 24, 2016.

== See also ==
- Czechs in Omaha, Nebraska
