= Stabrie Grocery =

- U.S. National Register of Historic Places
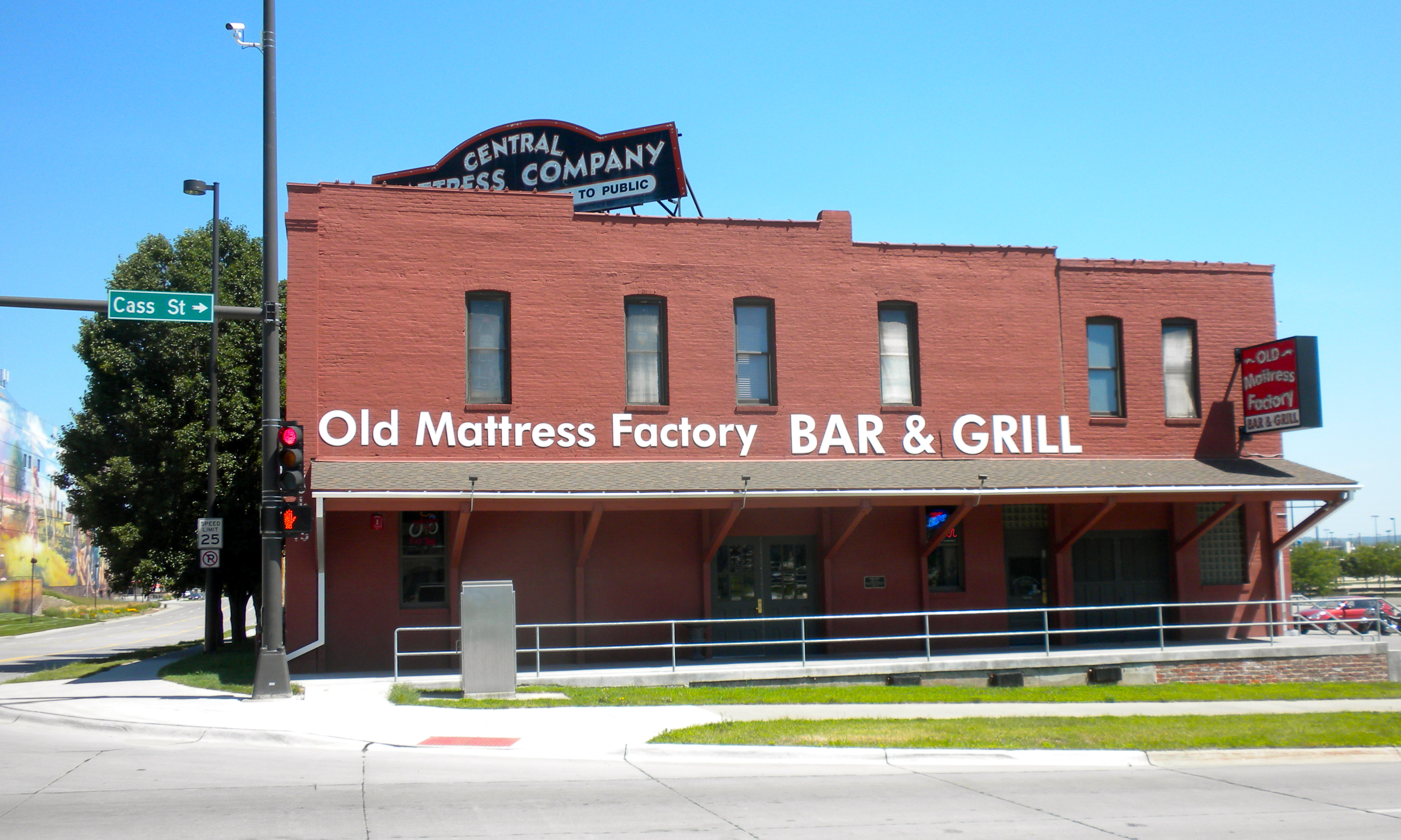

- Location within Nebraska Location within the United States
- Location: Omaha, Nebraska
- Coordinates: 41°15′50″N 95°56′1″W
- Built: 1883
- Architectural style: Early Commercial
- NRHP reference No.: 07001189
- Added to NRHP: November 15, 2007

The Stabrie Grocery is a building located at 501 North 13th Street in the NoDo area of Downtown Omaha, Nebraska. Built in 1882, it was added to the National Register of Historic Places in 2007.

== About ==
When it originally opened in 1883, the building was near Omaha's notorious Burnt District. After originally serving as a grocery, the building later was home to saloons, a grocery wholesaler and the Central Mattress Company factory, which was there for more than 50 years. Today it is the Old Mattress Factory Bar and Grill.

== History ==
History of Stabrie Grocery:

- 1883: The stabire grocery building was constructed in the northeast of Omaha’s central business district to serve the neighborhood.
- 1883-1894: It was operated as a general grocery store conducting both retail and wholesale trades to local residents.
- 1894-1915:The building was used as saloons showcasing the transition of this residential area into commercial or industrial use.
- 1915-1945: As the wholesale grocery market expanded, the building was adopted by a wholesaler
- 1945: The building was occupied by the Central Mattress Company. They manufactured and distributed mattresses to the residents for 50 years.
- Despite the significant changes to the surrounding neighbourhood, industry and the construction of Interstate 480 destroying many buildings around Stabire Grocery, this building survived and became the oldest structure in this area.
- In 2007, it was added to the National Register of Historic Places. Today, An Old Matterss Factory Bar and Grill operates this place.

== See also ==
- History of Omaha
