= 1909 South Omaha anti-Greek riot =

Riot in South Omaha, Nebraska, US

The Greek Town riot was a race riot that took place in South Omaha, Nebraska, on February 21, 1909, during which several Greeks were wounded or injured. A mob of 3,000 Irishmen displaced some of the population of Greek Town, wrecked 30 buildings there, and started a riot.

== Background ==
In February 1909, 36-year-old Greek immigrant John Masourides from a small village near Kalamata was taking English lessons from 17-year-old South Omaha resident Lillian Breese. Irish-American police officer Edward Lowry arrested Masourides and Breese on February 19, having accused Masourides of coercing Breese into a sexual relationship; while Lowry transported them to the jailhouse, Masourides pulled out a handgun and shot Lowry dead. Greek immigrants had come to the city as strikebreakers, and earlier immigrants resented them; among the immigrants who were hostile towards the Greeks were the Irish, who had a large community in South Omaha.

Local newspapers were particularly renowned for their yellow journalism and xenophobia during this period; in one article, the local Omaha Examiner stated that "if California has a Japanese problem, the people of Omaha had better review the growing Italian, Greek, Bulgarian, and Serbian problem in their own back yard". One local newspaper encouraged racism with salacious headlines about the circumstances of Lowry's death. The Omaha Daily News wrote, "Their quarters have been unsanitary; they have insulted women... herded together in lodging houses and living cheaply, Greeks are a menace to the American laboring man – just as the Japs, Italians, and other similar laborers are." The Omaha World Herald headline stated, "Ed Lowry, South Omaha Policeman, Is Shot and Killed By Greek." The bold font was followed by an article which insinuated that it was not just Masourides who was responsible for the conditions that would inevitably end in such a tragedy, but the entire Greek community of South Omaha.

When Masourides was finally apprehended, state legislators Jeremiah Howard (an Irish immigrant) and J.P. Kraus, among others, called a mass meeting of more than 900 men. They "harangued the mob" and raised emotions against the Greeks. The mob, gathering more men along the way, gathered around the South Omaha jail where Masourides was being held. The police decided it was unsafe to keep Masourides there and moved him to the main Omaha jail. The mob followed the police wagon as it left the jail and managed to get their hands on Masourides more than once, at one point almost lynching him.

== Riot ==
After the wagon escaped their grasp, the agitated men turned back towards South Omaha. On February 21, a mob of more than 1,000 men stormed the city's Greek Town area. The New York Times carried an article about the riot stating that 3,000 men were in the mob. They looted homes and businesses while physically assaulting Greeks, as well as Italians and Romanians who they misidentified as Greeks. According to some sources, a 14-year old Greek boy was killed, albeit other sources state that nobody was killed. The entire Greek population of South Omaha was warned to leave the city within one day or risk the ongoing wrath of the mob. During the violence, the South Omaha police could not control the mob. They asked for help from police in Omaha, which was a separate city at the time, but the police there decided not to join in. Within a few days, all of the Greeks living in South Omaha fled the city, moving mostly to Council Bluffs and Sioux City in Iowa or Salt Lake City in Utah.

== Aftermath ==
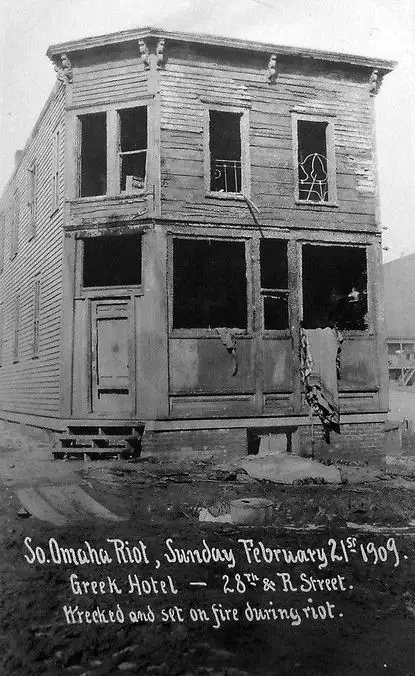
A Greek hotel wrecked and set on fire during the riot

Three months later, Masourides was put on trial. He was convicted and sentenced to death. The Nebraska Supreme Court reversed the decision on appeal, because the mob's bias in the city had denied him a fair trial. During a second trial, Masourides was found guilty of second degree murder and sentenced to 14 years in prison. After five and a half years, he was released at the request of Nebraska's governor and was then deported from the country, with the most recent report on his whereabouts indicating that he moved to Egypt. At the trial, the Greek vice-consul to the United States asked the federal government to explain why Greeks in South Omaha had been kicked out and why the government had failed to protect its Greek residents. The court trial dragged on and no explanation was ever provided.

Within a week of the Omaha incident, reports of the violence set off at least two other violent anti-Greek demonstrations in Kansas City, Missouri and Dayton, Ohio. However, newspapers around the country tended to view the Greeks in Omaha as victims. For example, the Chicago Record-Herald claimed that speakers of "recent origin" had incited the mob by discriminating between Greeks and Americans. The Fort Worth Record cautioned against the evil consequences of a combination of racial and popular feeling. Closer to home, the Omaha World-Herald said that the rioters were the "dregs" of South Omaha.

Nevertheless, at the end, the two state legislators were exonerated:

At the opening session of Nebraska's legislature, Kraus flatly denied making a speech at the Sunday meeting and stated that his only contribution was a resolution directed to the governor and the Nebraska labor commissioner. He went on to defend Representative Howard who, he said, had not used exciting language in his speech. The day following Kraus' statement before the House, a special committee of the Nebraska House of Representatives gave Howard and Kraus "certificates of excellence" because their behavior at the meeting preceding the riot was not found to be "serious".

Shortly before the riot, it was estimated that around 3,000 Greeks lived in South Omaha. Less than a year later, just 59 Greeks remained in the area.

On January 14, 1916, President Woodrow Wilson received a report from his Secretary of State Robert Lansing which described the riot; Wilson subsequently submitted a request for $40,000 (approximately $1.08 million in 2022) to be paid to the Greek government as reparations. The Ottomans also submitted a request for reparations including for the death of Nicholas Jimiks - no other reference to Jimiks can be found.

== See also ==
- Anti-Greek sentiment
- List of incidents of civil unrest in the United States
