= Czechoslovak Museum =

- Established: 1980s
- Location: 2021 U Street; Omaha, Nebraska

The Czechoslovak Museum is located at 2021 U Street in South Omaha, Nebraska, United States.

== History ==
The original Sokol Hall was established in 1911. It did not contain a Czech museum at that time, but was specifically a social hall for the Sokol organization. In the 1980s the museum was added to the building (a new building that replaced the original which had been destroyed by fire). Two Sokol members, Ed and Bea Pavoucek established the museum, gathering display materials from friends, other Sokol members, family, and their travel to Czechoslovakia and later, the Czech Republic. The museum continues today, though both Pavouceks are deceased (Edward in 1997 and Beatrice in 2006). The museum is administered independently of Sokols, though the board membership of the museum overlaps with Sokol leadership. Today the museum highlights the history of Slovaks and Czechs in Omaha. Located at Omaha's only Sokol (est. 1911), the Czechoslovak Museum includes fine hand-cut lead crystal, costumes, photographs, showcases of memorabilia, a Czech/English reference library and a gift shop, which features only items imported from the Czech Republic. The museum is open by appointment.
