= Prague Hotel =

- U.S. National Register of Historic Places
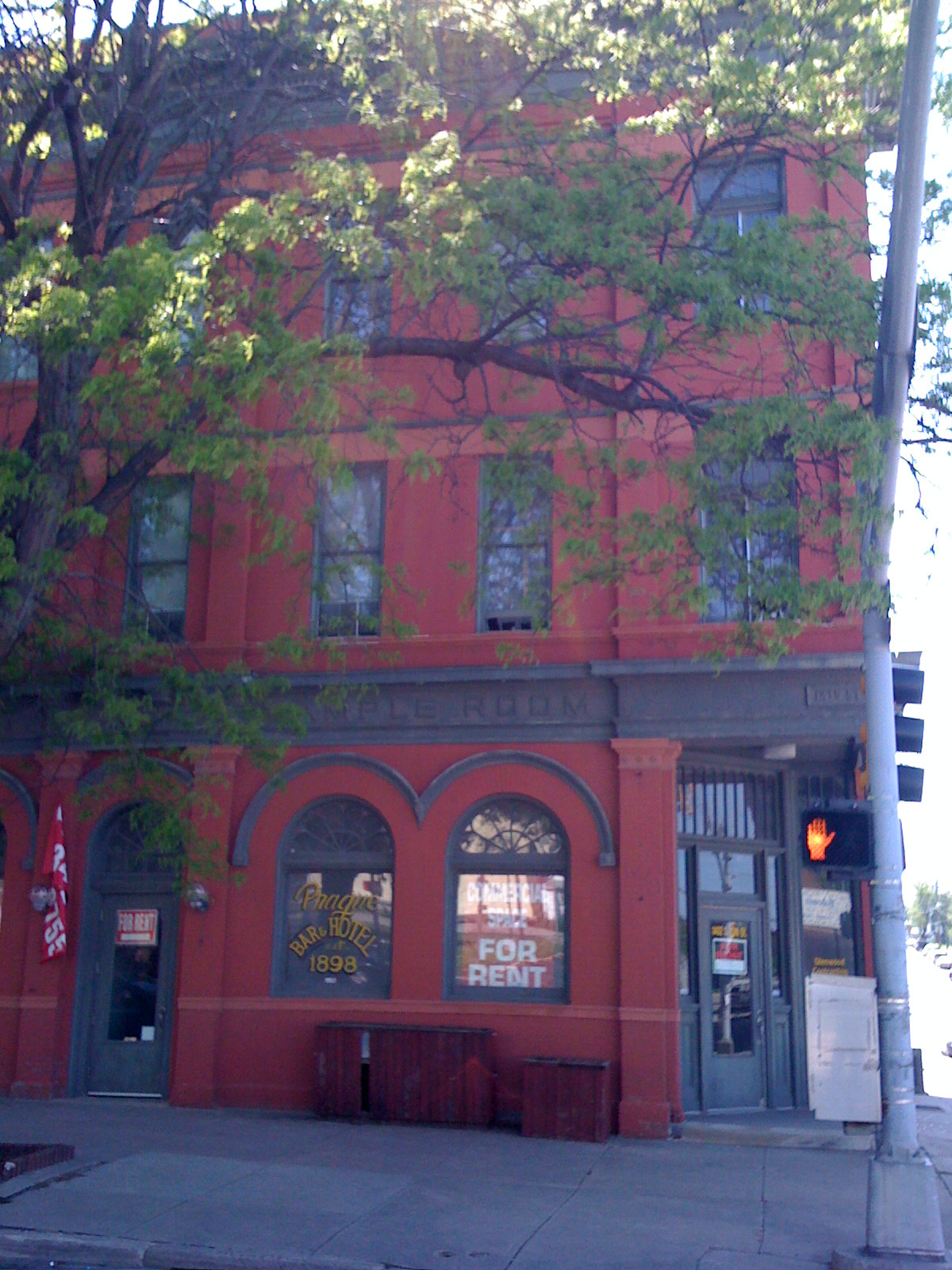
- The Prague Hotel in June 2009

- Location within Nebraska Location within the United States
- Interactive map showing the location of Prague Hotel
- Location: 1402 South 13th Street, Omaha, Nebraska
- Coordinates: 41°14′44.45″N 95°56′7.55″W
- Built: 1898
- Architect: Guth, J.P.
- NRHP reference No.: 87001148
- Added to NRHP: July 9, 1987

The Prague Hotel is located at 1402 South 13th Street on the southwest corner of South 13th and William Streets in the heart of the Little Bohemia neighborhood of Omaha, Nebraska. Designed by Joseph Guth and built−in 1898, this building was listed on the National Register of Historic Places in 1987.

== History ==
In 1869, Vaclav Stepanek built the first Czech dance hall where the Prague Hotel now stands. Gottlieb Storz built the Prague Hotel in 1898, as a three-story brick building that provided Nebraska's Czech immigrants with familiarities in their new country. It opened on June 1, 1898. In addition to a 25-room hotel, it included a restaurant and a tavern. A sign in the tavern window proclaimed in Czech, "Pražská Pivnice, Dámy Jsou Vítány", which translated to English meant "Prague Hotel, Ladies Are Invited". The tavern closed in 1942. For more than forty years it had remained the only hotel catering to Bohemians between Chicago and the Pacific Coast.

In 1987 the building was rehabilitated and converted into apartments. Local architectural firm Prochaska & Associates won awards for their renovation work on the building.

== See also ==
- History of Omaha, Nebraska
- Bohemian Cafe
