= Admiral Theatre (Omaha) =

Theatre in Nebraska, US

Coordinates: 41°14′19″N 95°56′02″W

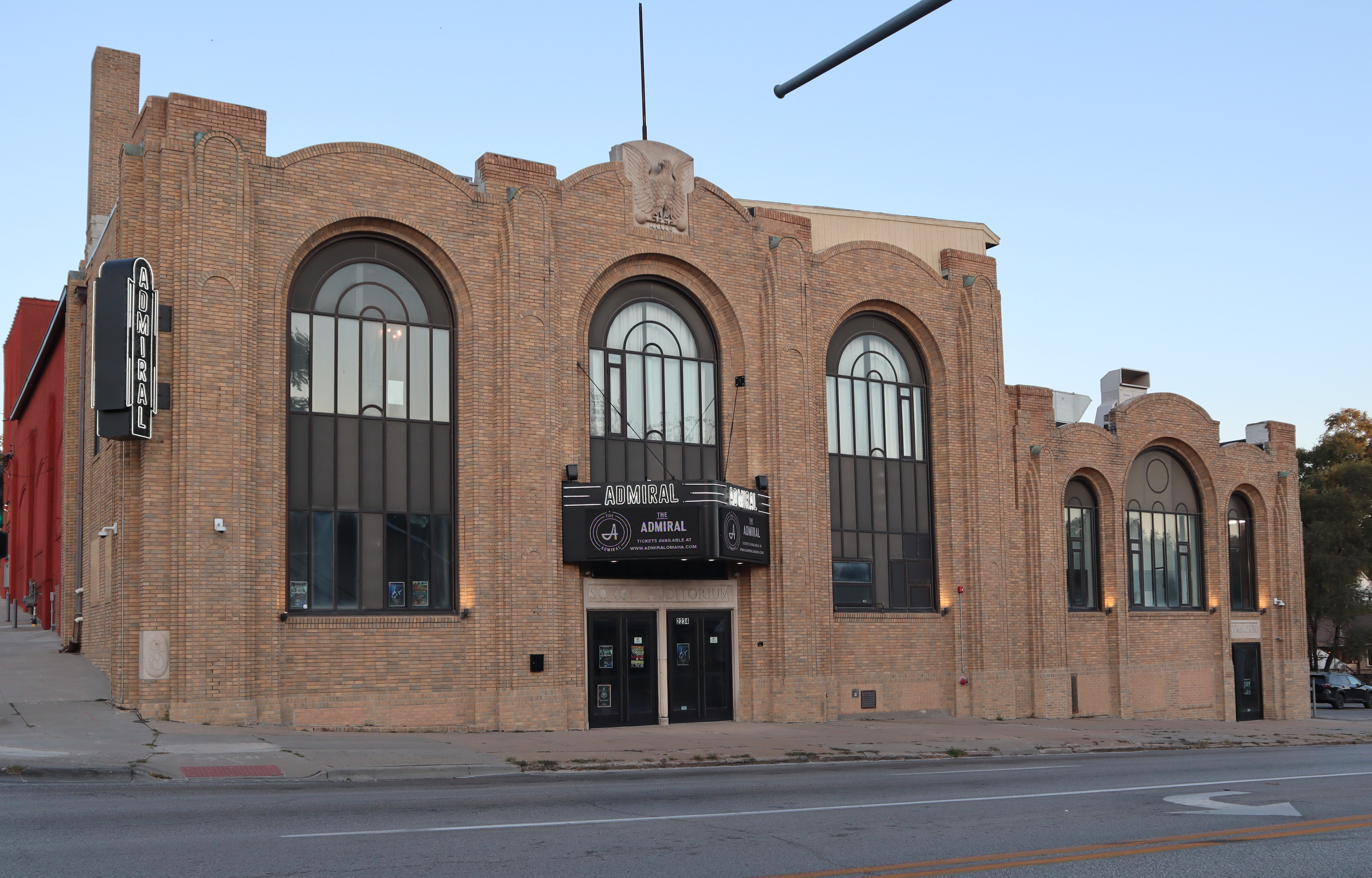
- The Admiral Theatre in 2024
- Interactive map of Admiral Theatre
- Former names: Sokol Auditorium
- Address: 2234 South 13th Street; Omaha, Nebraska; United States
- Owner: 1% Productions
- Capacity: 1,500

Construction
- Groundbreaking: April 19, 1926
- Opened: October 31, 1926
- Renovated: 2021-2022
- Cost: $100,000
- Architect: Edward J. Sessinghaus

The Admiral Theatre is located at 2234 South 13th Street in the Little Bohemia neighborhood of South Omaha, Nebraska. It is a local icon for its historical context, as well as modern musical performances for rock and country music. It has a maximum capacity of 1,500. It was built in 1926, originally known as the Sokol Auditorium, and was used to house the Omaha Czech community's social activities. After undergoing major renovations in 2021, the auditorium was rebranded as the Admiral Theater in 2022.

== History ==
The Admiral Theatre was originally announced as the Sokol Auditorium in April 1926. The building began construction in on April 19, 1926 and was officially dedicated in October 1926. It was mainly built to house the Omaha Czech community's social activities. Sokols ("falcons" in Czech) were fraternal (and sororal) organizations first founded in Bohemia to promote equality, harmony, and fraternity. As one of four in Omaha, the Sokol Auditorium was utilized for meetings by twenty-five Bohemian lodges, as well as ethnic Italians and American groups. The hall also offered recreation classes for its members.

In 2021, the venue was purchased by 1% Productions for $1.6 million. Upon purchase, 1% Productions announced a $2.5 million renovation project for the auditorium. Renovations were completed in July 2022, with the auditorium renamed the Admiral Theater. The name "Admiral Theater" comes from a defunct Omaha movie theater of the same name which was located at South 40th and Farnam Streets. It was in operation from 1942 to 1983 before being demolished in 1997.

== Legacy ==
The Admiral Theatre's basement was commonly referred to as "Sokol Underground" and was popularly used for concerts in the 1990s and 2000s. The Sokol Auditorium has been mentioned specifically in a number of songs from the last twenty years. The Faint mentions the Sokol in the song, "Amorous in Bauhaus Fashion," from the album Media. They Might Be Giants wrote the song, "Sokol Auditorium," about the venue. Neva Dinova's music video for "Yellow Datsun," was filmed at the Auditorium, and Johnny Rioux of the Street Dogs collapsed on stage on February 27, 2007 of an apparent seizure while his band was opening for Flogging Molly.

== See also ==
- Music in Omaha
