= Omaha Daily Bee =

Newspaper in Nebraska, United States

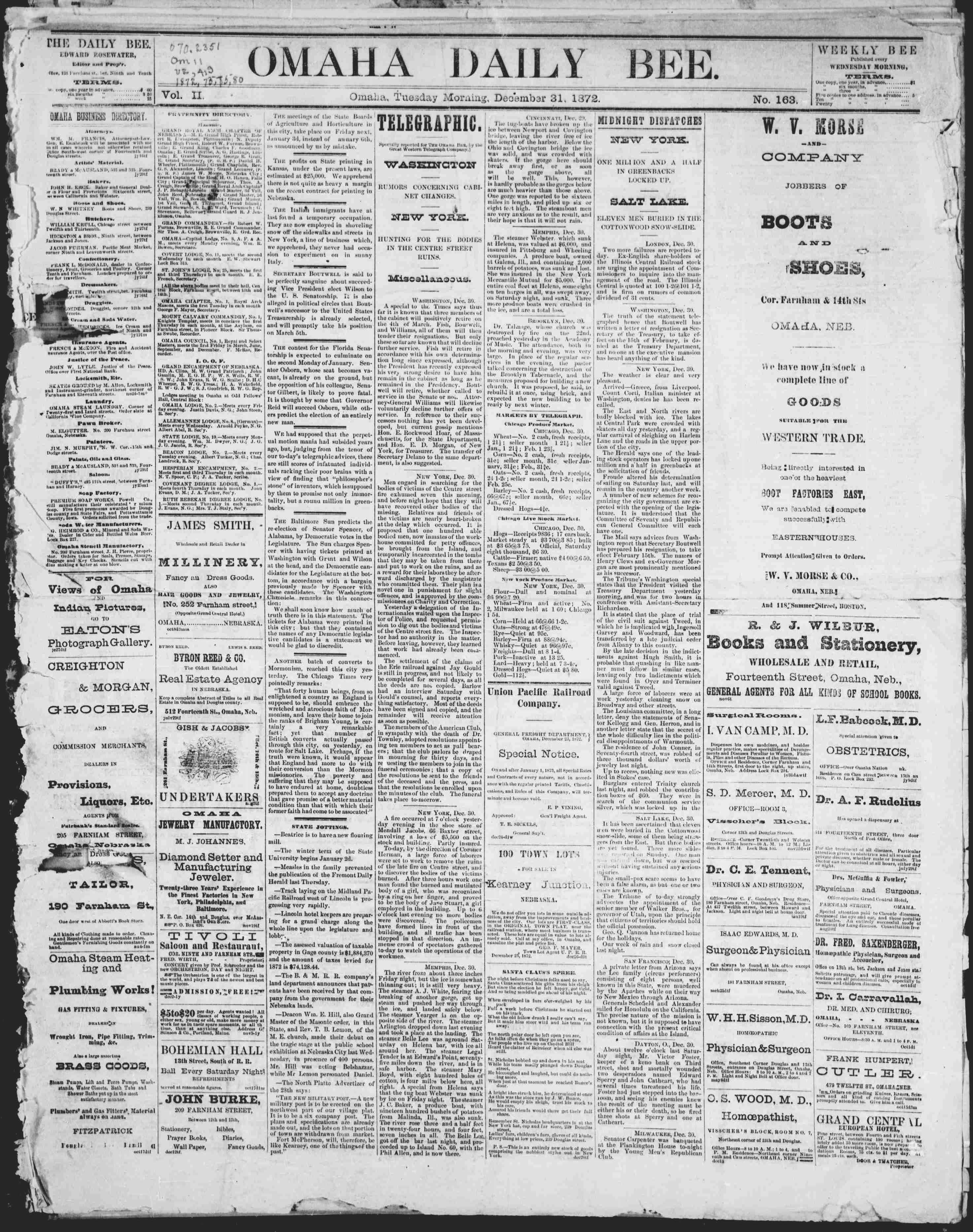
- Title page of the issue dated December 31, 1872
- Type: Daily newspaper
- Format: Tabloid
- Editor: Edward Rosewater
- Founded: May 8, 1871
- Ceased publication: 1927; Omaha Bee-News, 1927–1937
- Language: English
- Headquarters: Omaha
- ISSN: 2169-7264
- OCLC number: 42958170

The Omaha Daily Bee, in Nebraska, United States, was a leading Republican newspaper that was active in the late 19th and early 20th century. The paper's editorial slant frequently pitted it against the Omaha Herald, the Omaha Republican and other local papers. After a 1927 merger, it was published as the Bee-News until folding in 1937.

== History ==
It was founded as a pioneer newspaper in Omaha, Nebraska, on May 8, 1871, by Edward Rosewater a Jewish immigrant from Bohemia who supported abolition and fought in the Union Army. The Bee was Nebraska's first regional newspaper, and was regarded nationally for its advocacy and success. By 1875 the Bee had a circulation of 2,520 and by 1882 circulation had increased to 6,100. Although it was primarily a local paper, the Bee also carried national and regional news in a simple eight column design.

The paper's slogan was "Industry, Frugality and Service." in 1888 Rosewater built the Bee Building to accommodate its presses, which were claimed to be the largest in the country. After his father carried the paper to national fame before his death in 1906, the paper began to slip under his son Victor Rosewater's control. The Bee was criticized for sensationalizing alleged attacks by black men in 1919 with headlines such as ""Omaha Mob Hangs and Burns Negro Who Assaulted Girl" which escalated inter-racial conflict and justified the Omaha Race Riot of 1919. It involved three deaths and thousands of dollars in property damages. Another newspaper, Omaha World-Herald published reports condemning the violence with the headline "Frenzied thousands join the orgy of blood and fire".

The newspaper was sold to millionaire Nelson B. Updike, a local grain dealer, in 1920. In 1927, Updike purchased the Omaha Daily News and merged his papers to form the Bee-News. In June 1928 the Bee-News was sold to William Randolph Hearst. In October 1937, Hearst sold the paper to the Omaha World-Herald for $750,000, which promptly discontinued its publication.

According to a 1954 World-Herald report, "Edward Rosewater actually did not have journalism in mind when he launched the first edition of the Bee on June 19, 1871, to influence the public in favor of the ratification of a legislative bill originated by him, creating the Board of Education."

Bee and Bee-News alumni include Don Hollenbeck, who later worked for CBS News.

Early 20th century American author Elizabeth Higgins Sullivan worked for the Omaha Daily Bee newspaper and various Chicago daily newspapers. She was devoted to Women's suffrage and the social settlement movement.
