= Sheely Packing Company =

Coordinates: 41°14′21″N 95°57′07″W

The Sheely Packing Company was located at South 27th Avenue and Martha Street in South Omaha, Nebraska. The plant was the namesake of the surrounding Sheelytown neighborhood, which was predominantly Polish, with many other immigrants as well. It was the first substantial meatpacking operation in Omaha, which preceded the founding of the city's large meatpacking industry.

== History ==
Founded by former South Omaha fire chief Joseph Sheely, the Sheely Packing Company was established when Sheely bought the stockyards that were established by David Cook in 1871. It was January 1880. Joseph was one of the incorporators of the Union Stock Yards Company of Omaha in the 1870s. His packing plant sat on the new South Omaha Terminal Railway, southeast of Hanscom Park. Sheely's company processed 15,000 hogs annually until his plant burnt down in 1886.

== See also ==
- History of Omaha, Nebraska
- Economy of Omaha, Nebraska
