= Sheelytown (Omaha) =

Coordinates: 41°14′01″N 95°56′52″W

Sheelytown was a historic ethnic neighborhood in South Omaha, Nebraska, USA with populations of Irish, Polish and other first generation immigrants. Located north of the Union Stockyards, it was bounded by Edward Creighton Boulevard on the north, Vinton Street on the south, South 24th Street to the east, and 35th Street to the west. Sheelytown was named for the Sheely Brothers Packing Houses that were located in the area. Sheelytown was annexed by Omaha in 1887. The Omaha Quartermaster Depot was built just east of the community across the Union Pacific tracks.

== History ==
Joseph Sheely ran the Sheely Packing Company, a meat packing plant near the railroad tracks southeast of Hanscom Park. Workers in his plant occupied a small company town immediately next to the plant that was named after their boss. Sheelytown was first occupied by Irish, who came in the 1860s and

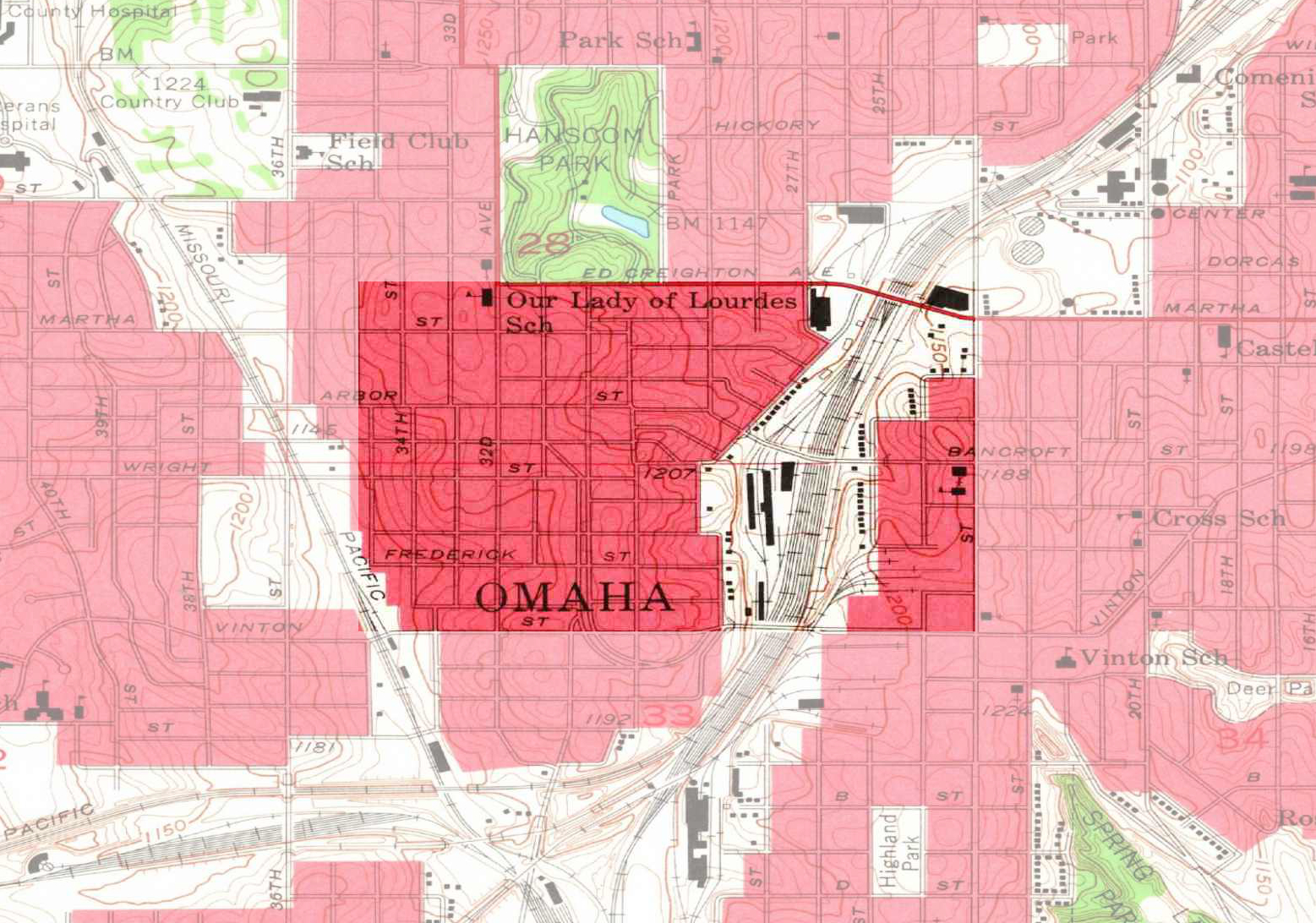
Pre-interstate system boundary map of Sheelytown.

1870s to work in the stockyards and meatpacking plants. Later when Polish and Czech immigrants arrived, they also settled in Sheelytown and South Omaha. The community was a working class and poor area, often regarded as dirty and "uncivilized" by wealthier Omahans. In the early decades of the 20th century, the community had ex-officio mayors for many years, including Nicodemus Dargaczewski, who was a close ally of political bosses "Cowboy" James Dahlman and Tom Dennison.

Around the start of the 20th century, members of the Hanscom Park Methodist Episcopal Church became concerned with the "lawlessness and destitute behavior" of workers in the neighborhood. They organized dances to compete with the "loose establishments" in Sheelytown. The dances routinely caused a stir among local residents, but were continuously held for many years.

== Legacy ==
Adjacent to Sheelytown is the commercial area now called the Vinton Street Commercial Historic District. In 2006 it was listed on the National Register of Historic Places.

The Polonairs of Omaha is a polka band that recorded an album called Sheelytown On Parade on the Czech Records label.

== Bibliography ==
- Larsen, L. and Cottrell, B. (1997) The Gate City: A History of Omaha. University of Nebraska Press. p. 158.
- Sullenger, T.E. (1937) "Problems of Ethnic Assimilation in Omaha," Social Forces, 15 (3) March. pp. 402–410.
