= South Omaha Main Street Historic District =

Historic district in Nebraska, United States

- U.S. National Register of Historic Places
- U.S. Historic district
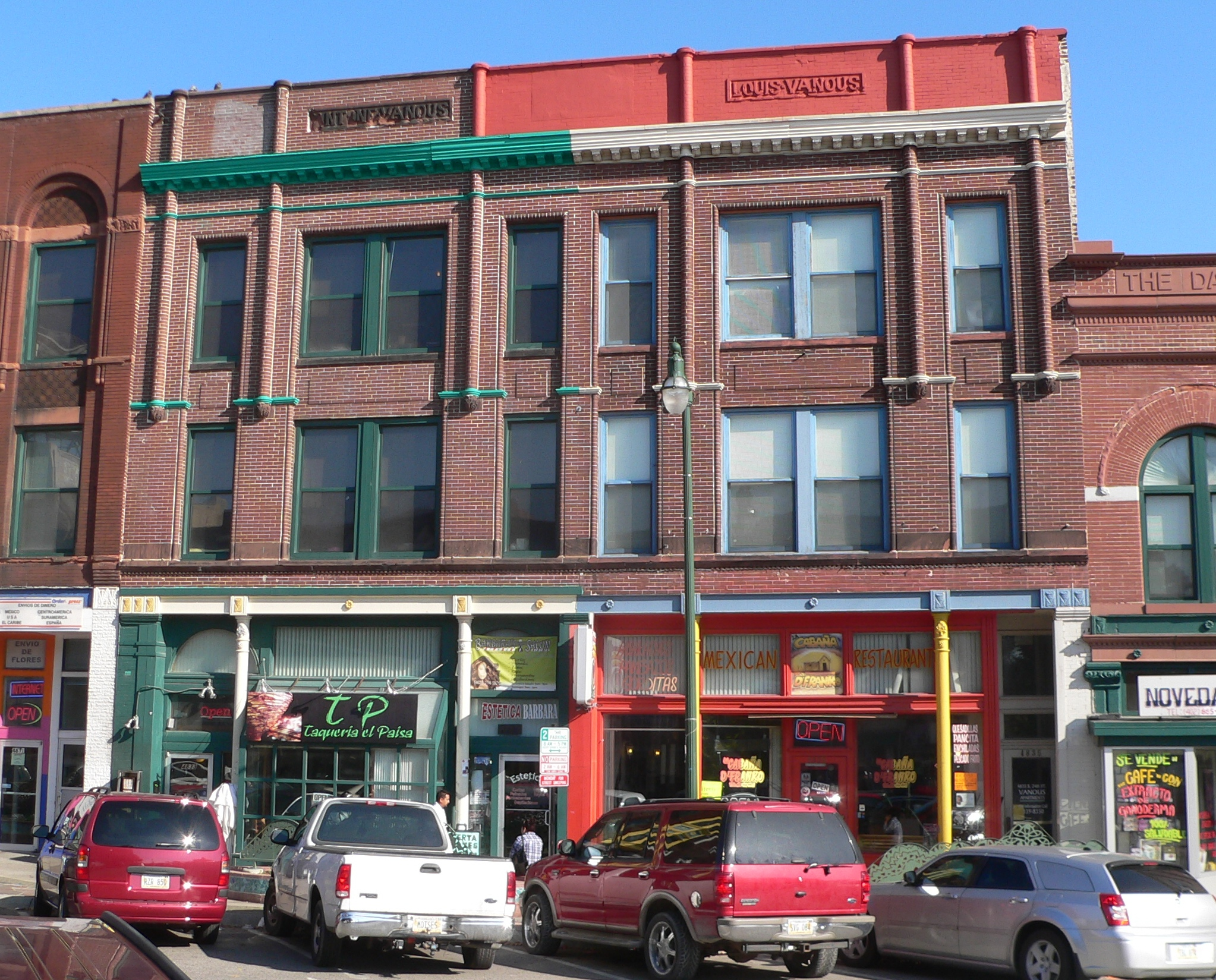
- Vanous Block, at 4833-35 S. 24th Street

- Location within Nebraska Location within the United States
- Location: Roughly S. 24th St. between M and O Sts., Omaha, Nebraska
- Coordinates: 41°12′35″N 95°56′49″W
- Area: 12.9 acres (5.2 ha)
- Architect: Latenser, John, & Sons; Allen, James T.
- Architectural style: Late 19th And Early 20th Century American Movements, Classical Revival, Romanesque
- NRHP reference No.: 88002828 (original); 100009518 (increase)

Significant dates
- Added to NRHP: February 14, 1989
- Boundary increase: November 6, 2023

The South Omaha Main Street Historic District is located along South 24th Street between M and O Streets in South Omaha, Nebraska. It was added to the National Register of Historic Places in 1989. Home to dozens of historically important buildings, including the Packer's National Bank Building, the historic district included 129 acres (0.52 km^{2}) and more than 32 buildings when listed.

== About ==
The site of a historically vital commercial district in the History of Omaha, the South Omaha Main Street Historic District once comprised the urban core of the City of South Omaha, Nebraska. It includes businesses, the former South Omaha City Hall, a correctional facility, banks, a post office, professional offices, and specialty stores.

Renowned for its cultural influences, including the historic location of Omaha's Greek, Russian, Polish and Czech immigrant communities, as well as the city's current growing Latino community, including Mexicans.

== Contributing properties ==
The Carpenter Building is one such building in the South Omaha Main Street Historic District, built in 1916 as a one-story brick structure. The building housed a hardware store, until a fire in 1988. A rehabilitation in 1990 allowed the building to continue being used. Packer's National Bank Building was listed on the National Register of Historic Places in 1985. Founded in 1891, the bank served employees of the Union Stock Yards Company of Omaha and the associated meat packing industry in South Omaha.

The Vanous Block, built in 1892, is a three-story contributing property for the district that was originally a warehouse. A 1992 rehabilitation converted it into a commercial and rental residential space. The Stockman Publishing Company building is a two-story building constructed in 1890 that was converted to office and residential space in 1992. The Brandes Block is a three-story brick building that was built in 1889. The building was converted to a mixed commercial and rental residential use in 1991. The Roseland Theater, built in the 1920s, was a theater through the mid-1980s. In 1991 the building was converted into commercial and rental residential use. The Commercial Building is a one-story brick building that was originally a livestock supply dealership. The building was converted to retail and warehouse space in 1994.

=== Notable locations ===
Notable locations in South Omaha - alphabetical order
Location	Name	Built	Notes
	Carpenter Building	1916	A rehabilitation in 1990 allowed the building to continue being used.
	Packer's National Bank Building	1891	
	Vanous Block	1892	Rehabilitated in 1992.
	Stockman Publishing Company Building	1890	Converted to office and residential space in 1992.
	Brandes Block	1889	Converted to a mixed commercial and rental residential use in 1991.
	Roseland Theater		
	Commercial Building		Converted to retail and warehouse space in 1994.

== See also ==
- History of Omaha, Nebraska
- North 24th Street
