= St. John's Greek Orthodox Church (Omaha, Nebraska) =

Church in Nebraska, United States

Coordinates: 41°15′14″N 95°57′22″W

St. John the Baptist Greek Orthodox Church
- St. John the Baptist Greek Orthodox Church
- Location: 602 Park Avenue; Omaha, Nebraska 68105
- Country: United States
- Denomination: Greek Orthodox
- Website: Church

History
- Founded: 1907
- Dedicated: May 4, 1958

Architecture
- Architect: John Latenser, Sr.
- Style: Byzantine
- Years built: 1908

Administration
- Diocese: Metropolis of Denver

Clergy
- Bishop: Metropolitan Isaiah of Denver
- Priest: Rev. Fr. Peter J. Pappas

St. John the Baptist Greek Orthodox Church is located at 602 Park Avenue in Midtown Omaha, Nebraska. The original congregation was formed in 1907 to meet the needs of Omaha's then-burgeoning Greek community. The current building is a city landmark that was originally constructed in 1908 for Omaha's Temple Israel, and was sold to the St. John's parish in 1951.

== History ==
After large scale immigration to Omaha starting at the turn of the 20th century, in 1908 Omaha's Greeks built Saint John's Greek Orthodox Church at 16th and Martha Streets in South Omaha. The parish finalized the purchase of the former Temple Israel on December 16, 1951. The new church was occupied in 1953 and the original church was sold. The Right Reverend Bishop Ezekiel of the Chicago Diocese officiated the consecration of the new home of Saint John the Baptist parish on May 4, 1958.

The new building was designed by noted Omaha architect John Latenser, Sr. and built in 1908. Omaha's only Byzantine-style architecture Christian church in the city. When the parish celebrated its 100th anniversary in June 2008, Omaha-native film director and Oscar-winner Alexander Payne participated in festivities. "When you see the beauty of the church, you see why people would never want to leave it," Payne said of the church, where he served as an altar boy.
