= Rocheford & Gould =

Construction contractors in Omaha, Nebraska

- Industry: Construction
- Fate: Dissolved in 1906
- Successor: William Rocheford & Son and F. P. Gould & Son
- Headquarters: Omaha, Nebraska, United States
- Key people: William M. Rocheford, Sr. and Franklin Pierce Gould

Rocheford & Gould were brick manufacturers and construction contractors in early Omaha, Nebraska. The firm built numerous brick structures during Omaha's transition from the wooden buildings of Nebraska's territorial days to more permanent structures. The buildings the firm built included breweries, schools, packing houses, business blocks, Vaudeville theaters, street car barns and power houses, and civic buildings. Many of the structures the firm built have been demolished but a few of their earliest structures still exist and are listed on the National Register of Historic Places.

== History ==
William Rocheford was born in St. Albans, Vermont, on February 22, 1851. As the son of a mason, Rocheford learned the construction trade early. Shortly after arriving in Omaha in 1879, Rocheford went to work with Henry Livesey, a brickmaker and contractor. In 1880, Rocheford entered the brickmaking and general contracting business with Frank P. Gould, a native of New York. Their new firm, Rocheford & Gould, established a brickyard at Thirteenth and Frederick Streets in Omaha, Nebraska. By 1892, it was reported that the firm's kilns were making 50,000 bricks a day. In 1918, Herman Kritenbrink leased the operation. The brickyard was abandoned in 1928 when the clay ran out. Finally in 1945, the 125-foot smokestack was demolished in a controlled blast after the Omaha Street Commissioner deemed it a nuisance and ordered its removal.

The firm of Rocheford & Gould dissolved in 1906, although neither partner retired from the construction business. Frank Gould took over the operation of the brickyard operation and formed a commercial construction company with his son. William Rocheford also formed a construction company with his son, but unlike the Goulds, Rocheford's new company was focused primarily on building residential rental properties.

William Rocheford died on July 10, 1913, when the automobile he was driving was hit by a street railway car. Among the pallbearers at William Rocheford's funeral were his former business partner, Frank P. Gould, and George Fisher, a partner in the Omaha architectural firm of Mendelssohn, Fisher and Lawrie. Frank Gould died on January 24, 1916, after a long illness.

== Notable buildings ==
Works by Hadden, Rocheford & Gould

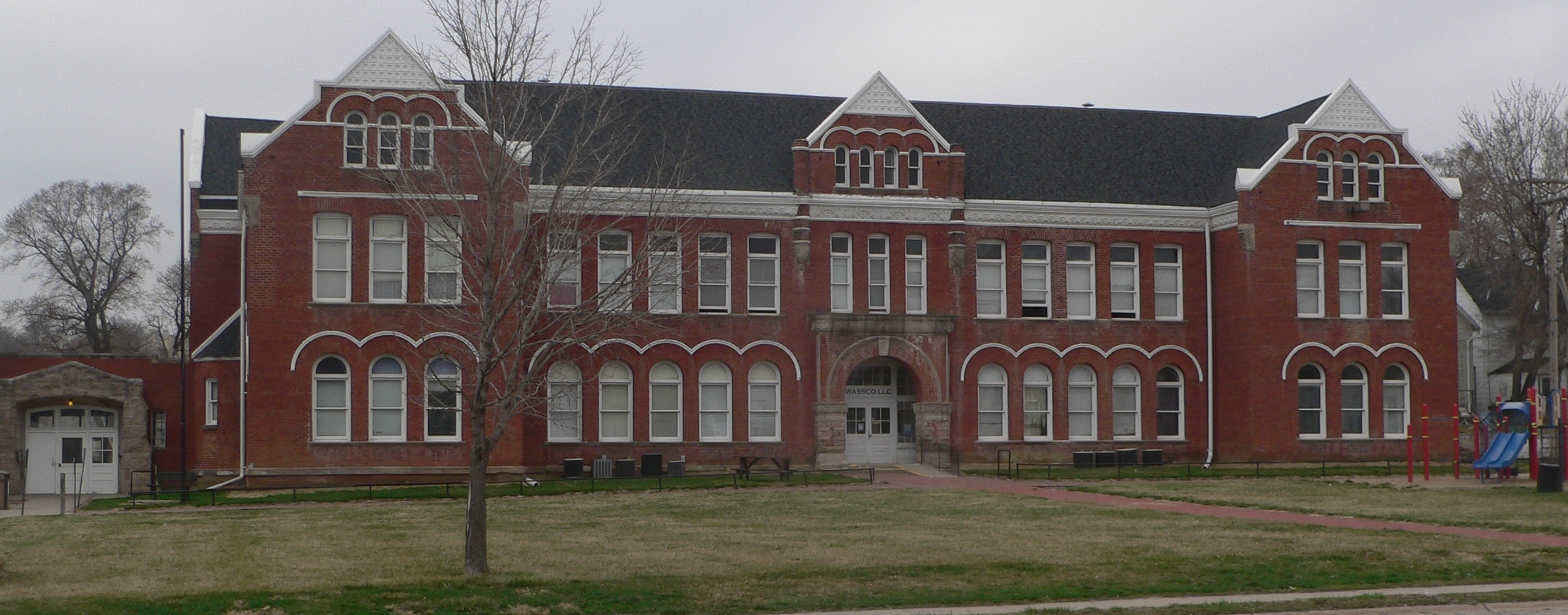
Mason School, Omaha, Nebraska

- Mason School, built in 1888 in Omaha, Nebraska. The structure at 1012 South 24th Street, designed by Mendelssohn, Fisher and Lawrie, was added to the National Register of Historic Places in 1986.

Works by Rocheford, Gould & Gladden

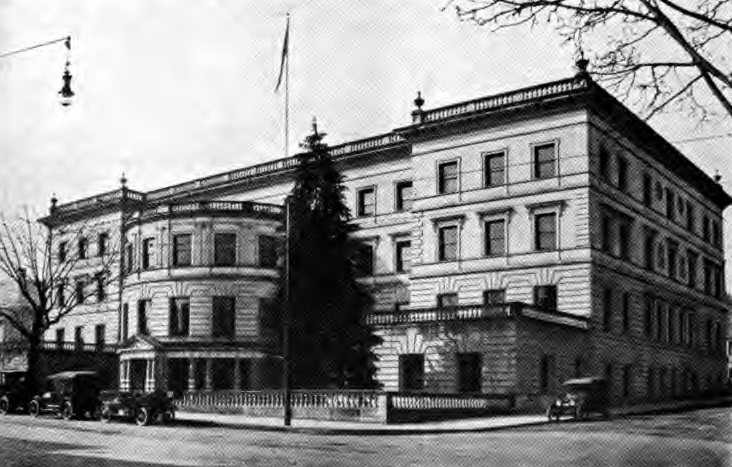
Portland, Oregon City Hall circa 1922

- Portland City Hall, built in 1893 in Portland, Oregon. The building was added to the National Register of Historic Places on November 21, 1974.

Works by Rocheford & Gould

- Knutsford Hotel, built in 1891 in Salt Lake City, Utah. This 132-foot-by-132-foot upscale hotel with 250 rooms was built completely of granite at a cost of $750,000. The hotel was designed by Omaha architects Mendelssohn, Fisher and Lawrie. It was converted to a department store before ultimately being demolished.
- Krug Brewery built in 1893 at 24th and Vinton Streets in Omaha, Nebraska. The plant was later purchased by Falstaff Brewery. It has been demolished.
- Creighton Orpheum Theater, built in 1895 in Omaha, Nebraska. The first brick was laid on March 10, 1895. The work progressed so rapidly that the first performance was held on August 22, 1895. The original name of the theater was the John A. Creighton Theater. Its name changed to the Creighton Orpheum Theater in 1898 when it joined the Orpheum Circuit. It was demolished in 1926 and the current Orpheum Theater built on the site.
- Creighton Medical College, designed by John Latenser and built in 1895 at the corner of 14th and Davenport Streets on the Creighton College campus in Omaha, Nebraska. It has been demolished.
- Armour Packing Plant, built in 1897 at South 29th and Q Streets in South Omaha, Nebraska. It has been demolished.
- Cass School, built in 1899 in Omaha, Nebraska.
- Metz Brewery Addition, built in 1899 in Omaha, Nebraska.
- Bennett's Department Store, built in 1901 in Downtown Omaha, Nebraska.
- The Auditorium, the original city auditorium in Omaha, Nebraska. It was built in 1903 at Fifteenth and Howard Streets. It was replaced by the Omaha Civic Auditorium.
- Krug Theater, built in 1903 at 419 South 15th Street in Omaha, Nebraska.
- Crane & Co. Building, built in 1905 in Omaha, Nebraska.
- Auditorium Addition, The Creighton Memorial St. Joseph Hospital, in Omaha, Nebraska.
- McCague Building, 15th and Dodge Streets in Omaha, Nebraska.
- Barker Block in Omaha, Nebraska.

works by Rocheford & Son

- Creighton Pharmacy College, built in 1909 as an addition to the Creighton Medical College. It has been demolished.

Works by F. P. Gould & Son

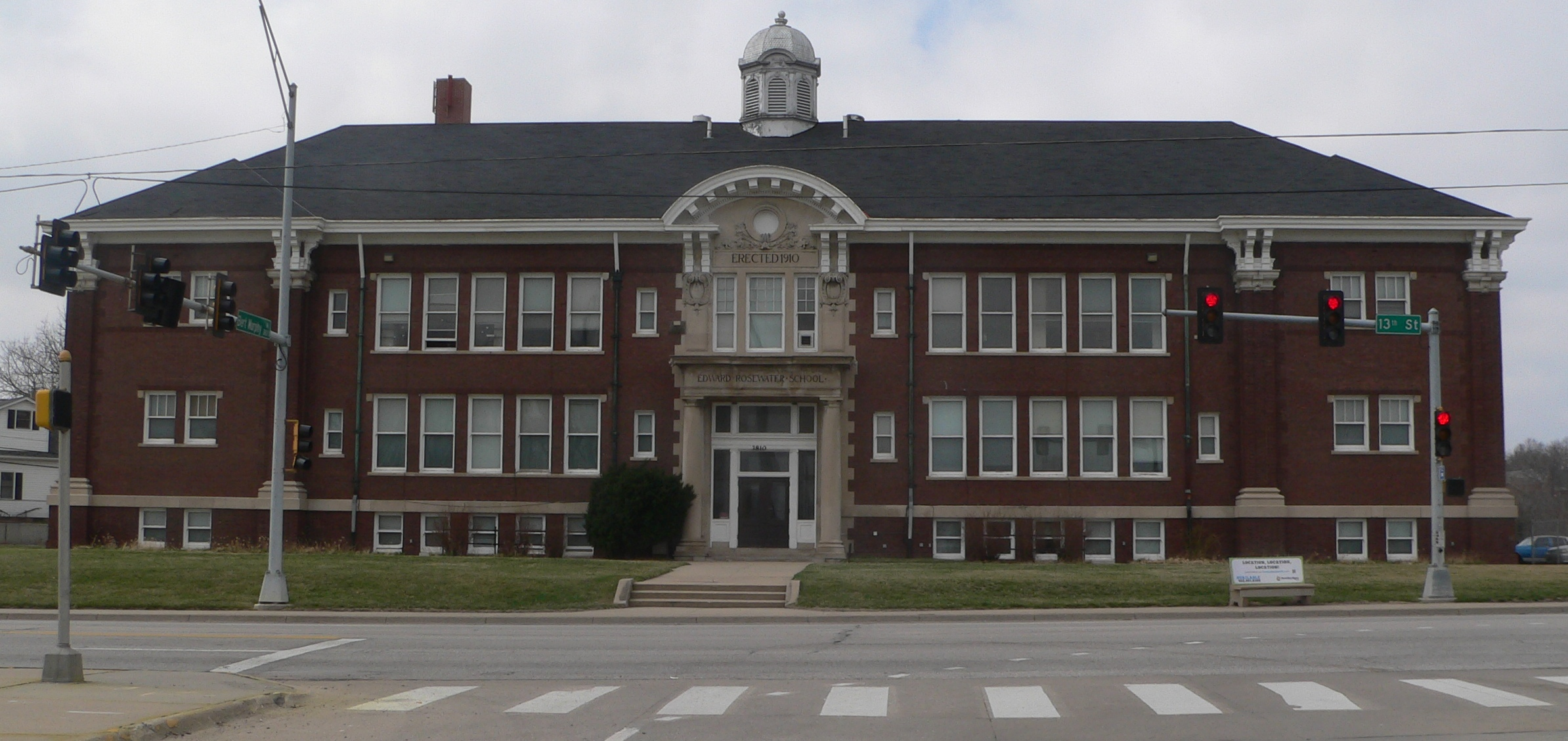
Rosewater School, Omaha, Nebraska

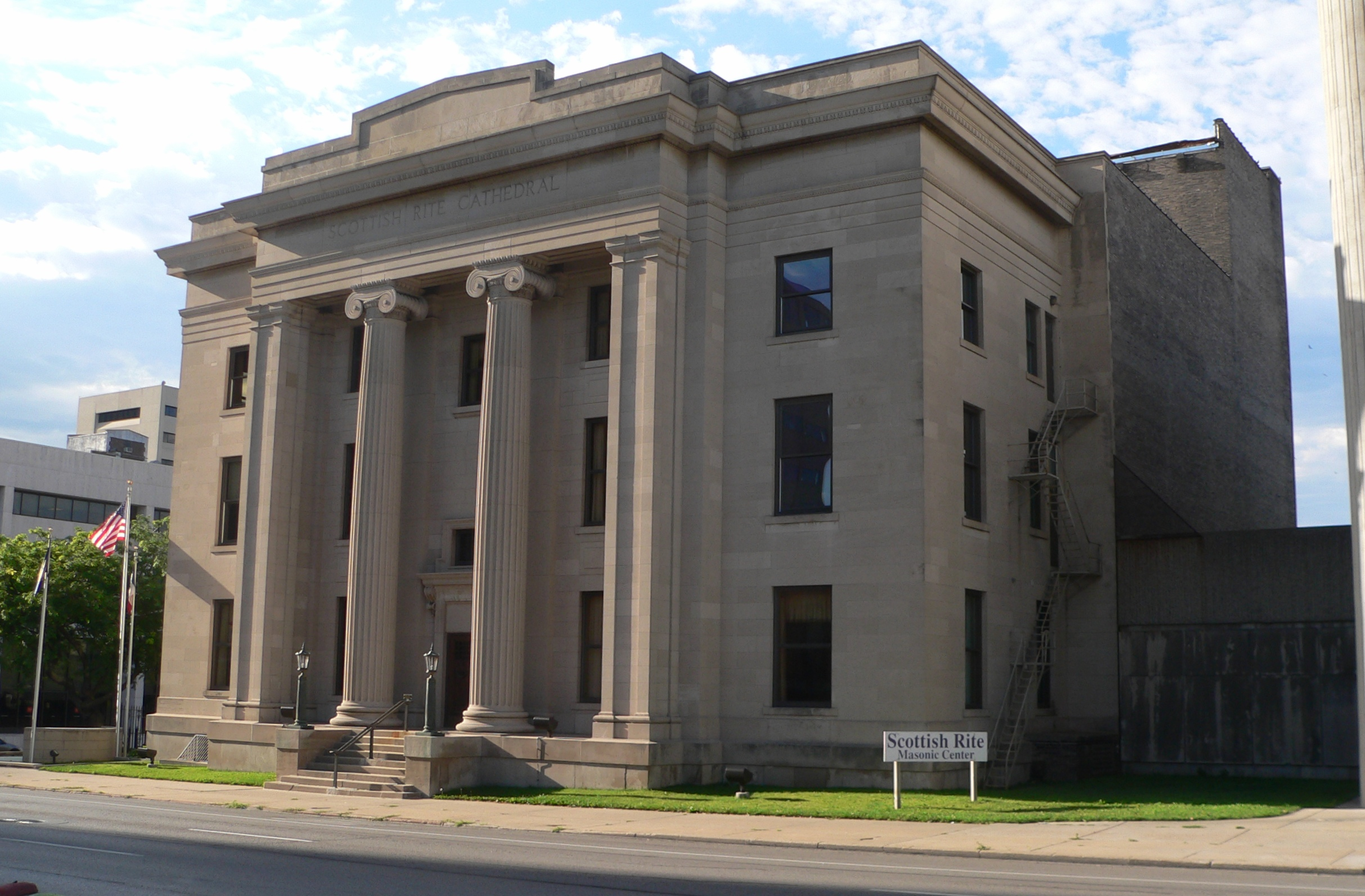
Scottish Rite Cathedral, Omaha, Nebraska

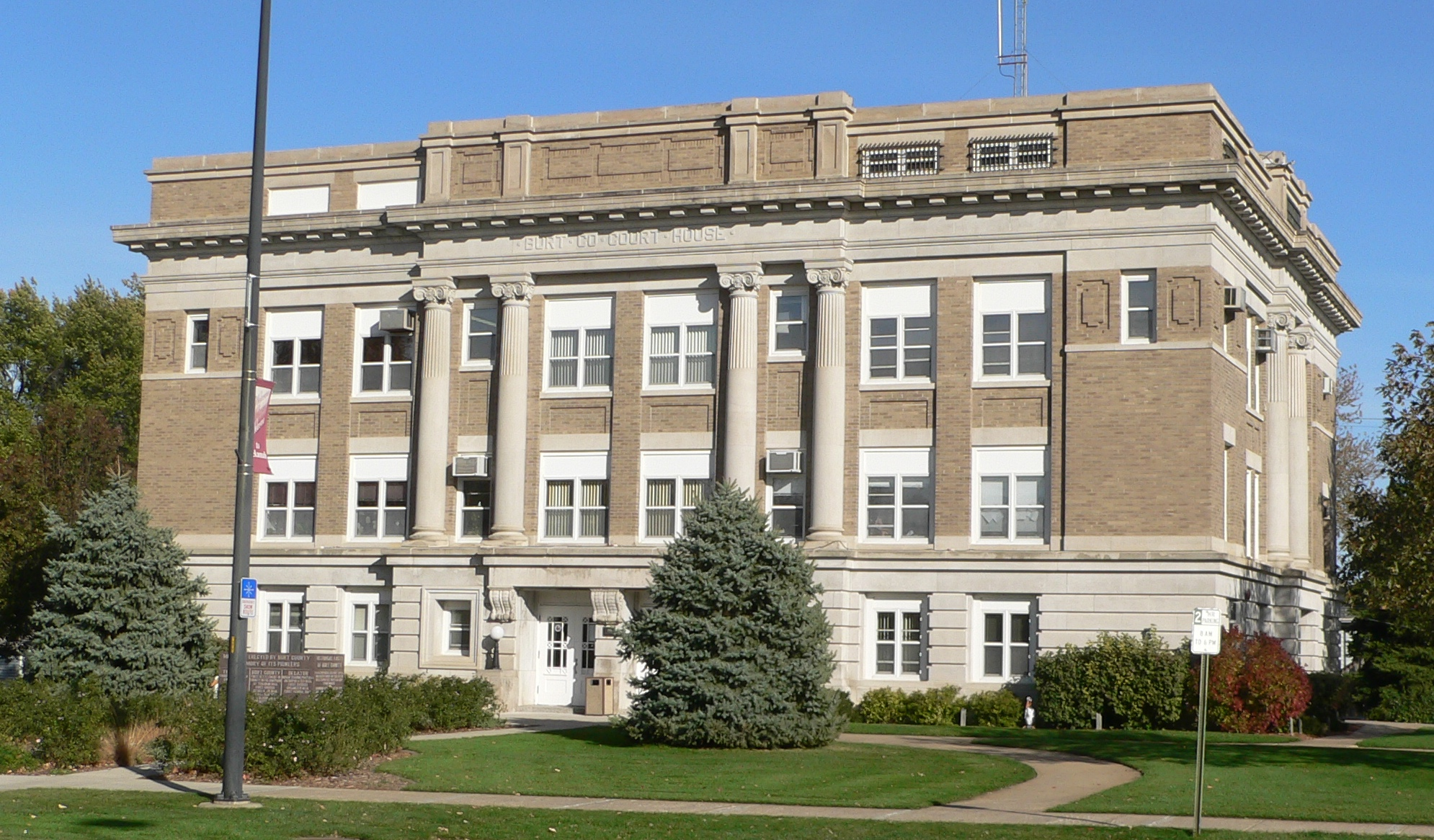
Burt County, Nebraska Courthouse

- Original Methodist Hospital, built in 1906 at 36th and Cuming Streets in Omaha, Nebraska. The architect was Thomas Rogers Kimball. The original contract for the building was granted to Rocheford & Gould in 1903, but financing problems delayed the construction until after Rocheford & Gould had dissolved. When work resumed, the contract was fulfilled by F. P. Gould & Son. It has been demolished.
- Burwood Theater, built in 1906 in Omaha, Nebraska. In 1908 it was renamed as The Gayety Theater. It has been demolished.
- Hotel Loyal, built in 1907 at 211 North 16th Street in Omaha, Nebraska. It has been demolished.
- Rosewater School, built in 1910 in Omaha, Nebraska, it is now referred to as Rosewater Apartments. The building was named an Omaha Landmark on September 18, 1984, and added to the National Register of Historic Places in 1985.
- First Church of Christ Scientist, built in 1910 at 24th and St. Mary's Avenue in Omaha, Nebraska, next to the Mary Rogers Kimball House. The building is still in use as a church.
- The Odd Fellows' Home, built in 1910 in York, Nebraska.
- Scottish Rite Cathedral, built in 1912 at 2001 Douglas Street in Omaha, Nebraska. The building is still in use by the Scottish Rite. In 2011 it was added to the National Register of Historic Places.
- Miller Park Elementary School, built in 1912 in Omaha, Nebraska. The original school was replaced by a new structure in 1928.
- Burt County Courthouse, built 1916 in Tekamah, Nebraska. The building is still in use.
- Boyle's College at 1805 Harney Street in Omaha, Nebraska.

== See also ==
- Architecture in Omaha, Nebraska
- Arthur G. Rocheford Building
