= El Museo Latino =

- The Polish Home
- U.S. National Register of Historic Places
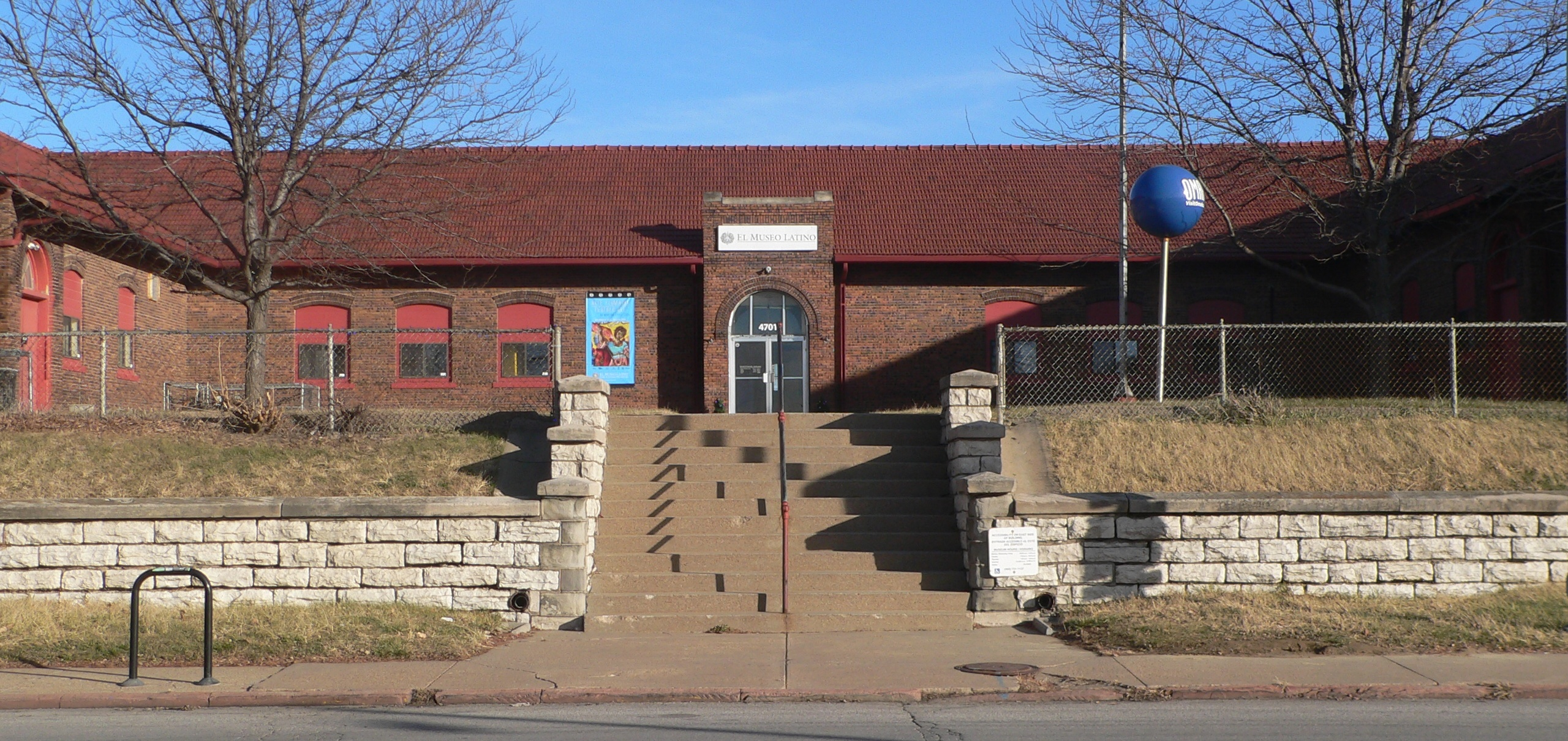
- View from 25th Street

- Location within Nebraska
- Location: 4701 S. 25th Street, Omaha, Nebraska
- Coordinates: 41.211921°N 95.94815°W
- Built: 1916
- Architectural style: Romanesque Revival
- NRHP reference No.: 15000793
- Added to NRHP: November 16, 2015

El Museo Latino is a museum featuring Latino and Hispanic art and history that is located at 4701 South 25th Street in South Omaha, Nebraska. Established in 1993, by Magdalena García, it is the first Latino art and history museum and cultural center in the Midwest.

== History ==
El Museo Latino was established by Magdalena Garcia, a Mexico City native who had moved to Omaha at the age of nine. After working in industry for some years, Garcia had changed her focus to art and museums. In 1988, she obtained a degree in fine arts from the University of Nebraska Omaha; in 1992, a master's degree in museum management from Syracuse University. She returned to Omaha and, in 1993, opened El Museo Latino in the Livestock Exchange Building.

In 1997, the museum moved to the former Polish Home, at 4701 S. 25th Street. The site had originally been occupied by the South Central School, built in 1887. In 1916, the school was essentially rebuilt, as a single-story U-shaped Romanesque Revival-style building. In 1930, following the school's closing, the building was acquired by the American Legion. The Legion found themselves unable to keep up with the mortgage payments, and in 1936 sold the building to the Polish Home, a social organization serving the large Polish immigrant community in South Omaha. As the Polish Home, the building housed a library and served as a venue for Polish-language classes and for events such as dances, wedding receptions, and political rallies. The Polish Home owned the building until 1998, when it was sold to El Museo Latino.

== About ==
El Museo Latino features exhibits about Latino and Hispanic art and history. Educational programs for kindergarten through twelfth grade, post-secondary, and adult audiences at the museum include lectures, slide presentations, films, art classes, workshops, demonstrations, art history classes, gallery talks, guided visits, and dance classes. Additionally, El Museo Latino is a resource center for Latino studies in the Midwest. Museum highlights have included an exhibit from the Smithsonian Institution organized by actor Edward James Olmos , along with works by Diego Rivera and Frida Kahlo. Photographer David Bacon and painter Terry Rosenberg have also been featured.

El Museo Latino organizes special events highlighting Cinco de Mayo, including an annual almuerzo, or brunch. Hispanic Heritage Month in September features a banquet. During the year, Family Day celebrations are also scheduled as well as special dance performances by the museum's dance company, "CHOMARI" Ballet Folklorico Mexicano, and by visiting artists. The museum also coordinates an annual celebration for El Día de Muertos, including a festival, special exhibits and cultural celebrations.

In 2015, the museum's building was listed in the National Register of Historic Places, under the name "Polish Home".

== See also ==
- Mexicans in Omaha, Nebraska
