= El Latino =

El Latino may refer to:

- El Tiempo Latino (formerly El Latino), Washington, D.C.
- El Museo Latino, Omaha, Nebraska
