= Packer's National Bank Building =

- Packer's National Bank
- U.S. National Register of Historic Places
- Omaha Landmark
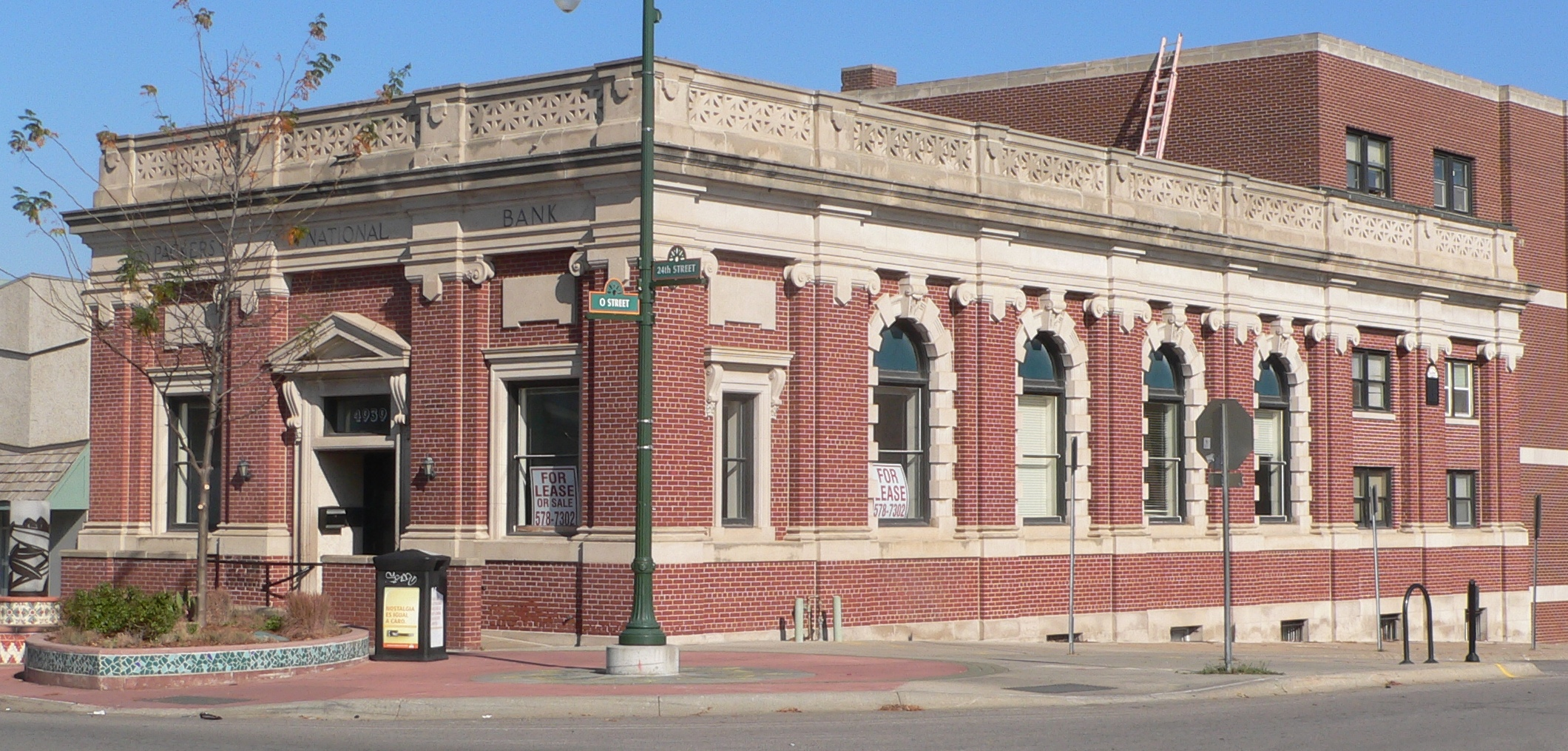
- Packers National Bank, seen across the corner of 24th and O Streets

- Location within Nebraska Location within the United States
- Location: 4939 S. 24th St., Omaha, Nebraska
- Coordinates: 41°12′30.5″N 95°56′48.4″W
- Area: <1 acre (4,000 m^{2})
- Built: 1907
- Architect: Kimball, Thomas Rogers
- Architectural style: Second Renaissance Revival
- NRHP reference No.: 85001071

Significant dates
- Added to NRHP: May 16, 1985
- Designated OMAL: September 18, 1984

Packer's National Bank Building is located at 4939 South 24th Street in the South Omaha Main Street Historic District in south Omaha, Nebraska. It was built in 1907. In 1984, it was designated an Omaha Landmark and, in 1985, it was listed on the National Register of Historic Places.

== About ==
Designed by Thomas Kimball in the Second Renaissance Revival Style, the Packer's National Bank Building was the home of Packer’s National Bank. The bank was originally established in 1891, and its growth was closely tied to the Omaha Stockyards. Many of the bank’s early officers were executives in Omaha's meat packing industry. The bank left the building in 1979 and, in 1984, the building was renovated for use as offices and apartments.

== See also ==
- Vinton Street Commercial Historic District
