= South Omaha City Hall =

Coordinates: 41°12′29″N 95°56′51″W

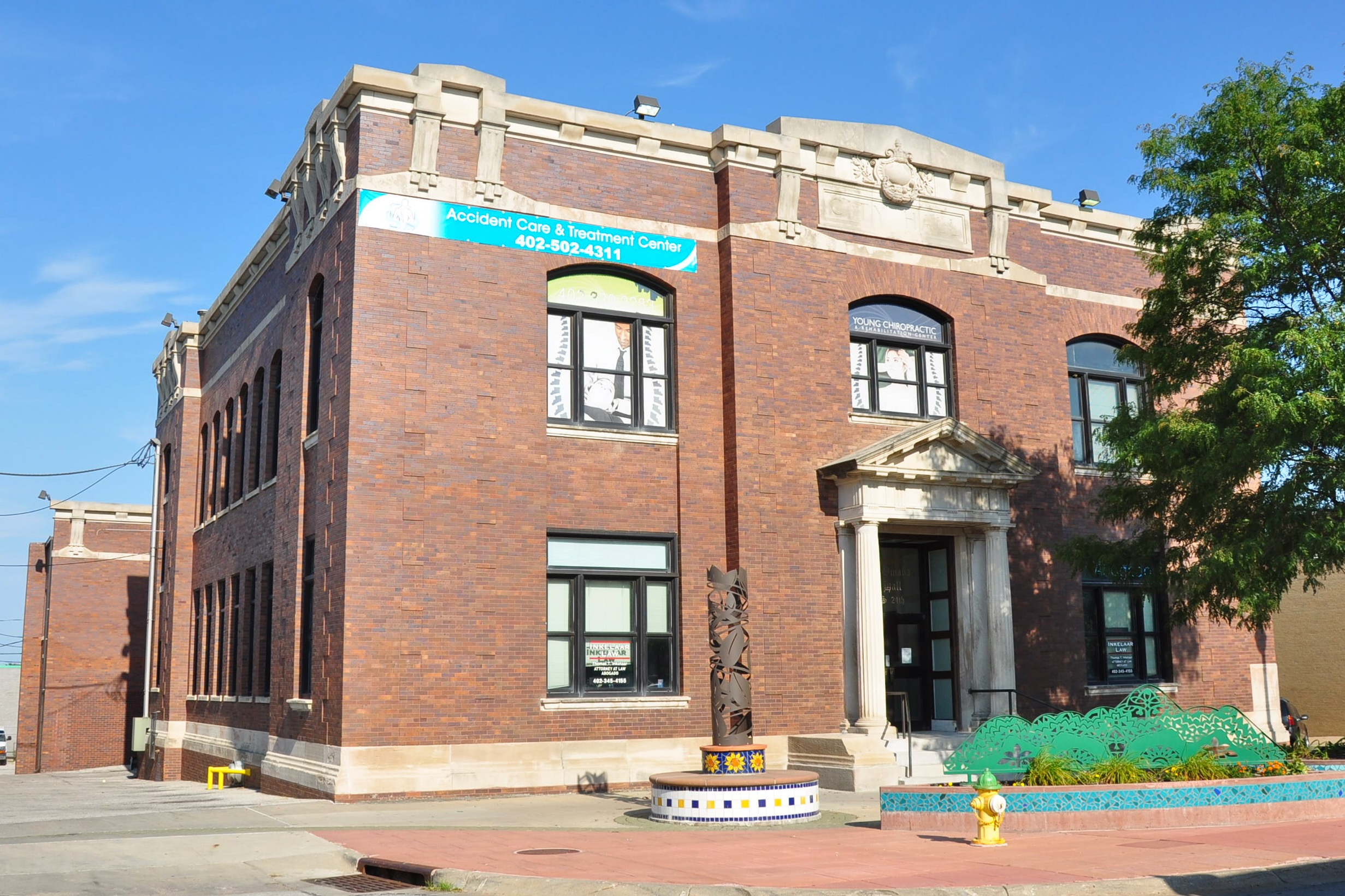
- Interactive map of the South Omaha City Hall area

General information
- Location: Omaha, Nebraska, United States
- Construction started: 1917
- Completed: 1917

The South Omaha City Hall is part of the South Omaha Main Street Historic District located at 5002 South 24th Street in the South Omaha neighborhood of Omaha, Nebraska. It was designed by notable local architect John Latenser, Sr.

== History ==
Built in the 1890s at the cost of $50,000,

When South Omaha merged with the City of Omaha in 1915, the merger called for specific and numerated services to be continued to the community as a part of the merger agreement. City Hall was rehabilitated in the late 1980s in honor of the merger agreement, and the building continued to house driver licensing and testing, courts and police facilities. The City stopped services in the 1990s, and sold the building for commercial purposes.

== See also ==
- History of Omaha, Nebraska
