= Arthur G. Rocheford Building =

- U.S. National Register of Historic Places
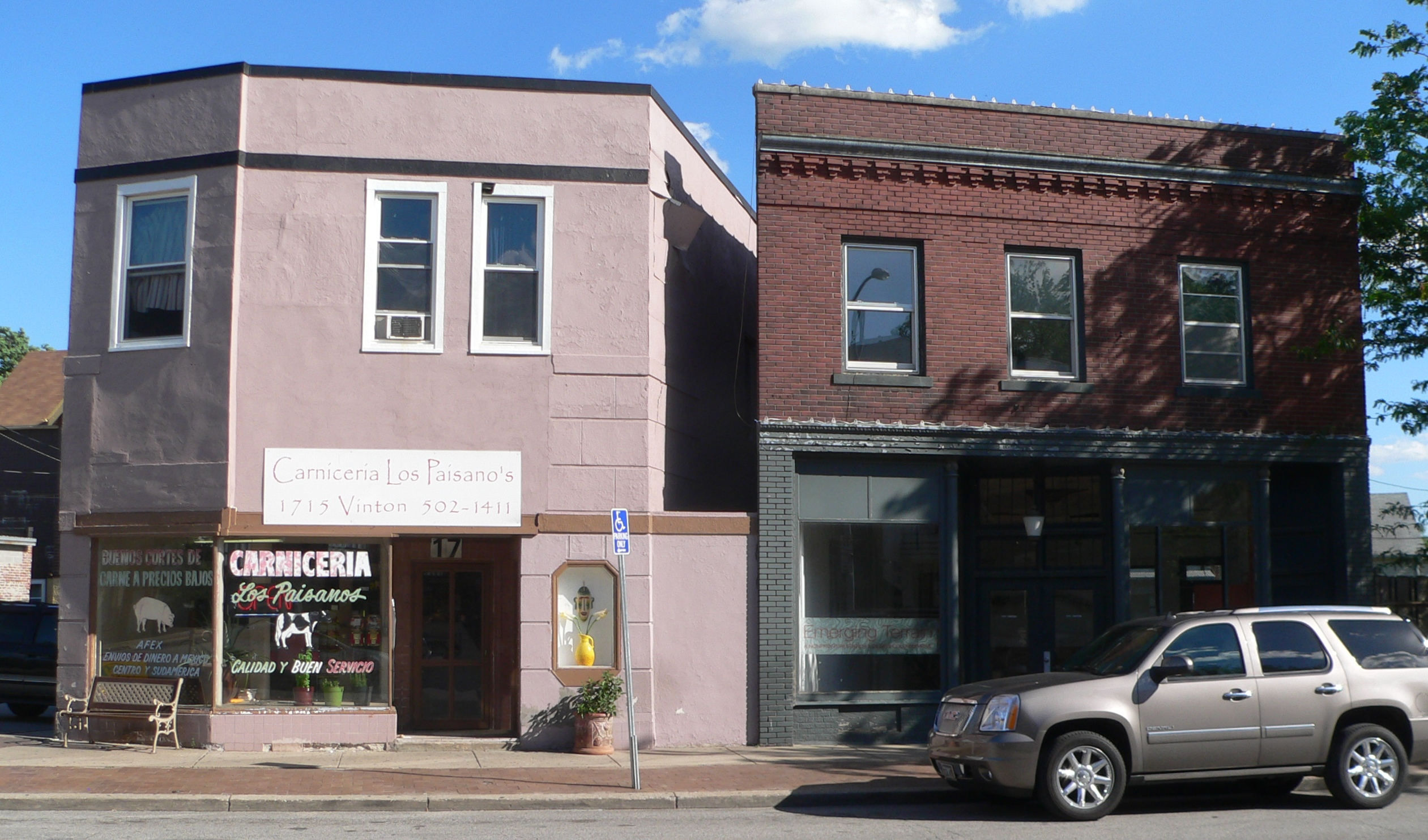
- Arthur G. Rocheford Building on right

- Location within Nebraska Location within the United States
- Location: 1717 Vinton Street, Omaha, Nebraska
- Coordinates: 41°14′44.74″N 95°56′8.84″W
- Built: 1913
- NRHP reference No.: 06000608
- Added to NRHP: July 11, 2006

The Arthur G. Rocheford Building is a historic commercial building at 1717 Vinton Street in South Omaha, Nebraska, United States. The building was built in 1913 to house Arthur G. Rocheford's Globe Plumbing Company. Rocheford served as the general contractor during construction of the building. The building was added to the National Register of Historic Places in 2006 as part of the admission of the Vinton Street Commercial Historic District.

== History ==
Arthur G. Rocheford was the son of William M. Rocheford, co-owner of the brickmaking and general contracting firm of Rocheford & Gould. The company's brickyard operation was located at Thirteenth and Frederick Streets, and the family's large red brick home was at 2423 South 18th Street. The location Arthur Rocheford chose for his plumbing business was within walking distance of both locations. Although Rocheford & Gould dissolved in 1906, William Rocheford continued his construction business with his sons, building family rental properties and a select number of larger projects. Coming from such a construction-oriented family, it is no surprise that Arthur would choose to act as the general contractor during the construction of his own building.

The Arthur G. Rocheford Building is built of red brick in the Italianate style. It retains its first floor cast-iron columns with inset double entryway with transom windows overhead. The building was built with a small tin cornice with corbelled brickwork and a raised stringer course. Interior details include oak flooring and a pressed tin ceiling on the main level.

In addition to housing Arthur G. Rocheford's plumbing business, the building has also been home over the years to a jeweler, a mail order business, a shoemaker, a dry cleaner, a painting business and a carpet dealer. The building was the headquarters of Emerging Terrain, a nonprofit organization devoted to community development and creatively informing civic and urban planning, but the organization sold the building in April 2014. The building is currently the home to DeOld Andersen Architecture, an emerging architecture and urban design practice originally founded in New York City.

== See also ==
- History of Omaha
- Vinton Street Commercial Historic District
- Elsasser Bakery
