= Hanscom Park United Methodist Church =

Methodist church in Omaha, Nebraska

- Hanscom Park United Methodist Church
- Hanscom Park United Methodist Church
- 41°14′25″N 95°58′46″W
- Location: Omaha, NE
- Country: United States
- Denomination: United Methodist Church
- Website: www.hanscomparkchurch.org

History
- Founded: 1886

Hanscom Park United Methodist Church is located at 4444 Frances Street in the Hanscom Park neighborhood of Omaha, Nebraska. Established in 1886, the congregation has long been a leader in Nebraska Conference of the United Methodist Church, and hosted at least one annual regional meeting. In 1953, the congregation's pastor gained national attention for forming a psychiatric support group for Methodist ministers.

== History ==
Hanscom Park Methodist Episcopal Church was organized in 1886 by H. H. Millard. Built in what was considered to be an upscale community, the church sat in the middle of a field. By 1904 the congregation boasted a membership of 352. Early pastors that succeeded H. H. Millard were George M. Brown, J. P. Murray, F. M. Sisson, and Clyde C. Cissel.

Around the turn of the century the Hanscom Park congregation became concerned with the "lawlessness and destitute behavior" of workers from the nearby Union Stockyards in South Omaha. They organized dances to compete with the "loose establishments" in Sheelytown, a tenement located to the east. These gatherings routinely caused a stir among local residents, but were continuously held for many years. In 1899 the North Nebraska Conference annual meeting was held at Hanscom Park.

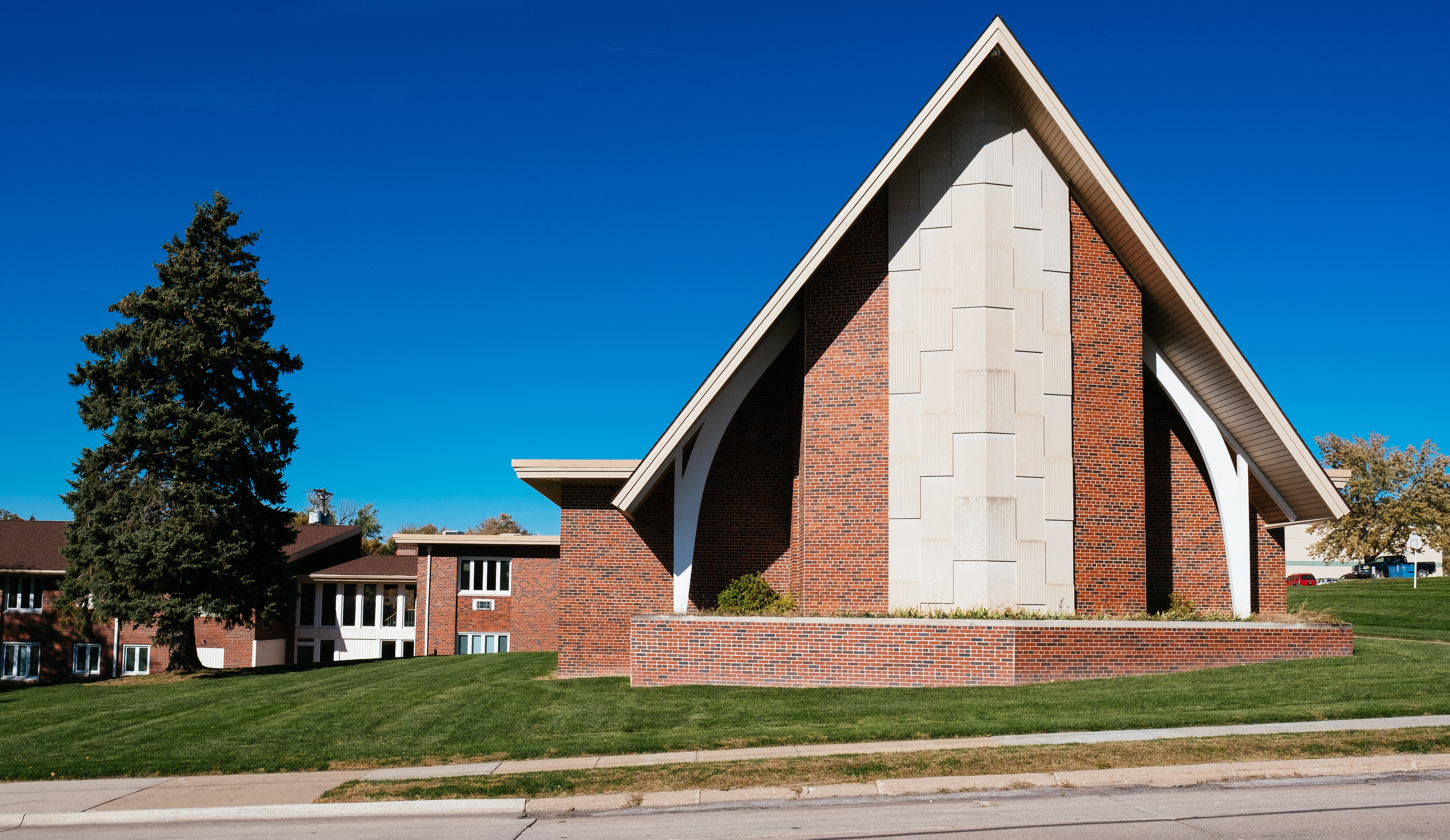

In 1953, Hanscom Park pastor Reverend Ben Wallace helped found the Ministers' Clinic of Nebraska, a discussion group for mostly Methodist ministers to talk about their anxieties and understandings in relationship to those of professional psychiatrists. The group received national news coverage, including an article in Time magazine.

== Currently ==
In 2006 white supremacists blanketed a number of Omaha neighborhoods with pamphlets. In response, Hanscom Park U.M.C. held a town hall-style meeting to discuss the matter. The executive director of the regional Anti-Defamation League in Omaha spoke to local citizens during the meeting. In 2007 the church hosted a special dinner for Nebraskans for Peace. The evening included a presentation by Frank Cordaro of the Phil Berrigan Catholic Worker House in Des Moines, Iowa.

== See also ==
- South Omaha
- Field Club
- List of churches in Omaha, Nebraska
