= Vinton Street Commercial Historic District =

Historic district in Nebraska, United States

Coordinates: 41°13′59″N 95°56′26″W

- U.S. National Register of Historic Places
- U.S. Historic district
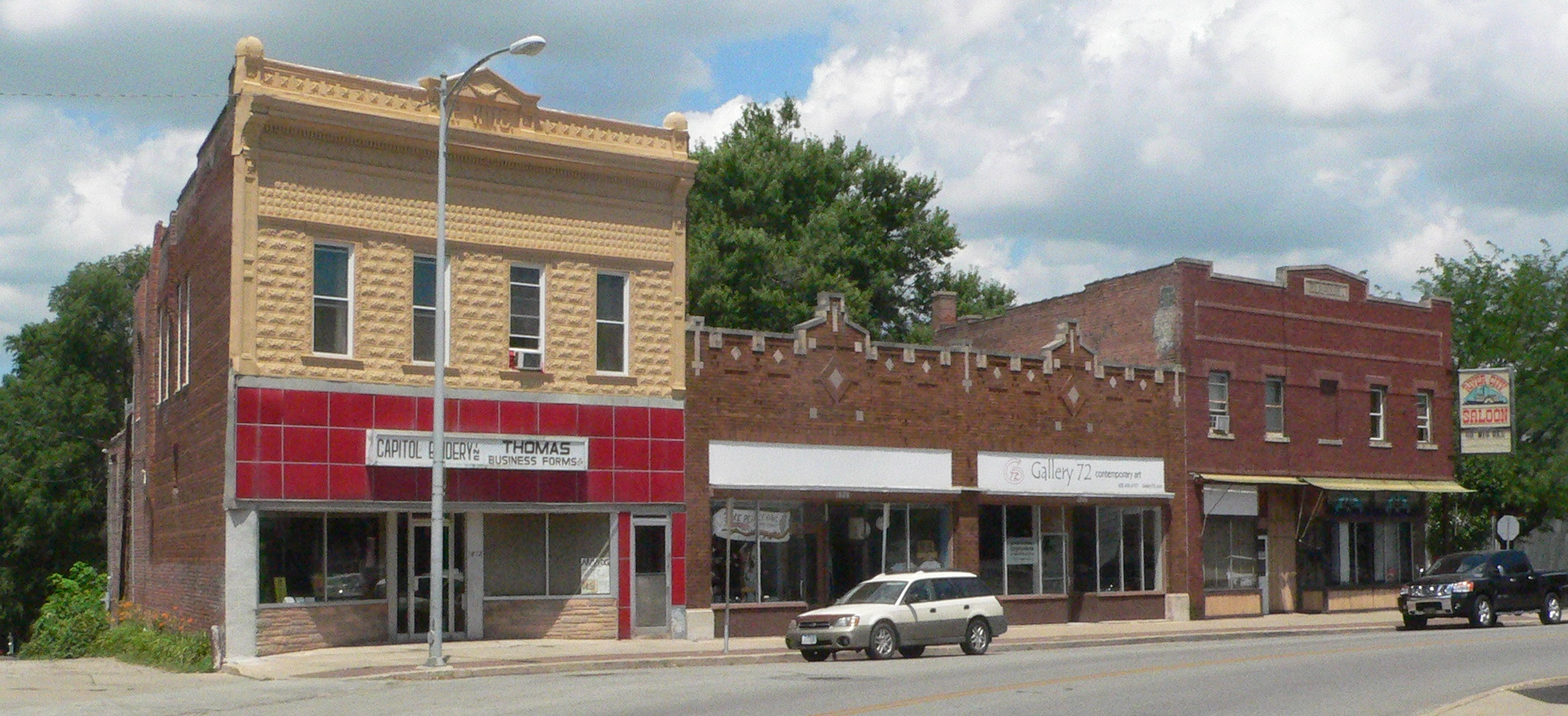
- Buildings on northwest side of Vinton Street. From left to right are the two-story Peter Wiig building at 1810-1812 Vinton; the one-story C. B. Schleicher building at 1806-1808 Vinton; and the two-story William L. Elsasser Bakery building at 1802-1804 Vinton.

- Location within Nebraska Location within the United States
- Location: Omaha, Nebraska
- Architectural style: Italianate, Colonial Revival
- NRHP reference No.: 06000608
- Added to NRHP: July 11, 2006

The Vinton Street Commercial Historic District is located along Vinton Street between Elm Street on the west and South 17th Street on the east in south Omaha, Nebraska. This district is located adjacent to Sheelytown, a residential neighborhood that had historically significant populations of Irish, Poles, and Eastern European immigrants. It grew along with the success of the Union Stockyards and South Omaha. It was added to the National Register of Historic Places in 2006.

== See also ==
- History of Omaha
- Elsasser Bakery
- Arthur G. Rocheford Building
