= Poles in Omaha, Nebraska =

Polish community in Omaha

Poles in Omaha, Nebraska arrived relatively early in the city's history. The first Polish immigrants came in the 1870s, and the community grew past 1000 in the late 1890s. By the 1930s there were 10,000 of Polish descent, and Omaha claimed the largest such community of the Great Plains. According to the 2000 United States census, Omaha had a total population of 390,112 residents, of whom 18,447 claimed Polish ancestry. The city's Polish community was historically based in several ethnic enclaves throughout South Omaha, including Little Poland and Sheelytown, first dominated by Irish immigrants.

== History ==
Poles have had a presence in Omaha since the late 1870s, when they started arriving to work in the meatpacking, stockyards, smelting and railroad industries. More arrived in the 1880s, but most after 1900. The state of Nebraska, and Omaha in particular, was advertised heavily in Poland as a destination for jobs starting in 1877 by the Chicago-based Polish Roman Catholic Union of America and the Burlington and Missouri River Railroad. Ralph Modjeski, a Polish-American civil engineer, helped build the Union Pacific Missouri River Bridge in Omaha in 1872.

Poles continued to immigrate to Omaha, with most coming in the early 20th century, before immigration was reduced by World War I and new laws in 1923. By the 1930s South Omaha counted more than 10,000 Polish residents. As with other early 20th-century European immigrants, their industrial jobs contrasted with their traditional farming and rural pasts. Many were employed by the Omaha Stockyards and the meatpacking plants throughout the area. Numerous Polish immigrants lived in the Burlington Road neighborhood Sheelytown, and the city's "Little Poland". This neighborhood extended west from South 25th to South 29th, F Street south to L Street. It eventually extended west to South 45th Street, earning the name Golden Hill.

About 1895, only two hundred Polish families lived in Omaha. With close-knit ties to their families, the Polish community was Roman Catholic. As their numbers grew, the immigrants and descendants supported three ethnic Polish parishes in the city. Few spoke English well, and few were skilled laborers. Their social lives revolved around a number of heritage societies. They included the Polish Roman Catholic Union, the Polish Union of the United States, the National Alliance, the Pulaski Club, the Polish Welfare Club and the Polish Citizens' Club.

Neighboring enclaves included concentrations of other immigrants, such as Little Bohemia and Greektown, as well as a Jewish neighborhood. Immigrants tended to settle together where they were linked by language, culture and religion. Nellie Tayloe Ross, the first woman to serve as governor of an American State, taught at a school in one of Omaha's Polish neighborhoods in the late 1890s.

=== St. Paul's incident ===
In 1891 several Polish families constructed a Roman Catholic church at South 29th and Elm Streets in the Sheelytown neighborhood. That year Father T. Jakimowicz arrived from Elba, Nebraska, but left after a few years because of "misunderstandings" with the congregation. Dissidents within the congregation put forward Stephen Kaminski, a Polish nationalist and Franciscan friar, as their priest. The bishop did not agree with this choice (and at that time, parishioners did not have the right to choose). Those who supported Kaminski held title to the building and its land. The courts ruled on March 27, 1895, that the Roman Catholic bishop (or diocese) legally owned the church and land. Before the dispute was resolved, supporters took sides and burned down the church. The diocese reorganized the parish afterwards, distributing residents among other churches, including the Immaculate Conception Church, which remains a congregation of primarily parishioners of Polish descent.

== 20th century ==
Around the turn of the century, members of the Hanscom Park Methodist Episcopal Church became concerned with the "lawlessness and destitute behavior" of Poles living in Sheelytown. They organized dances to compete with the "loose establishments" in the area. These caused a stir among local residents and were held for many years.

The Western Star was a Polish language newspaper published in Omaha from 1904 to 1945. During the 1920s, Polish neighborhoods in Omaha produced many successful amateur baseball teams. A statue was placed in honor of Poles from the Omaha area who fought with the Blue Army during World War I at St. John's Cemetery in the suburb of Bellevue. In the 1950s, a study of the city noted that "nearly all the Poles live in this area [South Omaha]", and that the neighborhoods were "the most segregated and congested of all the districts in Omaha."

Immigration was slowed by the World Wars and changes in US immigration law in 1923, which decreased the numbers arriving from Central Europe. After WWII, Communist rule in Poland cut off immigration. Few new Polish immigrants arrived until the reduction of the Soviet Union's influence and the Solidarity-era in Poland.

== Present ==
As ethnic Polish descendants assimilated and moved to the suburbs, their old neighborhoods were filled by new immigrants, chiefly Mexican immigrants and other Latinos. They also work in the meatpacking industry.

The Immigration History Research Center Archives, University of Minnesota Libraries, holds the Omaha Photograph Collection records. The collection includes numerous photos of Little Poland and Poles in Omaha.

== Notable Polish-Americans from Omaha ==
- Lieutenant General Leo J. Dulacki was born December 29, 1918, in Omaha. After serving in the United States Marine Corps for 32 years, he retired in 1974 and was inducted into the Attache Hall of Fame of the Defense Intelligence Agency in 1990.
- Bernard Kolasa was a political scientist at the University of Nebraska at Omaha and member of the Omaha Public Schools School Board who taught for 32 years. He was respected nationally for his contributions to the field, and for his advocacy for Omaha's Polish community.
- John Synowiecki is a Nebraska state senator from Omaha and the program director for governmental relations for Catholic Charities.
- Michael Zagurski is a baseball pitcher for the Philadelphia Phillies who was born January 27, 1983, in Omaha.

== See also ==
- History of Omaha

== Bibliography ==
- Allen, D. (1993) "Polish Americans and Ethnic Identity in Foreign Policy." Paper delivered at the Missouri Valley History Conference in Omaha, Nebraska in March.
- Thernstrom, S. (ed) (1991) Harvard Encyclopedia of American Ethnic Groups. Cambridge: Harvard University Press, Belknap Press.
- Lehman, J. (ed) (2000) Gale Encyclopedia of Multicultural America, 2nd edition. New York: Gale Group.
- Fox, P. (1978) Poles in America. New York: Arno Press.
- Morawska, F. (1973) The Poles in America, 1608-1972: A Chronology and Fact Book. Dobbs Ferry, NY: Oceana Publications, Inc.
- Ember, M., Ember, C.R., Skoggard, I. (2005) Encyclopedia of Diasporas: Immigrant and Refugee Cultures Around the World. Springer US.
