= Mason School =

United States historical place

- U.S. National Register of Historic Places
- Omaha Landmark
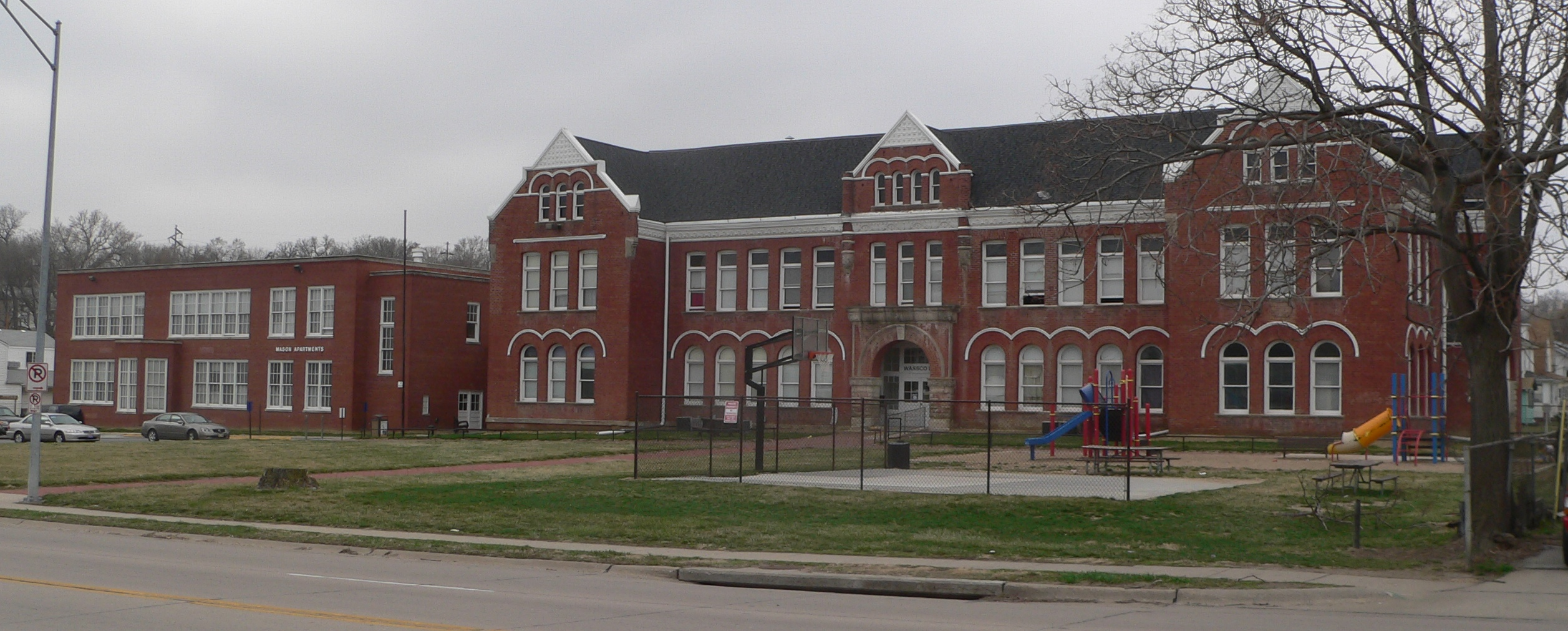
- Mason School, seen from 24th Street

- Location within Nebraska Location within the United States
- Interactive map showing the location of Mason School
- Location: 1012 South 24th Street, Omaha, Nebraska
- Coordinates: 41°15′01″N 95°56′52″W
- Built: 1888
- Architect: Mendelssohn, Fisher and Lawrie
- Architectural style: Richardson Romanesque
- NRHP reference No.: 86000339

Significant dates
- Added to NRHP: March 13, 1986
- Designated OMAL: January 28, 1986

Mason School is located at 1012 South 24th Street in south Omaha, Nebraska, United States. Designed in the Richardson Romanesque style by the architectural firm of Mendelssohn, Fisher and Lawrie, the school was built in 1888 by the brick manufacturing and construction firm of Hadden, Rocheford & Gould. The school closed in the late 1970s and was converted into apartments. It was designated an Omaha Landmark in 1986 and listed on the National Register of Historic Places that same year.

== About ==
Mason School is a two-story brick building named in honor of Charles Mason, a Nebraska Supreme Court Justice in the early years of the state.

When the school was built in 1888, it was located on the western fringe of Omaha on an unpaved South 24th Street. At the time it was opened, it was the largest elementary school in Omaha, with sixteen classrooms. The first principal was Jennie McKoons, with a staff of five teachers. When it first opened the school had 326 students; however, within a few years it expanded so rapidly that three wooden additions had to be constructed to accommodate the student body. They were replaced in 1936 with a brick addition.

In 1989 the building was renovated and turned into apartments.

Industrialist and philanthropist Peter Kiewit was among the school's notable students.

== See also ==
- History of Omaha
