= Elsasser Bakery =

- U.S. National Register of Historic Places
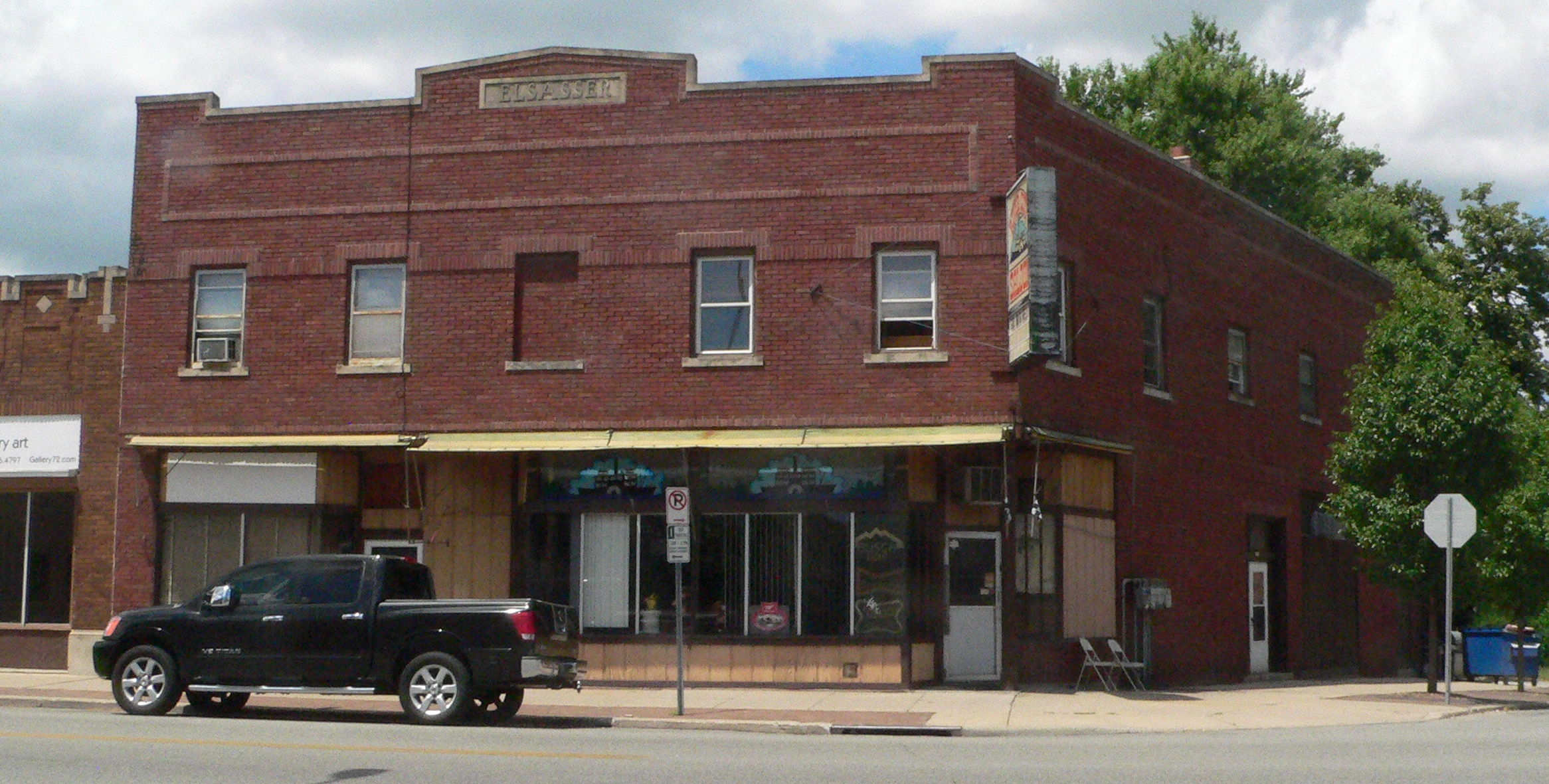
- William L. Elsasser Bakery Building

- Location within Nebraska Location within the United States
- Location: 1802-1804 Vinton Street, Omaha, Nebraska
- Coordinates: 41°14′44.74″N 95°56′8.84″W
- Built: 1923
- NRHP reference No.: 06000608
- Added to NRHP: July 11, 2006

The Elsasser Bakery is a building at 1802 and 1804 Vinton Street in South Omaha, Nebraska, USA. The building was constructed in 1923 for the William L. Elsasser Bakery. The Elsasser name is carved into a stone panel at the top of the red brick building. The building was added to the National Register of Historic Places in 2006 as part of the admission of the Vinton Street Commercial Historic District. The building's main occupant is currently the River City Saloon.

== History ==
The Elsasser family were bakers from the town of Vaihingen in Württemberg, Germany. After arriving in Omaha in the early 1880s, the family patriarch, Christian G. Elsasser, opened the first Elsasser family bakery at 709 Leavenworth Street. The bakery was appropriately named The Leavenworth Street Bakery and appears in the 1883 Wolfe's Omaha City Directory. In 1887, Christian's son, William Ludwig Elsasser, established the W. L. Elsasser Bakery at 2014 South 19th Street. Around the late 1890s, William moved the bakery to 2416 South 19th Street. In 1904, the bakery operation was moved to its final location at 1802 Vinton Street. At the time, the building was a wood-frame structure previously occupied by another bakery. William Elsasser's family conveniently moved to a two-story home behind the bakery at 2706 South 18th Street.

When William L. Elsasser died unexpectedly on July 27, 1914, his widow, Susanna, continued to run the bakery with the assistance of other family members. Under her direction in 1923 the current brick building was built. The general contractor was Frederick W. Rice, a relative of the family. After Susanna Elsasser died in 1926, her sons William J. and Carl L. Elsasser took over bakery operations. Their' running of the bakery was relatively short-lived. The last listing for the bakery in the city directories was 1931. By 1940, the bakery had been converted to a bar. Currently, the main occupant of the building is the River City Saloon.

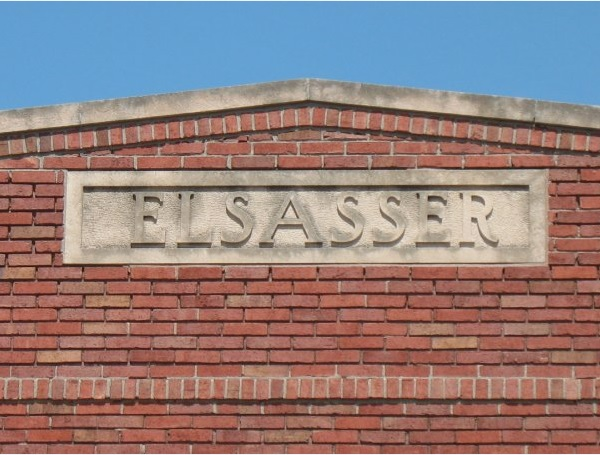
Elsasser Bakery Stone Panel

The Elsasser Bakery building is a two-story red brick commercial vernacular building. In addition to the Elsasser name carved into a stone panel at the top of the building, other decorative aspects of the building include a stone-capped parapet roof, brick banding, window hoods and stone sills. The center window on the second story is bricked in. When the Elsasser Bakery was in operation there was a large front awning imprinted with "1802 Elsasser's Bakery".

The Elsasser Bakery was a neighborhood bakery serving the residents surrounding it. The bakery's specialties were Vienna and German rye bread. During a Food Administration hearing on the price of bread, Elsasser's Bakery reported total sales in December 1917 of $2,140, with the retail price of a loaf of bread set at 9 cents. The value of the plant and the equipment was estimated at $2,500.

The Elsasser family was known throughout Omaha for its large, annual family reunions. The first was held on November 1, 1913, across the street from the bakery at Miller's Hall at 1724 Vinton Street.

A stained glass window as a memorial to William L. Elsasser was installed by the Elsasser family on the south wall of the sanctuary of Cross Lutheran Church at 3101 South 20th Street.

== Gallery ==
Elsasser Bakery, 2416 South 19th Street

Baking bread in the basement of the Elsasser Bakery

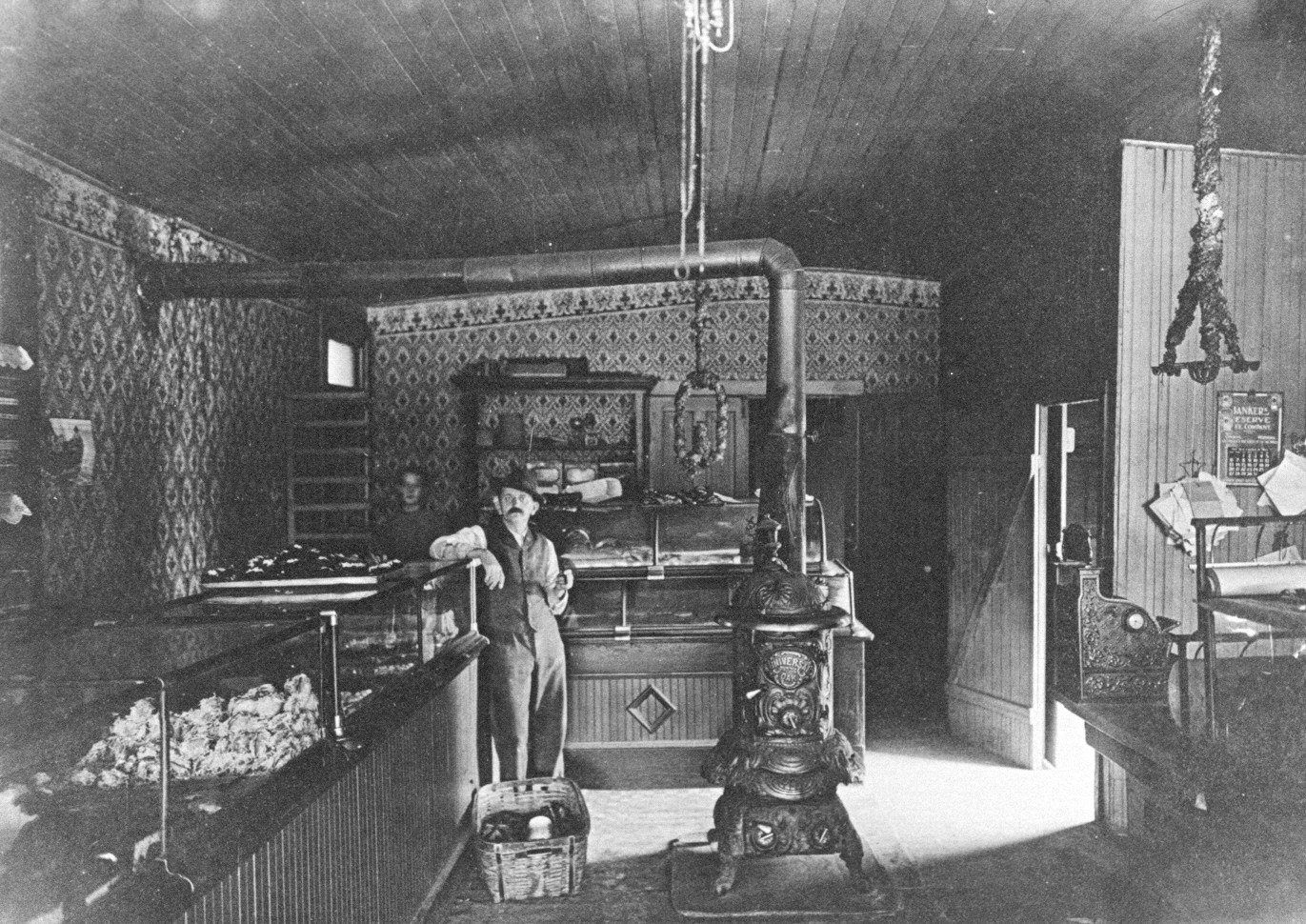
William Elsasser inside his 1802 Vinton Street bakery

Elsasser Bakery truck

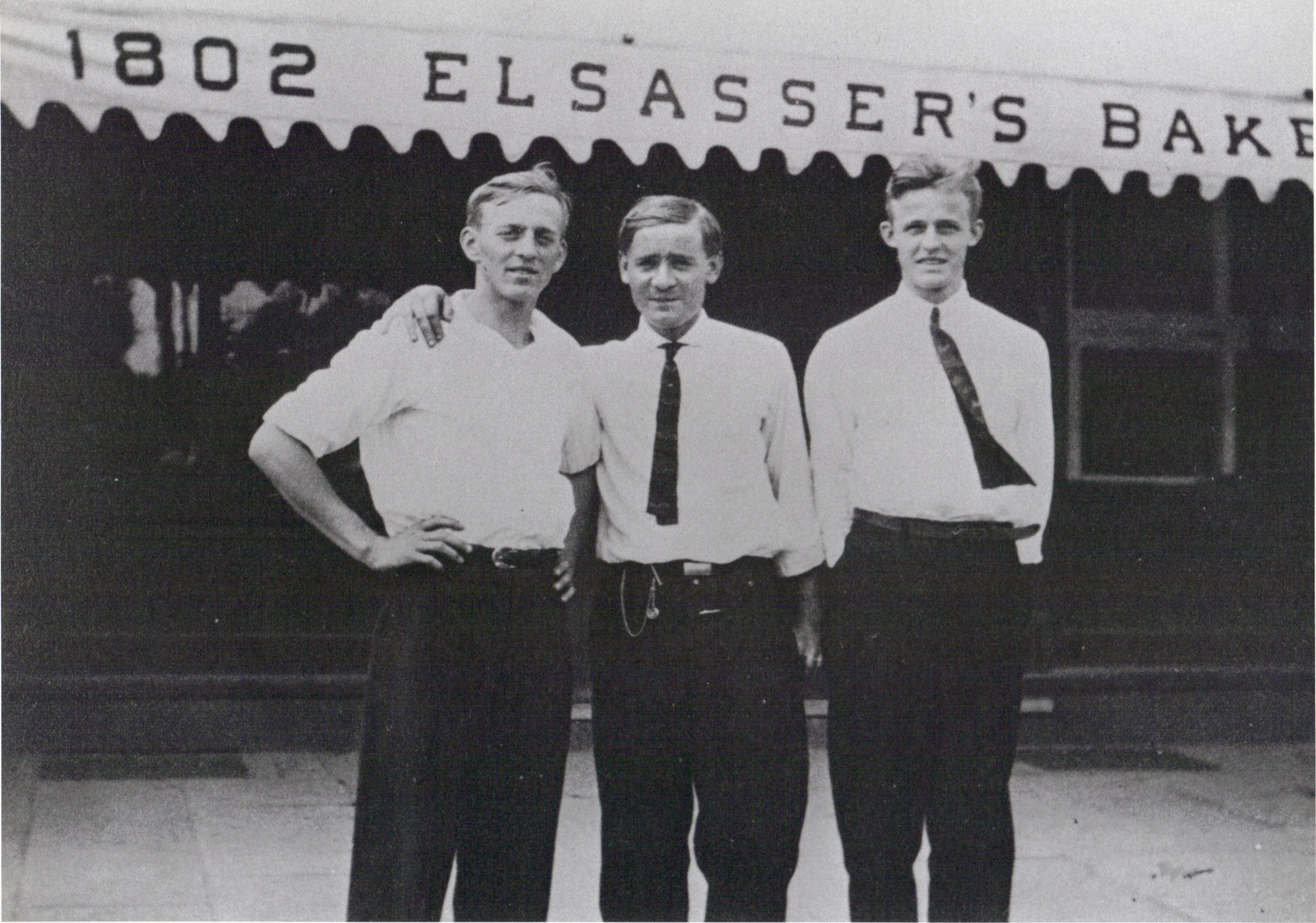
Elsasser Bakery awning

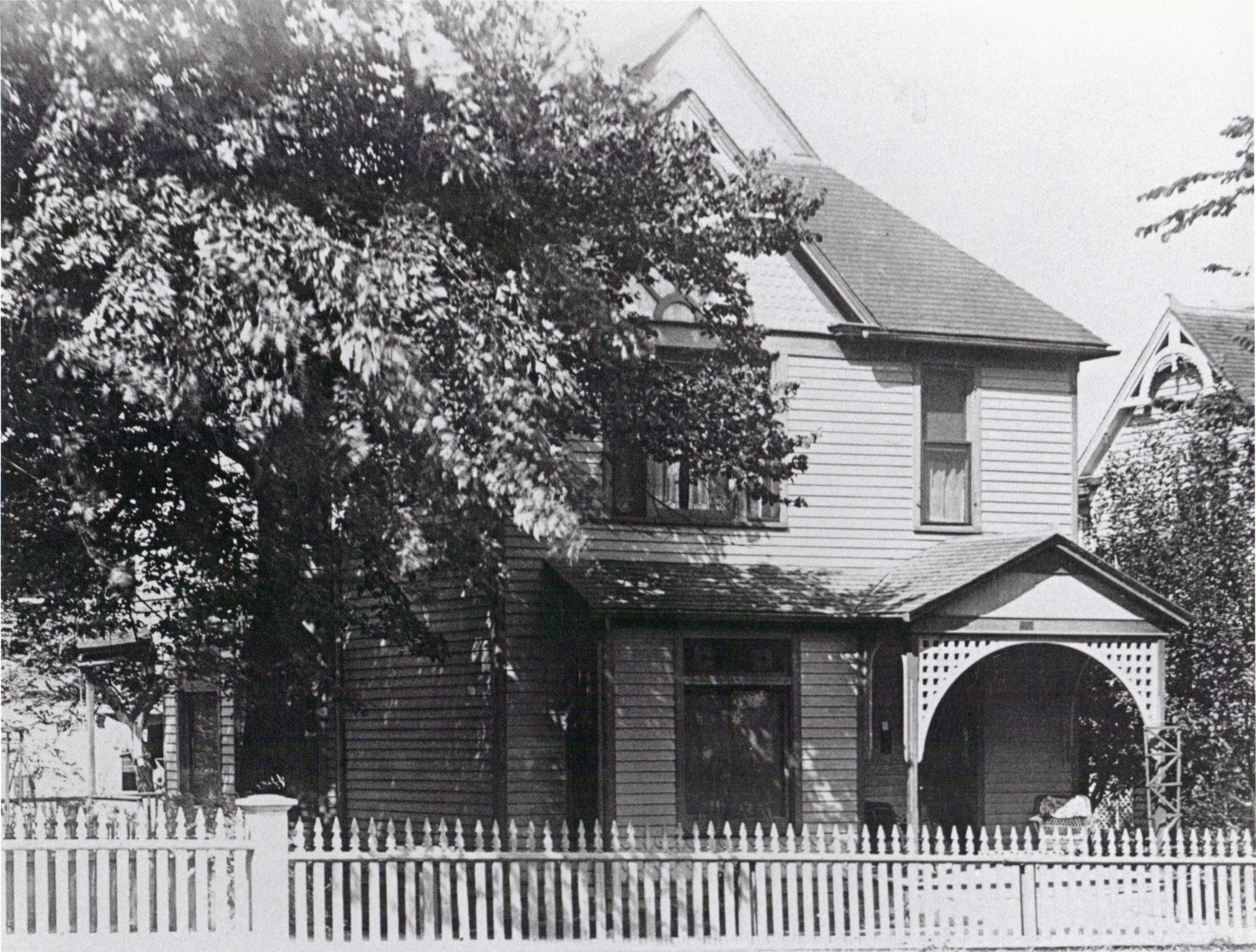
Elsasser family home, 2706 South 18th Street

== See also ==
- History of Omaha
- Vinton Street Commercial Historic District
- Arthur G. Rocheford Building
