= Mexicans in Omaha, Nebraska =

Mexicans in Omaha are people living in Omaha, Nebraska, United States who have citizenship or ancestral connections to the country Mexico. They have contributed to the economic, social and cultural well-being of Omaha for more than a century. Mexicans, or Latino people identified incorrectly as being from Mexico, have been accounted for in the history of Omaha, Nebraska since 1900. The entire Latino population of Omaha increased ninety percent between 1990 and 1997.

Mexican-Americans in Omaha have been extensively studied since at least the late 1920s. In 1998 a Mexican immigrant family in Omaha was featured in a Washington Post article. The article noted reluctance by some immigrants to assimilate, in terms of their thinking they had to give up their language or culture. Studies since then have noted that Latino children, like many immigrant children, have adapted more readily to the United States, but also like many immigrant groups, are proud to maintain traditions.

== History ==
The presence of Mexicans in Omaha was documented to the beginning of the city in 1854, and the first permanent residents arrived with the railroads in 1860.

1900 was the beginning of the first large wave of Mexicans immigrating to the U.S. According to the University of Nebraska at Omaha, around 1900, five Mexican-born residents lived in Omaha, and by 1910 there were twenty-nine. In 1920 there were 682 Mexicans in Omaha; in 1923 there were about 1,000. They lived in South Omaha, close to the three packing plants and the stockyards where many worked. In 1950 the population of Mexicans in Douglas County was 450. The loss of jobs in the Great Depression drove many Mexicans back to Mexico, but approximately 900 stayed in Omaha.

=== Struggles ===
In February 1915, Omaha Police Department Detective Tom Ring was killed while investigating a report of boxcar thieves at a rooming house at 15th and Chicago. Based on the idea the shooter was Mexican, the police department proceeded to round up and jail every Mexican they could find in Omaha. The main suspects were Jose Gonzalez and Juan Parral. Gonzalez escaped Omaha only to be shot dead under dubious circumstances outside Scribner, Nebraska. His companion Parral was captured, but was tried and sentenced under unrelated charges. After serving a few years in the Nebraska State Penitentiary, Parral was deported to Mexico. Neither man was ever convicted of the crimes they were accused of.

=== Communities ===
In the early decades of the 1900s, Mexican families established themselves in colonias next to the Chicago, Burlington, and Quincy Railroad depot south of Little Italy and Little Bohemia. The depot was called Gibson Station, and was located at South First and Hascal Streets near the Missouri River. Near South 72nd and Q Streets there was another barrio where Mexican families lived in railroad cars next to the Union Pacific-Santa Fe station. More Mexican families lived among Italian, Polish, Hungarian, and Czech immigrants. Much of the community is said to have lived in the Brown Park neighborhood, as well.

Other Mexican communities were near the Burlington Train Station around South Sixth Street; in Carville, near Gibson in South Omaha along the Missouri River, "where most lived in railroad cars on Burlington Railroad property", and along Spring Street. J.B. Hernández, a railroad worker, was the acknowledged leader of Carville. His family was viewed as the "aristocrats of Carville".

There was also a large community east of the Missouri River in Council Bluffs. The largest concentration of Mexicans and Mexican Americans in Omaha lived near the packing houses and Union Stockyards of South Omaha.

Today the majority of Mexicans and Mexican-Americans live in South Omaha, also called South O. A strong Mexican-American presence thrives there, with numerous public murals and exhibitions of Mexican culture throughout the community. Along with a variety of businesses, churches and community organizations, the area features El Museo Latino. It hosts four visits per year of the Mobile Mexican Consultant of Denver. In 1998, the community was estimated to have 20,000 Latino families.

=== Workforce ===
According to one study about the period 1900–1930, "Early censuses report few Mexicans, and existing statistics are ambiguous. Mostly, Mexicans were accounted as 'floaters,' shifting jobs between meat packing plants, section hands on the railroads, and agricultural laborers..."

Jobs in agriculture, packing houses, and railroads drew Mexican laborers to Omaha. Shortly after the beginning of World War I, the packing houses and Union Stockyards hired Mexicans as strikebreakers during a labor shortage. After the strike broke, several hundred Mexican workers stayed in Omaha. According to the Nebraska State Historical Society, there are a few remaining Mexican elders who came to Omaha through Kansas City as railroad workers for the Union Pacific and the BNSF Railway. Across Omaha there "are Mexican Americans whose grandfathers or other male relatives worked as railroad section-hands."

In Omaha in 1924 the average packinghouse paid $3.36 a day, and in 1928 ten railroad companies employed between 800 and 1000 Mexicans in the winter, and less than 250 in the summer. In the 1930s many Mexicans in Omaha traveled back and forth from western Nebraska to work in the agriculture industry.

=== Religion ===
A Roman Catholic church called Nuestra Señora de Guadalupe was founded in Omaha in 1919., and has been the "main pivot of the Hispanic community in Omaha, the state and neighboring counties in Iowa across the Missouri River." Its first home was in a rented room above a baker's shop.

During the 1960s both Catholic and Protestant congregations encouraged Mexican Americans in Omaha "to move forward with a more proactive role in claiming their identity and place in the community."

=== Crime ===
In the 1930s crime among Mexican Americans ranked "higher than any other immigrant class born in the city." Researchers attributed this to poverty, language barriers, police politics and the lack of political representation. Mexican Americans in Omaha were also the target of racial tension, with one period report finding, "at social gatherings of the schools and churches, Mexican children were spat upon and called "greasers" by other children."

== Present ==
=== Population ===
In the early 1970s a population survey conducted by the Lutheran Ministries of Omaha estimated that there were 6,490 Latinos in Omaha, with two-thirds of the population coming from Mexico. A 1978 study found that Mexican Americans in Omaha felt particular satisfaction with their lifestyle and the services that they received from the U.S. government. The same study found civic engagement high among the population. While study participants felt like they generally were not welcomed throughout their community, they were accepted.

Between 1980 and 1990, the Latino population in the Midwest increased by 35.2%. In 1990 Latinos accounted for 2.9% of the population of Omaha with the majority Mexican.

Nebraska's Latino population nearly doubled from 1990 to 2005, largely due to increases in towns with meatpacking operations located within a two hundred mile radius of Omaha. While most of that population is Mexican, the numbers are not available.

=== Religion ===
According to the Roman Catholic Archdiocese of Omaha, 74 percent of Mexicans and their American-born children in Omaha are Catholic. The streets of South Omaha, particularly the South Omaha Main Street Historic District, are packed with religious celebrations throughout the year, including the Festival of the Virgin of Guadalupe, the Day of the Dead and many other holidays in the Catholic religious calendar. According to another report, "Mexicans [in Omaha] celebrate Holy Week, one of the most important events in the Catholic liturgy, in remarkable public spectacles."

=== Culture ===
Today South Omaha is also home to El Museo Latino, located at 4701½ South 25th Street. Dedicated to Latino arts, the museum includes local, regional, national, and international exhibits. In addition to providing school tours and sponsoring a performing dance group, the museum features exhibits, family activities, art and cultural classes, and special events. It is a local repository for copies of the Omaha-related materials collected through the "Mexican American Traditions in Nebraska" project of the Nebraska State Historical Society. Nebraskans for Peace is another organization that seeks to advocate and assist Mexican Americans and Mexicans in Omaha.

=== Assimilation ===
In the 1970s demographers first starting noticing the reluctance of Omaha's Mexican-American population to assimilate into American culture. Morality and values, food, language, and cultural ties have all been cited as important attributes of Mexican culture that recent immigrants and long-time Mexican Americans in Omaha, Nebraska want to maintain. The lack of participation of Mexican-Americans in Omaha in the administration and reform of health care has also been noted as further evidence of the absence of desire to assimilate.

Mexican-Americans have begun to exert political influence in Omaha. Spanish-language newspapers sold in Omaha include Nuestro Mundo, El Perico, La Vision Latina, and El Sol de las Americas.

The Mexican Consulate was located in Omaha at 3552 Dodge Street. A 2007 neo-Nazi rally in Omaha drew 65 participants to a protest outside the consulate. Thousands were involved in counter-protests, as well as events celebrating the diversity of the city. The Mexican Consulate has since moved to 7444 Farnam Street.

== Notable Mexican Americans from Omaha ==
- Hector P. Garcia – physician, surgeon, World War II veteran, civil rights advocate, and founder of the American G.I. Forum. He completed his residency at St. Joseph's Hospital at Creighton University in Omaha.
- Edward Gomez – United States Marine who was posthumously awarded the Medal of Honor during the Korean War.
- Steve Turre – internationally renowned trombonist, recording artist, arranger, and educator born in Omaha. He is of Mexican descent.
- John Trudell – author, a poet, musician and a former political activist who was born in Omaha. He is of Mexican descent.
- Douglas Vincent "SA" Martinez – vocalist and DJ for the Los Angeles, California-based alternative rock band 311 born in Omaha.

== See also ==
- History of Omaha, Nebraska
- South Omaha
- Diaspora politics in the United States
- Culture in Omaha, Nebraska
- History of Mexican-Americans

== Bibliography ==
- Thiele, S., Jordan, T.E., Lopez, D.A., et al. (2001) The Latino Experience in Omaha. E. Mellen Press.
- González-Clements, E. (1998) "Mexican American Traditions in Nebraska." Nebraska State Historical Society. Retrieved 7/17/07.
- Dillon, J.S., Burger, P.R. and Shortridge, B.G. (2006) "The growth of Mexican restaurants in Omaha, Nebraska," Journal of Cultural Geography. 24;1.
