= Terry Rosenberg =

American artist (born 1954)

Terry Rosenberg (born 1954) is an American artist, known for painting, sculpture, and drawings that reference the body.

== Early life ==
Rosenberg was born in Hartford, Connecticut and raised in Miami, Florida. He received an Associate of Arts degree from Miami Dade College in 1974, a Bachelor of Fine Arts degree from the University of Miami in 1976, and a Master of Fine Arts degree from New York State College of Ceramics at Alfred University in 1978.

== Career ==
Rosenberg moved following school to New York City and began exhibiting cowhide sculpture and related drawings at Hal Bromm Gallery in 1980. He produced canvases on which he painted figural polymorphs, as well as suites of small drawings and collages with figural motifs. Rosenberg's sculpture developed a paradigm preoccupied with scoring and folding continuous surfaces produced from sheet materials that were at times transparent and suffused with light.

In 1994, the Sheldon Museum of Art organized Terry Rosenberg, Inside the Dance, an exhibition featuring drawings created during dance rehearsals from groups including American Ballet Theatre, Dance Theater of Harlem and Mark Morris Dance Group. In 2002 the book Figuring Motion: Terry Rosenberg was published in conjunction with an exhibition of paintings that was presented at the University of Wyoming Art Museum, Berman Museum of Art and others. Rosenberg was awarded an individual artist fellowship by New York Foundation for the Arts and residencies at the Arts Industry Program at the John Michael Kohler Arts Center and Bemis Center for Contemporary Arts. Rosenberg lives in New York City.

== Exhibitions ==
Solo exhibitions of Rosenberg's work include MoMA PS1's Clocktower Gallery, New York, New York; Sheldon Museum of Art, Lincoln, Nebraska; University of Wyoming Art Museum, Laramie, Wyoming; Tufts University Art Gallery, Bedford, Massachusetts; Berman Museum of Art at Ursinus College, Collegeville, Pennsylvania; Centro Nacional de las Artes, Mexico City; Frances Wolfson Art Gallery, Miami, Florida; Bemis Center for Contemporary Arts; and BM Contemporary Art Center, Istanbul.

Group exhibitions include Whitney Museum of American Art at Philip Morris, MoMA PS1, São Paulo Bienal, Museum of Fine Arts Boston, Smithsonian American Art Museum, Albright-Knox Art Gallery, Hayden Gallery at MIT, Everson Museum of Art, Contemporary Museum Baltimore, Montclair Art Museum, Virginia Museum of Fine Arts, Aldrich Contemporary Art Museum, Indianapolis Museum of Art, Queens Museum, SculptureCenter, Göteborgs Konsthall, Museo de Arte Contemporáneo de Oaxaca, Fondazione Mudima per l'Arte Contemporanea.

== Collections ==
Rosenberg's work can be found in the permanent collections of the Smithsonian American Art Museum, Brooklyn Museum, Albertina, Fine Arts Museums of San Francisco, Albright-Knox Art Gallery, Walker Art Center, Nelson Atkins Museum of Art, Berkeley Art Museum, South London Gallery, Smart Museum of Art, Virginia Museum of Fine Arts, Musée d'art moderne et d'art Contemporain, Arkansas Arts Center, Sheldon Museum of Art, Museo de Arte Contemporaneo de Oaxaca, Spencer Museum of Art, Joslyn Art Museum, Frost Art Museum, University of Iowa Museum of Art, Addison Gallery of American Art and others.
