= Greeks in Omaha, Nebraska =

The community of Greeks in Omaha, Nebraska, has a history that extends back to the 1880s. After they originally moved to the city following work with the railroads, the community quickly grew and founded a substantial neighborhood in South Omaha that was colloquially referred to as "Greek Town." The community was replete with Greek bakers, barbers, grocers and cafes. After a 1909 mob attack on the community, Greek immigrants fled from Omaha. Today even though the Greek-American community is smaller than it was in 1909, it includes many prominent doctors, lawyers, pharmacists, business people and others who have achieved great success here. It currently maintains two Greek Orthodox Churches.

== History ==
South Omaha, Nebraska, was incorporated as a city in 1886. The home of many European immigrant communities, it once hosted a bustling Greek Town where thousands of Greek immigrants settled from the 1870s to 1909.

=== Greek Town ===
The principal Greek community in Omaha was centered on South 26th and Q Streets. This was the heart of Greek Town. Other Greek establishments were located around South 24th and Q and South 24th and L Streets.

In 1909, there were over thirty-two businesses owned by and catering to the Greek community in South Omaha, as well as a Greek Orthodox church, a school, and several two and three-story commercial buildings. After a small immigration that started in the 1880s, large-scale growth of the Greek population in Omaha started around 1900, when workers were attracted to jobs in the meatpacking industry. Male Greek immigrants were hired by the South Omaha plants to be linebreakers in a series of strikes as labor tried to organize. According to one estimate, by 1909 there were an estimated 2,000 Greeks living in South Omaha.

Nativist sentiments were aggravated by the Greeks being hired as strikebreakers. Attitudes about the Greek community in Omaha were often negative, as expressed by the Omaha Daily News when they wrote, "Their quarters have been unsanitary; they have insulted women... Herded together in lodging houses and living cheaply, Greeks are a menace to the American laboring man – just as the Japs, Italians, and other similar laborers are." Men of these groups had been hired as strikebreakers, and American and ethnic working men also feared their willingness to work for low wages.

==== Riot ====
A Greek immigrant was arrested for loitering after being accused of having sex with a non-Greek white woman in February, 1909. During the arrest, a police officer was shot. The accused man was captured later. On February 21, a mob of 3,000 men and boys gathered outside the South Omaha jail where he was being held. Police distracted the crowd while the prisoner was moved to the Omaha City Jail, but after discovering this, the mob attacked Greektown, a local ethnic enclave. They forced Greek residents to abandon the area, destroyed businesses, and completely demolished 30 buildings.

=== Modern ===
Today, Greek Americans in Omaha number over 1,000 members; with the Greek economy having improved and restrictive immigration laws of the US, few Greeks have immigrated in recent decades.

There are now two Greek parishes: St. John's Church, the historical anchor of the community, and the Greek Orthodox Church of Greater Omaha, which is also known as GOCGO. Although there are two Greek Orthodox parishes in Omaha, the total number of parishioners is fewer than during the 1960s and 1970s.

Saint John the Baptist continues to grow in its original location, undergoing a revitalization effort in concert with Omaha's mid-town rebuilding program. The Church is known for its "Omaha's Original Greek Festival", which is held in September. On June 13 through June 15, 2008, St. John the Baptist celebrated its Centennial anniversary highlighted by a visit from Archbishop Dimitrious the head of the Greek Orthodox Church in America. The Greek Orthodox Church of Greater continues to expand as well through new families and events. The church celebrated four years of service on June 4, 2010.

With two flourishing parishes under the jurisdiction of Bishop Isaiah of the Denver Metropolis, Omaha's Greek community continues to assimilate with Omaha. With more than 100 years in Nebraska and Iowa, Greek Americans have a long history in the Omaha area.

== Notable Greeks from Omaha ==
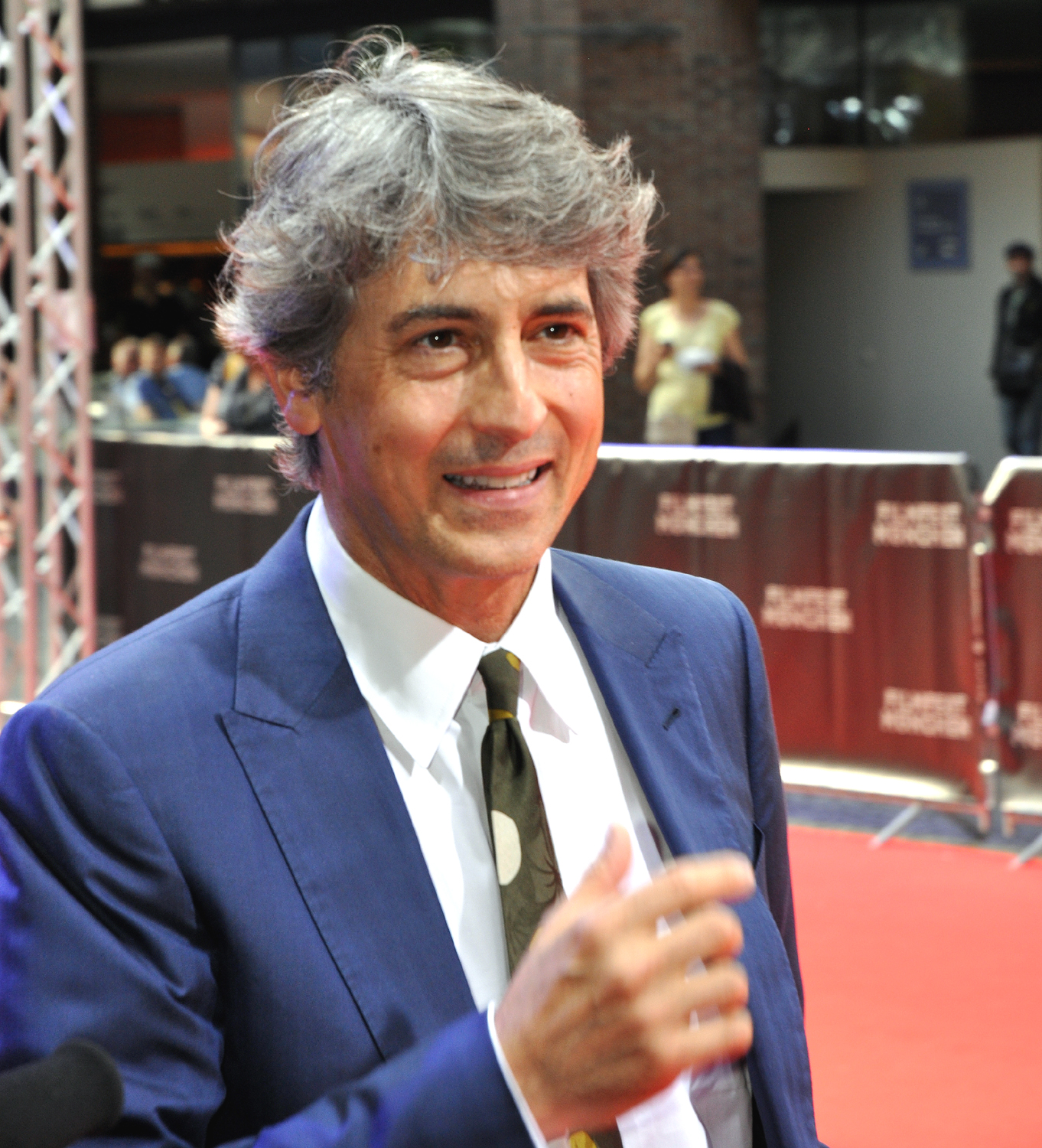
Alexander Payne, film director

Omaha has been featured in films by Omaha native Greek-American Alexander Payne. The Oscar-winning screenwriter and director shot parts of About Schmidt, Citizen Ruth and Election in the city. On January 15, 2012, Alexander won a Golden Globe for Best Motion Picture for The Descendants.

In 2005, Payne joined the board of directors of Film Streams, a nonprofit arts organization which opened a two-screen cinema in downtown Omaha in 2007. They want to build an audience for more challenging films, as well as continue to promote Omaha as a place for film production.

== See also ==
- Greektown
- South Omaha, Nebraska
- History of Omaha, Nebraska
- Diaspora politics in the United States
- Timeline of racial tension in Omaha, Nebraska
