= Hanscom Park =

Neighborhood in Omaha, Nebraska, United States

Coordinates: 41°14′31″N 95°57′29″W

Hanscom Park Neighborhood
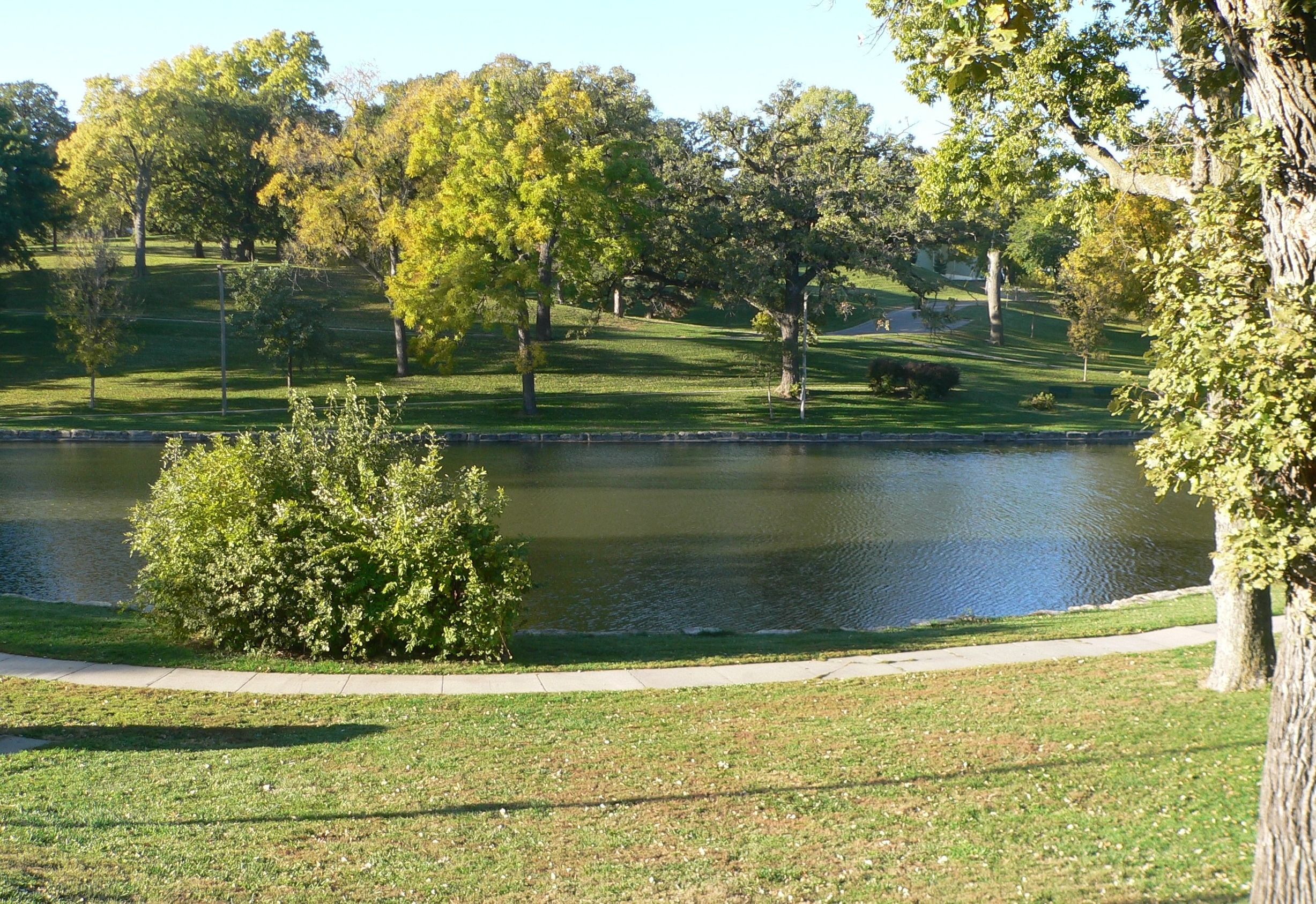
- Lake at Hanscom Park
- Interactive map of Hanscom Park Neighborhood
- Type: Municipal (Omaha)
- Location: Midtown Omaha
- Created: 1899
- Status: Open all year

Hanscom Park is a historic neighborhood in Midtown Omaha, Nebraska. Its namesake public park is one of the oldest parks in Omaha, donated to the City in 1872. U.S. President Gerald R. Ford was born in a house in the Hanscom Park neighborhood. Its boundaries are Woolworth Street on the north, South 42nd on the west, Interstate 480 on the east and I-80 on the south.

== History ==
Hanscom Park is one of the oldest residential subdivisions in Omaha. Andrew J. Hanscom and James Megeath donated the 50-acre (200,000 m^{2}) park in October 1872. Hanscom bought the land from Colonel Sam Bayliss, one of the original homesteaders in Omaha City in 1854. When the community was developed through the 1890s, it was on the western fringe of Omaha. The site was ideal for an upscale development because of its access to a new electric trolley line connecting it with downtown.

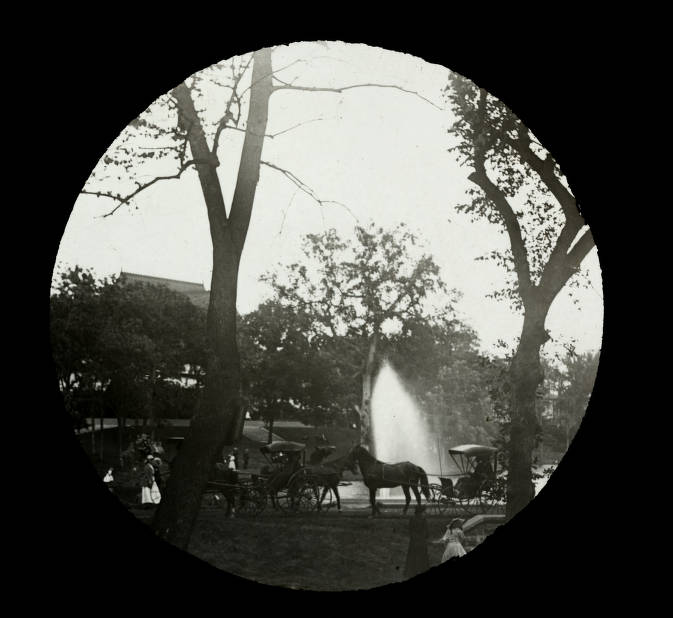
The park c. 1890-1900

The neighborhood is home to several notable houses. One of them, the George N. Hicks House, has been designated an Omaha Landmark. In 1913, U.S. President Gerald Ford was born in his grandfather's mansion at 3202 Woolworth Avenue in the Hanscom Park neighborhood. Today the Gerald R. Ford Birthsite and Gardens celebrates this location.

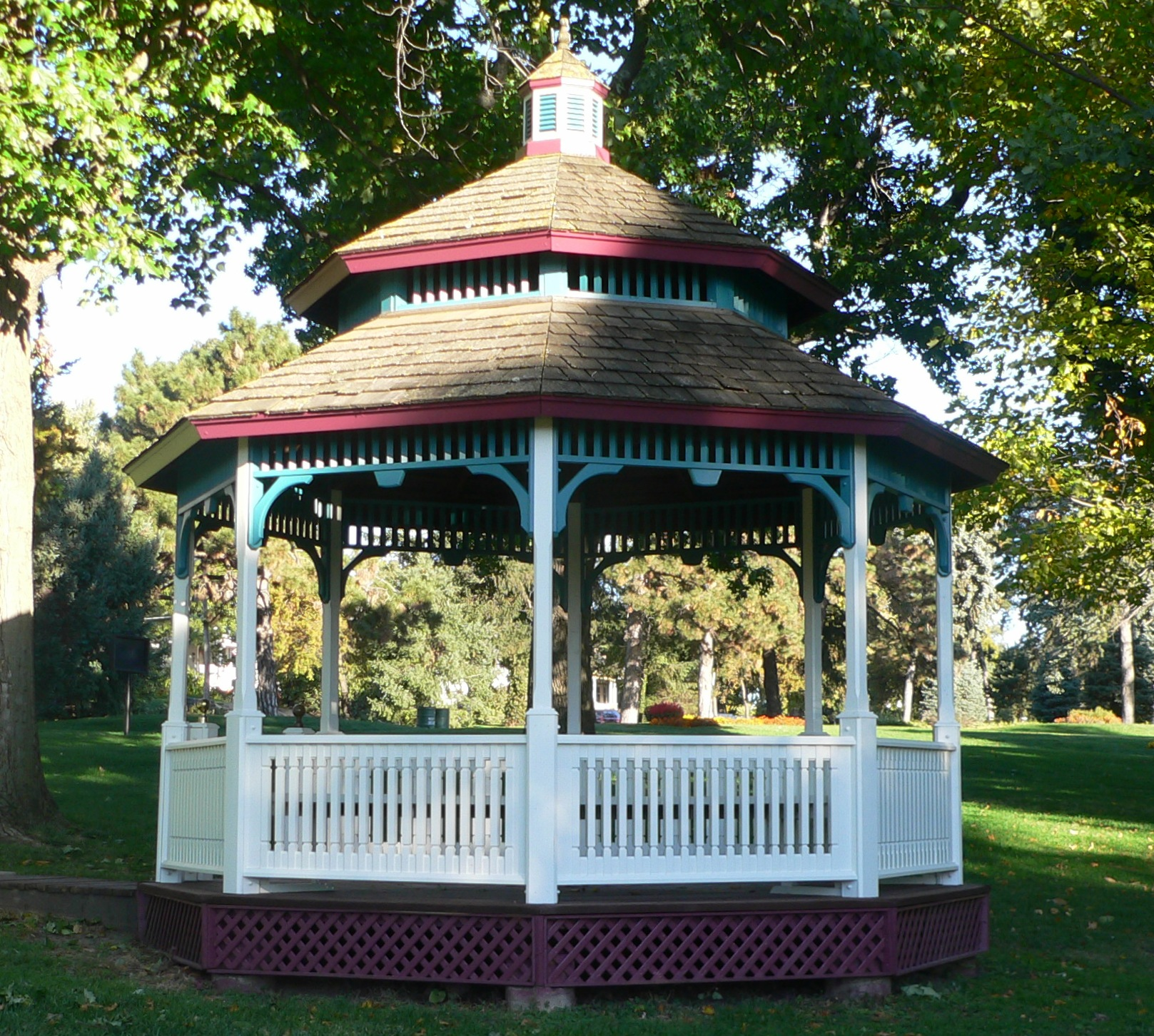
Replica of historic bandstand in park

=== Hanscom Park ===
Hanscom Park, located at 1899 South 32nd Avenue, was developed by the City of Omaha in 1889 as one of the first by the newly formed Park Commission. After paying a landscape architect $913.30 for plans to improve the rough tract of land, the Commission reported the park was, "radically changed in plan and very greatly improved... Two lakes, a cascade, extensive flower beds, two and one-half miles of macadamized roadway, fountains and a magnificent growth of forest trees makes this the only finished park in the city." Design elements from that time have survived. The Brandeis Indoor Tennis Courts facility is also located within the park property. The park is bordered on the East by Park Ave and the West border is 32nd Ave. The North border for the park is Woolworth Ave and the South border is Ed Creighton Ave.

== Present ==
After years of historical houses in the neighborhood being converted into apartments, there has been a noticeable increase in the number of properties that have been returned to single family homes during the past few years.

== See also ==
- Neighborhoods of Omaha, Nebraska
- Hanscom Park United Methodist Church
