= South Omaha, Nebraska =

Neighborhood of Omaha, US

Coordinates: 41°12′38″N 95°57′45″W

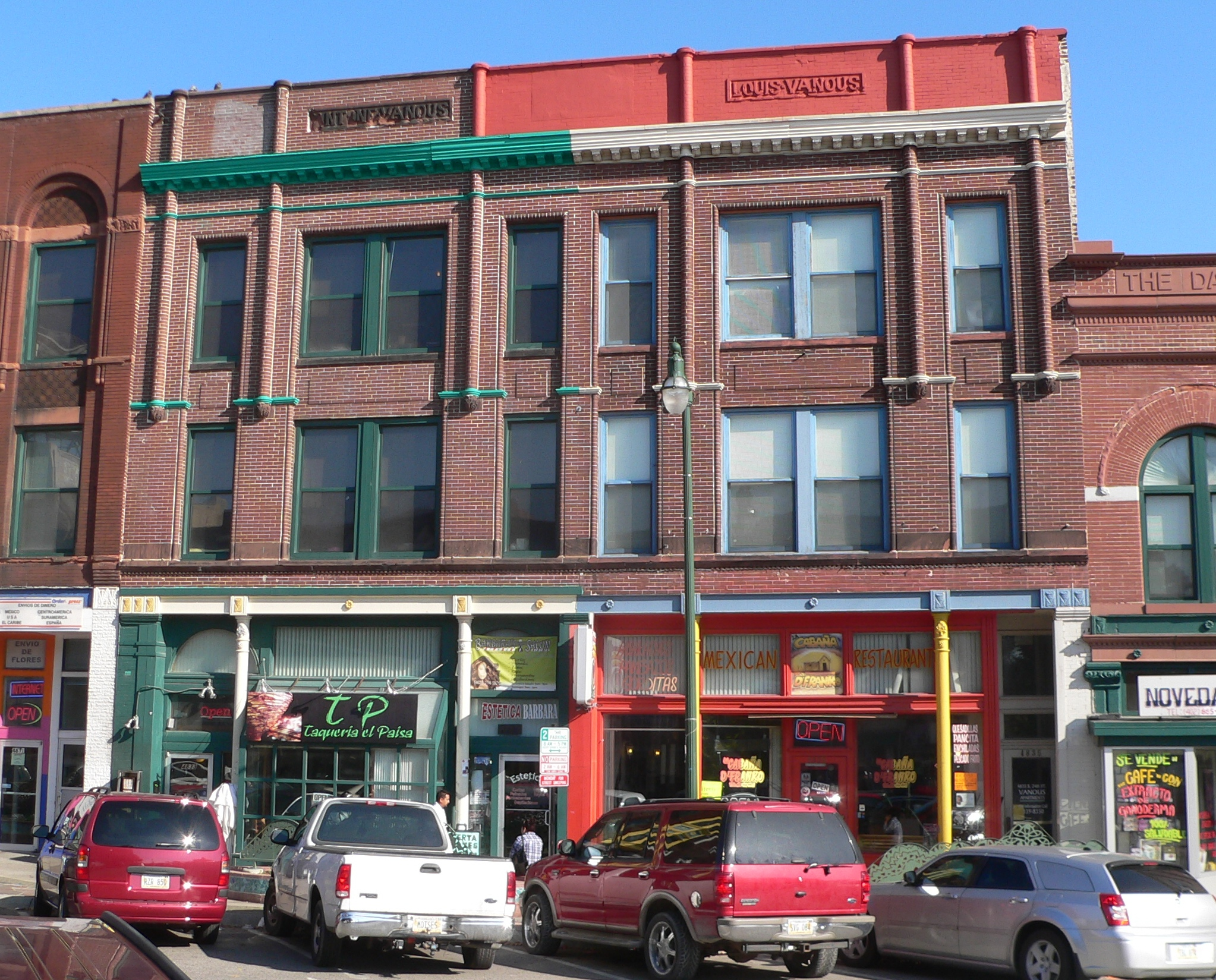
Vanous Block, at 4833-35 S. 24th Street

South Omaha is a former city and current district of Omaha, Nebraska, United States. During its initial development phase, the town's nickname was "The Magic City" because of the seemingly overnight growth due to the rapid development of the Union Stockyards. Annexed by the City of Omaha in 1915, the community has numerous historical landmarks; many are within the South Omaha Main Street Historic District.

== Definition ==
The traditional borders of South Omaha included Vinton Street to the north, Harrison Street to the south, the Missouri River to the east, and 42nd Street to the west.

== History ==
The area that would become South Omaha was rural until the early 1880s when cattle baron Alexander Hamilton Swan decided to establish a stockyards operation just south of Omaha. The South Omaha plat was registered on July 18, 1884. Two years later, South Omaha was incorporated as a city. By 1890, the city had grown to 8,000 people, a rate of growth that earned it the nickname "The Magic City".

In less than 10 years, South Omaha had developed as a regional stockyards and meatpacking center. Its industrial jobs did not require high-level language skills, so it drew thousands of immigrant workers, mostly from eastern and southern Europe. This area of the city showed ethnic succession as different waves of immigrants established certain territories as their own during their first settlement. Some descendants moved out of the area into other parts of the city, and newer immigrant groups filled the neighborhoods behind them.

South Omaha was annexed by Omaha on June 20, 1915. At that time, it was 6.4 mi² and had 40,000 residents. In 1947, there were 15,000 people working in meatpacking. Structural changes to the meatpacking industry in the 1960s, including decentralization of operations, cost the city 10,000 jobs.

== Cultural diversity ==
South Omaha was, and continues to be, culturally diverse. Many residents are descended from the Czech, Irish, Italian, Latino, Lithuanian, and Polish immigrants who made up the original workforce in the meatpacking industry; they were primarily Roman Catholic in religion. In recent decades, South Omaha has seen an influx of new immigrants representing Hispanic and Sudanese populations.

=== Places of worship ===
The early diversity is evident in the variety of religious institutions established by the various ethnic communities, which established national Roman Catholic and other places of worship, including

Catholic Churches:

- Irish – St. Mary's, St. Bridget's and St. Patrick's
- German – St. Rose and St. Joseph
- Czech – Assumption and St. Adalbert's
- Polish – St. Stanislaus, Immaculate Conception Church and St. Francis of Assisi
- Lithuanian – St. Anthony's
- Italian – St. Francis Cabrini and St. Ann's
- Croatian – Sts. Peter and Paul
- Hispanic – Our Lady of Guadalupe

Orthodox churches:

- Greeks – St. John's Greek Orthodox
- Serbian – St. Nicholas
- Romanian – Holy Cross

In the late 19th century, a Jewish synagogue was established in South Omaha.

=== Periodicals ===
In addition to the churches, in the early part of the 20th century, the Lithuanian community published a newspaper, known as the Bell of the West.

== Landmarks in South Omaha ==
Place name	Year built	Location	National Register of Historic Places	Omaha Landmark
Arthur G. Rocheford Building	1913	1717 Vinton Street	Yes	Yes
Breckenridge-Gordon House	1905	3611 Jackson Street	No	Yes
Broatch Building	1880	1209 Harney Street	No	Yes
Center School (Omaha, Nebraska)	1893	1730 South 11th Street	Yes	Yes
Columbian School	1892	3819 Jones Street	Yes	Yes
Elsasser Bakery	1933	1802-1804 Vinton Street	Yes	Yes
Epeneter House	1905	502 North 40th Street	No	Yes
Ford Hospital	1916	121 South 25th Street	Yes	No
Franklin School			Yes	No
Gallagher Building	1888	1902-1906 South 13th Street	Yes	Yes
Georgia Row House	1890	1040-1044 South 29th Street	Yes	No
Gottlieb Storz House	1905	3708 Farnam Street	Yes	Yes
Grossman Apartment			No	Yes
Guy C. Barton House			Yes	No
Hanscom Park	1876		No	No
Hicks House			No	Yes
Hicks Terrace			No	Yes
Immaculate Conception Church and School			Yes	No
Joel N. Cornish House			Yes	No
Kimball House			No	Yes
Kuncl-Hruska House			No	Yes
Little Bohemia		Bounded by South 10th Street on the east, South 16th Street on the west, Pierce Street on the north, and Martha Street on the south	No	No
Little Italy		Bounded by Pacific Street on the north, Center Street on the south, South 10th Street on the west and the Missouri River on the east.	No	No
Livestock Exchange Building	1926	4920 South 30th Street	Yes	Yes
Mason School		1012 South 24th Street	Yes	Yes
Mason Terrace & Van Closter Residence			No	Yes
McLaughlin House			No	Yes
Megeath House			No	Yes
Neble House			No	Yes
Packer’s National Bank Building			Yes	Yes
Park School			Yes	Yes
Porter House			Yes	Yes
Prague Hotel			Yes	No
Robbins School			No	Yes
Rosewater School			Yes	Yes
Saint Joseph Parish Complex			Yes	Yes
St. John's Collegiate Church			No	Yes
St. Martin of Tours Episcopal Church			Yes	Yes
St. Matthias Episcopal Church			Yes	No
St Philomena's Cathedral and Rectory - now known as St Frances Cabrini Church			Yes	Yes
Slater House			No	Yes
South Omaha Bridge	1936	Located on Hwys 275/92 over the Missouri River	Yes	No
South Omaha Main Street Historic District	1883	South 24th Street between M Street on the north and O Street on the south	Yes	No
South Omaha Public Library	1904	Razed in 1953.	No	No
Steiner Rowhouse No. 1			Yes	No
Steiner Rowhouse No. 2			Yes	No
Swoboda Bakery			Yes	No
Union State Bank Building			No	Yes
Vinton School			Yes	Yes
Vinton Street Commercial Historic District		Along Vinton Street between Elm Street on the west and South 17th Street on the east	Yes	Yes
Wattles House			No	Yes
Zabriskie House			Yes	Yes

== Notable people ==
- Dale Carnegie, the future motivational speaker and writer, had his first job out of college here, working for Armour & Company as their South Omaha sales representative.
- Johnny Goodman, golfer, winner of U.S. Amateur and U.S. Open; born in South Omaha

== See also ==
- South Omaha (category)
- Greek Town riot
