= Downtown Omaha =

Central business district in Omaha, Nebraska

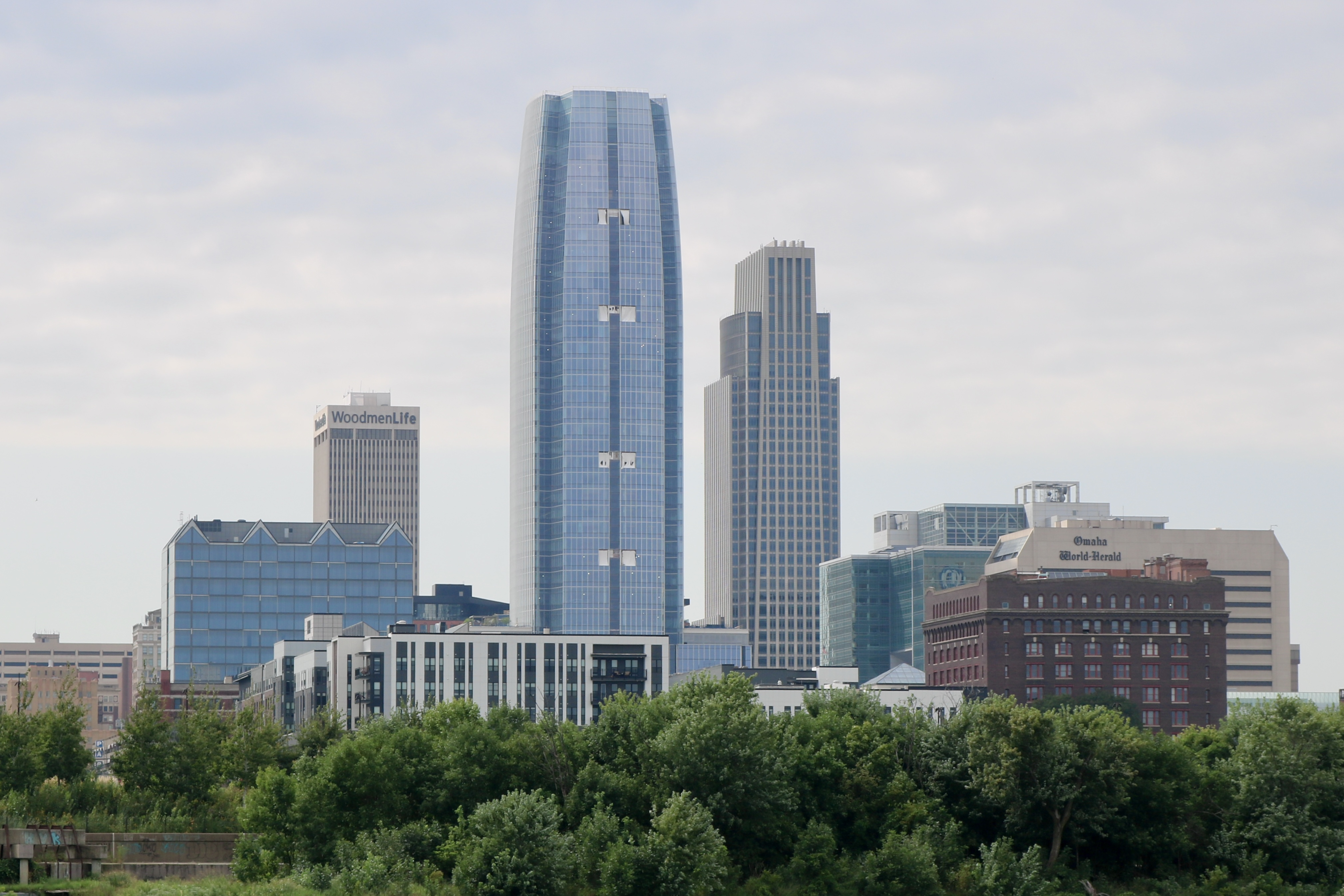
- View of Downtown Omaha looking west from Council Bluffs, Iowa
- Nicknames: Gateway to the West, the Big O
- Interactive map of Downtown Omaha
- Coordinates: 41°15′30″N 95°56′31″W
- Country: United States
- State: Nebraska
- Counties: Douglas County
- City: Omaha

Area
  - Total: 0.72 sq mi (1.86 km^{2})
  - Land: 0.70 sq mi (1.81 km^{2})
  - Water: 0.019 sq mi (0.05 km^{2}) 2.78%
- Elevation: 1,090 ft (330 m)

Population (2010)
  - Total: 10,334
  - Density: 14,790/sq mi (5,709/km^{2})
- ZIP code: 68102
- Area codes: 402, 531
- Website: omahadowntown.org

Downtown Omaha is the central business, government and social core of the Omaha–Council Bluffs metropolitan area, U.S. state of Nebraska. The boundaries are Omaha's 20th Street on the west to the Missouri River on the east and the centerline of Leavenworth Street on the south to the centerline of Chicago Street on the north, also including the CHI Health Center Omaha. Downtown sits on the Missouri River, with commanding views from the tallest skyscrapers.

Dating almost to the city's inception, downtown has been a popular location for the headquarters of a variety of companies. The Union Pacific Railroad has been headquartered in Omaha since its establishment in 1862. Downtown Omaha was also the site of the Jobbers Canyon Historic District, which housed 24 historic warehouses. All 24 buildings were demolished in 1989, representing the largest single loss of buildings to date from the National Register. The site was home to many import and export businesses necessary for the settlement and development of the American West.

Today dozens of companies have their national and regional headquarters in downtown Omaha. The area is home to more than 30 buildings listed on the National Register of Historic Places, along with two historic districts.

== History ==
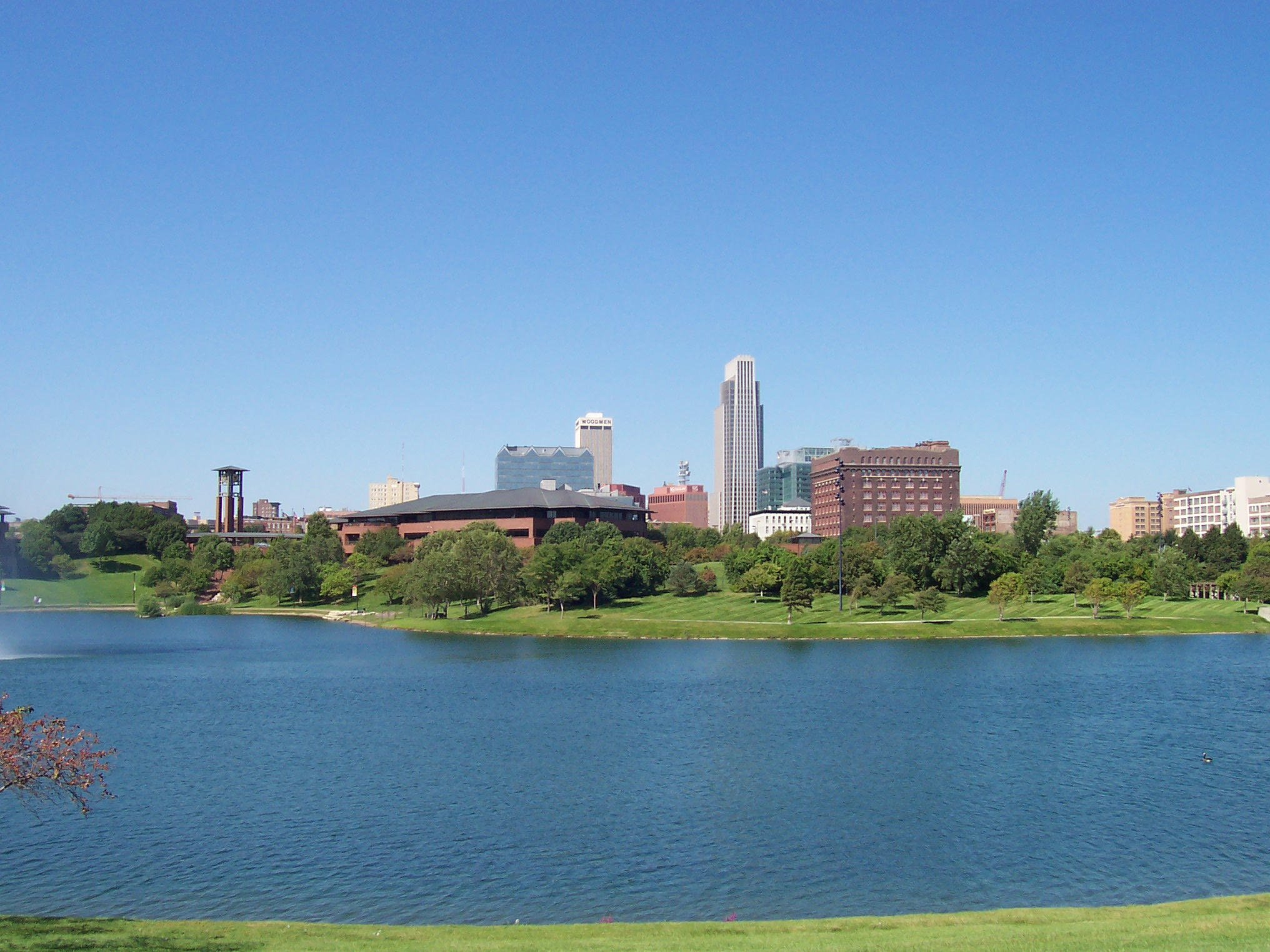
Skyline from Heartland of America Park, 2003

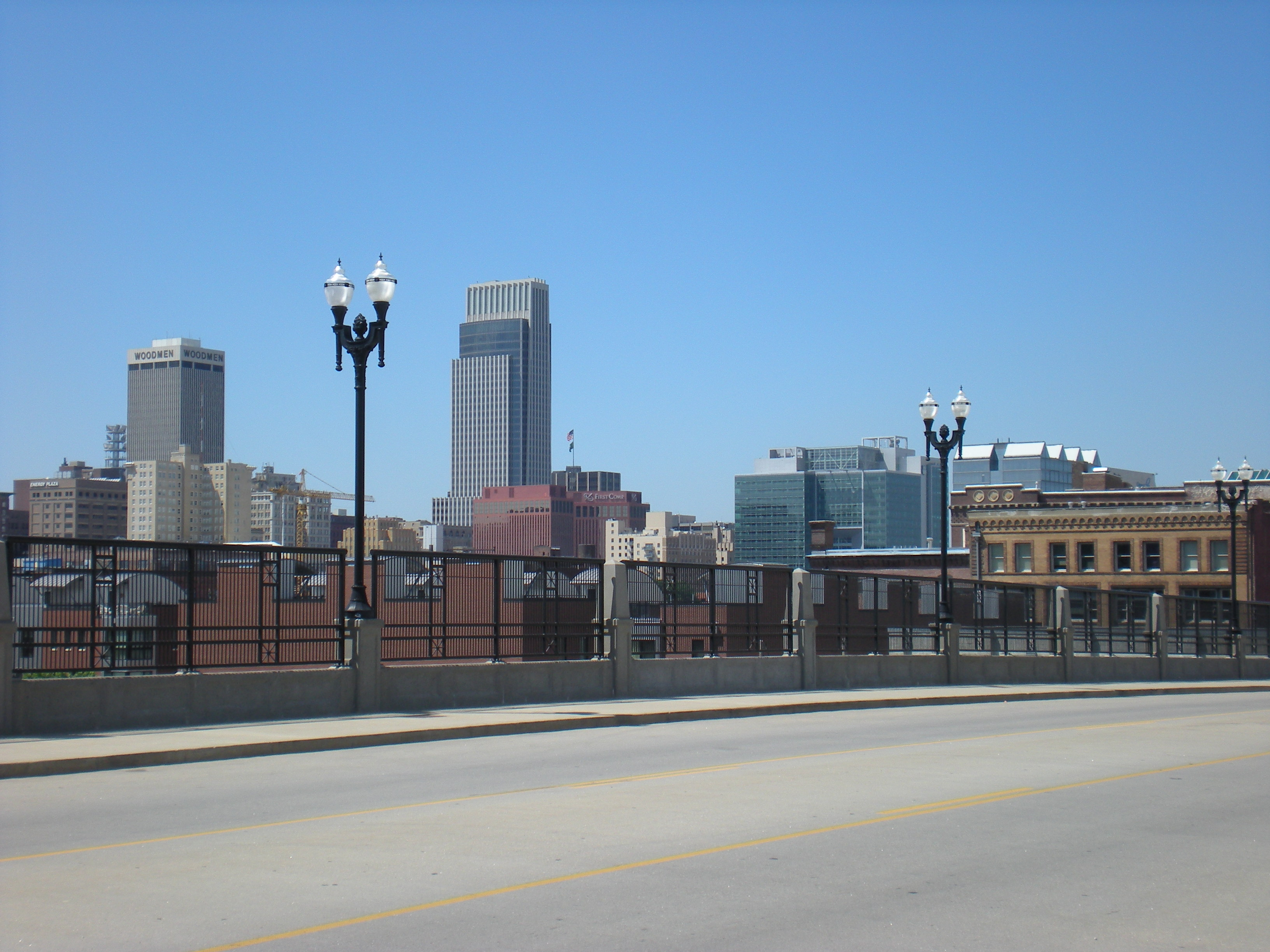
View of Downtown Omaha looking north from the 10th Street Bridge, 2008

Downtown Omaha was the location of the settlement of the city. William D. Brown's Lone Tree Ferry landing was the site of Omaha's first development. In 2004 a map expert using GPS and old maps identified a location near Gallup University as the location of the ferry landing. Omaha Central High School, located at 124 North 20th Street, is on the site where the city's founders first met on July 4, 1854, for a celebration to found the city.

Much of Omaha's grim history happened downtown, as well. The Douglas County Courthouse was twice the location of racially motivated lynchings. The first occurred when George Smith, a local worker, was accused of raping a white woman and dragged from the jail in the courthouse to his death. The second was the mass mob murder of Willy Brown in 1919, in which Mayor Ed Smith was lynched and almost murdered as well. The event, coordinated by city boss Tom Dennison, was in retaliation of Smith's reform administration. Dennison operated a private bank at 1409 Douglas Street, bankrolling a number of illegal operations throughout the city. He was likely in control of the city's Sporting District, a downtown neighborhood where debauchery of all sorts took place.

Today the highlight of downtown's social scene, the Old Market was once a warehouse district on par with the Jobbers Canyon. Torn down in 1989, Jobbers Canyon was a large area of warehouses in which much of Omaha's industrial wealth was made. Other historical areas downtown included Chinatown, the Burnt District and the Sporting District. The latter two areas were locations for much of the crime in Omaha in the late 19th century and early 20th century.

== Neighborhoods ==
Downtown Omaha is generally thought of as a large neighborhood itself; however, currently and historically within it are several distinct areas. The Old Market Historic District has been rehabilitated into boutique shops, offices and loft residential units. On the south edge of downtown bordering Little Italy, the Burlington Station is one of the buildings in the Omaha Rail and Commerce Historic District that has been renovated into residential apartments.

=== North Downtown ===
A new mixed-use development, North Downtown extends 80 blocks, from the campus of Creighton University to the CHI Health Center, Charles Schwab Field and new developments along the Missouri River. The boundaries are Seward Street on the north, I-480 on the south, 17th Street to the west and Riverfront Drive on the east.

The area comprising NoDo is central to the history of Omaha. Along the river, Miller's Landing was the site where the Lone Tree Ferry brought settlers from Iowa. The early Territorial Legislature platted Scriptown in the area. The historic neighborhood of Squatter's Row and the city's notorious prostitution alleyway, The Cribs, were located here.

Today the area includes the new Slowdown venue. The new TD Ameritrade Park opened in April 2011 near CenturyLink Center as the new home of the College World Series and Creighton University baseball. The area also includes national retailers and several restaurants, bars, and coffee shops. Several buildings have also been renovated into apartments and condos. The Missouri River riverfront is the eastern boundary of NoDo where millions in redevelopment has taken place in recent years. The city has created a new boardwalk, walking trails, and the Lewis & Clark Landing which connect to the Heartland of America Park and, in-conjunction, host several of Omaha's annual festivals, like the Taste of Omaha. A city marina has opened for Missouri River boaters. Buildings along the riverfront include the National Park Service Midwest Regional Office and Lewis and Clark National Historic Trail visitors center, The Gallup Organization operational headquarters, Gallup University Campus, and two residential towers, RiverFront Place Condos. Near these buildings is the 3,000 ft footbridge, the Bob Kerrey Pedestrian Bridge.

The movement in Omaha to reintroduce street cars is led by former mayor Hal Daub. The proposed streetcars would cost $55 million and run in a 3.5-mile (5.6 km) loop through Downtown Omaha and NoDo. The system would cost about $2 million per year to operate and would serve almost 7,000 passengers in its first year. One route would run the cars from Creighton University near 20th and Webster streets, proceeding east to 10th Street, passing by the CenturyLink Center and moving south to Jackson Street in the Old Market. After that it would then move west to 16th Street and then north to Farnam before returning to 10th Street.

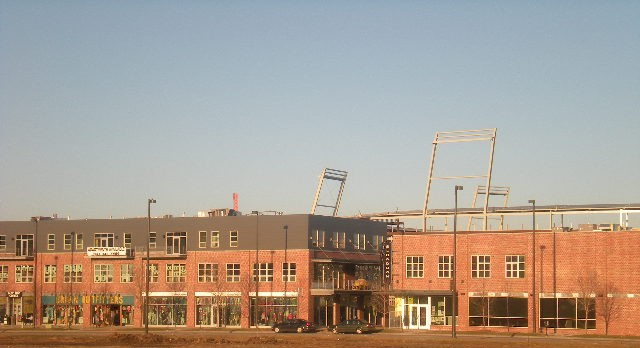
View of North Downtown looking to the East; TD Ameritrade Park Omaha rises behind the Slowdown venue.

North Downtown establishments
Name	Location
CHI Health Center	455 North 10th Street
Charles Schwab Field	1200 Mike Fahey St
Creighton University	320 N 20th St
Slowdown	729 North 14th Street
Morrison Stadium	2500 California Plaza
Miller's Landing	151 Freedom Park Rd
Lewis and Clark National Historic Trail Headquarters	601 Riverfront Drive
RiverFront Place Condos	555 Riverfront Plz
Gallup University Campus	1001 Gallup Dr

=== Park East ===
This neighborhood is considered the gateway to Downtown Omaha. Although, due to its tall buildings and proximity to downtown, most Omaha citizens consider this area to be part of the downtown central district. The area runs from 20th street on the east to 28th street on the west and from Dodge street to the north and Leavenworth to the south. The neighborhood, situated between Midtown Omaha and Downtown, is home to several historic buildings as well as some of Omaha's tallest buildings. The area has some of Omaha's major art institutions such as the Joslyn Art Museum, the Omaha Children's Museum, and the Rose Theater. There are still major employers in the area, such as Physicians Mutual Insurance Company, but there is also evidence of better days gone past such as the now vacant Northern Natural Gas Building. Omaha's Destination Midtown has been working to restore the area in recent years, as well as other Midtown neighborhoods, and evidence of revitalization can be seen in newly restored condos and apartments in the area. As of 2004, an elementary school, Liberty Elementary, has been established to serve the growing downtown population.

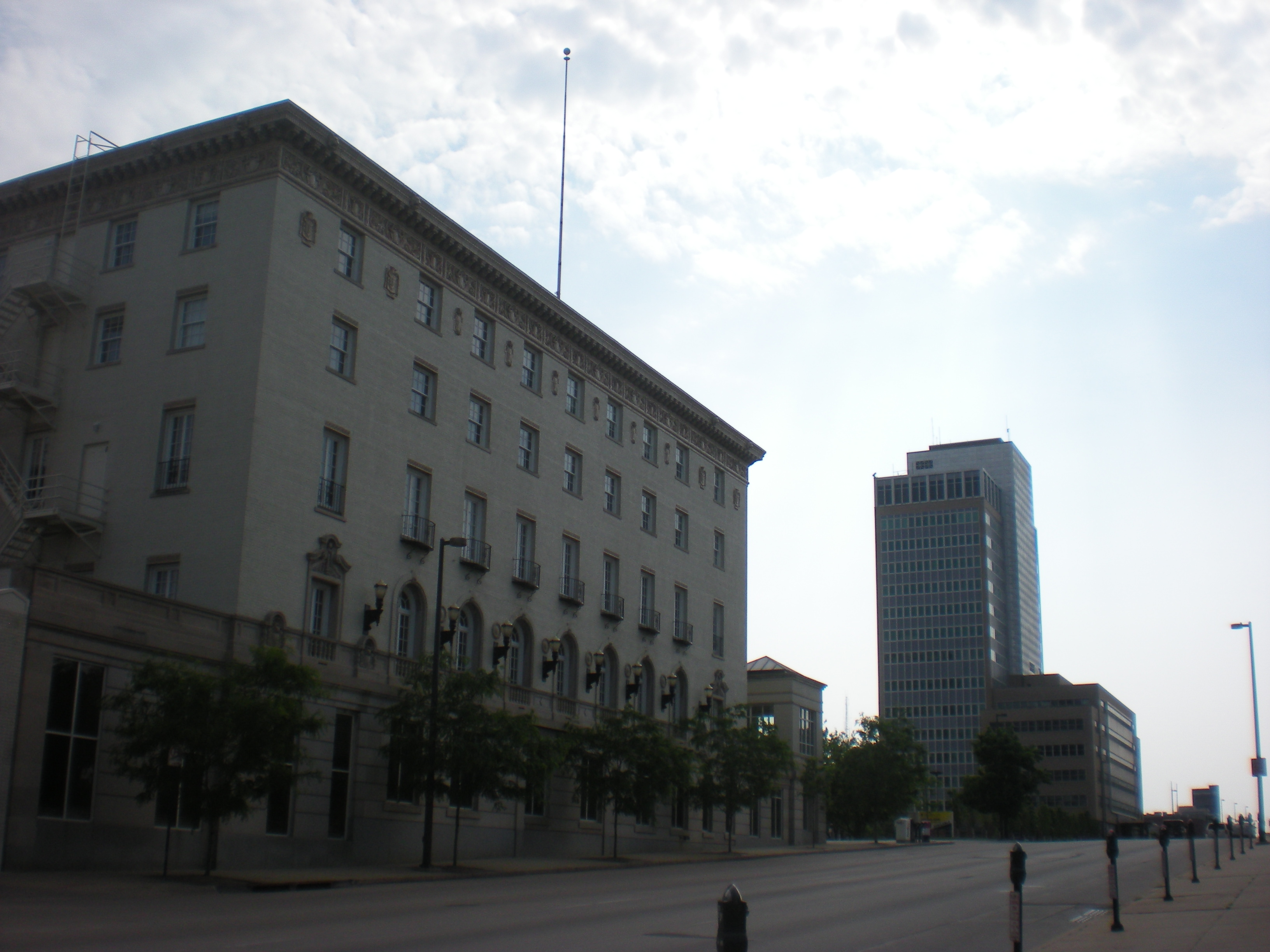
Dodge Street heading west, entering Park East. The Northern Natural Gas Building in view is the tallest building in the Park East neighborhood.

Home to the original Nebraska State Capitol, the Park East neighborhood has hosted several significant historical buildings and structures. One of Omaha's original parks, Jefferson Square, was located in the neighborhood, with the Market House and Omaha's first school located in the park. The Old Post Office and other buildings were there, too.

Park East establishments
Name	Location
Joslyn Art Museum	2200 Dodge Street
Omaha Children's Museum	500 S 20th Street
The Rose, Omaha	2665 Farnam Street
Northern Natural Gas Building	2223 Dodge Street
Physicians Mutual Building	2600 Dodge Street
Westbrook Tower	2121 Douglas Street
Omaha Central High School	124 N. 20th Street
Scoular Building	2027 Dodge Street
Ford Hospital	121 South 25th Street

=== Old Market ===
The Old Market is a neighborhood bordered by South 10th Street. The neighborhood has many restaurants, art galleries and upscale shopping, and is the location of several condominiums, including the JLofts on the Market and the Broatch Building. The area retains its brick paved streets from the turn of the 20th century, horse-drawn carriages, and covered sidewalks in some areas. It is not uncommon to see a variety of street performers, artists and other vendors.

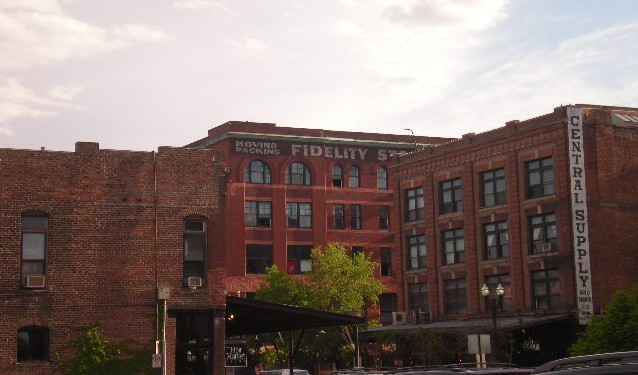
View of 11th and Howard in the Old Market District; several of the original buildings have been urbanized.

Notable locations
Name	Location
Poppleton Block	1001 Farnam Street
St. Nicholas Hotel	12th and Jackson Streets
Anheuser-Busch Beer Depot	1207-1215 Jones Street
Douglas House	13th and Harney Streets
Omaha Bolt, Nut and Screw Building	1316 Jones Street
First Woodman of the World Building	15th and Howard Streets
Grand Central Hotel	14th and Farnam Streets

=== Market West ===
Market West is a newly established neighborhood to the west of the Old Market and to the south of the Central Business District. Market West is represented by the Market West Neighborhood Alliance, established in 2011. The official boundaries are construed as, but not limited to, S 17th street to the west, S 13th street to the east, Howard street to the north and the train tracks to the south.

Part of Market West is included in the Omaha Rail and Commerce Historic District. While the neighborhood is dominated by historic warehouses, the area is beginning to see new construction of apartment buildings. The area of Market West is often confused with the Old Market, as south 13th street is the most obvious boundary - the actual historically designated area of the Old Market Historic District is a few square blocks.

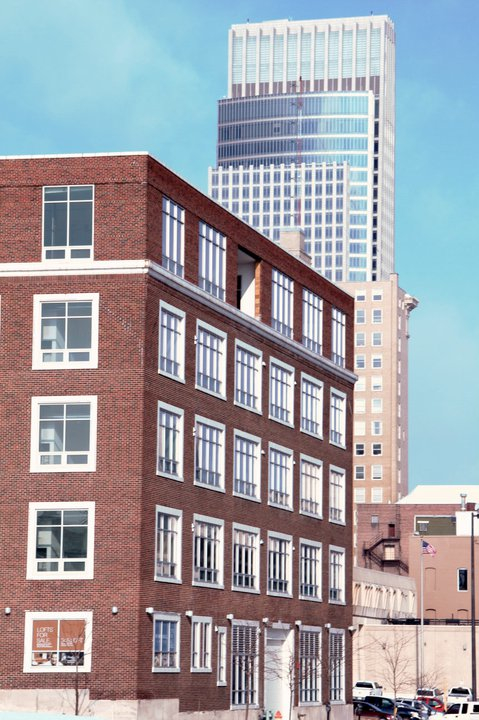
View of Market West looking north, with the Kimball Lofts Building in the foreground and the First National Tower in the distance

Notable Historic Buildings
Name	Location
Aquila Court Building (Magnolia Hotel)	1615 Howard Street
Eggerss-O'Flyng Building	801 South 15th Street
Flatiron Hotel	1722 St. Mary's Avenue
Hill Hotel	505 South 16th Street
Omaha Bolt, Nut and Screw Building	1316 Jones Street

== Restoration and expansion projects ==
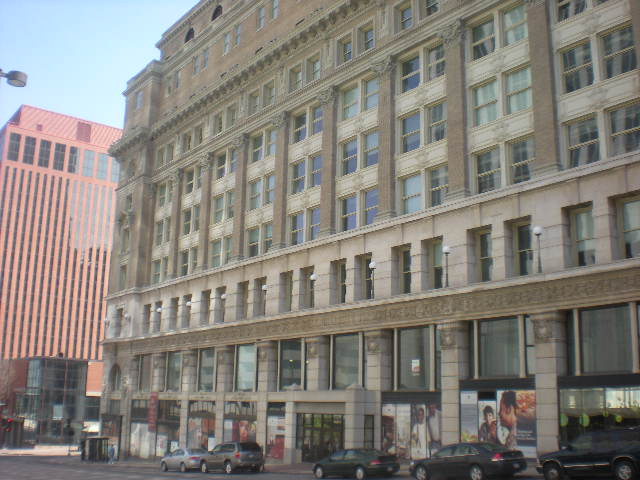
The Brandeis Building, in downtown, has recently gone through a major restoration project.

Several projects commencing in Downtown Omaha are restoring and expanding the city's core. Omaha's own HDR, Inc. designed downtown's important Omaha World-Herald Freedom Center, which opened in 2001.

The Bob Kerrey Pedestrian Bridge is sparking a riverfront expansion project in Omaha and Council Bluffs. The bridge has a very modern design with two 200-foot (61 m) spires that have sail-like appearances and multi-color LED light panels at the top. The Omaha side of the riverfront project has restaurants, businesses, and two condo towers twelve and fifteen stories tall and a large plaza area with jumping fountains, statues, and seating.

A new downtown baseball stadium, TD Ameritrade Park, is under construction in the NoDo area. The stadium will seat 24,000 and could be expanded to hold as many as 35,500. The stadium will feature open air concourses and will have impressive views of the downtown skyline from the third base side. The stadium will face southeast towards the Qwest Center, and the new riverfront developments, the Bob Kerrey Pedestrian Bridge and, RiverFront Place Condos.

=== New residential developments 2010 - 2020 ===
The 2008 financial crisis did not impact Omaha as much as other areas of the country. In addition, the recovery in residential construction in Downtown Omaha was much swifter than the suburban west Omaha. Many new residential developments have been completed or are ongoing. The list below totals 2,270 new units completed or planned since 2008 valued at approximately $513 million.

1. The Wire – 300 units, this is a converted office building which was originally built in 1957 – Northwestern Bell Telephone Company Regional Headquarters This development features a pool, indoor basketball court, and a rooftop deck. Construction completed in 2015 with a total investment of $41,300,000.
2. The Highline – 194 units, this was the old Northern Natural Gas Building, but now is the tallest residential building in Downtown Omaha. Construction completed in 2013 with a total investment of $25,788,445.
3. SLATE – 117 units, this is another old office building nearby The Wire. Construction completed in 2013 with a total investment of $13,035,115.
4. The Bank – 106 units, the success of this development catalyzed the recent boom in apartment construction in Downtown Omaha. Construction completed in 2011 with a total investment of $17,411,386.
5. The Bank Expansion – 212 units, redevelopment and addition of additional stories above Wells Fargo branch on 19th and Douglas St. Estimated completion in 2020. Total investment: $34,000,000.
6. The Breakers – 217 units, former power plant converted into apartments in 2017, this building is between the Old Market and Missouri River northeast of the Durham Museum. Total investment was $36,000,000
7. Capitol District – 218 units, this new construction is nearby the CHI Health Center Omaha, on the same block as the Marriott hotel, and inside the Capitol District which is located north of the Old Market. Construction was completed in 2018 with a total investment of $205,000,000.
8. The Corvina – 125 units, this new building is on the location of the historic Butternut building which burned down in 2004. Nearby is the Durham museum, FLIXX Lounge & Cabaret Show Bar and Blue Barn Theater. The development will also feature a pool. Construction was completed in 2014 with a total investment of $22,557,923.
9. The Rochester – 75 units, this is located near the famous Hot Shops of NoDo (North Downtown Omaha) and TD Ameritrade stadium. Construction expected to be completed in 2015 with a total investment of $10,650,000.
10. L14 Flats – 42 units, this is a new construction located on the edge of the Old Market. Construction completed in 2012 with a total investment of $5,860,621.
11. The Limelight – 40 units, originally a commercial store built in 1947, 3 floors are being constructed on top of the existing 2 floors of this building. One useful perk is that each unit will include a wine refrigerator. Construction expected to be completed in 2015 with a total investment of $6,000,000.
12. Jones13 – 100 units, this new construction very near the Old Market and around the corner from the largest gay dance club between Chicago and Denver, The Max, and the Bemis Center for Contemporary Arts. Construction completed in 2015 with a total investment of $12,871,669.
13. 1501 Jackson – 75 units, this new construction is located across the street from the Max and the fire station. The building features heated parking and a Penthouse cyber cafe with views. Construction completed in 2015 with a total investment of $13,500,000.
14. The Barker – 48 units, this historical building was originally built in 1929. It is across the street from Sullivan's steakhouse, Jazz Louisiana Kitchen, and nearby the Hotel Deco XV which is one of the most upscale hotels in the city. Also on the same block is the former King Fong restaurant (opened in 1921, now closed) and Panda House. Construction completed in 2013 with a total investment of $9,300,000.
15. Highline 2.0 – 114 units, new structure at 2100 Douglas St will have indoor bicycle parking, exterior courtyard, and an outdoor swimming pool. Construction expected to be completed in Spring 2016 with a total investment of $16,700,000.
16. Traver's Row – 24 row houses, renovation of the historic Travers row houses on 26th & St. Mary's Ave. Units come in 2, 3, & 4 Bedrooms. Construction completed in 2015 with a total investment of $2,000,000.
17. Nichol Flats – 67 units in a new 5 story building on 16th and Nicholas. Modestly priced apartments near TD Ameritrade stadium and the Hot Shops arts building will have private balconies, ambient lighting, and stone and wood floors. Construction ongoing with a total investment of $9,177,000.
18. Woolworth Lofts – 43 units, rehab of a floors 3-5 of a building located on the northeast corner of 12 & Howard in the middle of the Old Market. Construction is expected to be completed in late 2016 with a total investment of $12,000,000.
19. Flats on Howard – 153 units, redevelopment of 12 adjacent brick buildings between Harney St and Landon Ct along 24th St. Development will include a courtyard, pet park, pet washing station, and a gated private parking lot. Construction completed in 2016 with a total investment of $20,000,000. In 2024, a new building was completed that added an additional 120 apartment units.
20. Hotel Flatiron – 30 apartments created after renovation of the unique and historic triangular shaped building on 17th and St Marys Ave. The project was announced in 2014 and completed in 2015.

=== Residential Developments 2020–2030 ===
1. The Brickline – at 389 units, this 20 acre mixed use apartment block is built on part of the land that was the campus of ConAgra. The block was finished in 2023. In 2022, the cost of the development was estimated to be $115 million.
2. The Duo – 700 units, the former office buildings called Central Park Plaza will be redeveloped into apartments that will be located on the new Omaha Streetcar line. The development is expected to be incremental, and completed in 2027 at a cost of $163 million.

== Attractions ==
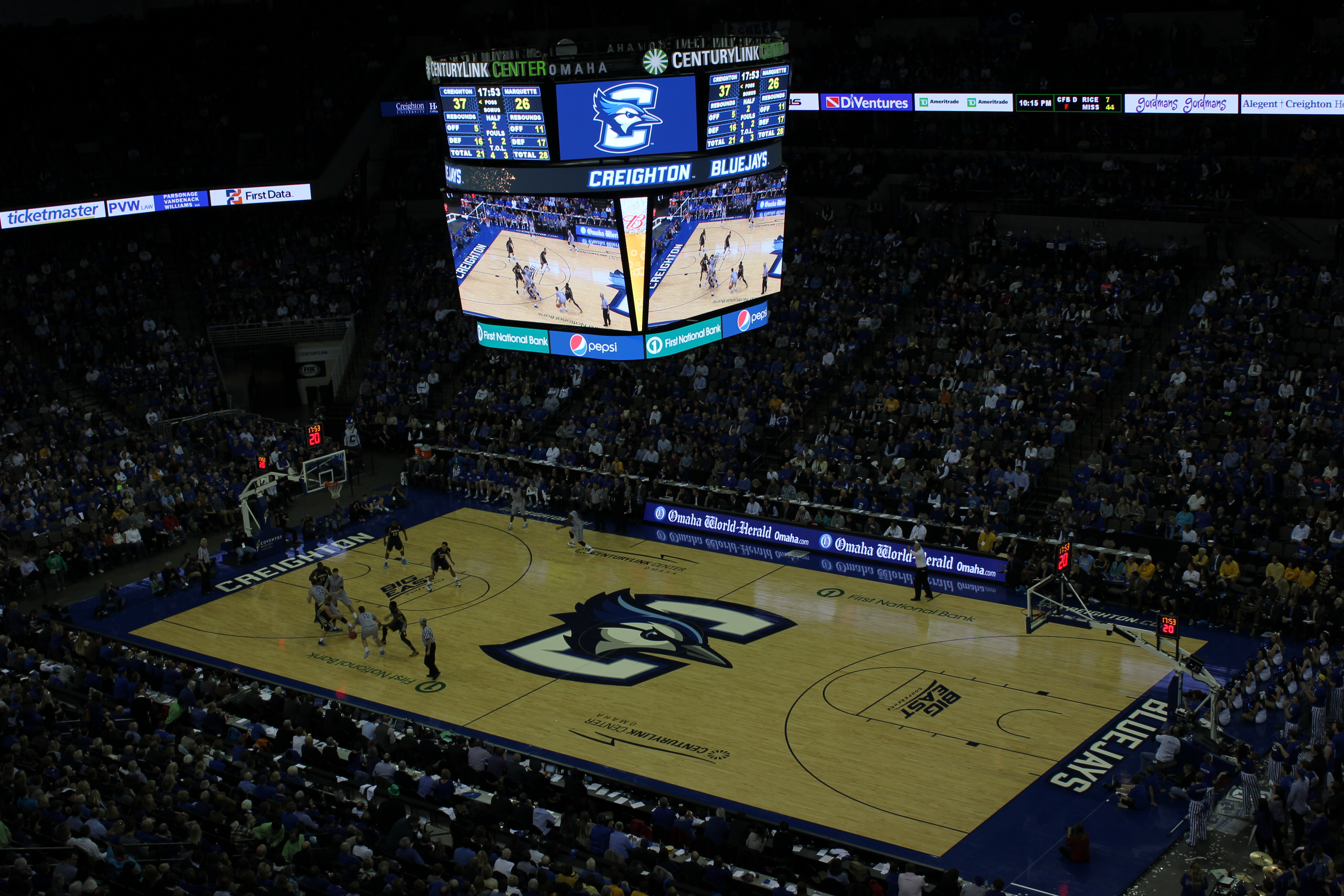
Basketball game at the CHI Health Center Omaha in downtown

Aside from the Old Market, other attractions in Downtown Omaha include the historic Orpheum Theater, which was built by influential Omaha philanthropist John A. Creighton, whose family also built the city's Creighton University. Along with the Rose Blumkin Performing Arts Center, this is the oldest theater left in downtown. Other performance spaces downtown include the Magic Theatre, which features experimental theater.

The Omaha Children's Museum, Durham Museum, and the Holland Performing Arts Center are all important visual arts spaces downtown, while the CenturyLink Center Omaha and the Omaha Civic Auditorium play host to many different events, including concerts, sports and more. Slowdown is a new cultural center that straddles the boundaries of NoDo and the Near North Side neighborhood.

Heartland of America Park and the Gene Leahy Mall play host to outdoor concerts and other events throughout the year.

== Architecture ==
Downtown Omaha was the original site of the city of Omaha, where the riverfront held businesses and the area surrounding it bore the brunt of its commercial, residential, and social activities. The Omaha National Bank Building was the first tower in downtown. Constructed in 1888 and 1889, the building was designed in the Renaissance Revival style by the New York architectural firm of McKim, Mead, and White. The firm designed an identical office tower for the New York Life Insurance Company in Kansas City, Missouri. The building was Omaha's first ten-story structure. There has been a recent revitalization of the area, with several notable new buildings and other developments taking place. Following are some of the notable locations throughout the area.

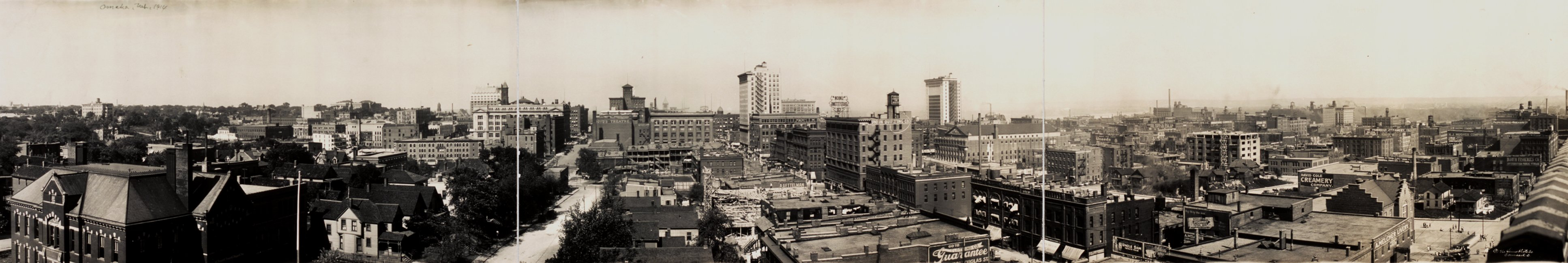
Downtown Omaha looking east from approximately North 30th and Farnam Streets.

=== Tallest buildings ===
Omaha's tallest building, the 45-story First National Bank Tower, is in Downtown.

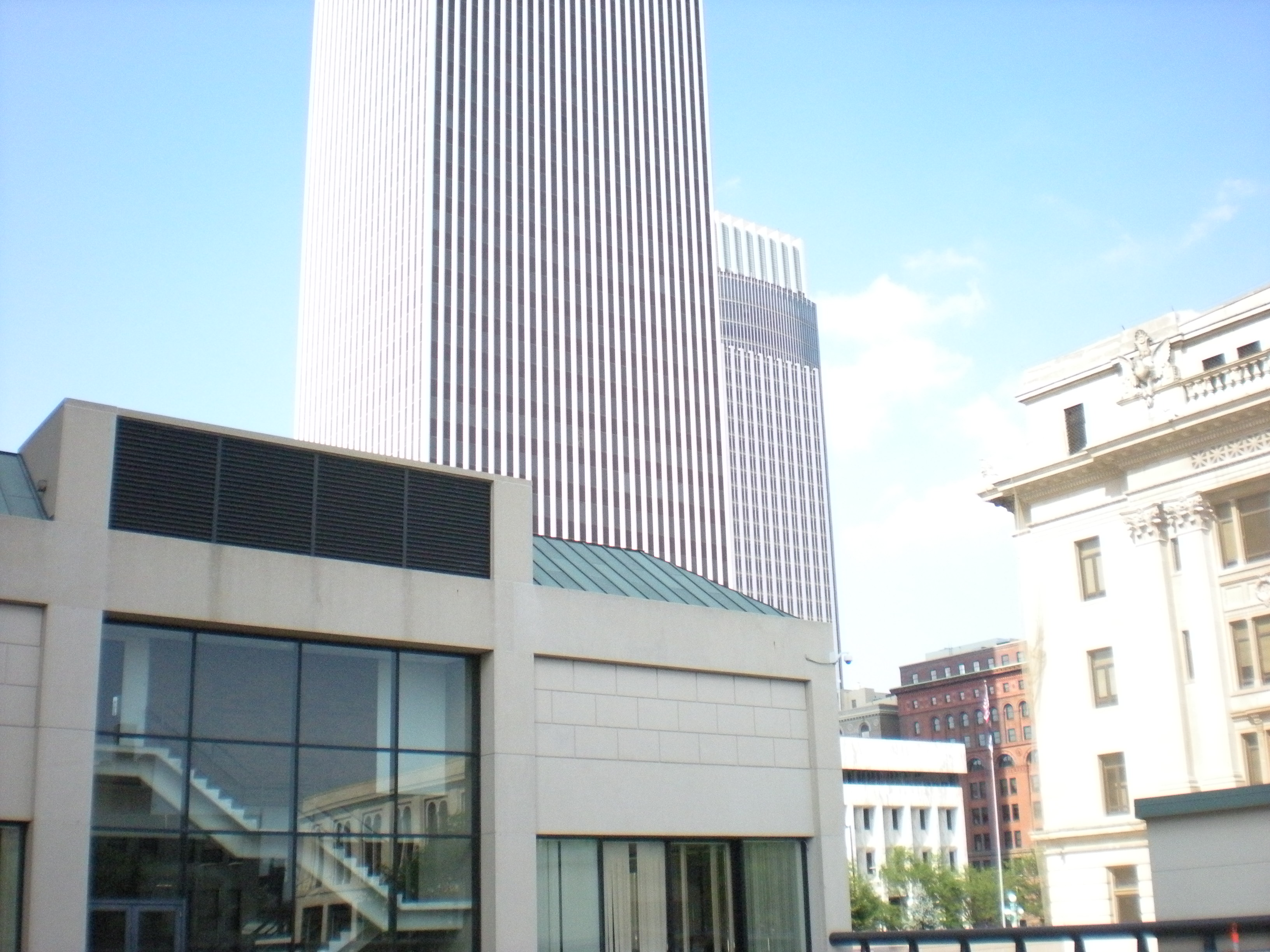
View from city hall plaza; buildings in view are Woodmen Tower, One First National Center, and the Omaha National Bank Building.

Tallest buildings in Downtown Omaha
Name	Location	Stories	Height
Mutual of Omaha Headquarters Tower	215 South 15th Street	44	677 ft (206 m)
One First National Center	1601 Dodge Street	45	634 ft (193 m)
Woodmen Tower	1805 Douglas Street	30	478 ft (146 m)
Union Pacific Center	1400 Douglas Street	19	317 ft (97 m)
First National Center	1620 Dodge Street	22	295 ft (90 m)
AT&T Building	116-124 South 19th Street	16	265 ft (81 m)
Northern Natural Gas Building	2233 Dodge Street	19	260 ft (79 m)
1200 Landmark Center	1299 Farnam Street	15	255 ft (78 m)
Omaha World Herald Building	1314 Douglas Street	16	250 ft (76 m)
Double Tree Hotel	1616 Dodge Street	19	237 ft (72 m)
City National Bank Building (Omaha)	411 South 16th Street	16	220 ft (67 m)

=== Historic districts ===
The Old Market Historic District is bordered by Farnam Street on the north to Leavenworth on the south, from South 10th Street on the east to South 14th Street on the west. The Omaha Rail and Commerce Historic District is bounded by Jackson, 15th and 8th Streets, as well as the Union Pacific main line. Both are also listed as historic districts on the National Register of Historic Places. Downtown Omaha is also the site of the largest single loss of buildings included on the National Register of Historic Places to date. All of the 24 buildings in the Jobbers Canyon were demolished in 1989, to be replaced by the ConAgra headquarters and Heartland of America Park. The Warehouses in Omaha Multiple Property Submission brings together several historic locations around Downtown Omaha, as well.

=== Historic buildings ===
According to a 1939 publication by the Federal Writers' Project, the downtown core has at least 23 historic sites that were central to the growth and development of the city. Many significant buildings have been recognized as landmarks, including the following, which are all included on the National Register of Historic Places.

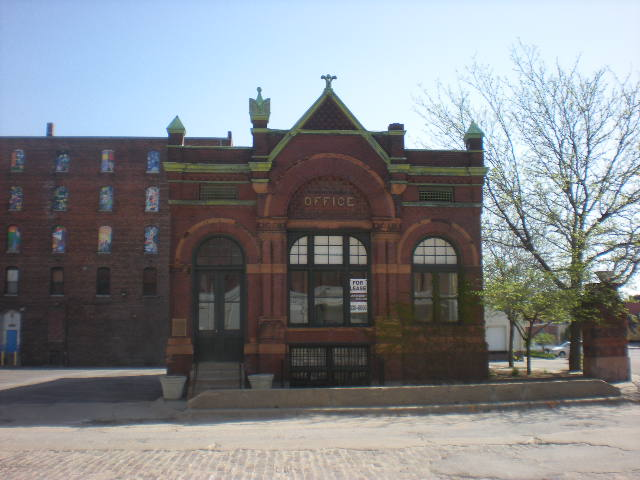
Anheuser-Busch Beer Depot in the Old Market Historic District with the Bemis Omaha Bag Company Building in the background

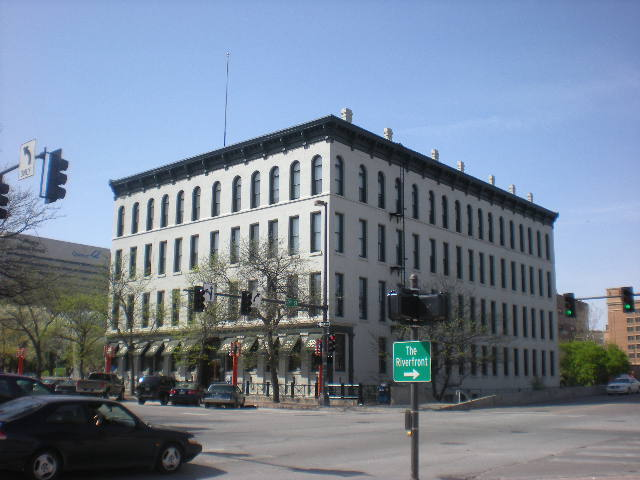
The Burlington Headquarters Building on the edge of the Old Market Historic District

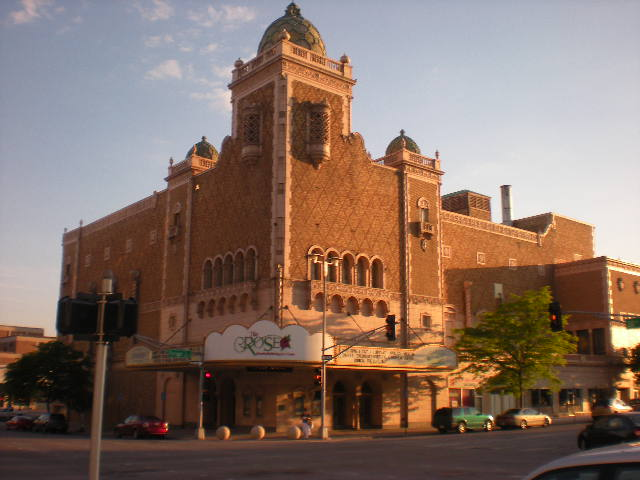
The Astro Theater, now known as The Rose Theater, is located in the Park East neighborhood of downtown.

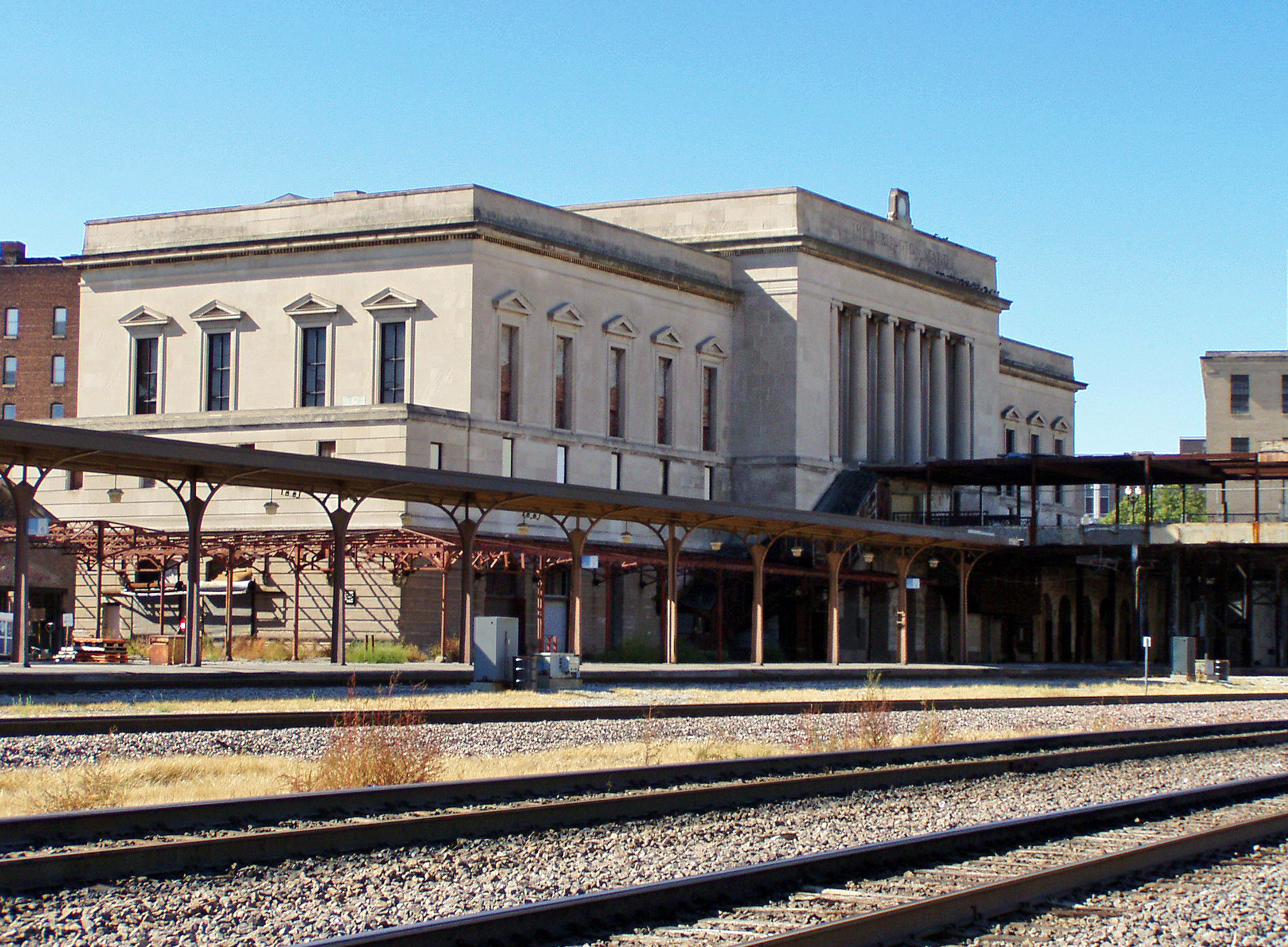
The Burlington Station, a contributing property to the Omaha Rail and Commerce Historic District in downtown Omaha

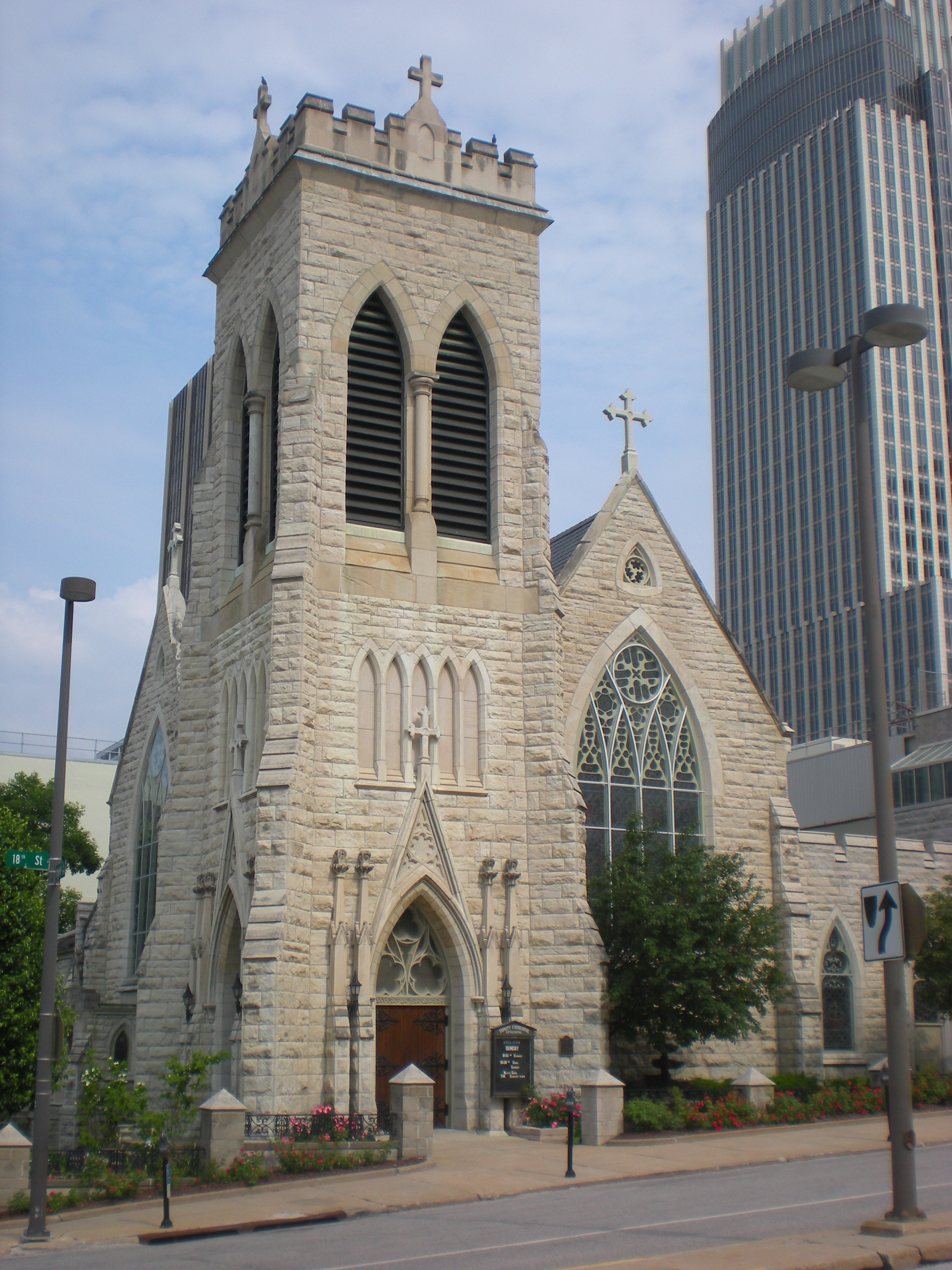
Trinity Cathedral is located downtown on 18th and Capital Avenue.

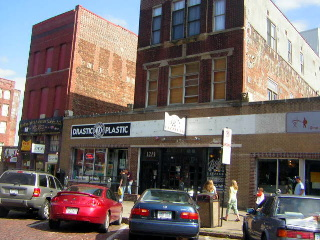
More businesses in downtown's Old Market

Historic buildings in Downtown Omaha
Place name	Location	Notes
Anheuser-Busch Beer Depot	1215 Jones Street	Built in 1916.
Ansonia Apartments		
Aquila Court Building	1615 Howard Street	Built in 1923.
Astro Theater	2001 Farnam Street	Built in 1926. Opened as The Riviera Theater, today is it called the Rose Blumkin Performing Arts Center or simply The Rose.
Beebe and Runyan Furniture Showroom and Warehouse	105 South 9th Street	Built in 1913.
Bemis Omaha Bag Company Building	614-624 South 11th Street	Built in 1887.
Broatch Building		
Burlington Headquarters Building	1004 Farnam Street	Built in 1879.
Burlington Station	925 South 10th Street	Built in 1898.
City National Bank Building (Omaha)	405 S 16th St	Built in 1910.
Douglas County Courthouse	1819 Farnam Street	Built in 1908, this site was labeled a key historic site by the Federal Writers' Project.
Eggerss-O'Flyng Building	801 South 15th Street	Built in 1902.
Farnam Building	1613 Farnam Street	Built in 1929.
Federal Office Building	110 South 15th Street	Built in 1934.
First National Bank Building	300-312 South 16th Street	1917.
Flatiron Hotel	1722 St. Mary's Avenue	Built in 1914.
Florentine Apartments		
G.C. Moses Block	1234-1244 South 13th Street	Built in 1887.
Goodrich Building	1415 Farnam Street	Built in 1900
Hill Hotel	505 South 16th Street	Built in 1919.
Horbach Building	1205-1207 Harney Street	Built in 1894; this building currently houses Vincenzo's Italian Ristorante
Hospe Music Warehouse	109-111 South 10th Street	Built in 1919.
J.L. Brandeis and Sons Store Building	200 South 16 Street	Built in 1906.
Keeline Building	319 South 17th Street	Built in 1911.
Kennedy Building		
Kimball House		
Mason School	1012 South 24th Street	Built in 1888
Nash Block	902-912 Farnam Street	Built in 1905.
Omaha Bolt, Nut and Screw Building	1316 Jones Street	Built in 1889.
Omaha Central High School	124 North 20th Street	Built in 1912, the Capitol Hill site was labeled a key historic site by the Federal Writers' Project.
Old Omaha Public Library building	1823 Harney Street	The original location of the Omaha Public Library was built in 1891.
Omaha National Bank Building	1650 Farnam Street	Built in 1889, this site was labeled a key historic site by the Federal Writers' Project.
Orpheum Theater	409 South 16th Street	Built between 1892 and 1927
Parlin, Orendorff and Martin Plow Company Building		
Paxton Hotel	1403 Farnam Street	Original building constructed 1882 was demolished and rebuilt to current building in 1928
Poppleton Block	1001 Farnam Street	Built in 1890.
Redick Tower	1504 Harney Street	Built in 1930.
Rose Realty-Securities Building	305 South 16th Street	Built in 1916.
Sanford Hotel	1913 Farnam Street	Constructed in 1913.
Simon Brothers Company	1024 Dodge Street	This building was constructed in 1919.
Christian Specht Building	1110 Douglas Street	Built in 1884, this building barely survived destruction in 2007.
Standard Oil Company Building of Nebraska	500 South 18th Street	
Steiner Rowhouses		
Trinity Cathedral (Omaha, Nebraska)	113 North 18th St	Built in 1880
Union State Bank Building		
Union Station	801 South 10th Street	Built in 1931, it currently houses the Durham Museum.

=== Former locations ===
The location of the William D. Brown's Lone Tree Ferry, downtown has been the pivotal site for Omaha's growth since the city's inception in 1854. The following are all buildings, districts and other notable locations in Omaha that have been lost over the last 150 years.

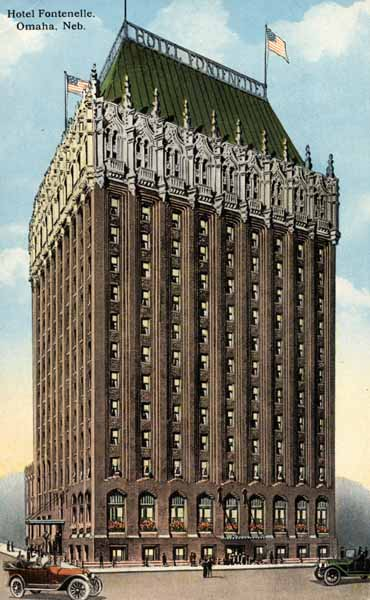
Gene Eppley's Hotel Fontenelle

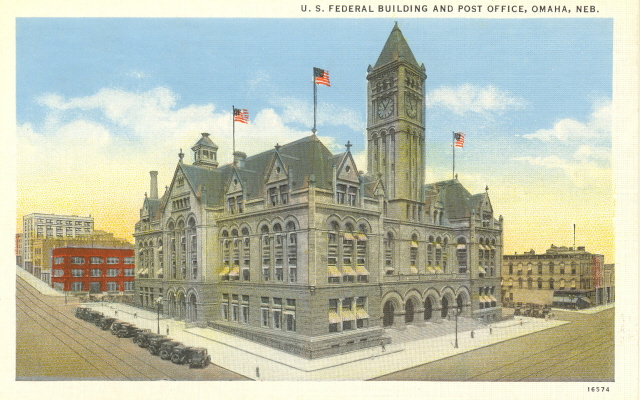
The 1898 Omaha Post Office

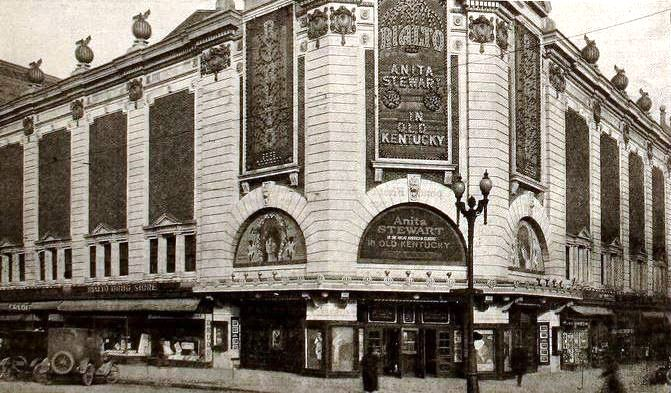
Rialto Theater circa 1919

Former locations in Downtown Omaha
Name	Location	Notes
Bee Building	17th and Farnam	Built in 1888 and demolished in 1966, along with the Old City Hall, this site was labeled a key historic site by the Federal Writers' Project.
Boyd's Theater and Opera House	1621 Harney Street	Built in 1891, this building was razed in 1920 to make space for the expanded Burgess-Nash Department store.
Douglas Building	19th and Douglas Streets	Originally the Masonic Temple, this 1918 building was demolished in 1997, this site was labeled a key historic site by the Federal Writers' Project.
Douglas House	13th and Harney Streets	Built in 1854, this site was labeled a key historic site by the Federal Writers' Project.
Emergency Hospital	912 Douglas Street	Built in the 1870s for Madam Anna Wilson as a brothel, this building was made into a hospital in the 1890s and demolished in the 1940s, and was labeled a key historic site by the Federal Writers' Project.
First Methodist Episcopal Church	20th and Davenport Streets	Built in 1891, this building burnt down in 1954.
George W. Lininger Residence	18th and Davenport Streets	Built in the late 1860s, this widely regarded architectural treasure was demolished in the 1930s.
Grand Central Hotel	14th and Farnam Street	Built in 1873, this building was demolished in 1878.
Grand Opera House	15th and Davenport Streets	Built in 1885 this edifice burnt down in 1894.
Herndon House	9th and Farnam Streets	Built in 1858 by George L. Miller, this building was a premier hotel in pioneer Omaha, and was used as the Union Pacific headquarters for 50 years.
Hotel Fontenelle	1806 Douglas Street	Designed by Thomas Rogers Kimball and built in 1914, it was demolished in 1983.
Jefferson Square	Bounded by 15th, 16th, Farnam and Douglas Streets	Dedicated November 25, 1865, it was razed by the city March 18, 1969. The first park in Omaha, it was the location of the first school and hot air balloon in Omaha.
Jobbers Canyon	Bound by Farnam Street, South Eighth Street, Jackson Street, and South Tenth Street.	Built up from the 1860s, the entirety of the area was demolished in 1989.
Lone Tree Ferry	Port of Omaha	Established in 1850 by William D. Brown, the original impetus for founding Omaha became the Council Bluffs & Nebraska Ferry Company in 1853.
Medical Arts Building	17th and Dodge Streets	This Thomas R. Kimball design was constructed in 1926 and demolished in 1999.
Old Post Office	16th and Dodge Streets	Built in 1898, the building was demolished in 1966, this site was labeled a key historic site by the Federal Writers' Project.
Old City Hall	18th and Farnam Streets.	Completed in 1890, the building was demolished 1966.
Omaha Athletic Club	1714 Douglas Street	This John Latenser, Sr. building was constructed in 1918 and demolished in 1992, and was labeled a key historic site by the Federal Writers' Project.
Rialto Theater	1424 Douglas Street	This John Latenser, Sr. building was constructed in 1918 and demolished in 1986.
St. Mary's Academy	2236 St Mary's Avenue	Originally built in 1864
St. Nicholas Hotel	Near 12th and Jackson	
The Omaha House	2002 Douglas Street	Built in 1895, this building was demolished in 1965.
Union Pacific Shops	9th and Webster Streets	Receiving its first cars in 1865, this facility was demolished in phases starting in 1988, and is now the site of the Qwest Center Omaha.
Woodmen of the World Building	1323 Farnam Street	Built in 1912, the Woodmen of the World leased office space there until 1934 when they relocated to the Insurance Building. The building was demolished in 1978.
World Theater	1506 Douglas Street	Built in 1922, it was renamed the Omaha Theater in 1935. The building was demolished in 1980.

Other sites labeled as key historic sites by the Federal Writers' Project include the Douglas Street Bridge, Herndon House, First Territorial Capitol, Diamond Gambling House, Original Union Pacific Headquarters, Joslyn Memorial, Original World-Herald Building, Apex Saloon, Omaha Auditorium and the Union Passenger Terminal.

== Transportation ==
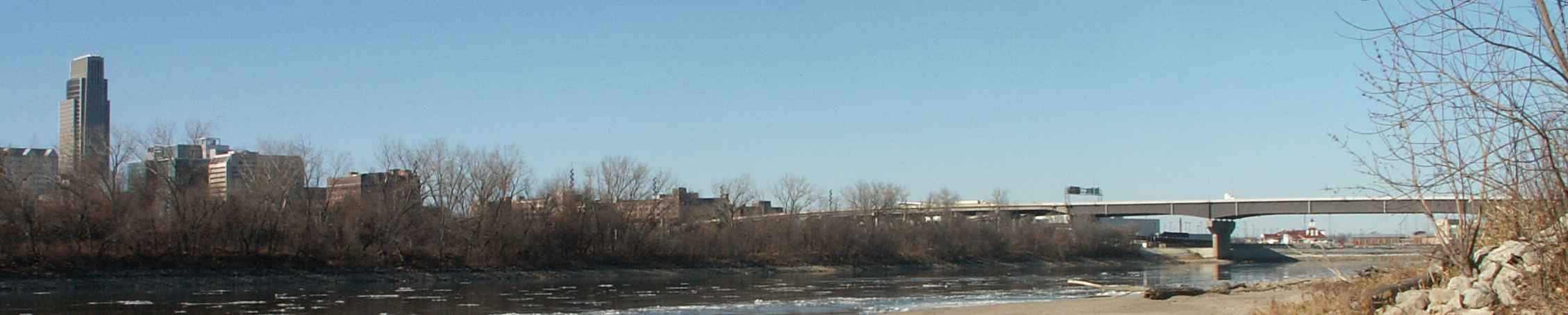
The I-480 bridge over the Missouri River between Council Bluffs, Iowa, and Downtown Omaha, Nebraska

Omaha's main east–west street, Dodge Street begins downtown as a westbound one-way offramp from I-480 right after it crosses the Missouri River from Iowa. This route of the former Lincoln Highway in Omaha includes several buildings listed on the National Register of Historic Places, including the Kirschbraun and Sons Creamery, Inc. at 901 Dodge Street, The Logan at 1804 Dodge Street, and the Simon Brothers Company at 1024 Dodge Street. The street was once lined by the Old Post Office. Accommodating U.S. 6 it conjoins with Douglas Street at 30th Street to hold six lanes of two-way traffic.

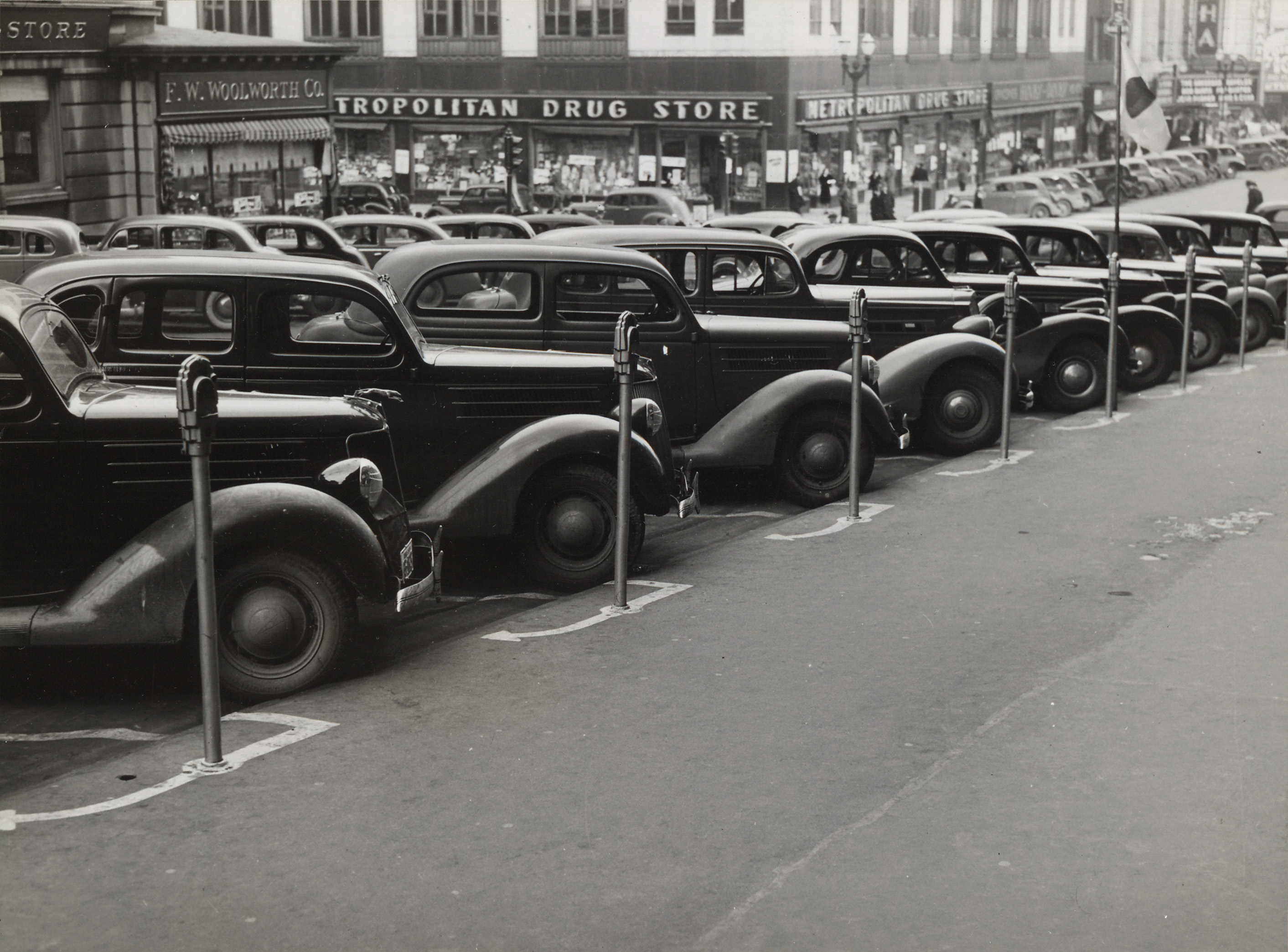
The Woolworth's Store in Downtown Omaha in 1938

The City of Omaha is considering developing a light rail system that would extend from NoDo to the Rosenblatt Stadium/Henry Doorly Zoo area in South Omaha. The historical Omaha port site was located in downtown, with dozens of businesses lining the riverside to serve the steamboats and other water traffic. Jobbers Canyon was originally built here to accommodate river traffic. That same area today is home to Miller's Landing, which is a riverboat excursion launching site, and the new Missouri River Pedestrian Bridge that will take walkers to Council Bluffs.

Downtown has been the location of the Union Pacific Railroad headquarters since its founding in 1865; they constructed a bridge, shops and a station downtown for their traffic. In 1989 the railroad combined all of its nationwide operational coordination into the rehabilitated 1892 Harriman Dispatch Center; in 2002 they opened a new headquarters building downtown as well. In a similar fashion, the Burlington and Missouri River Railroad built their headquarters in downtown in 1879, with renowned Omaha architect Thomas R. Kimball redesigning the building extensively in 1899. That company's depot in the downtown area was recently rehabilitated for use as high-end condominiums.

== Environmental concerns ==
In 1889 ASARCO, a smelting company, consolidated several plants at the corner of 5th & Douglas Streets in Downtown Omaha. By 1915 it was the largest lead refinery in the world. In 1972 the plant was found to be releasing high amounts of lead into the air and ground surrounding the plant, and in 1995 ASARCO submitted a demolition and site cleanup plan to the Nebraska Department of Environmental Quality. The company was fined $3.6 million in 1996 for discharging lead and other pollutants into the Missouri River, and the plant was closed in July, 1997. After extensive cleanup the land was turned over to the City of Omaha for use as a 23-acre (93,000 m^{2}) park. All of North Omaha, comprising more than 8,000 acres (3,200 ha), was declared a Superfund site, and as of 2003, 290 acres (120 ha) had been cleaned.

== See also ==
- List of businesses in Omaha
- Culture in Omaha
- Music in Omaha

== Related publications ==
- Bednarek, J.R.D. (1992) The Changing Image of the City: Planning for Downtown Omaha, 1945-1973. University of Nebraska Press.
- Adrian, J.C. Jr. (2006) Downtown Revitalization: Parks in the Sky. Theses from the Architecture Program. Architecture Program at University of Nebraska - Lincoln.
- Beals, J. "Magic Number: Third stage in downtown Omaha development charging ahead", Omaha City Weekly. Retrieved 8/21/07.
