= Scoular (surname) =

Scoular is a surname. Notable people with the name are:

- Angela Scoular (1945–2011), British actress
- George Scoular (1858–1930), businessman; namesake of Scoular and Scoular Building
- Iain Scoular (born c.1958), Scottish killer
- Jimmy Scoular (1925–1998), Scottish football player
- John Scoular (1885–1953), Scotland international rugby union player
