= Freedom Center (Omaha) =

Newspaper production facility in Nebraska, United States

Coordinates: 41°15′41″N 95°56′02″W

John Gottschalk Freedom Center
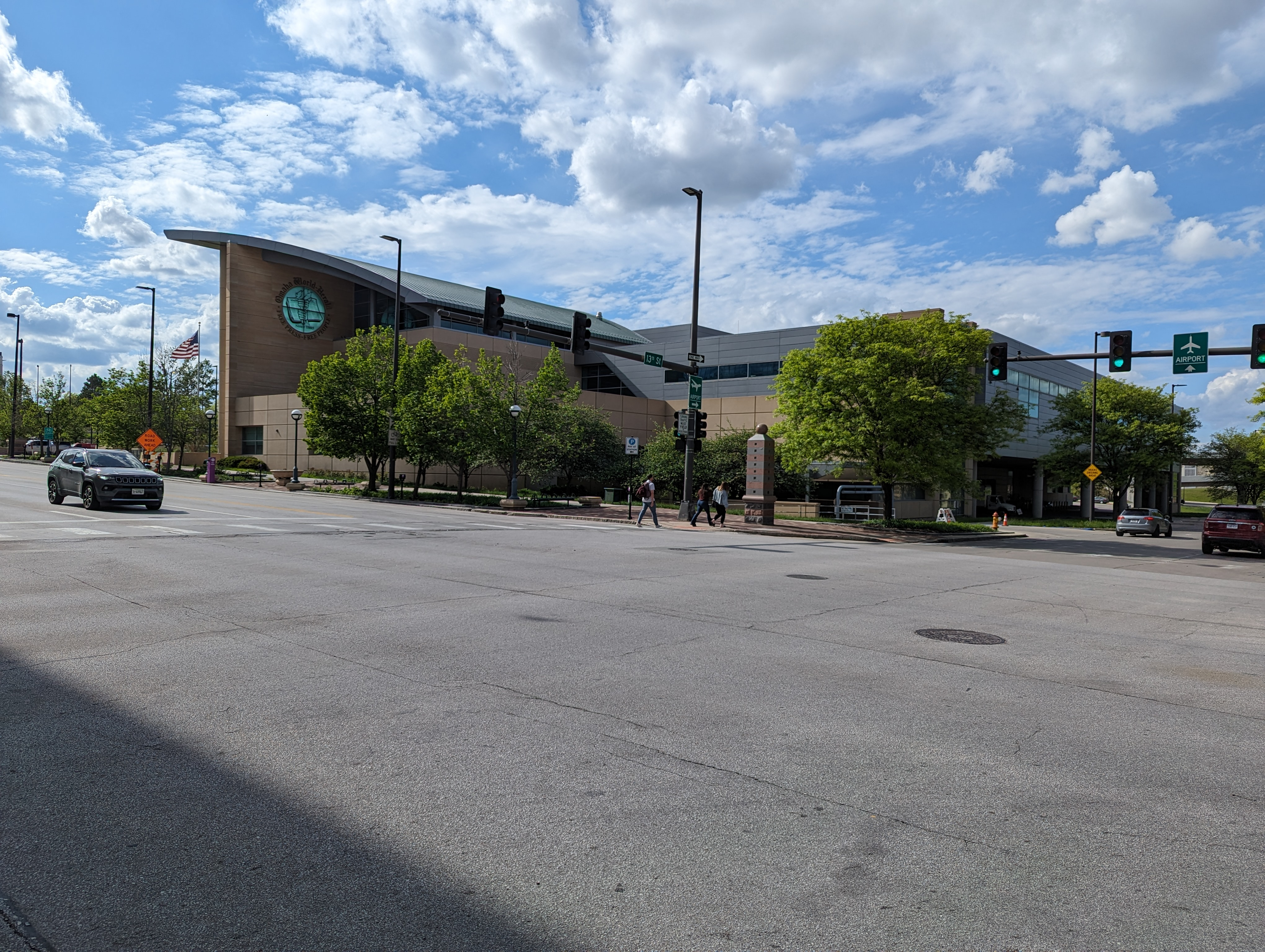
- Printing plant for the Omaha World-Herald, completed in 2001
- Interactive map of the John Gottschalk Freedom Center area

General information
- Type: Production facility
- Architectural style: Modern
- Location: Omaha, Nebraska
- Completed: August 31, 2001
- Owner: Omaha World-Herald

Design and construction
- Architect: HDR, Inc.

The John Gottschalk Freedom Center is a newspaper production facility located at 14th Street and Capitol Avenue in Downtown Omaha, Nebraska. Built for the Omaha World-Herald, the building is considered to be one of the most automated and technologically advanced newspaper facilities in the world. The Freedom Center has been labeled a "catalyst" in the redevelopment of Downtown Omaha, along with such other new downtown development as the opening of the Missouri riverfront, the First National Bank Building, the CHI Health Center Omaha and the Gallup University campus. The facility covers four blocks, and houses the new shaftless printing presses, material handling center, assembly equipment, and a parking garage.

In 2026 it was announced that the facility would close, and that the World-Herald would instead contract its printing to a USA Today Co. owned facility in Des Moines.

== Design ==
The facility was opened in August 2001, and cost almost $125 million to build. It consists of three structures designed by HDR, Inc. They include a five-level, 321,000-square-foot (29,800 m^{2}) press hall featuring 3 MAN Roland presses from Germany; a 20,000-square-foot (1,900 m^{2}) paper-storage facility capable of storing 3,000 rolls of newsprint and a 600-stall parking garage. Large portions of the exterior are glass, allowing downtown traffic to see the storage facility and presses.

The storage facility/press hall is connected by a tunnel than runs underneath 13th Street. Most newspaper facilities of this size have been built on greenfield sites. The Omaha World-Herald was dedicated to keeping its newspaper facilities downtown, which required a more vertical structure, and the tunnel. Transfer Vehicle System (TVS) robotic vehicles are used to deliver newsprint to the press.

The presses weigh 1,661 U.S. tons and can produce 75,000 newspapers per hour. The John Gottschalk Freedom Center produces four editions of the Omaha World-Herald daily, in addition to a Sunday edition and daily editions of the Daily NonPareil for neighboring Southwest Iowa.

Construction of the modern facility served as the impetus for redesigning the layout of the actual newspaper.
