= Douglas House (Omaha) =

Coordinates: 41°15′23″N 95°56′00″W

- Interactive map of the Douglas House area

General information
- Location: Omaha, Nebraska, United States
- Construction started: 1854
- Completed: 1854
- Demolished: After 1883

The Douglas House was the second hotel in Omaha, Nebraska. Located in present-day Downtown Omaha on the southwest corner of 13th and Harney Streets, the hotel housed influential politicians, speculators, and the first court trial in the Nebraska Territory. A two-story frame structure, it supplemented the earlier St. Nicholas Hotel.

== History ==
Built in the fall of 1854 by David Lindley, the building used wood-frame construction and was reported to be primitive in accommodations and "completely inadequate as sleeping comfort and the necessities of life were concerned." For several years the dining room had no floor and tables were made of rough cut cottonwood boards supported by poles driven into the ground, with beds made of bed sheets stuffed with prairie grass.

The hotel became the city's first post office in 1855, only to be usurped by a new dry goods store called the Big Six. On July 4, 1855, Omaha's first ball was held at the Douglas House, along with a barbecue to celebrate the first anniversary of the city's founding. Efforts to enfranchise the women of Nebraska date to as early as 1855 when suffragist Amelia Bloomer spoke before an audience at the Douglas House.

Local missionaries were invited to hold services at the House in 1856, after the original Nebraska Territory state house was sold. The churches included Methodists, Congregationalists, Baptists and Episcopalians. In 1861 the hotel housed six patients during a smallpox outbreak.

The building still stood in 1883.

== See also ==
- History of Omaha
