= Farnam Building =

- U.S. National Register of Historic Places
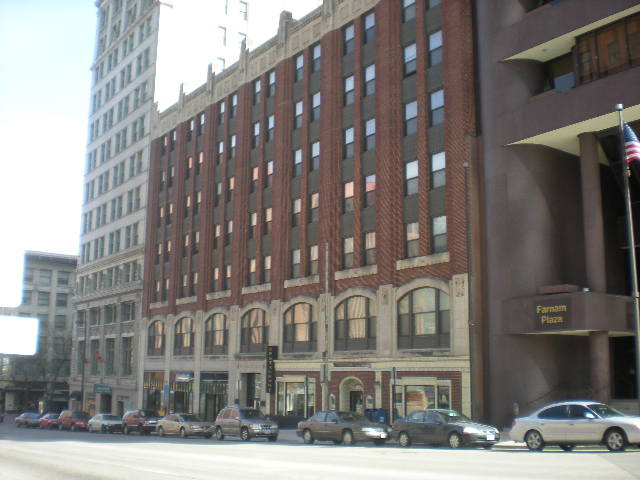
- Farnam Building, view from 17th and Farnam

- Location within Nebraska Location within the United States
- Location: 1613 Farnam Street, Omaha, Nebraska
- Coordinates: 41°15′27″N 95°56′16″W
- Built: 1929
- Architect: George B. Prinz
- Architectural style: Gothic Revival
- NRHP reference No.: 00000171
- Added to NRHP: March 9, 2000

The Farnam Building is located in Downtown Omaha, Nebraska. It is a seven-story, 110-foot-tall (34 m), historic building that was constructed in 1929. It is adjacent to the First National Bank Building to the east, and Farnam Plaza, an eight-story building that houses the Opera Omaha offices, to the west.

The building had been important fixture in Omaha's downtown business community since the 1930s. Northup-Jones restaurant was located on the first level and was frequented by Omaha's financial and lawyer community.

The building was renovated in 2000, and was converted from office space to 30 two- and three-bedroom residential apartments. The first floor is commercial space and contains two restaurants and a post office.
