= Burlington Headquarters Building =

Historic building in Omaha, Nebraska, U.S.

- U.S. National Register of Historic Places
- Omaha Landmark
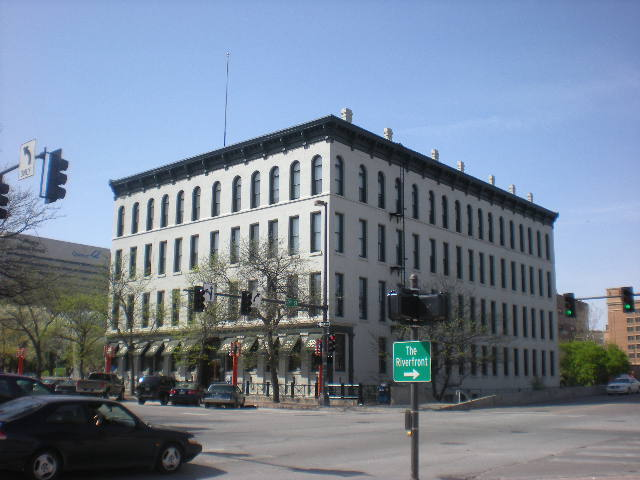
- Burlington Headquarters Building in 2010
- Location: Omaha, Nebraska, U.S.
- Coordinates: 41.25790859527587°N 95.92957365036052°W
- Built: 1879 and 1899
- Architect: Alfred R. Dufrene/Thomas R. Kimball (redesign)
- Architectural style: Italianate
- NRHP reference No.: 74001109

Significant dates
- Added to NRHP: December 4, 1974
- Designated OMAL: October 17, 1978

The Burlington Headquarters Building, also called Burlington Place, is located at 1004 Farnam Street in Downtown Omaha, Nebraska. This four-story brick building was originally designed by Alfred R. Dufrene and built in 1879 next to Jobbers Canyon. It was redesigned by noted Omaha architect Thomas R. Kimball in 1899, and vacated by the railroad in 1966. The building was listed on the National Register of Historic Places in 1974, designated an Omaha Landmark in 1978, and rehabilitated in 1983. Today it is office space.

== History ==
The Burlington Headquarters Building was built in the late 1870s and officially opened in 1879. It opened as the new headquarters for Burlington and Missouri River Railroad. The building was originally designed by A.R. Dufrene and was three stories tall. A fourth floor was added to the building in 1886. The building underwent extensive remodeling efforts in 1899, which were designed by Thomas R. Kimball.

Burlington moved its headquarters out of the building in 1966. The building was listed on the National Register of Historic Places in 1974. In 1976, the city purchased the building during the development of Gene Leahy Mall. It was announced that the building would be salvaged and be converted for commercial purposes. Renovation of the building was completed in February 1983 and re-branded to Burlington Place.

== Architecture ==
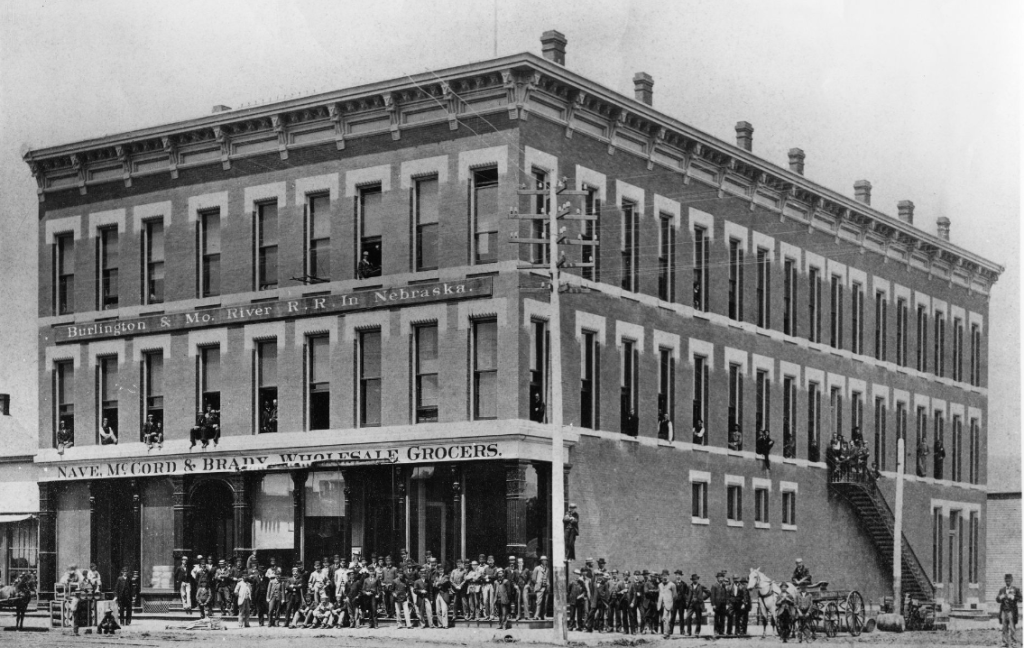
The Burlington Headquarters Building as it appeared in 1882

When the building was completed in 1879, it was designed in the Italianate style and had three floors. Constructed with load-bearing masonry walls on a foundation of limestone blocks, the building had a flat roof, straight front and walls, and very little embellishment that made it indistinguishable from its neighbors in the Jobbers Canyon. When the fourth floor was added in 1886, it had arched windows and a heavy ornamental cornice.

The 1899 redesign by Thomas Rogers Kimball closely resembled the Chicago, Burlington and Quincy Railroad Company Building in Chicago. The remodeled building's features include a combination of skylights, cast iron railings, staircases, columns, and ornamental detailing. Additionally, a central atrium and an open staircase with galleries overlooking a courtyard. The building was later converted into office space in 1983, with many of the original elements, including the stairway and balconies, remaining. Part of the original cast-iron Farnam Street facade remains. The building is located in Gene Leahy Mall.

== See also ==
- Railroads in Omaha
- Burlington Station
