= Flatiron Hotel =

- U.S. National Register of Historic Places
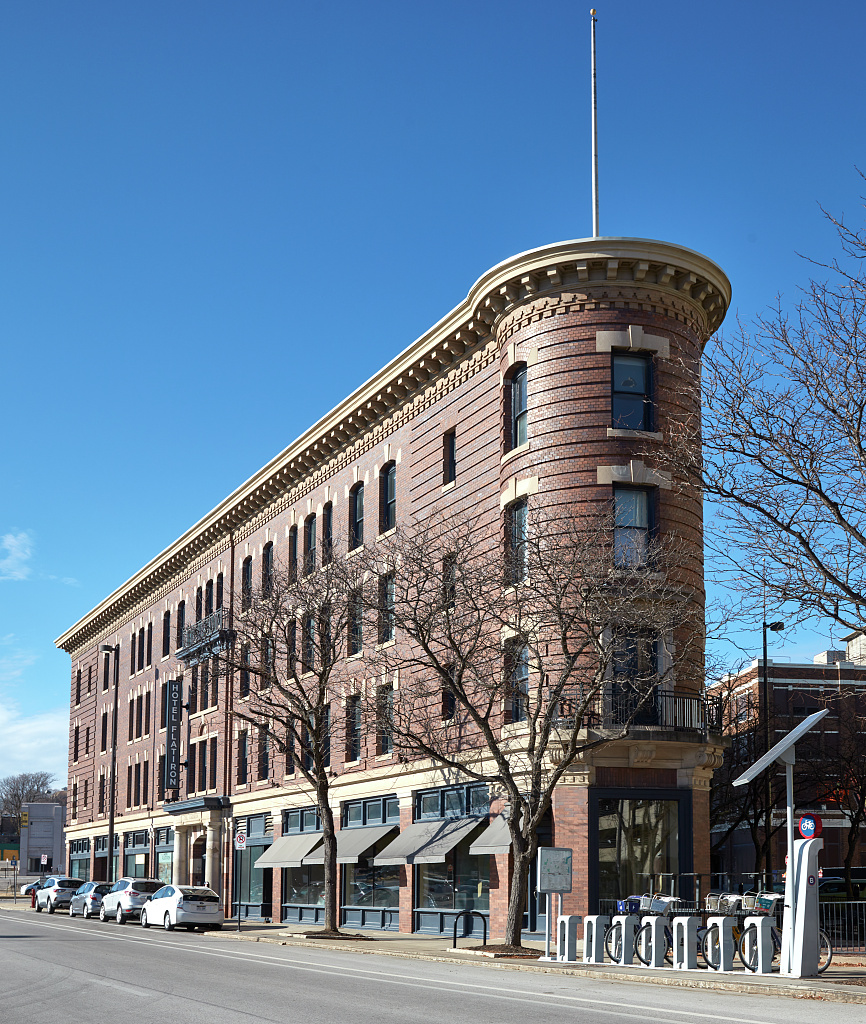
- View near the junction of St. Mary's Ave and Howard St

- Location within Nebraska Location within the United States
- Location: 1722 St. Mary's Avenue, Omaha, Nebraska
- Coordinates: 41°15′19.2″N 95°56′22.1″W
- Built: 1912
- Architectural style: Georgian Revival
- NRHP reference No.: 78003403
- Added to NRHP: 1978

The Flatiron Hotel is located at 1722 St. Mary's Avenue in downtown Omaha, Nebraska. Designed by architect George Prinz and originally constructed in 1912 as an office building, in 1914 it was renovated for use as a hotel. Today the building serves as office and commercial space. It formerly housed an upscale restaurant, the Flatiron Cafe, which closed in 2022. The Flatiron Hotel was added to the National Register of Historic Places in 1987.

== About ==
Drawing upon the original Flatiron Building in New York City, Augustus F. Kountze, a local banker and landowner, had the building erected as commercial and office space in 1912. The building, designed in the Georgian Revival style, is one of Omaha's most distinctive buildings. It has four stories with a circular tower at the point of the triangle, and is highlighted by decorative brickwork. There is limestone trim around the entire building, with a brown brick exterior on the whole building.

== In popular culture ==
In the novel Kings of Broken Things by Theodore Wheeler, the Flatiron Hotel is the site of a criminal scheme to dig secret tunnels that connect reputable hotels to brothels. The novel depicts several criminal endeavors connected to noted crime and political boss Tom Dennison.

== See also ==
- Landmarks in Omaha
- List of buildings named Flatiron Building
