= Grand Central Hotel (Omaha, Nebraska) =

Hotel in Omaha, Nebraska, United States

Coordinates: 41.25756°N 95.93443°W

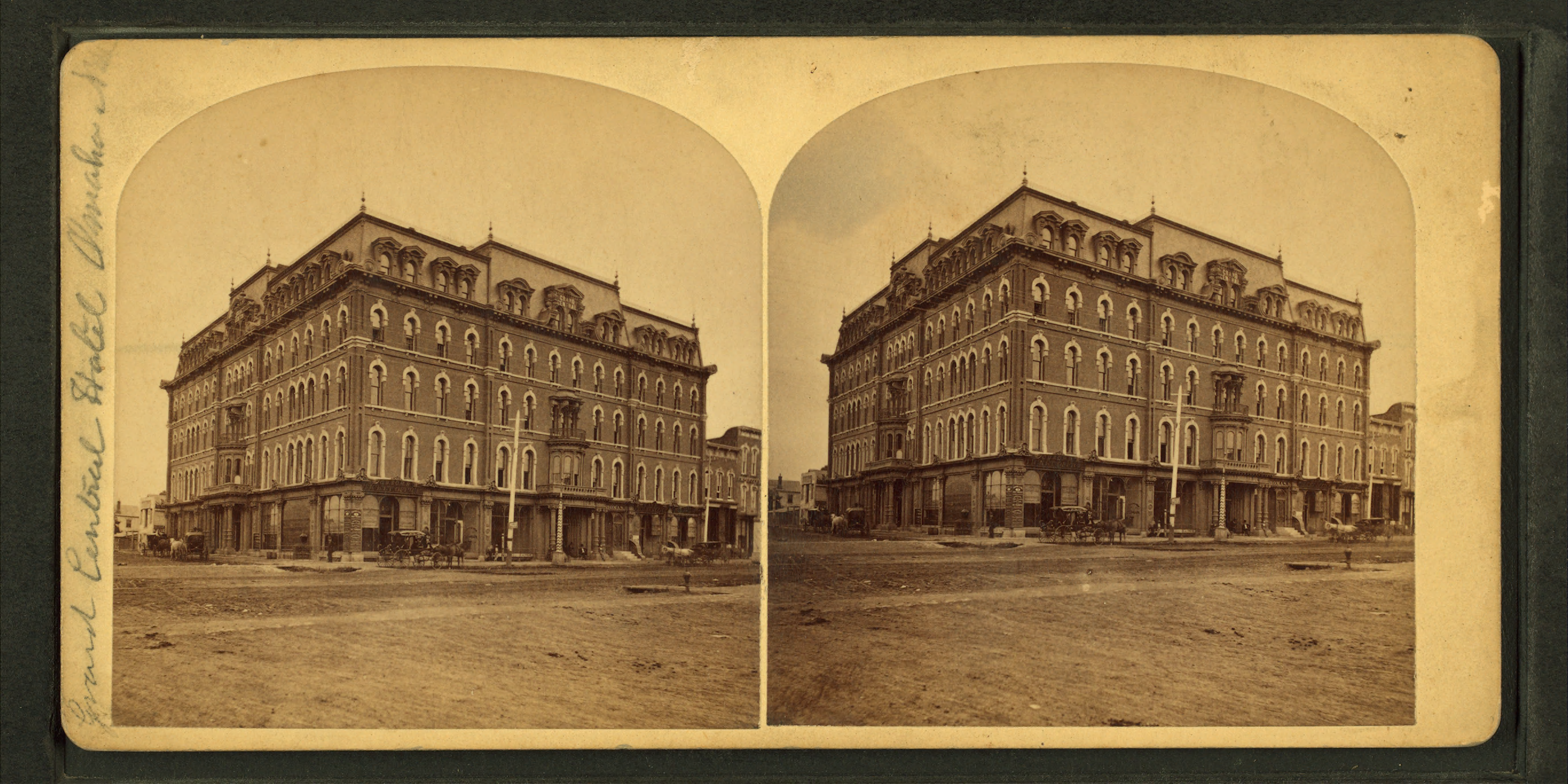
- Interactive map of the Grand Central Hotel area

General information
- Location: Omaha, Nebraska, United States
- Construction started: 1870
- Completed: 1873
- Destroyed: 1878

The Grand Central Hotel was an early hotel establishment formerly located at 14th and Farnam Streets in downtown Omaha, Nebraska. The Grand Central was built as Omaha's premier lodging after the Herndon House became the Union Pacific Headquarters.

== History ==
After the Herndon House was converted to the Union Pacific Headquarters, Omaha had no large hotel. To alleviate the situation, a syndicate was formed to raise $130,000 to erect the Grand Central Hotel. Construction was begun in 1870, but halted with only the walls and roof complete when funds were exhausted. It sat unfinished for nearly two years. Another syndicate raised the additional funds needed to complete the hotel. When it finally opened in 1873, advertisements claimed the Grand Central to be "the largest and best hotel between Chicago and San Francisco." The building sat on limestone foundation and architectural details included limestone lintels and sills, and a mansard roof. The interior details included fireplaces, imported chandeliers and mirrors.

The hotel almost immediately ran into financial difficulties. In 1878, a $100,000 mortgage was foreclosed. On August 18, 1878, the hotel was bought at auction by Augustus Kountze. George Thrall then leased the hotel from Kountze and assumed its management. In the summer of 1878, the Kitchen Brothers took over the lease and began extensive renovations, including the installation of an elevator. On the evening of September 4, 1878 a fire broke out. Five firefighters died battling the fire that ultimately destroyed the hotel. It was later determined that an unattended candle left by a careless worker had caused the fire.

The Grand Central Hotel catastrophe proved to be the impetus that moved Omaha’s fire department from volunteer to professional status.

In 1882 the original Paxton Hotel was built on the site as a replacement hotel for the city.

== Gallery ==
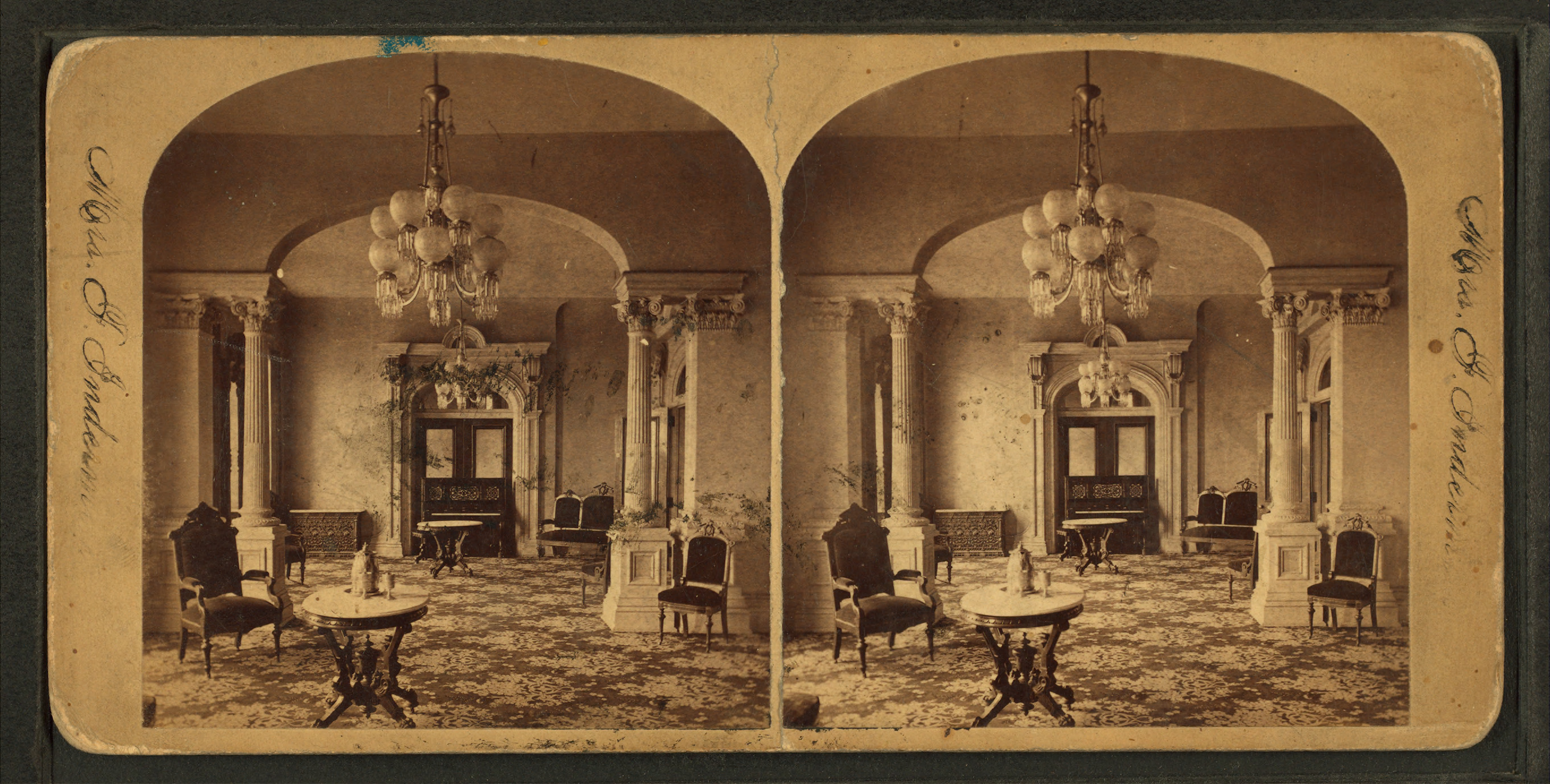
Entry parlor at the Grand Central.

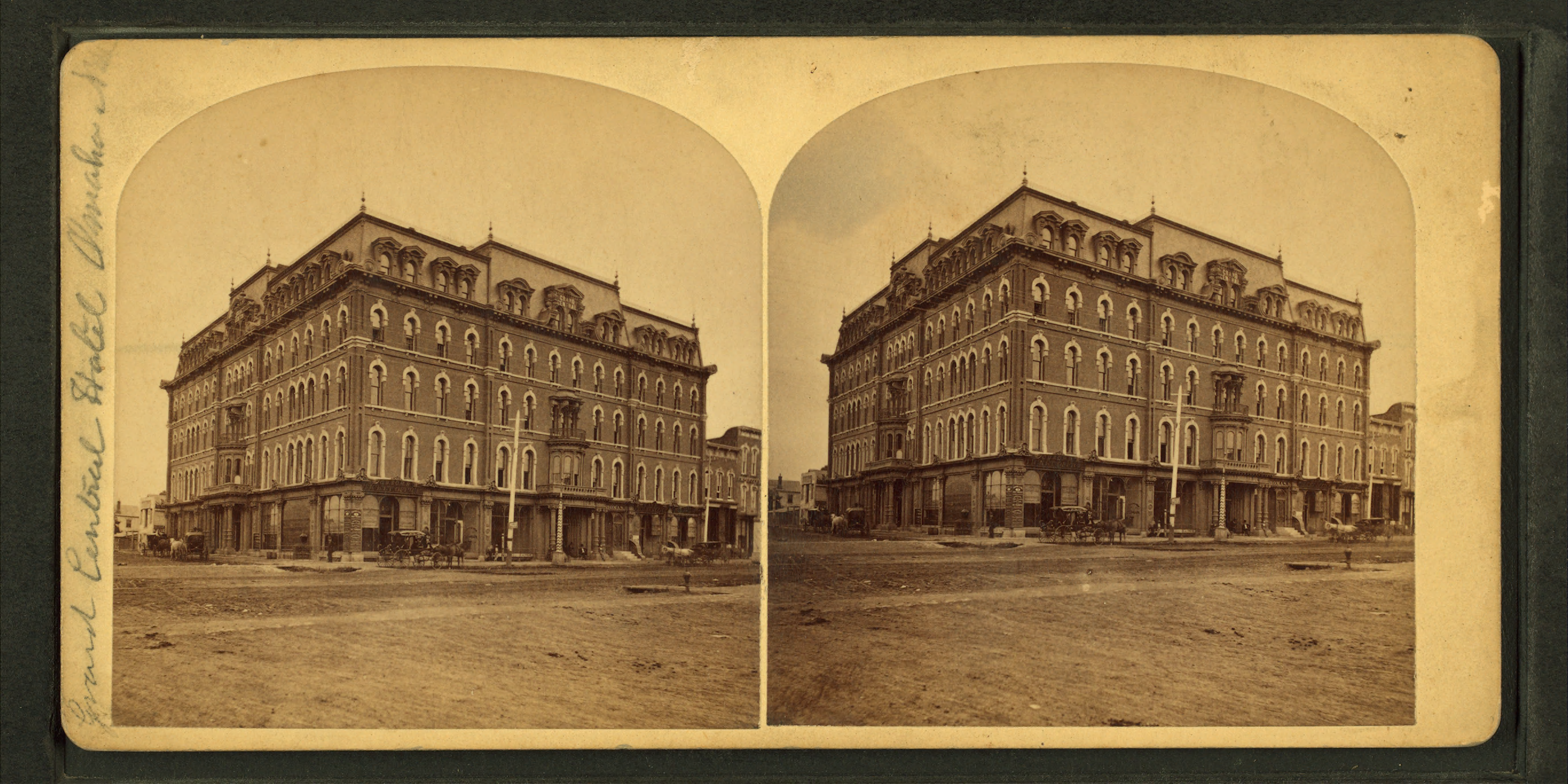
A view of the original Grand Central.

== See also ==
- History of Omaha
