= Hill Hotel (Omaha, Nebraska) =

- U.S. National Register of Historic Places
- Omaha Landmark
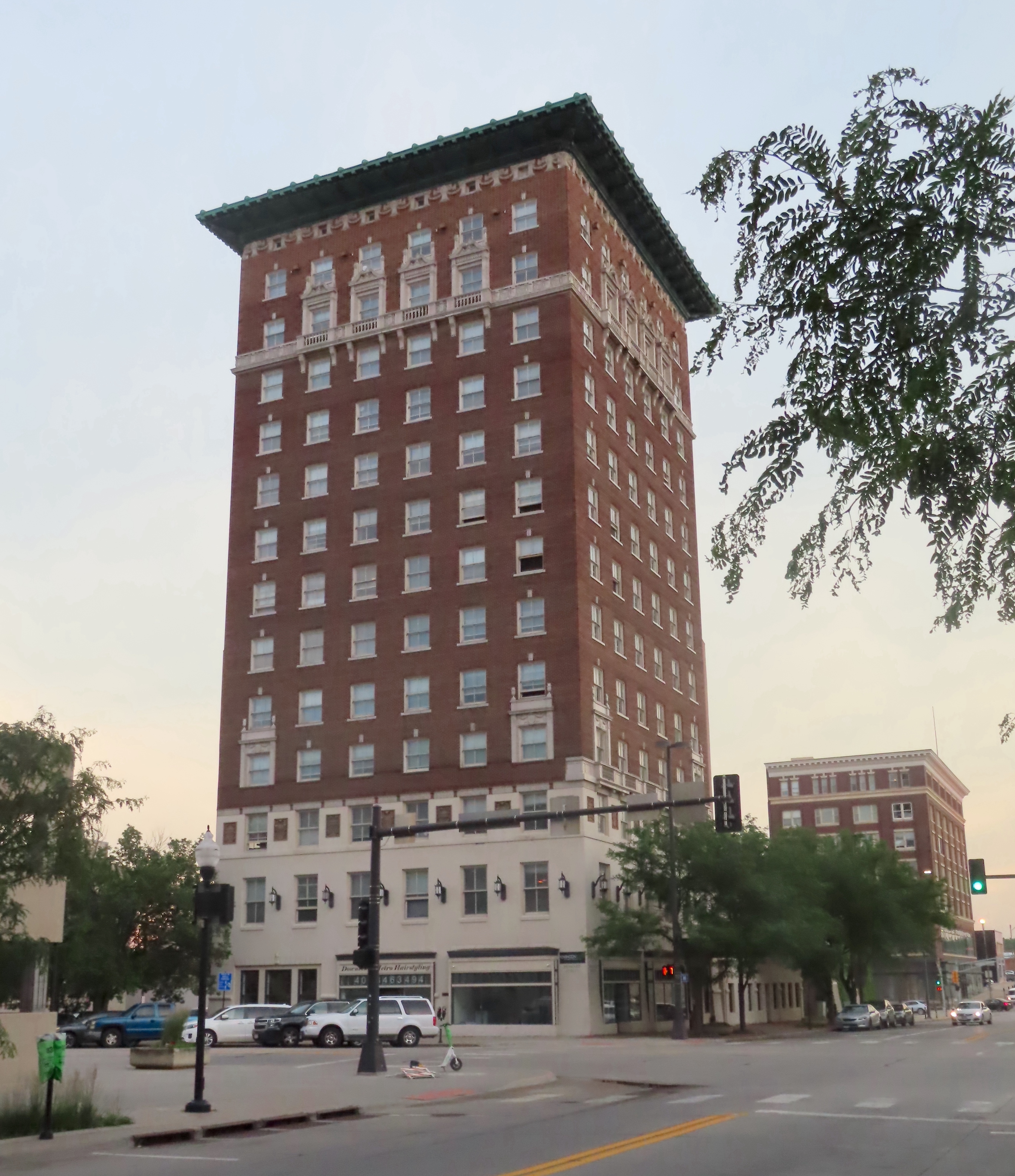
- Viewed from the northwest, 2022

- Location within Nebraska Location within the United States
- Location: 505 South 16th Street, Omaha, Nebraska
- Coordinates: 41°15′19″N 95°56′12″W
- Built: 1919
- Architect: John McDonald, Alan McDonald
- Architectural style: Early Commercial, Colonial Revival
- NRHP reference No.: 88000377

Significant dates
- Added to NRHP: April 20, 1988
- Designated OMAL: July 14, 1981

The Hill Hotel, also known as Kensington Tower, is a historic building located in Downtown Omaha, Nebraska. The building is one of the last existing examples of Colonial Revival architecture in Omaha. It is located on the historic 16th Street Mall, and contains 12 floors of apartments, with a book store on the first floor.
