= Hospe Music Warehouse =

- Hospe Anton Music Warehouse
- U.S. National Register of Historic Places
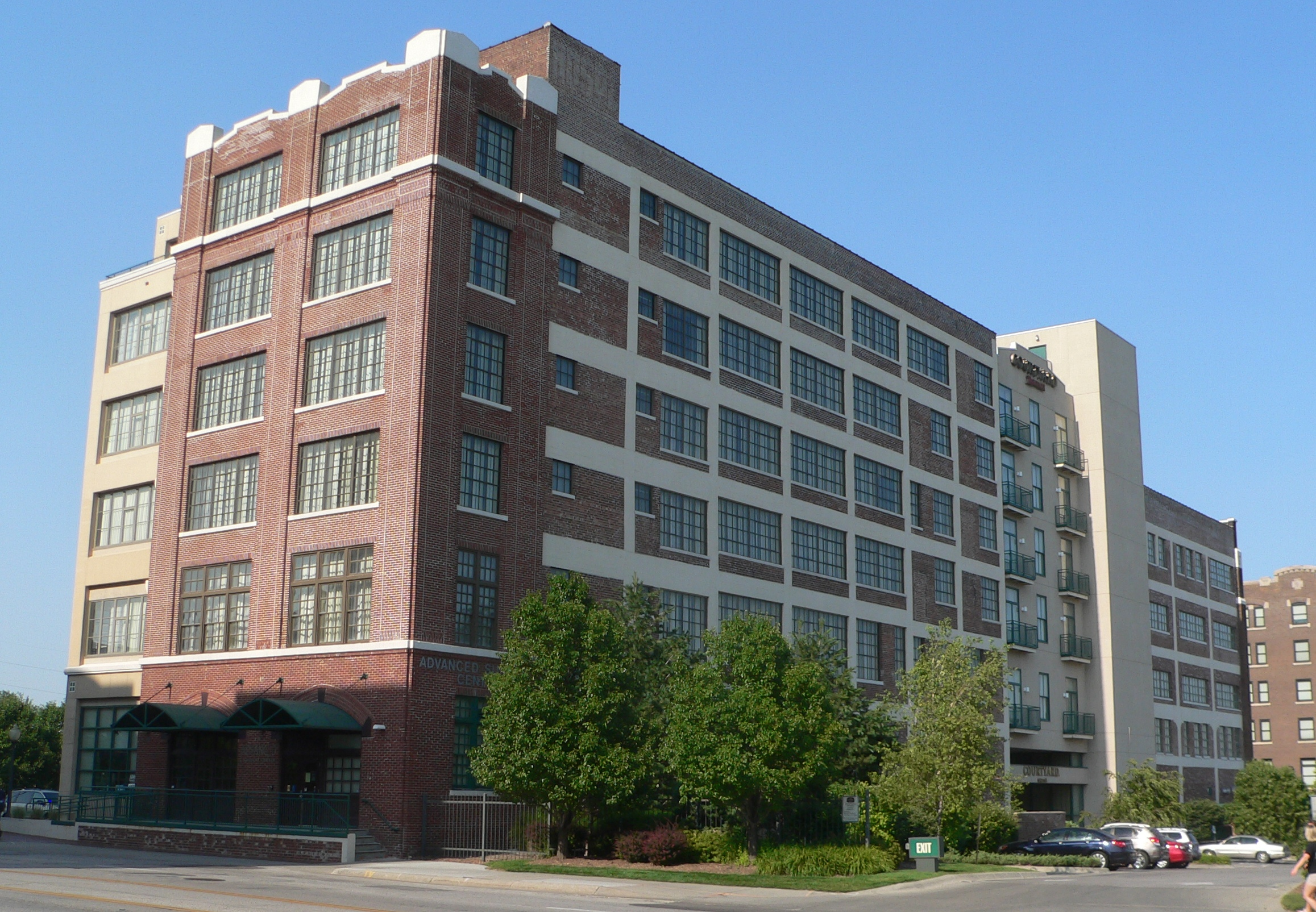
- Omaha Downtown Marriott Courtyard hotel. The Anton Hospe Music Warehouse is the red-brick portion in the foreground.

- Location within Nebraska Location within the United States
- Location: Omaha, Nebraska
- Coordinates: 41°15′33.1″N 95°55′43.4″W
- Built: 1919
- Architect: Fisher, George
- Architectural style: Early Commercial
- MPS: Warehouses in Omaha MPS
- NRHP reference No.: 98000896
- Added to NRHP: July 23, 1998

The Anton Hospe Music Warehouse is a building located at 101 S. 10th Street in Downtown Omaha, Nebraska. It was designed by commercial architect George Fisher and built in 1919 for Anton Hospe, who began business as a picture framer in 1874 and ultimately expanded to a major wholesale and retail dealer in art and musical instruments. The building was operated as the Hospe Music Warehouse until 1936.

The building is now part of the Marriott Omaha Downtown Courtyard hotel. Portions of it are also occupied by Advanced Surgery Center.

In 1998, the building was listed in the National Register of Historic Places.
