= Gene Leahy Mall =

Park in Omaha, Nebraska

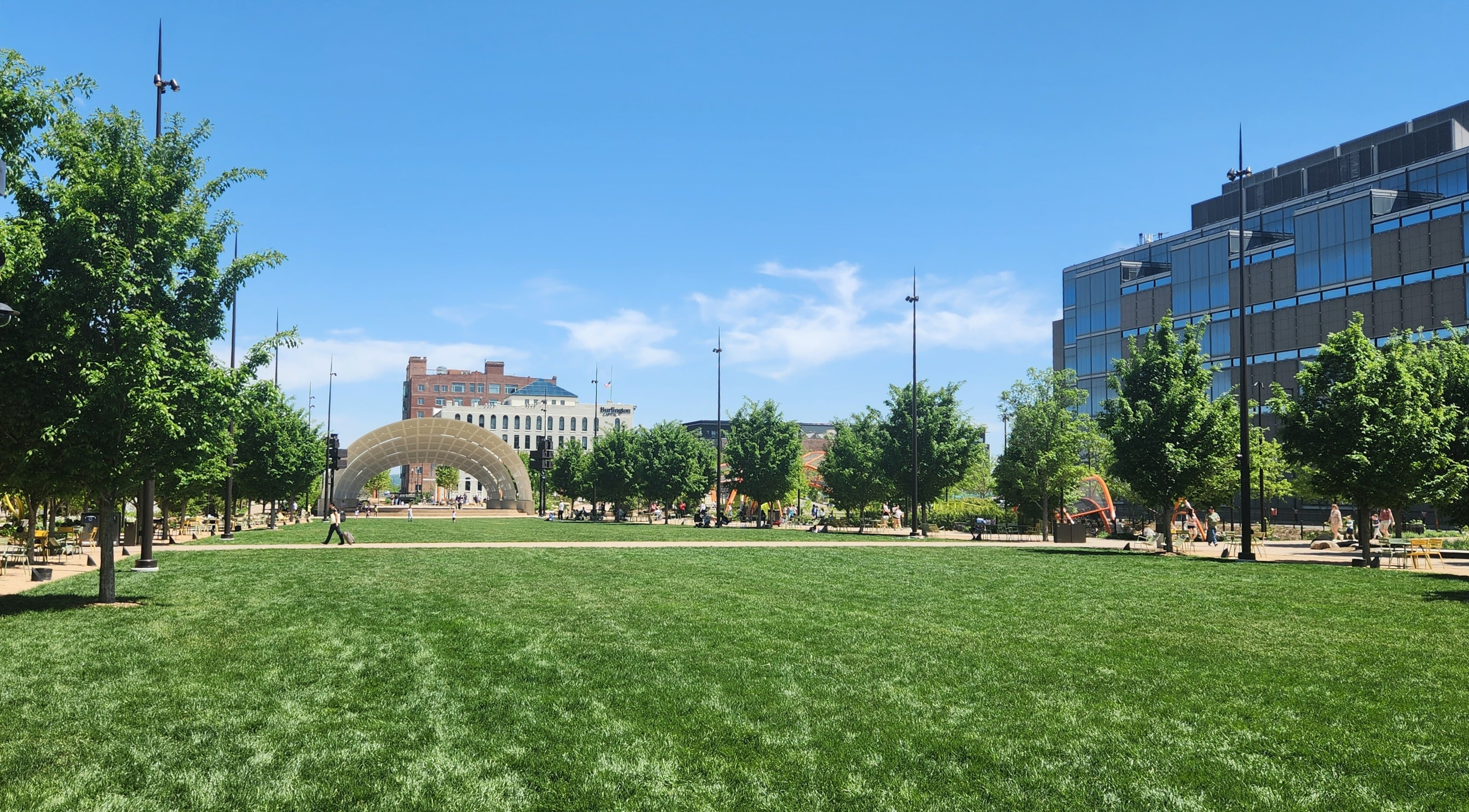
- View of the mall in 2025
- Interactive map of Gene Leahy Mall
- Type: Municipal (Omaha)
- Location: Downtown Omaha, Nebraska, U.S.
- Coordinates: 41°15′29″N 95°55′52″W
- Area: 9.6 acres (39,000 m^{2})
- Open: All year
- Status: Open
- Website: theriverfrontomaha.com/visit-the-riverfront/gene-leahy-mall/

Gene Leahy Mall, also known locally as The Mall, is a 9.6-acre (39,000 m^{2}) park located in Downtown Omaha, Nebraska, United States. The park features two large slides, a sculpture garden, a remote-control boat cove, a large children's play area, and an amphitheater where outdoor concerts are held in the summer. The mall is decorated with thousands of lights during the winter holiday season. Connected on its eastern edge with the Heartland of America Park, it also borders the site of the Mutual of Omaha Headquarters Tower, the former Burlington Headquarters Building, the Old Market and the ConAgra campus.

== History ==
In June 1973, the Omaha City Council dedicated $2.37 million for construction of a downtown mall. Demolition of properties on the malls site began in August 1975 and was completed by May 1980. In September 1977, Burger King announced that it would be gifting $5,000 to aid in the construction of a playground for the mall.

In June 1977, the first block, directly East of the W. Dale Clark Library, officially opened. Plans were to have the rest of the mall completed by 1981. However, when construction started in 1981, $11 million had been spent and it had only appeared to be a hole in the ground. The lagoon portion of the Gene Leahy Mall officially opened on July 15, 1982.

In 1989, the Nash Block, which was partially razed in 1975 for the mall, was renovated into an apartment complex known as the Greenhouse. In May 1992, Central Park Mall's name was changed to Gene Leahy Mall to honor former Omaha mayor Gene Leahy. The last major portion of the mall to be completed, located between 8th and 10th street, was completed in 1995.

In March 2013, a $1.8 million contract was approved for an overhaul of the lagoon and other mall renovations. Renovations started in March and were completed in November.

In 2018, further renovation projects were announced. These would include raising the mall to street level, removing the lagoon, and adding more space for public activities. The Gene Leahy Mall closed for renovations in March 2019. The Easternmost block was closed off in 2019 and was used to assist in renovation of the rest of the mall. Mutual of Omaha later purchased the block in 2022 to assist in the development of its new headquarters tower. In July 2022, the redevelopment of the Mall was completed; featuring a new concert venue pavilion, open lawn area, and redesigned waterfront walkway, while retaining the iconic metal slides.

Gene Leahy Mall was one of the sites used for demonstrations against the Trump administration during the 50501 protests in April 2025. An estimated 2,000 people were in attendance.

== Design ==
Located in Downtown Omaha, the Gene Leahy Mall is bounded by a five block area stretching from South 13th Street to South 8th Street. The mall takes up a total area of 9.6 acres (39,000 m^{2}). The mall includes a concert venue, open lawn area, a waterfront walkway, and a playground. Prior to renovations in 2019, the mall included a large lagoon area and extended all the way East to South 14th Street.

== See also ==
- Parks in Omaha, Nebraska
