= Broatch Building =

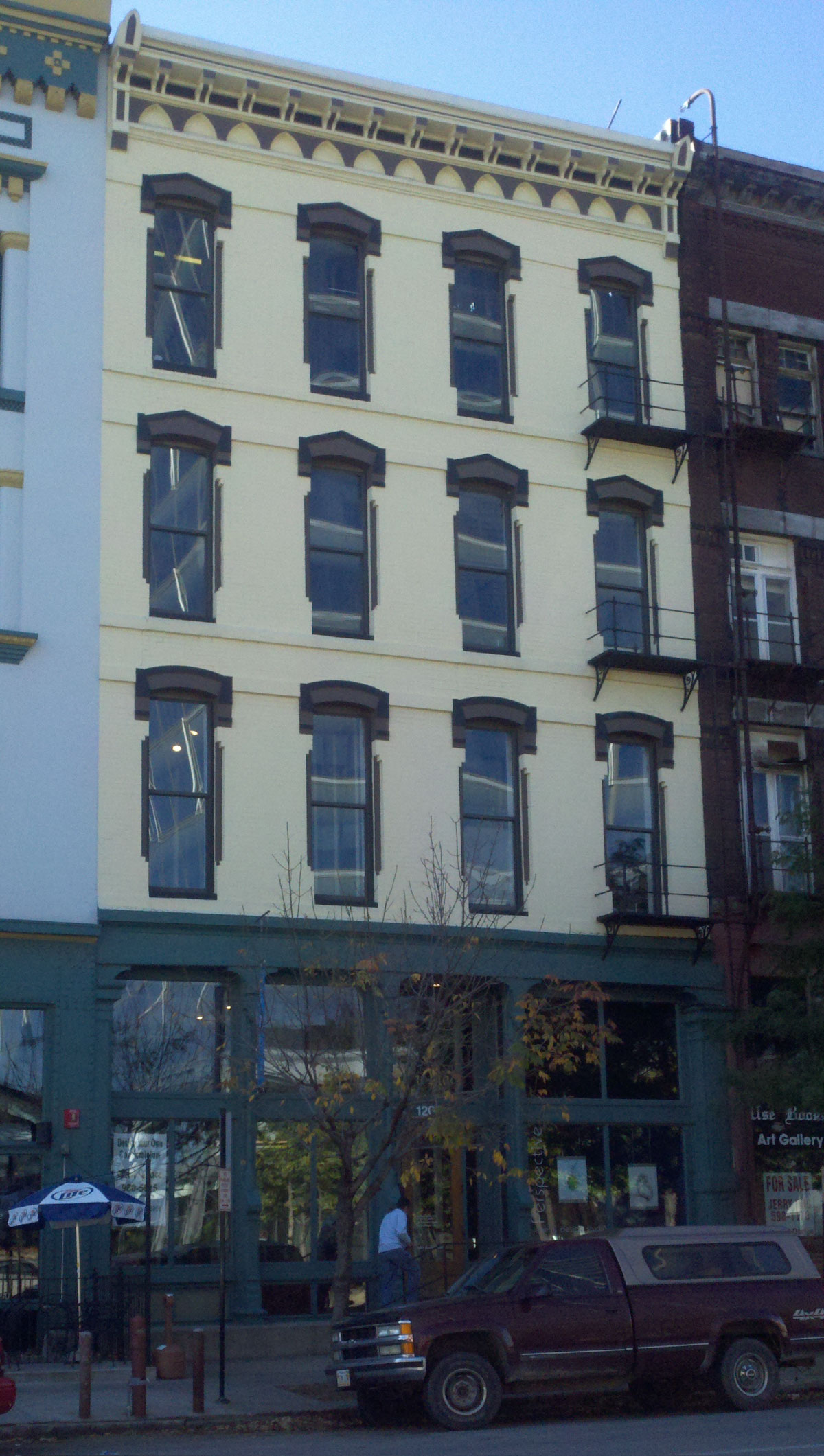
- Broatch Building

- Location within Nebraska Location within the United States
- 41.25621°N 95.93243°W
- Location: 1209 Harney Street, Omaha, Nebraska, United States

History
- Built: 1880; 146 years ago and 1887; 139 years ago

Site notes
- Architect: Mendelssohn & Lawrie

Omaha Landmark
- Designated: December 20, 1983

The Broatch Building is located at 1209 Harney Street in Downtown Omaha, Nebraska. Built in 1880 with an 1887 expansion, it was designated an Omaha Landmark on December 20, 1983, and is a contributing building to the Old Market Historic District, which was listed on the National Register of Historic Places in 1981.

== About ==
Built by an early Omaha entrepreneur, politician and civic leader named William James Broatch, the building became home to Omaha's first wholesale heavy hardware business in 1874. He also served twice as the mayor of Omaha.

Designed as a three-story building by Mendelssohn, Fisher and Lawrie and built in 1880, the building added a fourth story in 1887. In 1979 the building was completely renovated for the office of Bahr, Vermeer and Haecker, architects.

In early 2007 a local developer announced plans to renovate the Broatch and a neighboring building into condominiums. The development, called Erin Place, will feature a dozen condos.
