= Magnolia Hotel (Omaha) =

- Aquila Court Building
- U.S. National Register of Historic Places
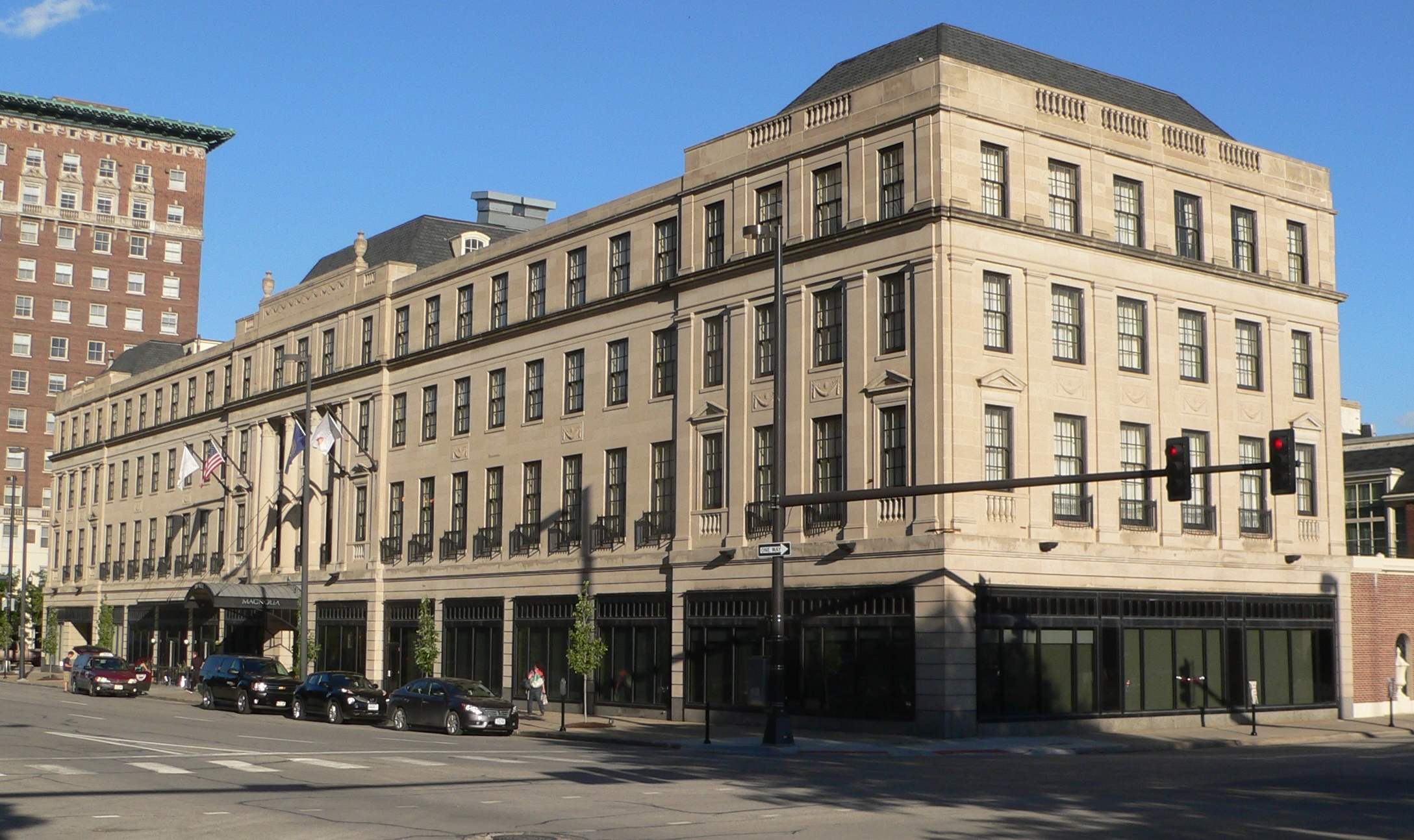

- Location within Nebraska Location within the United States
- Location: Omaha, Nebraska
- Coordinates: 41°15′19″N 95°56′16.25″W
- Architect: Holabird & Roche
- Architectural style: Renaissance
- NRHP reference No.: 73001059
- Added to NRHP: October 2, 1973

The Magnolia Omaha Hotel was originally constructed as the Aquila Court Building, and is located at 1615 Howard Street in downtown Omaha, Nebraska. Built in 1923, it was listed on the National Register of Historic Places in 1974.

== About ==
Designed by architectural firm Holabird and Roach for capitalists Chester and Raymond Cook of Chicago, the Aquila Court Building was built in a "U" shape and designed after the Bargello in Italy. The faces of George and Aquila Cook were emblazoned on the front of the building. A mixed-use building from its inception, the building's interior courtyard featured extensive landscape gardening. The original garden design resembled an Italian formal garden with stone paths, pools with goldfish, canals and numerous plants. A four-story building, the original design included court-level commercial space and studio apartments, as well as office space.

The building has undergone several major renovations. In 1972 the gardens were removed and completely covered with marble slabs and fountains.

In 1996 the building was gutted and converted to a hotel, The Westin Aquila. It 1999, it was renamed the Sheraton Omaha Hotel. In 2006, it became the Magnolia Omaha Hotel, part of the Magnolia Hotels chain.

== See also ==
- Landmarks in Omaha
