= Squatter's Row =

Neighborhood of Omaha, Nebraska

Coordinates: 41°16′37″N 95°55′49″W

Squatter's Row was a historic neighborhood in the downtown area of Omaha, Nebraska. It was an area between North 11th and North 13th Streets, from Nicholas to Locust Streets, behind the Storz Brewery. For more than 75 years this area was inhabited solely by squatters. A village of shacks built of materials salvaged from the Omaha city dump, the neighborhood included different enclaves such as Vinegar Flats, Blind Pig Alley, among others.

== Bibliography ==
- Larsen, L. and Cottrell, B. (1997) The Gate City: A History of Omaha. University of Nebraska Press. p. 158.
- Sullenger, T.E. (1937) "Problems of Ethnic Assimilation in Omaha," Social Forces, 15 (3) March. pp. 402–410.
