= Scoular Building =

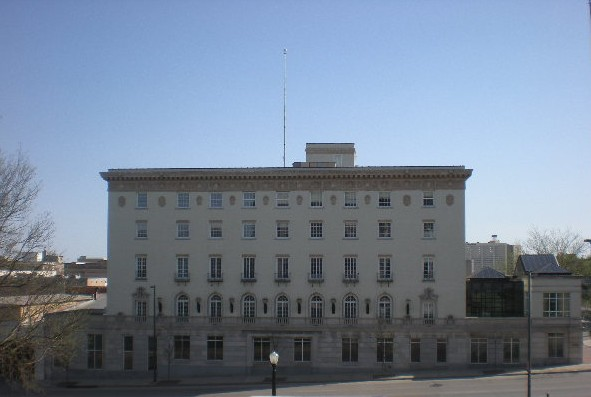
- The Scoular Building as seen from Dodge St.
- Interactive map of the Scoular Building area

General information
- Type: Commercial Office
- Location: 2027 Dodge St; Omaha, Nebraska
- Coordinates: 41.2594°N 95.9443°W
- Completed: 1925

Technical details
- Floor count: 5

Design and construction
- Architect: Alley Poyner Macchietto Architecture

The Omaha Scoular Building is a five-story commercial use building located in the Park East neighborhood of Downtown Omaha, Nebraska. It was designed in 1924 for the Knights of Columbus and was completed in 1927.
