= St. Nicholas Hotel (Omaha, Nebraska) =

Building in Omaha, Nebraska, United States

Coordinates: 41.25445°N 95.93195°W

- Interactive map of the St. Nicholas Hotel area

General information
- Location: Omaha, Nebraska, United States
- Construction started: 1854
- Completed: 1854

The St. Nicholas Hotel, originally called the Claim House, was located near 12th and Jackson Streets in present-day downtown Omaha, Nebraska. It was the first building in Omaha, the first hotel, and hosted the first church service in Omaha. The Omaha Claim Club met in the building regularly, as well.

== History ==
The Council Bluffs and Nebraska Ferry Company built the Claim House to encourage settlers to use their ferry. The first operators of the building, William and Rachel Snowden, named it the St. Nicholas Hotel and ran it during the summer and fall of 1854. The first church service in Omaha was held by Reverend Peter Cooper of neighboring Council Bluffs, Iowa on August 13, 1854.

A log cabin, the St. Nicholas Hotel consisted of one main room and an attached kitchen. Travelers and early settlers found temporary residence there, along with church services, dances and public meetings.

== See also ==
- History of Omaha, Nebraska
