= Simon Brothers Company =

- U.S. National Register of Historic Places
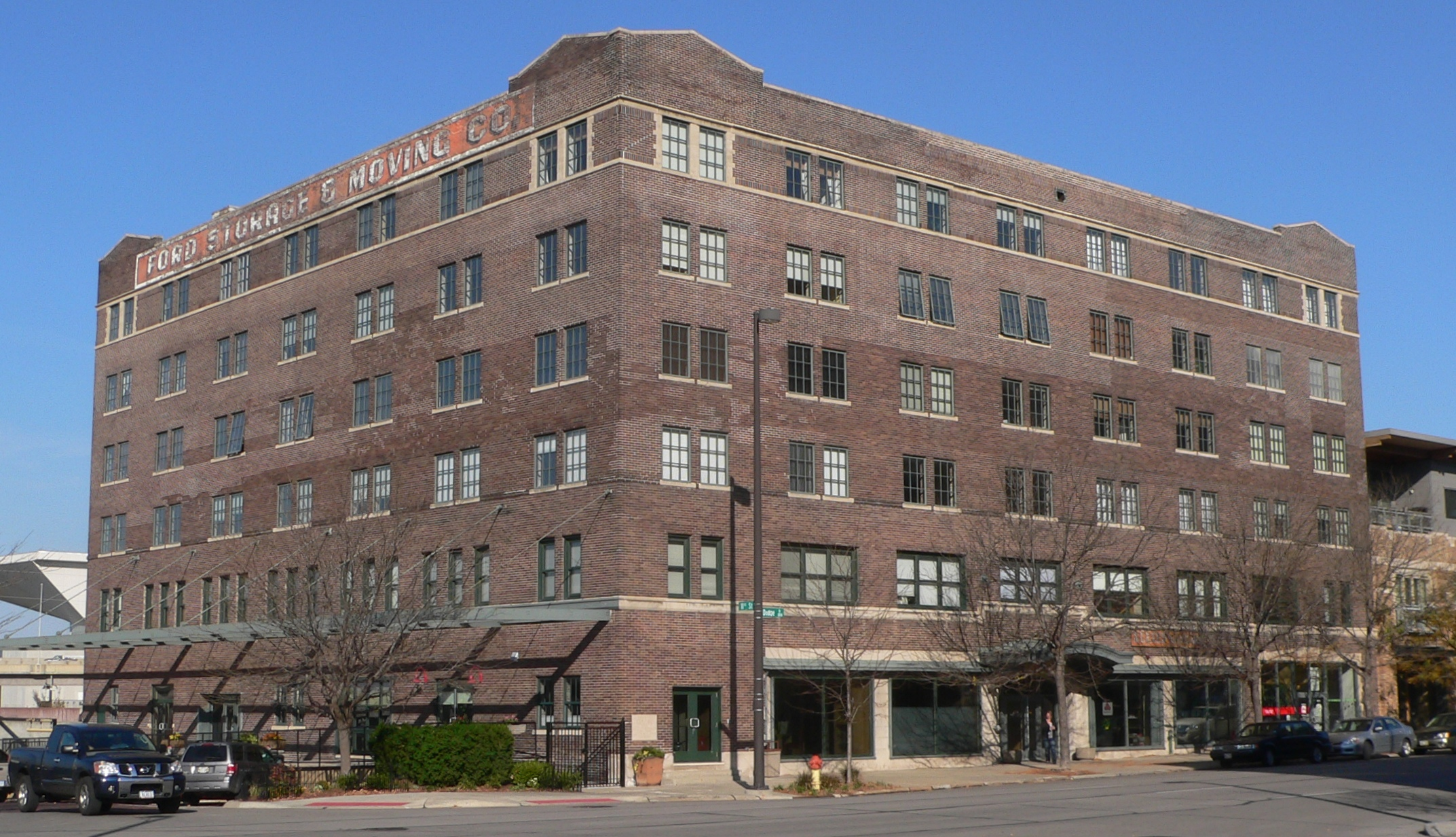
- The building in 2012

- Location within Nebraska Location within the United States
- Location: 1024 Dodge Street, Omaha, Nebraska
- Coordinates: 41°15′35″N 95°55′47″W
- Area: less than one acre
- Built: 1919
- Built by: J.L. Carnecie & Sons
- Architect: John Latenser Sr.
- Architectural style: Early Commercial
- MPS: Warehouses in Omaha MPS
- NRHP reference No.: 99000423
- Added to NRHP: April 1, 1999

The Simon Brothers Company is a historic six-story building in Omaha, Nebraska. It was built in 1919 by J.L. Carnecie & Sons for its namesake, a wholesale grocer whose president was Jacob Simon Sr., and designed by architect John Latenser Sr. It was acquired at auction by the Shade Island Hospital Trust Company in May 1932, and it belonged to the Remnik Corporation from December 1932 to July 1941. It was then acquired by the Ford Brothers Van and Storage Company, who sold it to the Ray A. Ford Real Estate Company in 1955, and it was acquired by the Dodge Street Limited Partnership in 1996. It has been listed on the National Register of Historic Places since April 1, 1999.
