= First National Bank Building (Omaha, Nebraska) =

Residential building in Omaha, Nebraska

- U.S. National Register of Historic Places
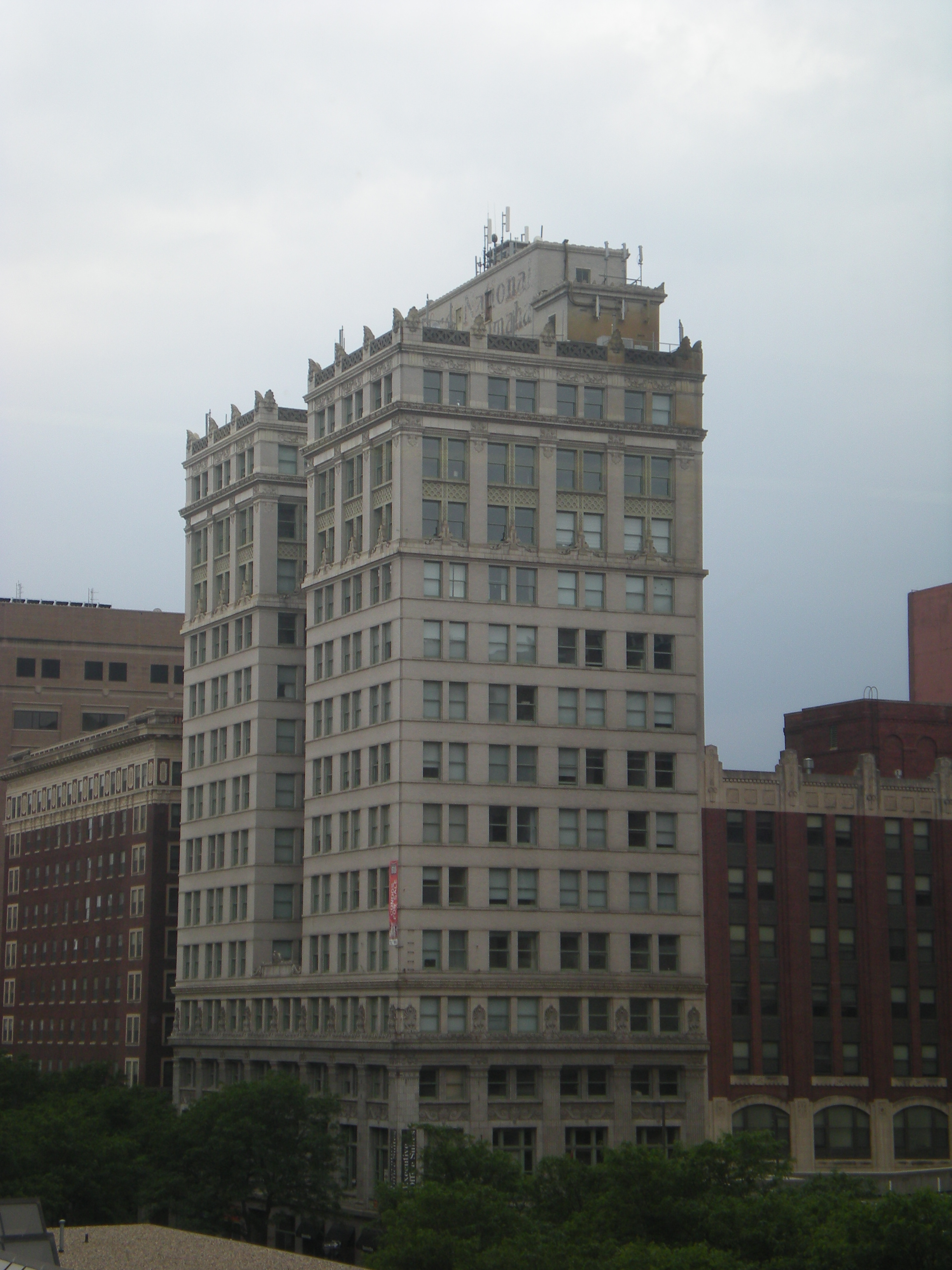
- Looking over 16th Street; view of the First National Bank Building, now Farnam 1600.

- Location within Nebraska Location within the United States
- Location: 300-312 16th St., and 1601-1605 Farnam St., Omaha, Nebraska
- Coordinates: 41°15′26″N 95°56′14″W
- Built: 1916
- Architect: Graham, Burnham & Co.
- Architectural style: Renaissance
- NRHP reference No.: 82003187
- Added to NRHP: June 25, 1982

The First National Bank Building is a U-shaped, fourteen-story, historic steel structure building located on the corner of 16th and Farnam street in Downtown Omaha, Nebraska. The building was constructed in 1917. It was the original building for the First National Bank as well as the first high-rise building built in Omaha. At 210 feet (64 m), it is the 17th tallest building in the city and its unique structure makes it a landmark in downtown Omaha.

Renovations in 2000 converted a majority of the building from office space to residential. Currently, the first floor acts as a lobby for residents of the building. A separate partition houses retail, restaurants and another separate entrance exists for the 27 offices located on the second and third floors. Floors four through fourteen contain 81 luxury one- and two-bedroom condominiums.

When the building was remodeled and turned into condominiums, a library, gym, and basement storage were added.
