= List of Omaha landmarks =

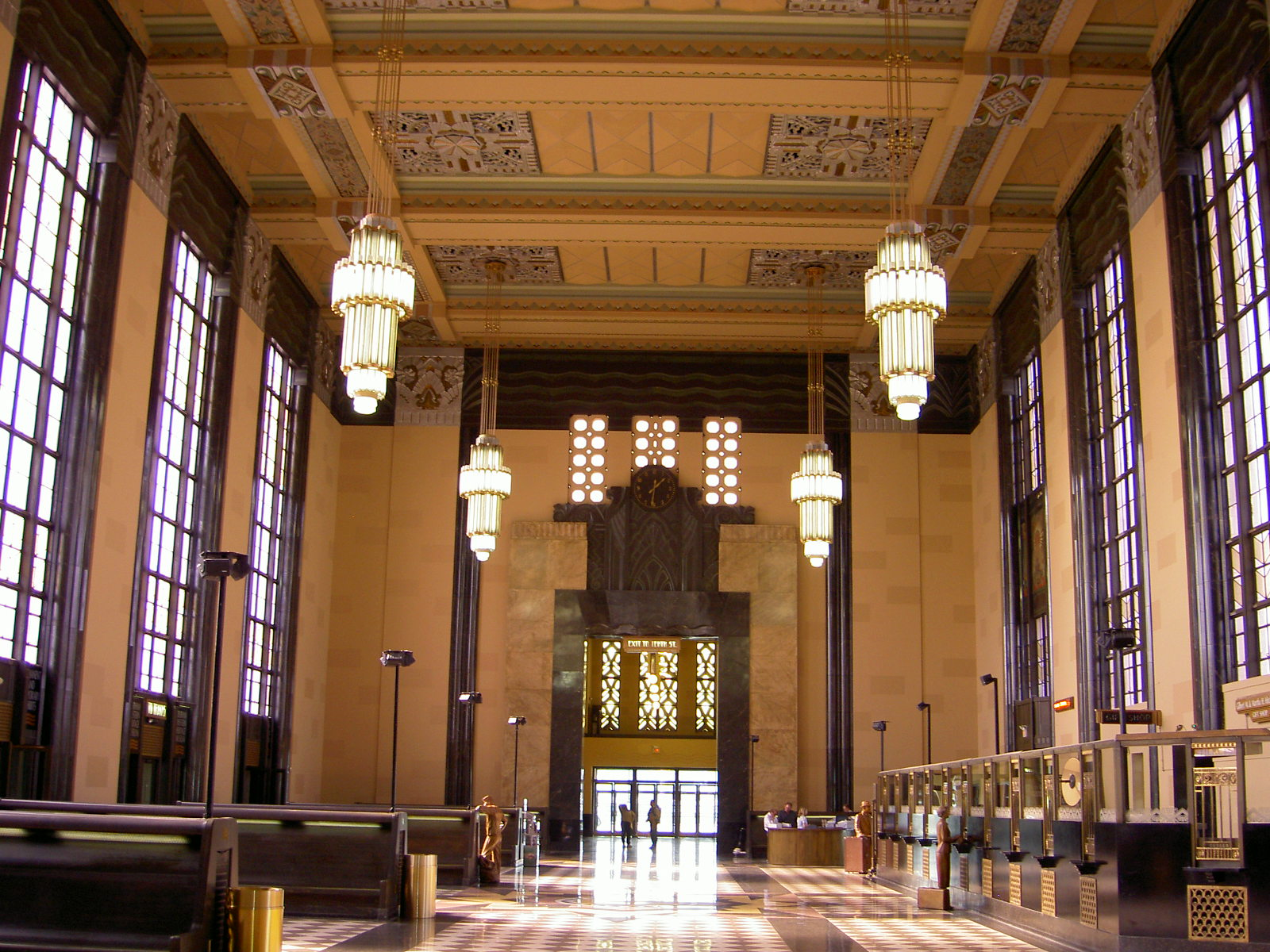
The interior foyer of Downtown Omaha's Union Station, located at 801 South 10th Street in the Omaha Rail and Commerce Historic District.

This article covers Omaha landmarks designated by the City of Omaha Landmark Heritage Preservation Commission. In addition, it includes structures or buildings listed on the National Register of Historic Places and those few designated as National Historic Landmarks, indicating their varying level of importance to the city, state and nation.

The following list includes individual properties, as well as historic districts and National Historic Landmarks in Omaha, in the U.S. state of Nebraska. Residential, commercial, religious, educational, agricultural and socially significant locations are included.

== Landmark preservation in Omaha ==
Omaha has sought to preserve its historic landmarks for more than 50 years. The first city report on historical sites written in 1959, and the first buildings in the city were listed on the National Register of Historic Buildings in the 1960s. The demolition of the Old Post Office in 1966, along with the Old City Hall the next year, were rallying points for preservationists in the city. Omaha developed a comprehensive plan for landmark preservation in 1980.

Some years, the demands of changing business in Downtown Omaha have overridden the desires of preservationists to maintain historic structures. In 1989, all 24 buildings of the area's "Jobbers Canyon" were demolished, representing the highest number of buildings lost at one time that were listed on the National Register of Historic Places to date. The Christian Specht Building is the only extant building with a cast-iron facade known in Nebraska today, and one of the few built in the state.

The Burlington Train Station, also a downtown historic landmark, sat empty for more than thirty years and was stripped of much of its historical grandeur. In 2006 a group of developers began renovating the building for mixed-use, which will include residential condos. Not all of the buildings lost are deemed significant; the Omaha Auditorium, designed by noted and prolific local architect John Latenser, Sr., was almost universally panned for its gaudy and half-completed construction.

In North Omaha, the historic Strehlow Terrace apartments have been renamed "Chambers Court" in honor of locally renowned Nebraska Legislator Ernie Chambers. Fort Omaha, an Indian War-era supply depot for the United States Army, has been re-purposed as a local community college.

In April 2001 the Nebraska Methodist Health System purchased the Indian Hills Theater on West Dodge Road and. In June it announced plans to demolish the theater and replace it with a parking lot. Indian Hills was the last drum-shaped, three-projector Cinerama theater in the United States. Despite grassroots formation of the Indian Hills Preservation Society, letters of support from Charlton Heston, Janet Leigh and Kirk Douglas, and the unanimous vote of the Omaha Landmarks Heritage Preservation Commission finding that the theater should be declared a Landmark of the City of Omaha, in August 2001 the building was demolished.

=== City of Omaha Landmarks Heritage Preservation Commission ===
The first comprehensive preservation ordinance in Nebraska was adopted by the Omaha City Council in 1977. The commission was created after the demolition of the Old Post Office, when the pro-preservation organization Landmarks, Inc. advocated its creation.

As of 2007, more than 90 buildings and structures in Omaha have received federal historic preservation tax incentives, and have been listed by the City of Omaha as Certified Historic Rehabs.

== National recognition ==
Many historic districts, sites, buildings, structures, and objects in Omaha have been listed on the National Register of Historic Places. Three have been designated as National Historic Landmarks by the United States Secretary of the Interior for their historical significance. However, no Omaha Landmarks have been designated National Historic Landmarks, and many have not been listed on the National Historic Register.

== Landmarks in Omaha ==
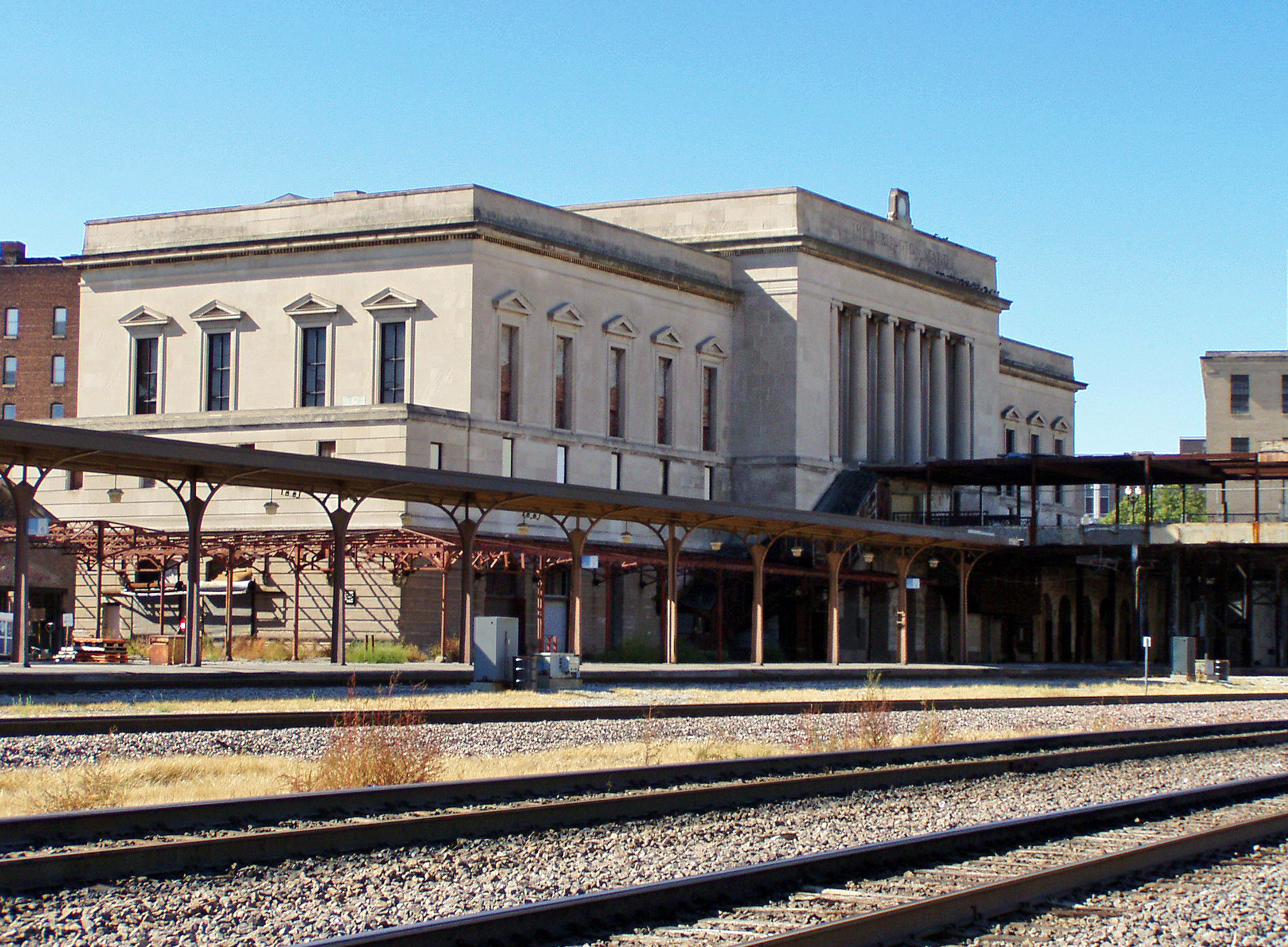
The Burlington Station, a contributing property to the Omaha Rail and Commerce Historic District in Downtown Omaha.

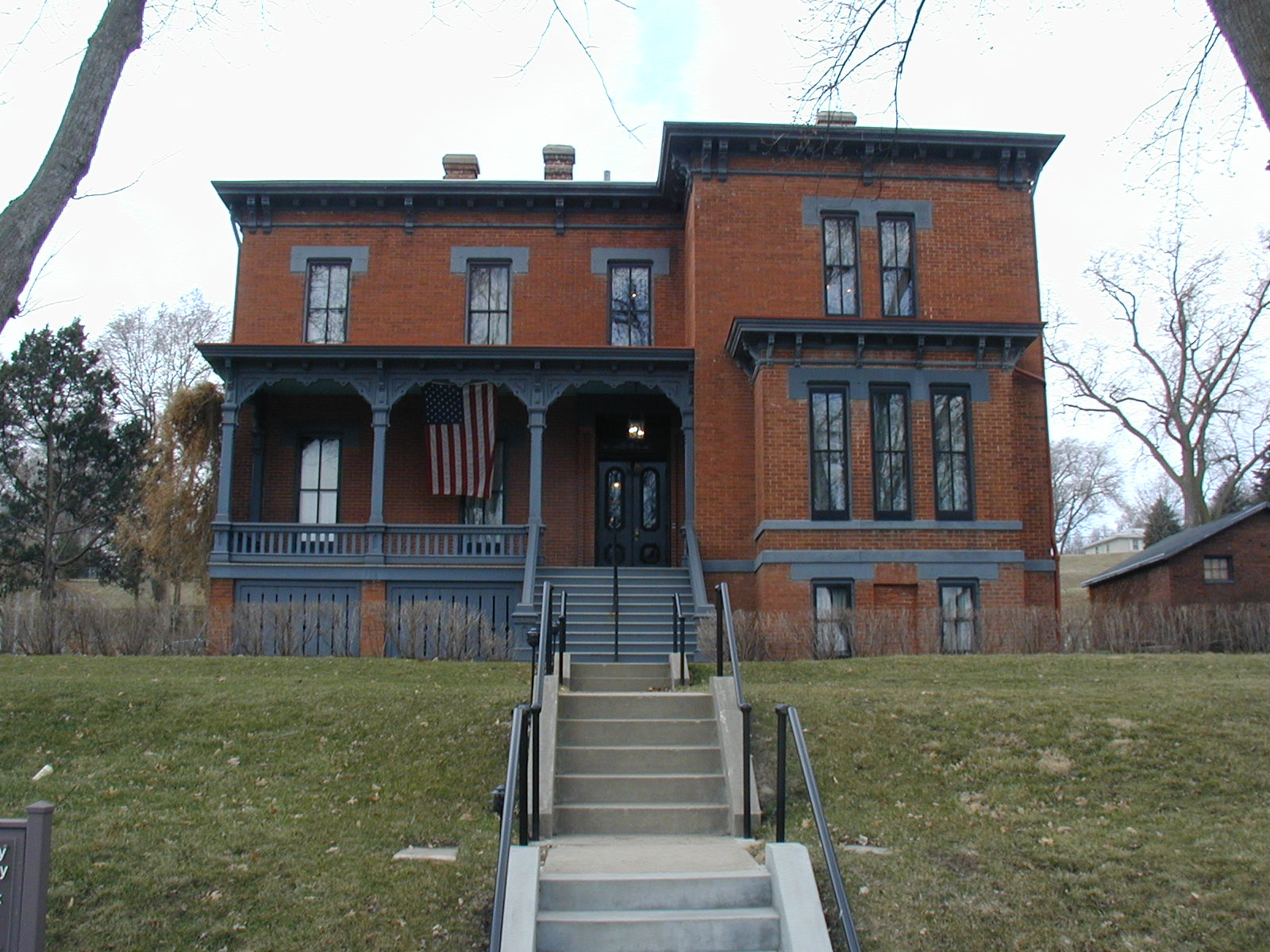
The 1878 General Crook House, a contributing property to the Fort Omaha Historical District.

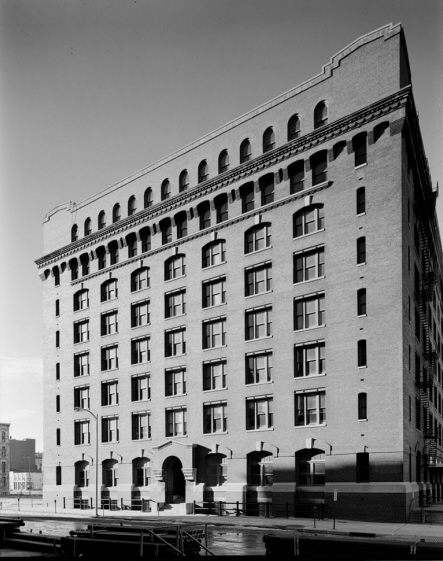
The Nash Block is the last remnant of the Jobbers Canyon Historic District.

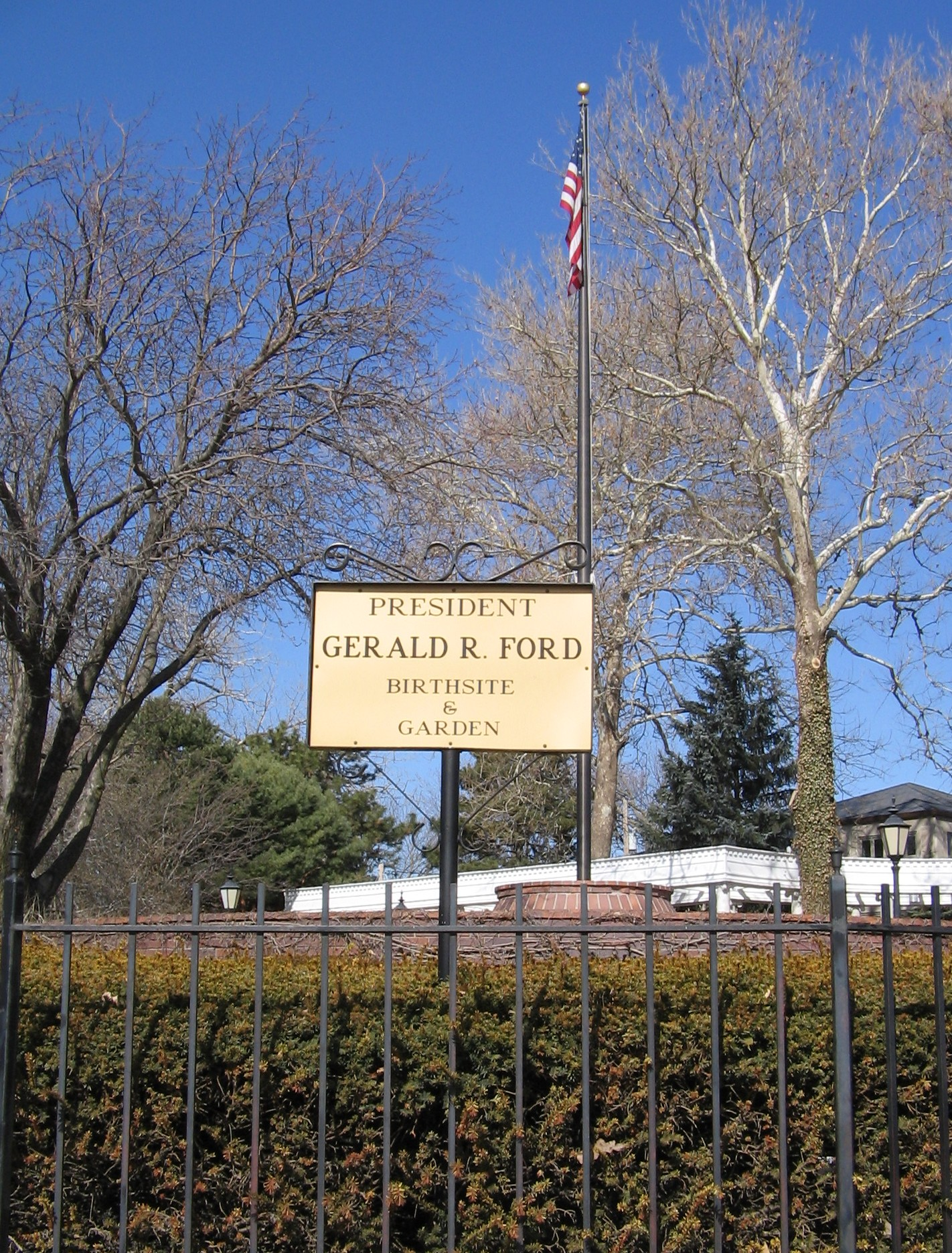
The Gerald R. Ford Birthsite and Gardens is located in the Field Club Historic District.

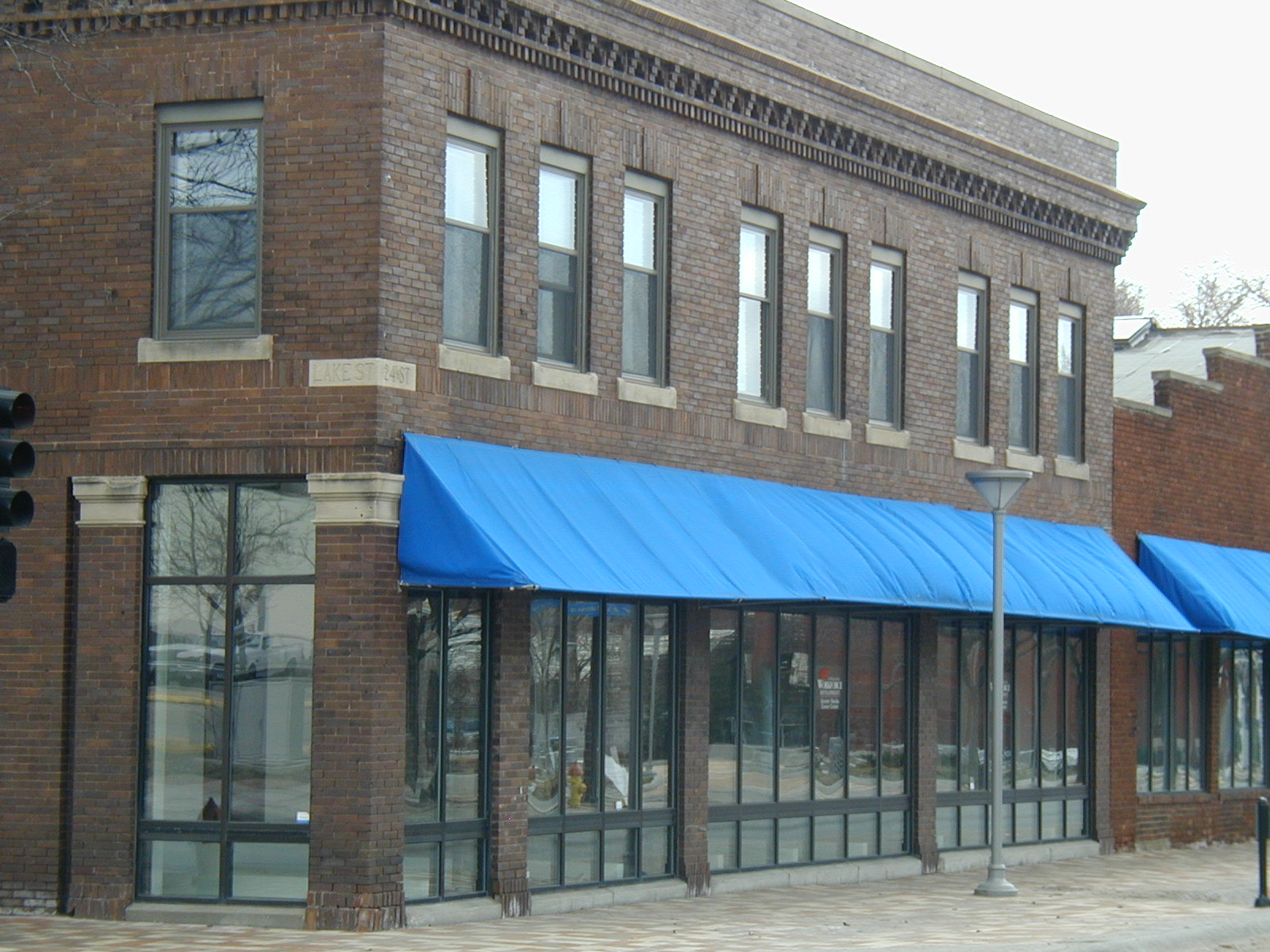
The Near North Side is home to several properties listed on the National Register of Historic Places.

Spaghetti Works is a business located in the Old Market Historic District.

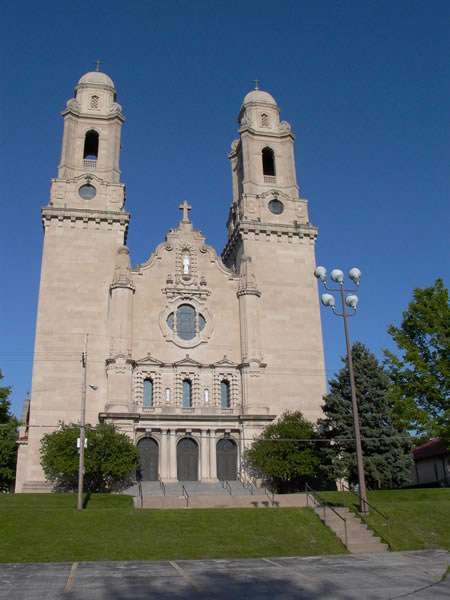
St. Cecilia Cathedral is a contributing property to the Gold Coast Historic District.

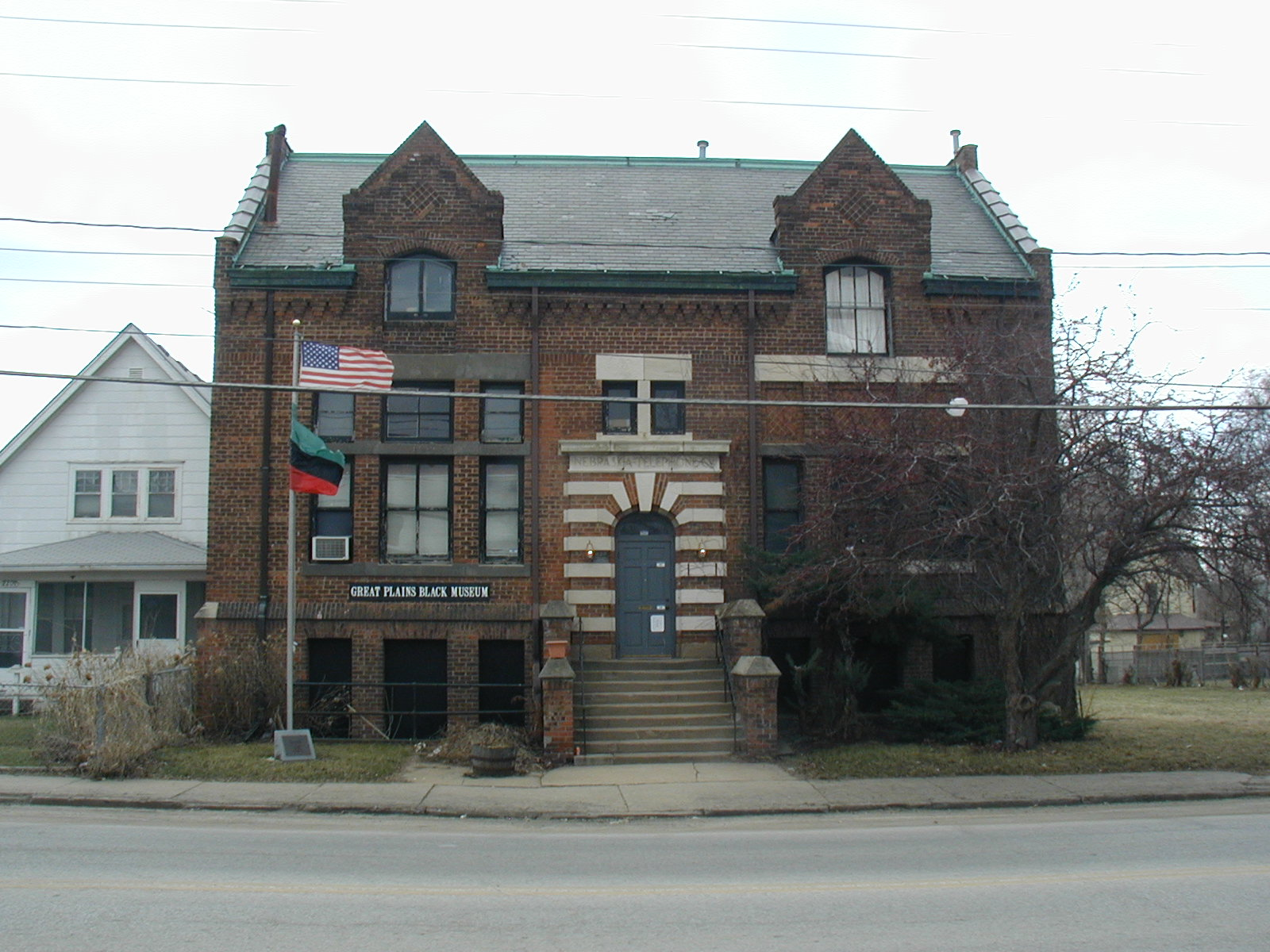
The Webster Telephone Exchange Building is the current location of the Great Plains Black History Museum.

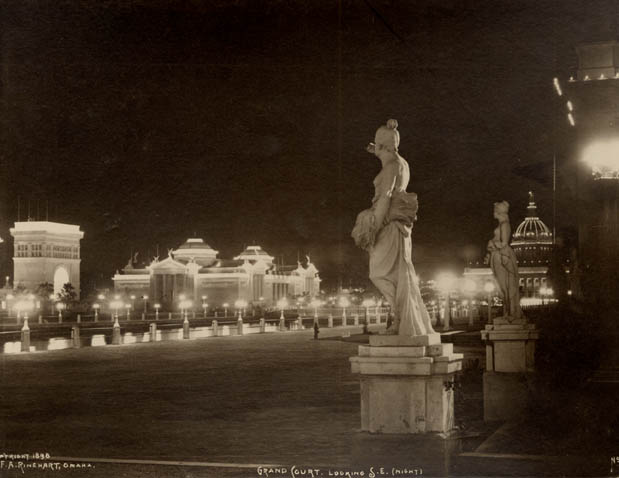
The Grand Court of the 1898 Trans-Mississippi Exposition was located in Kountze Place on the current site of Kountze Park in North Omaha.

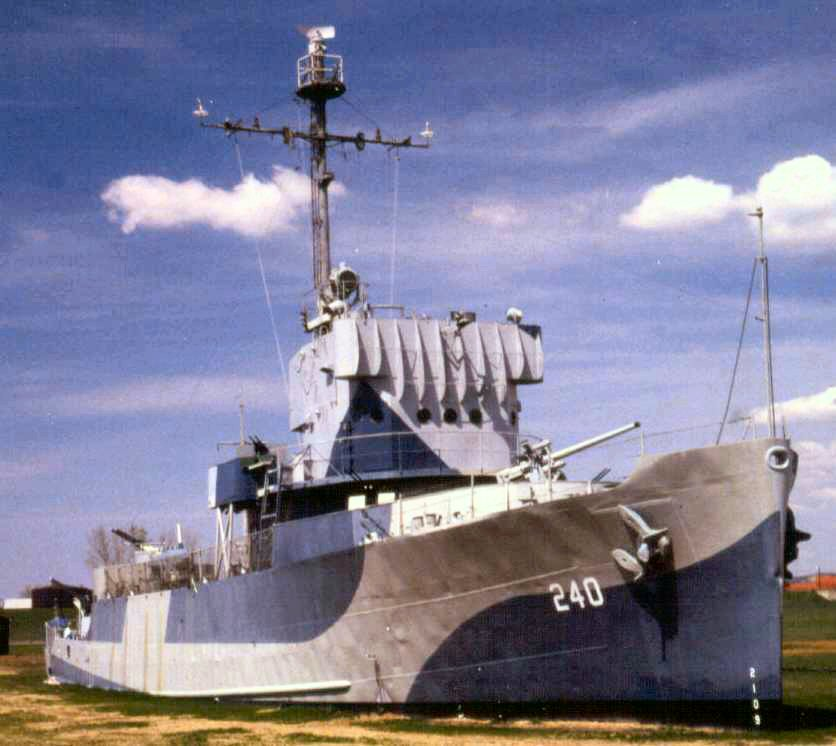
The USS Hazard is a National Historic Landmark located in Freedom Park.

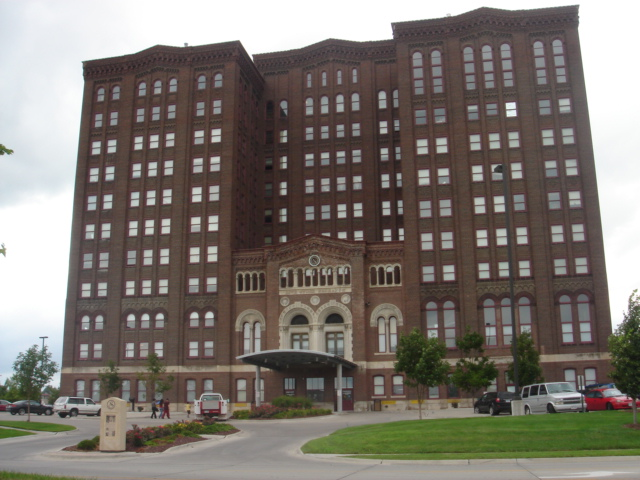
Front view of the Livestock Exchange Building at the South Omaha's Union Stockyards.

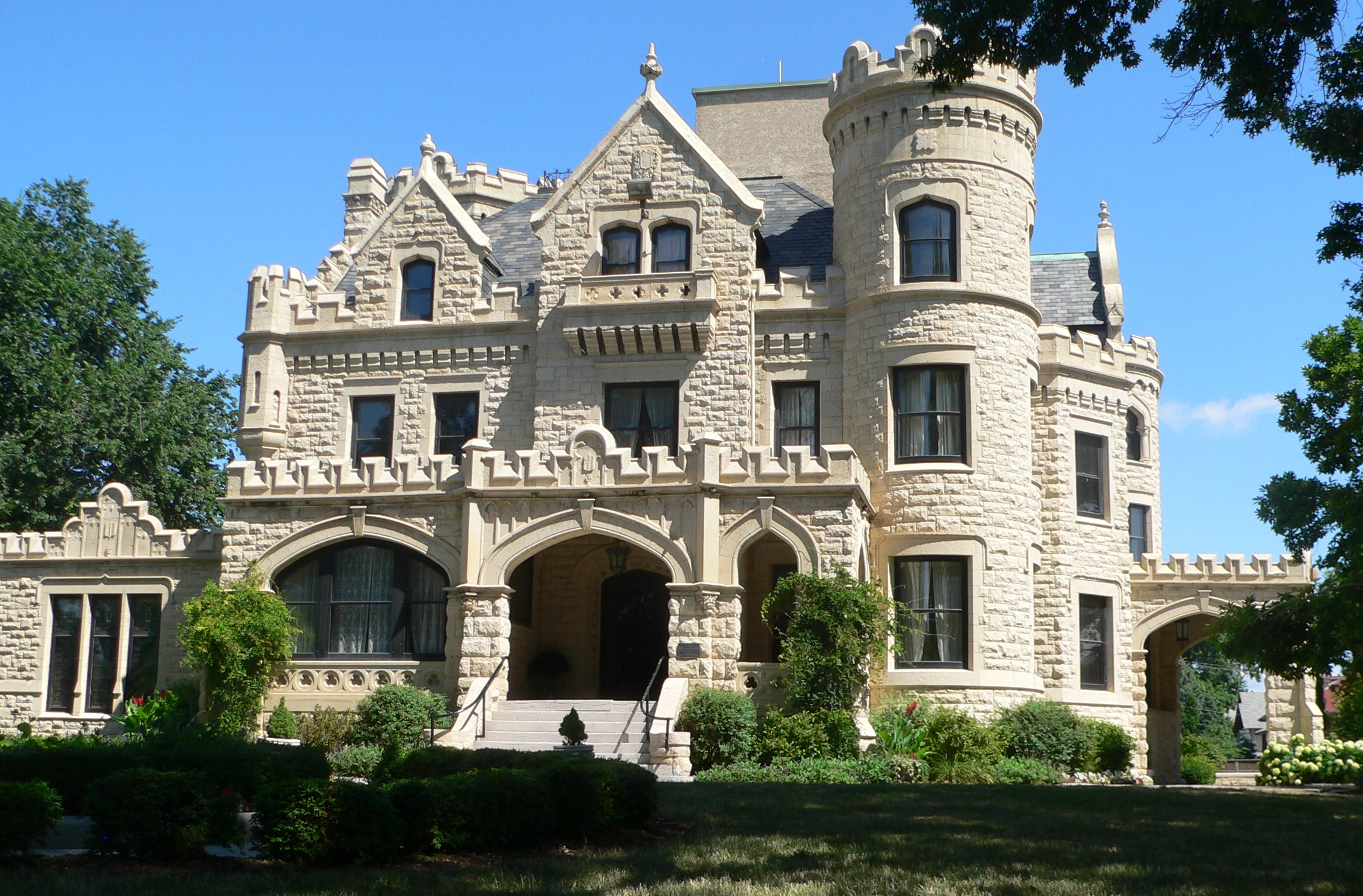
The Joslyn Castle is in the heart of the Gold Coast Historic District.

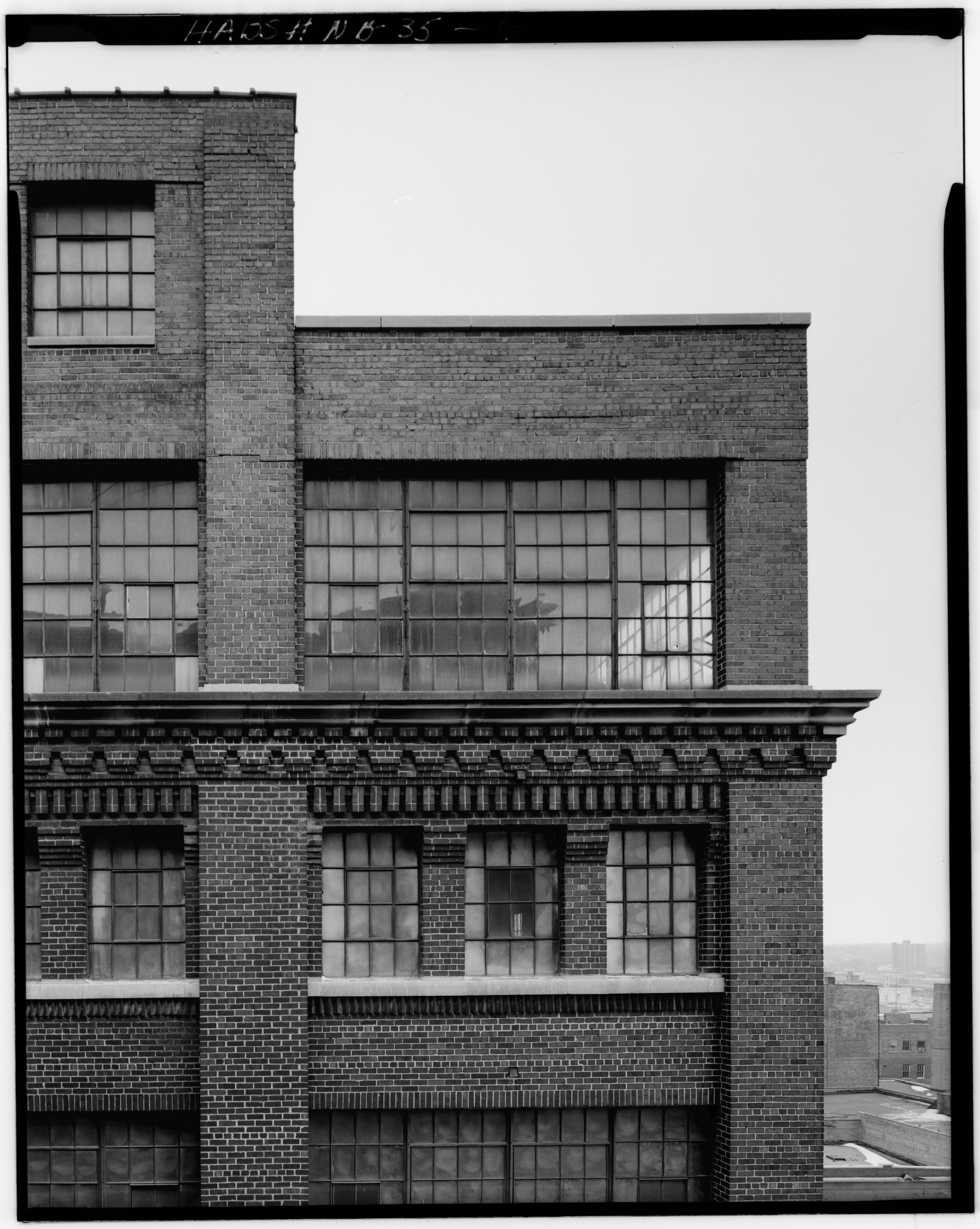
The M.E. Smith Building, formerly part of the Jobbers Canyon Historic District.

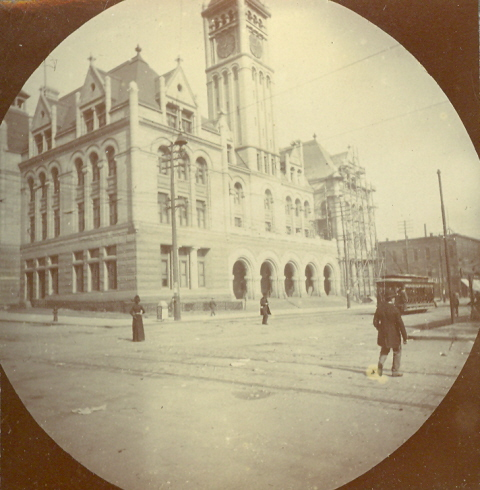
A 1900 street scene including the Old Post Office.

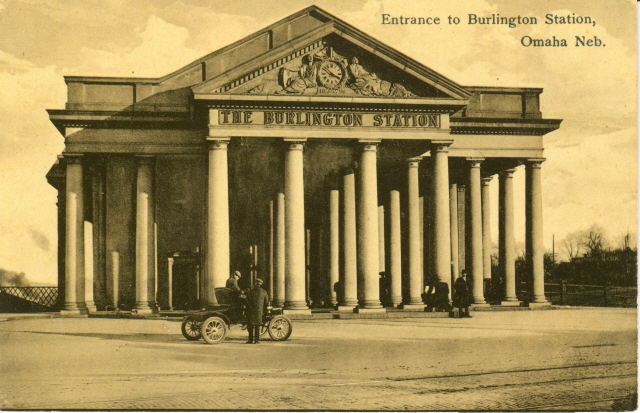
A 1910 postcard shows the historic columns at the front entrance of Omaha's Burlington Station.

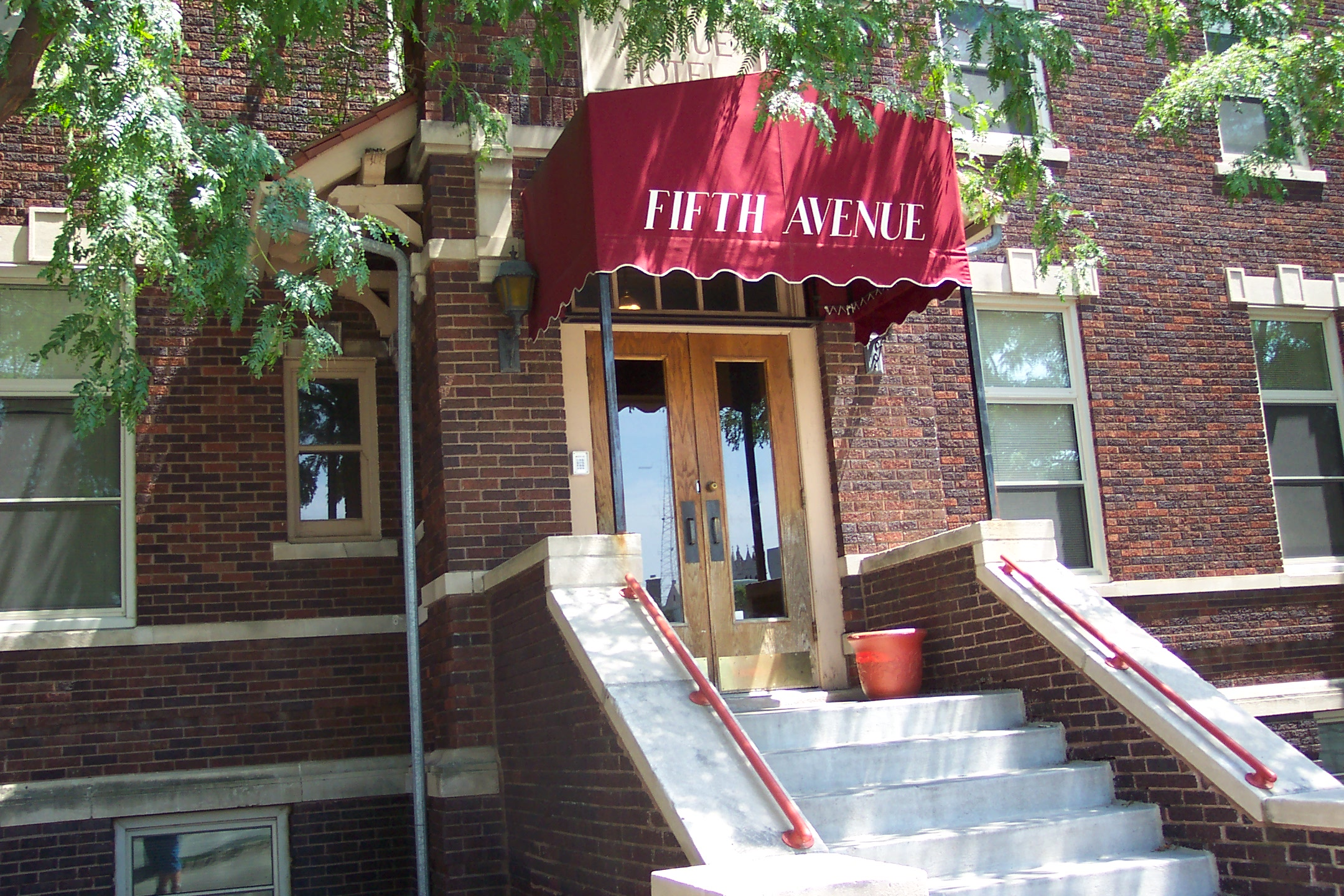
Current entrance to the historic Ford Hospital in Midtown Omaha.

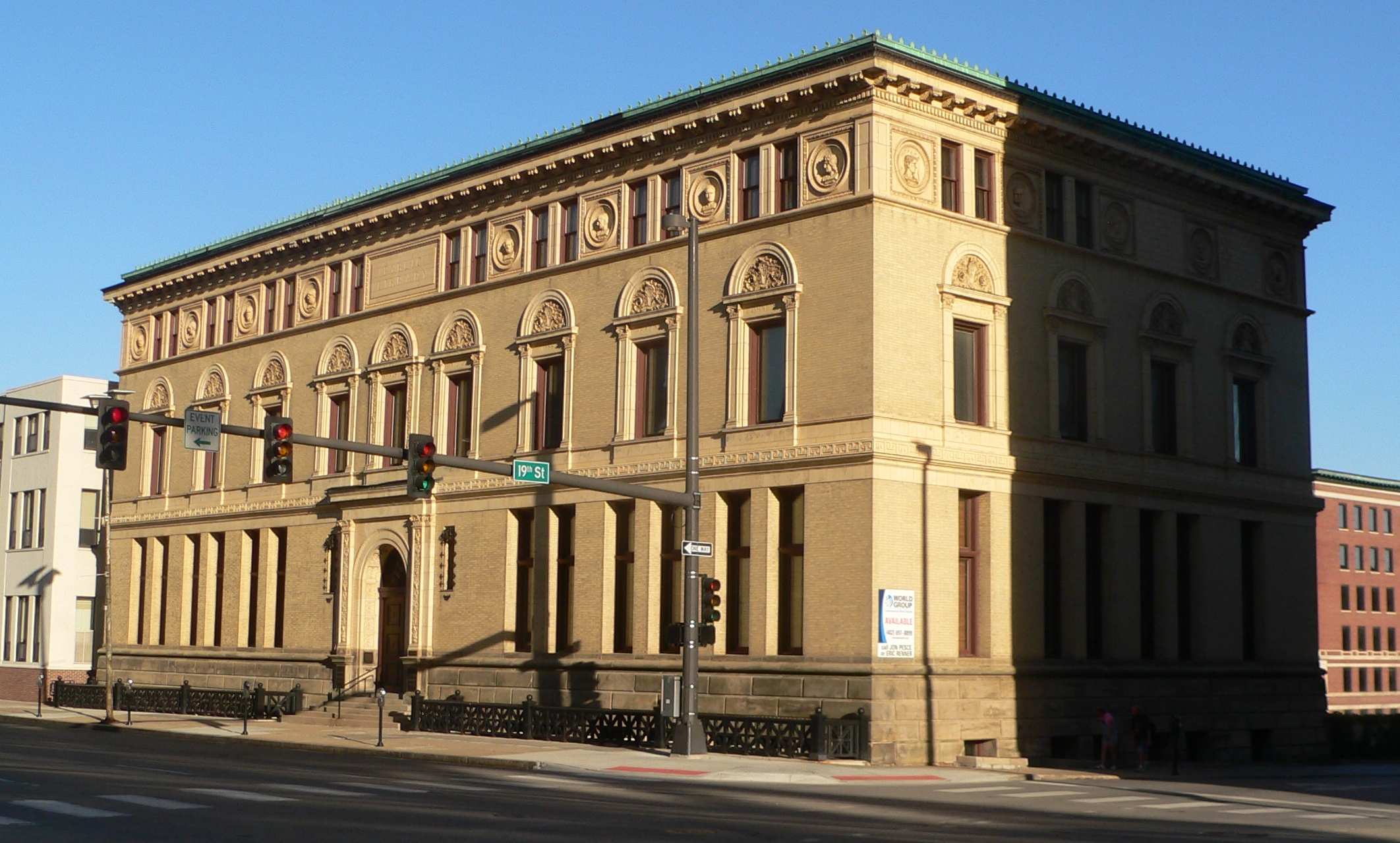
Omaha Public Library building, built in 1894 in downtown Omaha.

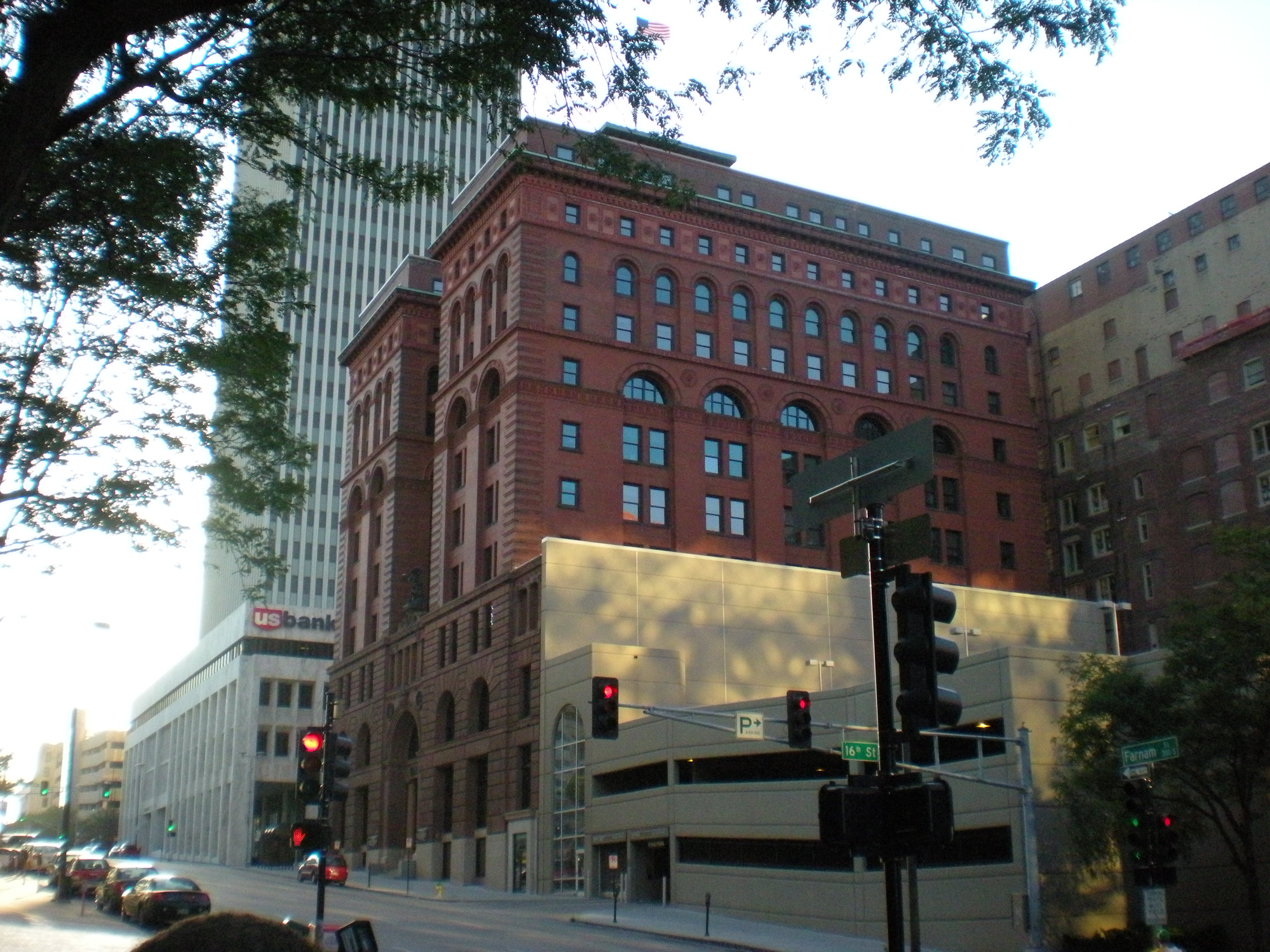
The Omaha National Bank Building in downtown Omaha was Omaha's first skyscraper built in 1888-89'.

| Name (Current name) | Built | Location | NRHP? | Omaha Landmark? |
|---|---|---|---|---|
| Ackerhurst Dairy Barn | 1935 | 15220 Military Road; 41°20′12″N 96°9′10″W | Yes | Yes |
| Ansonia Apartments | 1929 | 2221-23 Jones Street | No | Yes |
| Anheuser-Busch Beer Depot | 1887 | 1207–1215 Jones Street | Yes | No |
| Aquila Court Building (Magnolia Hotel) | 1923 | 1615 Howard Street | Yes | No |
| Astro Theater (Rose Blumkin Performing Arts Center) | 1926 | 2001 Farnam Street | Yes | No |
| Bank of Florence (Bank of Florence Museum) | 1856 | 8502 North 30th Street | Yes | Yes |
| John P. Bay House | 1887 | 2024 Binney Street | No | Yes |
| Beebe and Runyan Furniture Showroom and Warehouse | 1913 | 105 South 9th Street | Yes | No |
| Bemis Omaha Bag Company Building | 1887 | NW Corner of 11th and Jones Streets | Yes | Yes |
| Bemis Park Landmark Heritage District | 1889 | Cuming Street on the south to Hawthorne Avenue on the north; Glenwood Avenue on the west to North 33rd Street on the east | No | Yes |
| Blackstone Hotel (Kimpton Cottonwood Hotel) | 1916 | 302 South 36th Street | Yes | Yes |
| Boys Town | 1917 | 14100 Crawford Street | National Historic Landmark | No |
| Bradford-Pettis House | 1910 | 400 South 39th Street | Yes | Yes |
| Brandeis-Millard House & Carriage House | 1904 | 500 South 38th Street & 3815 Dewey Avenue | Yes | Yes |
| Breckenridge-Gordon House | 1909 | 3611 Jackson Street | No | Yes |
| Broatch Building | 1880 | 1209 Harney Street | No | Yes |
| Broadview Hotel | 1909 | 2060 Florence Boulevard | No | Yes |
| Broomfield Rowhouse | 1913 | 2502 Lake Street | Yes | No |
| Harry Buford House | 1929 | 1804 North 30th Street | No | Yes |
| Burlington Headquarters Building (Burlington Place) | 1879 | 1004 Farnam Street | Yes | Yes |
| Burlington Station | 1898 | 925 South 10th Street | Yes | No |
| Cabanne Archeological Site | 1822 | Located on the Missouri River between Omaha and Fort Calhoun (undisclosed location) | Yes | No |
| Calvin Memorial Presbyterian Church | 1910 | 3105 North 24th Street | Yes | Yes |
| Center School (Omaha, Nebraska) (Lincoln School Apartments) | 1893 | 1730 South 11th Street | Yes | Yes |
| Charles D. McLaughlin House | 1905 | 507 South 38th Street | Yes | No |
| Christian Specht Building | 1888 | 1110 Douglas Street | Yes | Yes |
| Charles Storz House | 1909 | 1901 Wirt Street | No | Yes |
| Columbian School | 1892 | 3819 Jones Street | Yes | Yes |
| Joel N. Cornish House | 1886 | 1404 South 10th Street | Yes | No |
| Country Club Historic District | 1925 | North 50th Street on the east to North 56th Street on the west; from Corby Street on the north to Seward Street on the south | No | Yes |
| General Crook House | 1879 | 5730 North 30th Street | Yes | Yes |
| Dietz Memorial United Methodist Church | 1888 | 1423 South 10th Street; 41.244932°N 95.928882°W | No | Yes |
| Dr. Samuel D. Mercer House | 1885 | 3920 Cuming Street | Yes | No |
| Douglas County Courthouse | 1912 | 1700 Farnam Street | Yes | No |
| Drake Court Apartments and the Dartmore Apartments Historic District | 1916 | Jones Street on the south to St. Marys Avenue on the north; from South 20th Street on the east to South 23rd Street on the west | Yes | Yes |
| Eggerss-O'Flyng Building | 1902 | 801 South 15th Street | Yes | Yes |
| Epeneter House | 1905 | 502 North 40th Street; 41.264069°N 95.973263°W | No | Yes |
| Farnam Building | 1929 | 1613 Farnam Street | Yes | No |
| Federal Office Building (Residence Inn Omaha Downtown) | 1934 | 106 S. 15th St. | Yes | No |
| Field Club Historic District | 1898 | Pacific Avenue on the north to Center Street on the south; South 32nd Avenue on east to South 36th Street on the west | Yes | Yes |
| First National Bank Building | 1917 | Corner of 16th and Farnam street | Yes | No |
| First Unitarian Church of Omaha | 1917 | 3114 Harney Street | Yes | Yes |
| Flatiron Hotel | 1912 | 1722 St. Mary's Avenue | Yes | No |
| Florence | 1846 | Weber Street on the south to I-680 on the north; Pershing Drive on the east to North Ridge Drive on the west | No | Yes |
| Florentine Apartments | 1911 | 907 South 25th Street | No | Yes |
| Ford Hospital (Fifth Avenue Hotel) | 1916 | 121 South 25th Street | Yes | No |
| Fort Omaha Guardhouse | 1883 | Intersection of North 30th and Ellison Avenue | No | Yes |
| Fort Omaha | 1868 | Fort Street on the South to Laurel Avenue on the North; North 30th Street on the east to North 33rd Street on the west | Yes | Yes |
| Franklin School (Robbins School) | 1910 | 4302 South 39th Avenue | Yes | No |
| G.C. Moses Block | 1887 | 1234–1244 South 13th Street | Yes | No |
| Gallagher Building | 1888 | 1902–06 South 13th Street | Yes | Yes |
| Garneau-Kilpatrick House | 1890 | 3100 Chicago Street | Yes | Yes |
| Gen. George Crook House (General George Crook House Museum) | 1879 | 5730 North 30th Street | Yes | No |
| George F. Shepard House | 1903 | 1802 Wirt Street | No | Yes |
| George H. Kelly House | 1904 | 1924 Binney Street | Yes | Yes |
| Georgia Row House (Georgia Apartments) | 1890 | 1040 South 29th Street | Yes | No |
| Gerald R. Ford Birthsite and Gardens | 1913 | 3202 Woolworth Avenue | No | Yes |
| Gold Coast Historic District | 1880 | North 36th Street on the east to North 40th on the west; Jones Street on the north to Cuming Street on the south | Yes | No |
| Goodrich Building | 1900 | 1415 Farnam Street; 41.257326°N 95.935334°W | No | Yes |
| Gottlieb Storz House | 1905 | 3708 Farnam Street | Yes | Yes |
| Grossman Apartments | 1904 | 102-108 South 36th Street; 41.25941°N 95.966741°W | No | Yes |
| Havens-Page House | 1900 | 101 North 39th Street | Yes | No |
| Hicks House | 1892 | 3017 Pacific Street; 41.248561°N 95.958074°W | No | Yes |
| Hicks Terrace | 1890 | 3005-3011 Pacific Street, 1102 South 30th Avenue | No | Yes |
| Hill Hotel (Kensington Tower) | 1919 | 505 South 16th Street | Yes | Yes |
| Holy Family Church | 1883 | 915 North 18th Street | Yes | Yes |
| Horbach Building | 1894 | 1205–1207 Harney Street; 41.256241°N 95.932331°W | No | Yes |
| Hospe Music Warehouse | 1919 | 101 South 10th Street | Yes | No |
| Howard Street Apartment District | 1885 | Harney Street on the north to Landon Court on the south; South 22nd Street on the east to South 24th Street on the west | Yes | No |
| Immaculate Conception Church and School | 1926 | 2708 South 24th Street | Yes | No |
| J.L. Brandeis and Sons Store Building (The Brandeis) | 1906 | 210 South 16th Street | Yes | No |
| Jewell Building | 1923 | 2221 North 24th Street | Yes | Yes |
| Joslyn Castle | 1903 | 3902 Davenport Street | Yes | Yes |
| Keeline Building | 1911 | 319 South 17th Street | Yes | No |
| Keirle House | 1905 | 3017 Mormon Street | No | Yes |
| Kirschbraun and Sons Creamery, Inc. | 1917 | 901 Dodge Street | Yes | No |
| Kuncl-Hruska House | 1889 | 1732 South 15th Street | No | Yes |
| LaCasa Pizza Sign | 1957 | 4432 Leavenworth Street | No | Yes |
| Lincoln Highway (Omaha) | 1913 | North 183 Street and West Dodge Road northwest towards North 192 Street | No | Yes |
| Livestock Exchange Building | 1926 | 4920 South 30th Street | Yes | Yes |
| Lizzie Robinson House | 1910 | 2864 Corby Street | Yes | Yes |
| Malcolm X Housesite | 1925 | 3448 Pinkney Street (house was demolished before listing) | Yes | No |
| Mary Rogers Kimball House | 1906 | 2236 St. Mary's Avenue | Yes | Yes |
| Mason School | 1888 | 1012 South 24th Street | Yes | Yes |
| Mason Terrace & Van Closter Residence | 1889,1890 | 1001 Park Avenue, 2911-21 Mason Street | No | Yes |
| Medlar Building | 1903 | 416 South 14th Street | No | Yes |
| Megeath House | 1924 | 617 North 90th Street | No | Yes |
| Melrose Apartments | 1916 | 602 North 33rd Street | No | Yes |
| Military Road Segment | 1857 | Begins at Nebraska Highway 64 as Nebraska Highway 28K, ends at Bennington Road near North 204th Street | Yes | No |
| Miller Park | 1891 | Saratoga Street on the south to Redick Avenue on the north; Florence Boulevard on the east to North 30th Street on the west | No | No |
| Mormon Pioneer Cemetery | 1846 | 3301 State Street | No | Yes |
| Nash Block (the Greenhouse) | 1907 | 902 Farnam Street | Yes | Yes |
| Neble House | 1894 | 2752 South 10th Street | No | Yes |
| Normandie Apartments | 1898 | 1102 Park Avenue | Yes | Yes |
| Notre Dame Academy and Convent | 1924 | 3501 State Street | Yes | Yes |
| Old Market | 1880 | Harney Street on the north to Jackson Street on the south; South 10th Street on the east to South 13th Street on the west | Yes | Yes |
| Old People's Home (Leo Vaughan Senior Manor | 1917 | 3325 Fontenelle Boulevard | Yes | No |
| Omaha High School (Omaha Central High School) | 1900 | 124 North 20th Street | Yes | Yes |
| Omaha Rail and Commerce Historic District | 1880 | Jackson Street on the north to the Union Pacific main line on the south; South 15th Avenue on the west and 8th Street on the east | Yes | No |
| Omaha Bolt, Nut and Screw Building | 1889 | 1316 Jones Street | Yes | Yes |
| Omaha National Bank Building | 1888 | 1650 Farnam Street | Yes | No |
| Omaha Public Library (building) (Omaha Library Plaza) | 1894 | 1823 Harney Street | Yes | Yes |
| Omaha Quartermaster Depot Historic District | 1881 | Hickory Street on the south to Woolworth Avenue on the north; South 22nd Street on the south to the Union Pacific Railroad Yards on the west | Yes | No |
| Orpheum Theater | 1927 | 409 South 16th Street | Yes | No |
| Packer's National Bank Building | 1907 | 4939 South 24th Street | Yes | Yes |
| Park School | 1918 | 1320 South 29th Street | Yes | Yes |
| Parlin, Orendorff and Martin Plow Company Building | 1906 | 707 South 11th Street | Yes | No |
| Poppleton Block | 1890 | 1001 Farnam Street | Yes | Yes |
| Porter-Thomsen House | 1902 | 3426 Lincoln Boulevard | Yes | Yes |
| Prague Hotel | 1898 | 1402 South 13th Street | Yes | No |
| Prospect Hill Cemetery | 1856 | 3202 Parker Street | No | Yes |
| Redick Tower (The Hotel Deco) | 1930 | 1504 Harney Street | Yes | No |
| Mary Reed House | 1909 | 503 South 36th Street | No | Yes |
| Robinson Memorial Church of God in Christ | 1916 | 2318 North 26th Street | No | Yes |
| Rose Realty-Securities Building | 1916 | 305 South 16th Street | Yes | No |
| Rosewater School (Rosewater Apartments) | 1910 | 3764 South 13th Street | Yes | Yes |
| Sacred Heart Catholic Church Complex | 1902 | 2206 Binney Street | Yes | No |
| Saddle Creek Underpass | 1934 | Dodge Street (US 6) over Saddle Creek Road | Yes | No |
| Saint Joseph Parish Complex | 1886 | 1730 South 16th Street | Yes | Yes |
| Site of Saint Mary's Academy | | | Yes | No |
| St. Cecilia's Cathedral | 1905 | 701 North 40th Street | Yes | Yes |
| St. John's A.M.E. Church | 1943 | 2402 North 22nd Street | Yes | yes |
| St. John's Collegiate Church | 1888 | 2500 California Plaza | No | Yes |
| St. Martin of Tours Episcopal Church | 1899 | 2312 J Street | Yes | Yes |
| St. Philomena's Cathedral and Rectory (St. Frances Cabrini Catholic Church) | 1908–1910 | St. Francis Cabrini Parish, 1335 South 10th Street | Yes | Yes |
| St. Regis Apartments | 1919 | 617 South 37th Street | Yes | No |
| Sanford Hotel | 1916 | 1913 Farnam Street | Yes | Yes |
| Saunders School | 1899 | 415 North 41st Avenue | Yes | No |
| Simon Brothers Company | 1919 | Ford Warehouse, 1024 Dodge Street | Yes | No |
| Slater House | 1890 | 1050 South 32nd Street | No | Yes |
| South Omaha Bridge | 1936 | Located on Hwys 275/92 over the Missouri River | Yes | No |
| South Omaha Main Street Historic District | 1883 | South 24th Street between M Street on the north and O Street on the south | Yes | No |
| Springwell Danish Cemetery | 1889 | 6326 Hartman Avenue | No | Yes |
| Standard Oil Company Building of Nebraska | 1921 | 500 South 18th Street | Yes | No |
| Steiner Rowhouse No. 1 | 1909 | 638-42 South 19th Street | Yes | No |
| Steiner Rowhouse No. 2 | 1911 | 1906–10 Jones Street | Yes | No |
| Strehlow Terrace (Ernie Chambers Court) | 1905 | 2024 North Sixteenth Street | Yes | No |
| Swartz Printing Company Building | 1910 | 714 South 15th Street | Yes | Yes |
| Swoboda Bakery | 1889 | 1422 William Street | Yes | No |
| The Berkeley Apartments | 1915 | 649-51 South 19th Street | Yes | No |
| The Melrose | 1916 | 602 North 33rd Street | Yes | No |
| The Sherman | 1897 | 2501 North 16th Street | Yes | No |
| Thomas Kilpatrick House | 1890 | 3100 Chicago Street | No | Yes |
| Trans-Mississippi Exposition Site | 1898 | 1920 Pinkney Street | No | Yes |
| Trinity Cathedral | 1880 | 113 N. 18th Street | Yes | No |
| Union Passenger Terminal (Durham Museum) | 1931 | 801 South 10th Street | Yes | No |
| Union State Bank Building | 1927 | 1904 Farnam Street | No | Yes |
| USS Hazard | 1944 | 2497 Freedom Park Road | National Historic Landmark | No |
| USS Marlin | 1952 | 2497 Freedom Park Road | Yes | No |
| Vinton School | 1907 | 2120 Deer Park Boulevard | Yes | Yes |
| Vinton Street Commercial Historic District | 1890s | Along Vinton Street between Elm Street on the west and South 17th Street on the east | No | Yes |
| Wattles House | 1895 | 320 South 37th Street | No | Yes |
| Weber Mill (Winter Quarters Mill Museum and ArtLoft Gallery) | 1846 | 9102 North 30th Street | Yes | Yes |
| Webster Telephone Exchange Building (Great Plains Black History Museum) | 1906 | 2213 Lake Street | Yes | No |
| West Central-Cathedral Landmark District | 1880s | North 38th Street between Capitol Avenue on the south and Cuming Street on the north | No | Yes |
| West Farnam Apartments | 1912 | 3817 Dewey Avenue | No | Yes |
| Zabriskie House | 1889 | 3524 Hawthorne Avenue | Yes | Yes |
| The House of Marlon Brando | 1900 | 1026 S. 32nd St | No | Yes |
| The House of Montgomery Clift | 1910 | 2101 S. 33rd St | No | Yes |

== Former Landmarks ==
Being listed on the NRHP or as an Omaha Landmark does not permanently protect buildings against destruction. Several landmarks in Omaha have been demolished through a variety of fashions.

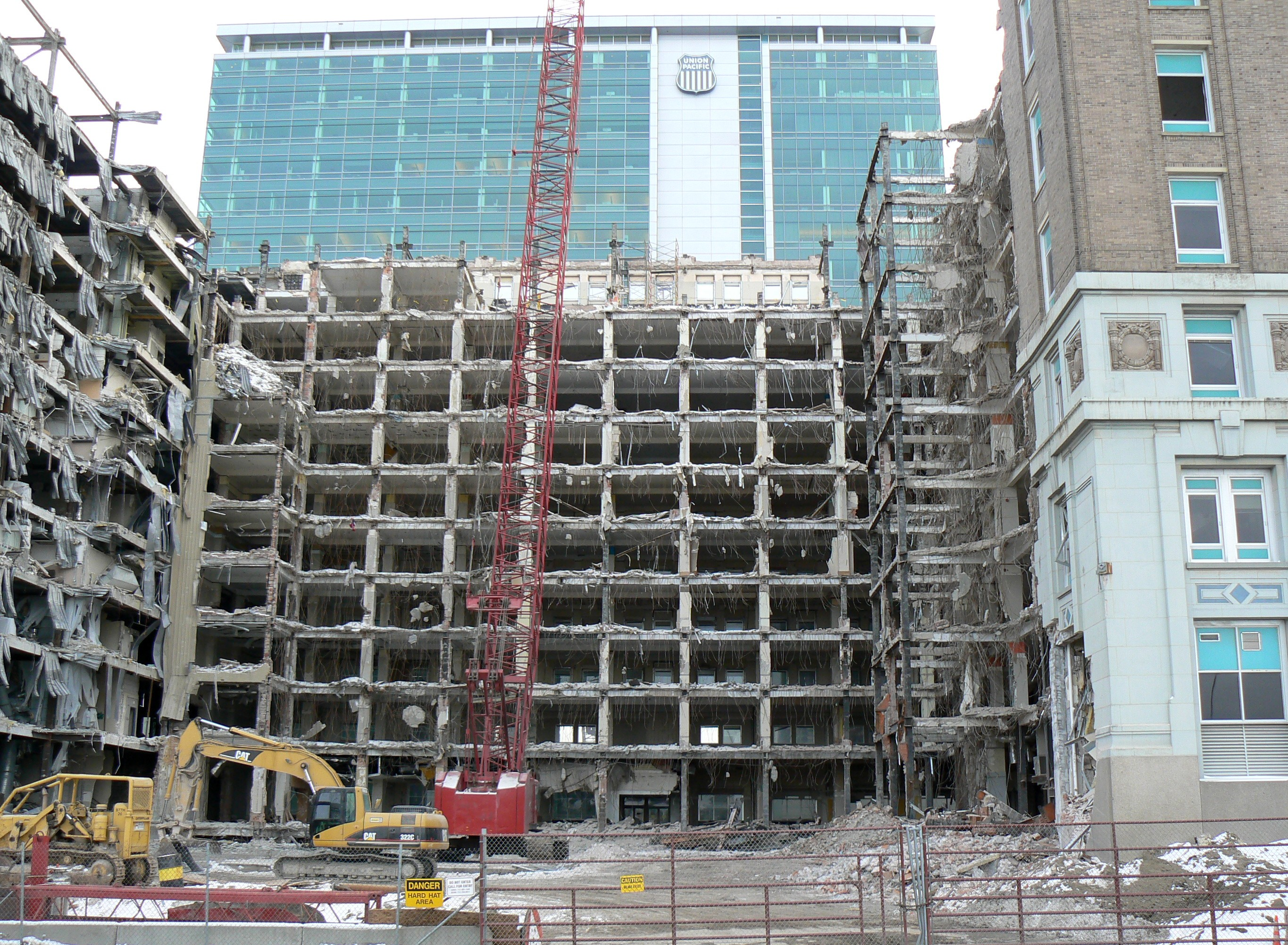
Demolition of the Old Union Pacific Headquarters in Downtown Omaha in fall 2008.

| Name | Location | Built | Destroyed | Notes |
|---|---|---|---|---|
| Clarinda & Page Apartments | 1027 Farnam Street, 305-11 Turner Boulevard | 1909 | 2014 | Demolished by the Mutual of Omaha, now an empty lot. |
| Monmouth Park School | 4508 North 33rd Street | 1903 | 1995 | Declared a health and safety hazard and razed. |
| Guy C. Barton House | 3522 Farnam St | 1899 | 1982 | Destroyed in a fire |
| Jobbers' Canyon Historic District | Downtown Omaha | Various | 1989 | Removed from the NRHP after buildings were demolished. It was located at Farnam Street on the north to Jackson Street on the south; South Eighth Street on the east to South Tenth Street on the west |
| Kennedy Building | 1517 Jackson Street | 1910 | | Still Stands |
| Leone, Florentine and Carpathia Apartment Buildings | 907-911 South 25 Street | 1909 | | Florentine Apartment Building still stands |
| The Berkeley Apartments | 907-911 South 25 Street | 1909 | | Still Stands |
| Butternut Building | 714-716 South 10th Street, Omaha, Nebraska | 1909 | 2004 | Destroyed by a fire. |

== See also ==
- List of Registered Historic Places in Douglas County, Nebraska
- Architecture in Omaha, Nebraska
- History of Omaha
- Founding figures of Omaha, Nebraska
- Thomas Rogers Kimball
- John Latenser, Sr.
- J.P. Guth
