= Clarinda & Page Apartments =

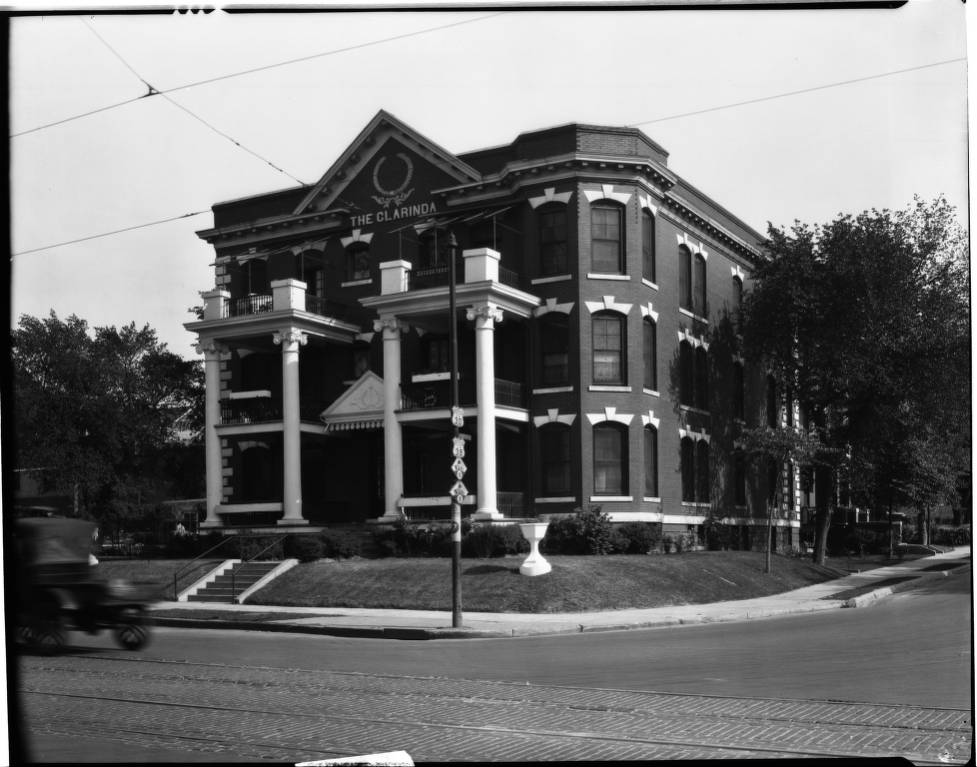
- The Clarinda in May 1927

- Location within Nebraska Location within the United States
- 41°15′27″N 95°57′27″W
- Location: Omaha, Nebraska

History
- Built: Clarinda: 1909; Page: 1914 Demolished 2014

Site notes
- Architect: W.W.Welch
- Architectural style: Georgian Revival Style
- Owner: Turner Park LLC

Omaha Landmark
- Designated: April 21, 1981 Rescinded July 2014

The Clarinda and Page Apartments were a pair of historic apartment buildings in the Midtown area of Omaha, Nebraska, United States. The Clarinda Apartments was built in 1909 at 3027 Farnam Street, while the Page Apartments was built in 1914 at 305–11 Turner Boulevard. They both reflected the Georgian Revival style of architecture and were designated as an Omaha Landmark by the Landmarks Heritage Preservation Commission on April 21, 1981.

Both apartment buildings were demolished by Mutual of Omaha in 2014 after a failed campaign to save it. They had been eligible for inclusion on the National Register of Historic Places due to their architectural significance, but were never listed.

== See also ==
- Landmarks in Omaha, Nebraska
