= Fort Omaha Guardhouse =

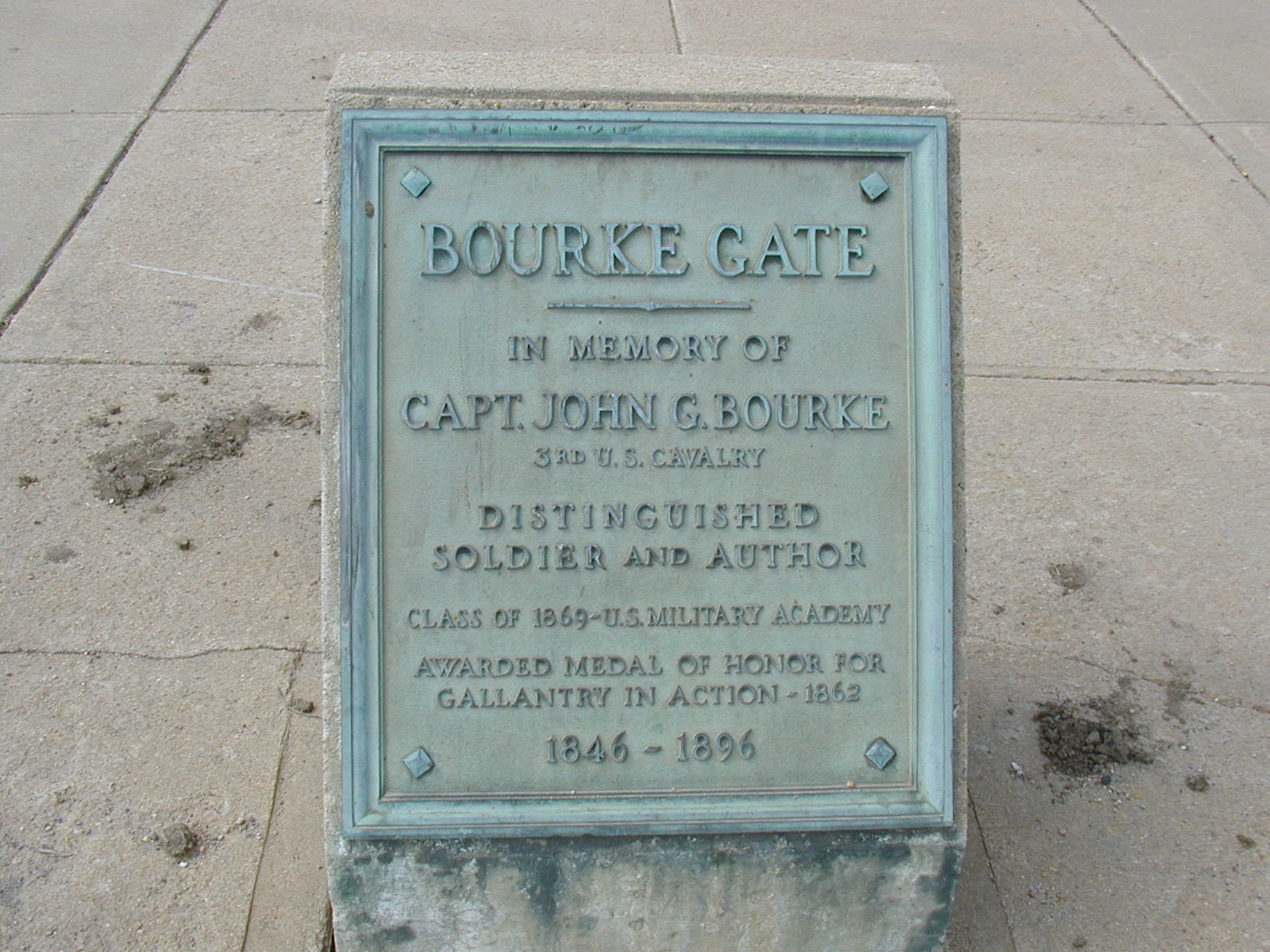
- Bourke Gate commemorative plaque located near guardhouse

- Location within Nebraska Location within the United States
- 41°18′25″N 95°57′26″W
- Location: Omaha, Nebraska

History
- Built: 1883

Omaha Landmark
- Designated: July 6, 1982

The Fort Omaha Guardhouse was built in 1883 to handle Native American, civilian and military prisoners of the Department of the Platte housed at Fort Omaha. Located at 5700 North 30th Street in north Omaha, Nebraska, the Guardhouse was named an Omaha Landmark by the City of Omaha Landmarks Heritage Preservation Commission in 1982. It is also a contributing property to the Fort Omaha Historic District, which is listed on the National Register of Historic Places.

== About ==
Placed by the front gates, the Fort Omaha Guardhouse was built as part of a design typical of western United States military forts in the 19th century. Originally constructed as a large L-shaped building, the rear or east wing of the building, closest to North 30th Street, was dissected from the building around 1914. It was used as a storage facility for many years, and the main section of the guardhouse was converted to offices.

Big Spotted Horse was captive there in the 1880s. The most famous prisoner of the guardhouse was Ponca Chief Standing Bear during the trial of Standing Bear v. Crook. When General Crook visited him at the Guardhouse he was appalled by the terrible conditions Standing Bear and his tribal members were staying in.

Several other prisoners, including Army deserters, were housed there over the next forty years. There were also several prisoners who were land jumpers that claimed stakes in the Black Hills before 1875.

== See also ==
- History of Omaha
