= Vinton School =

- U.S. National Register of Historic Places
- Omaha Landmark
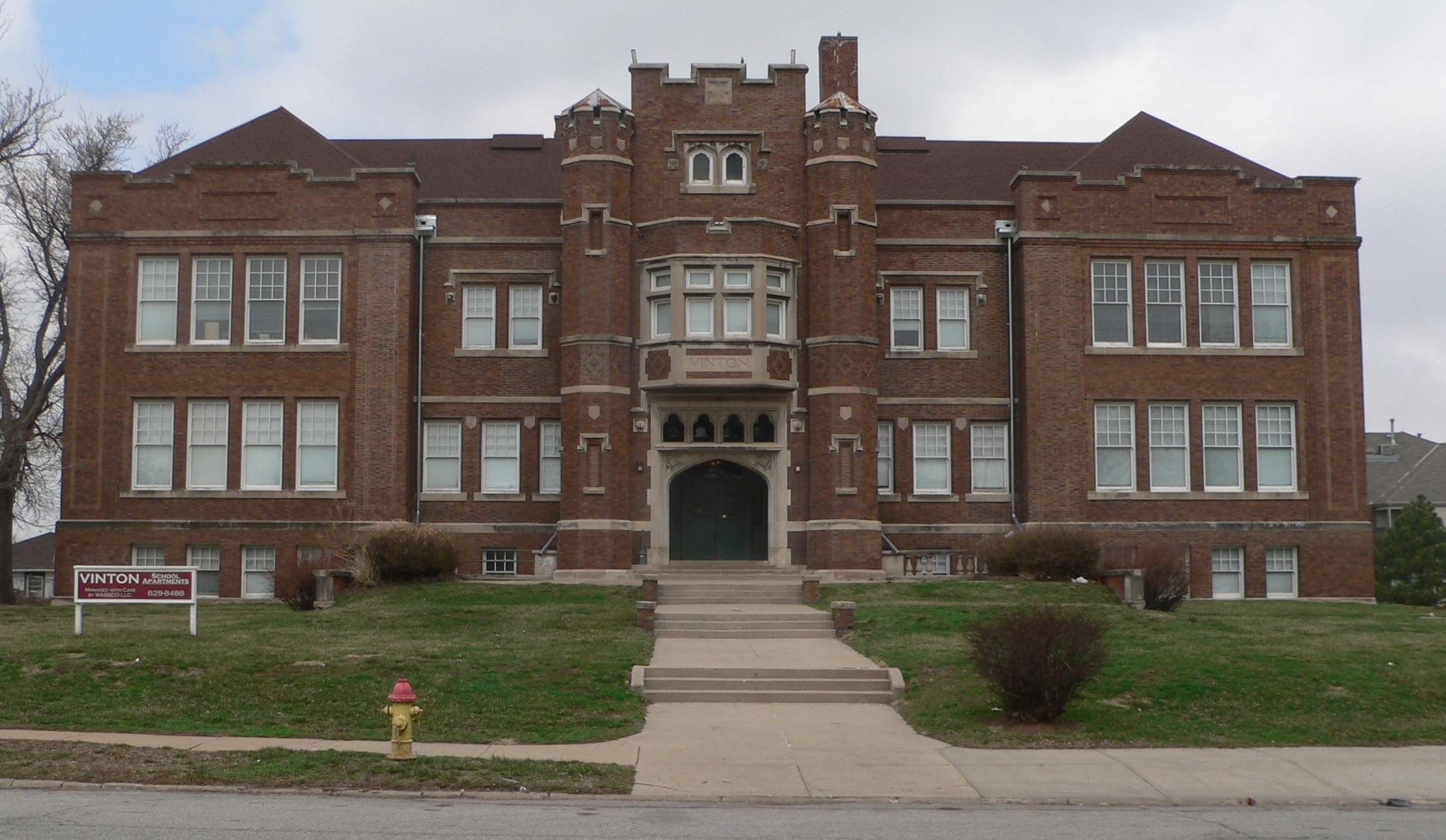
- Vinton School Apartments

- Location within Nebraska Location within the United States
- Location: 2120 Deer Park Boulevard, Omaha, Nebraska
- Coordinates: 41°13′43.03″N 95°56′40.27″W
- Built: 1908
- Architect: Frederick W. Clarke
- Architectural style: Tudor Revival
- NRHP reference No.: 89002045

Significant dates
- Added to NRHP: November 29, 1989
- Designated OMAL: June 12, 1990

Vinton School was built as a fourteen-room elementary school in 1908 at 2120 Deer Park Boulevard in the Deer Park neighborhood of Omaha, Nebraska, United States. Designed by Omaha architect Frederick W. Clarke, Vinton School is the earliest and most elaborate example of a Tudor Revival-style school in Omaha. Designated an Omaha Landmark in June 1990, the building was listed on the National Register of Historic Places in November 1989.

== About ==
Designed in the Tudor Revival style, the Vinton School was built as a two-story brick structure on a rectangular floor plan. Using a technical system of load-bearing walls to support floors of wood joist construction, the building includes a series of hipped roofs.

Rehabilitated into an apartment building in 1990, the building maintains the original exterior features.

The building's architect, Frederick W. Clarke, was also responsible for designing six other schools in the Omaha Public Schools district, including Tech High.

== See also ==
- Vinton Street Commercial Historic District
- History of Omaha
