= Robbins School =

- Franklin School
- U.S. National Register of Historic Places
- Omaha Landmark
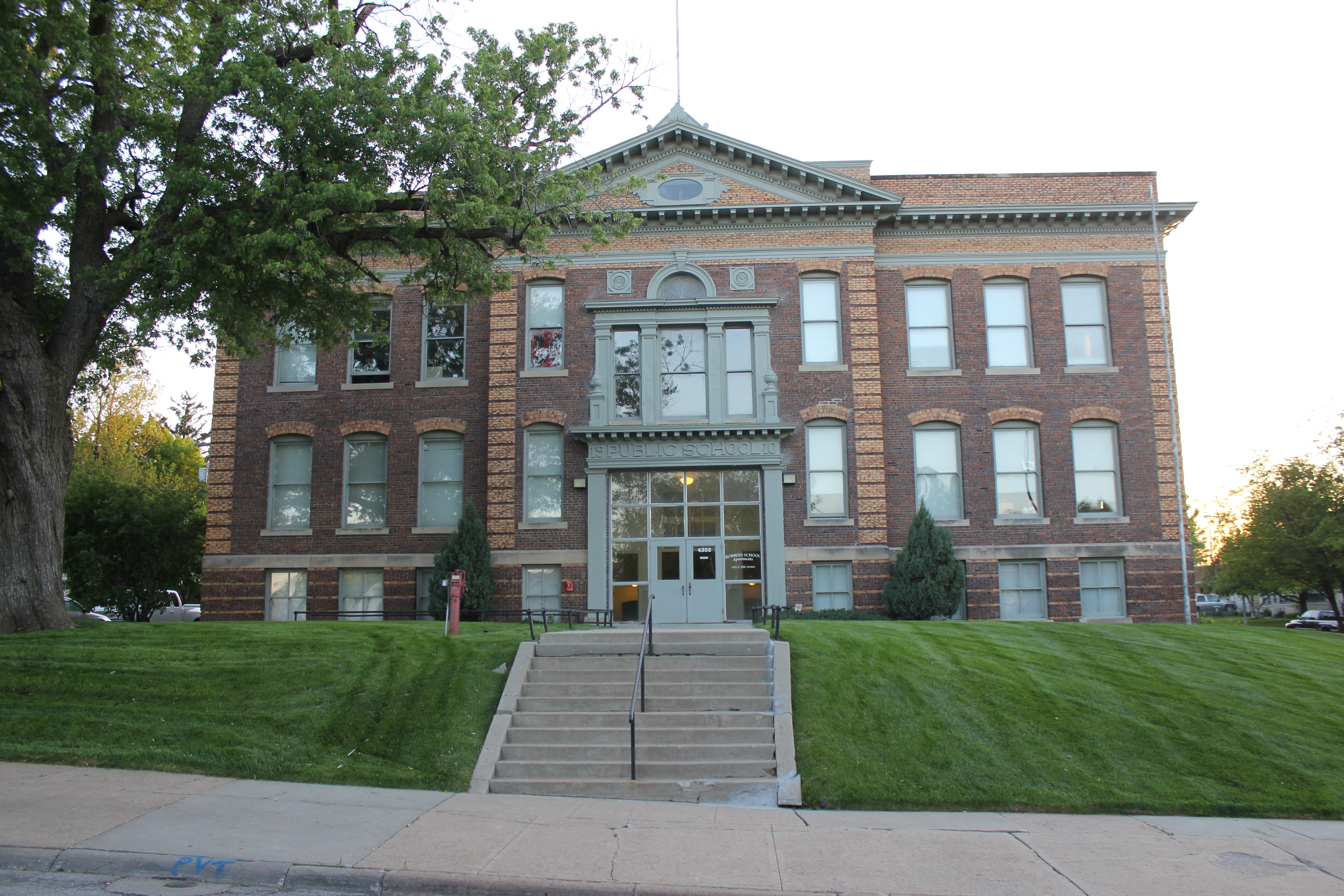

- Location within Nebraska Location within the United States
- Location: Omaha, Nebraska
- Coordinates: 41°12′59.14″N 95°58′21.27″W
- Built: 1910
- Architectural style: Classical Revival
- NRHP reference No.: 98000070

Significant dates
- Added to NRHP: February 5, 1998
- Designated OMAL: January 13, 1998

The Robbins School, originally called Franklin School, is located at 4302 South 39th Avenue in South Omaha, Nebraska, United States. It was built in 1910 to serve a newly established and growing Polish community in south Omaha. A 2000 rehabilitation converted the former school to rental residential use.

A pedimented central portico, pilasters, Palladian window and detailed cornice make Robbins School one of the best Neoclassical Revival style buildings remaining in Omaha. After closing in 1994, the building was renovated in the 1990s and converted into apartments.

The building was originally named Franklin School. In 1928 two local boys whose last name was Robbins rushed into their burning house to save their invalid mother. One of the boys died in his heroic attempt. The second survived, only to be killed later in the same year in an unrelated sledding accident.
