= Melrose Apartments (Omaha, Nebraska) =

- The Melrose
- U.S. National Register of Historic Places
- Omaha Landmark
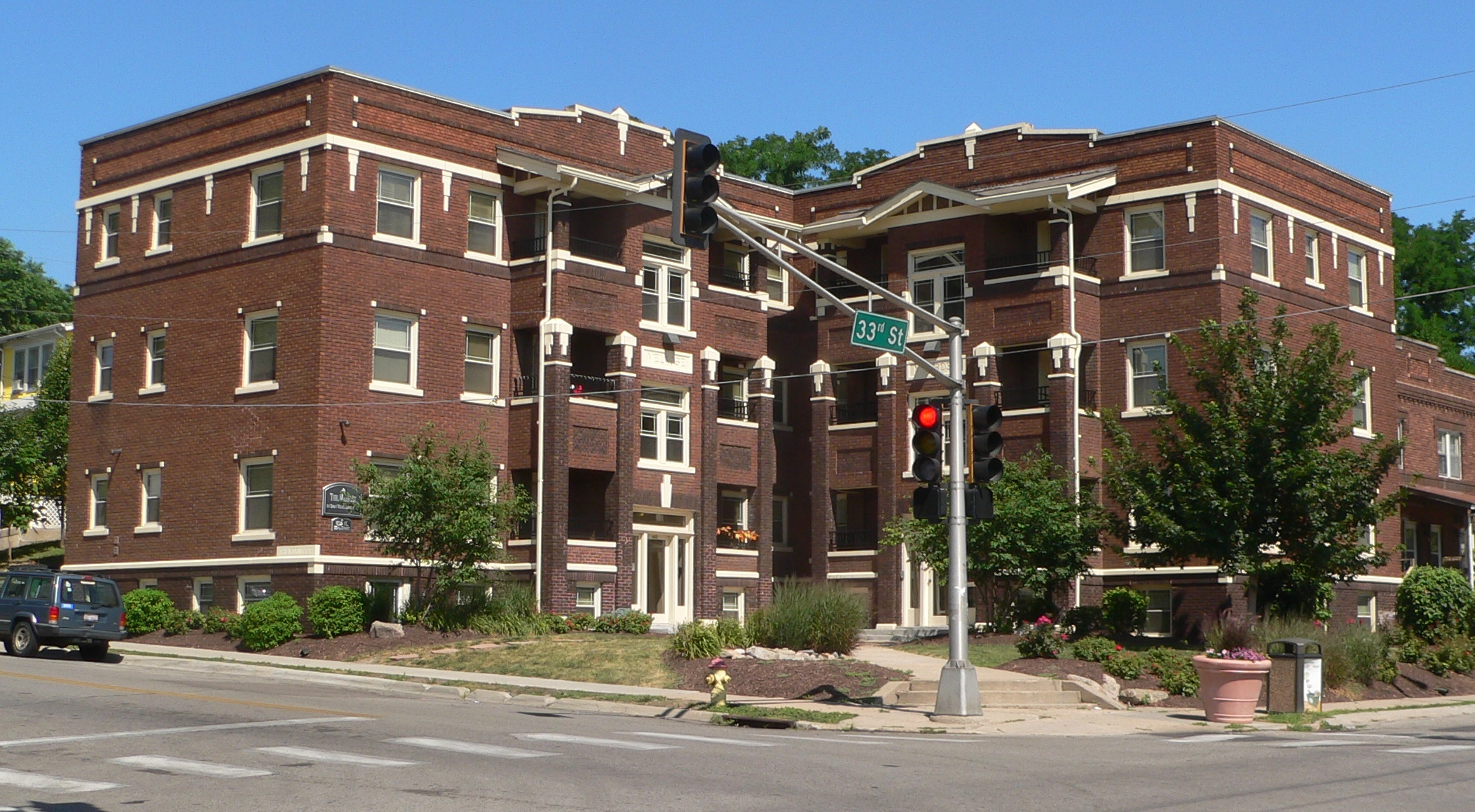
- View from the southeast

- Location within Nebraska Location within the United States
- Location: Omaha, Nebraska
- Coordinates: 41°15′55.53″N 95°57′43.08″W
- Built: 1916
- Architect: H.D. Frankfurt, Alex Beck
- NRHP reference No.: 89002044

Significant dates
- Added to NRHP: November 29, 1989
- Designated OMAL: March 17, 1992

The Melrose Apartments were built in 1916 at 602 North 33rd Street in the Gifford Park neighborhood of Omaha, Nebraska. The Melrose was listed on the National Register of Historic Places in 1989.

== About ==
A three-story, L-shaped building, the Melrose was completed during Omaha's first apartment "boom" period from 1912 to 1917.

Two separate three-story buildings are positioned adjacent to each other in an L-shape with a large courtyard between the buildings. Both buildings are made of brown brick with identical limestone and darker brown brick detailing, with the west building being larger than the north one. There are balconies flanking each building's entryway with "The Melrose" inscribed above.

The Melrose was rehabilitated in 1991, with virtually no alterations to the exterior and only minor changes in the interior.

== See also ==
- History of North Omaha, Nebraska
- Architecture of North Omaha, Nebraska
