= Breckenridge–Gordon House =

Historic house in Nebraska, United States

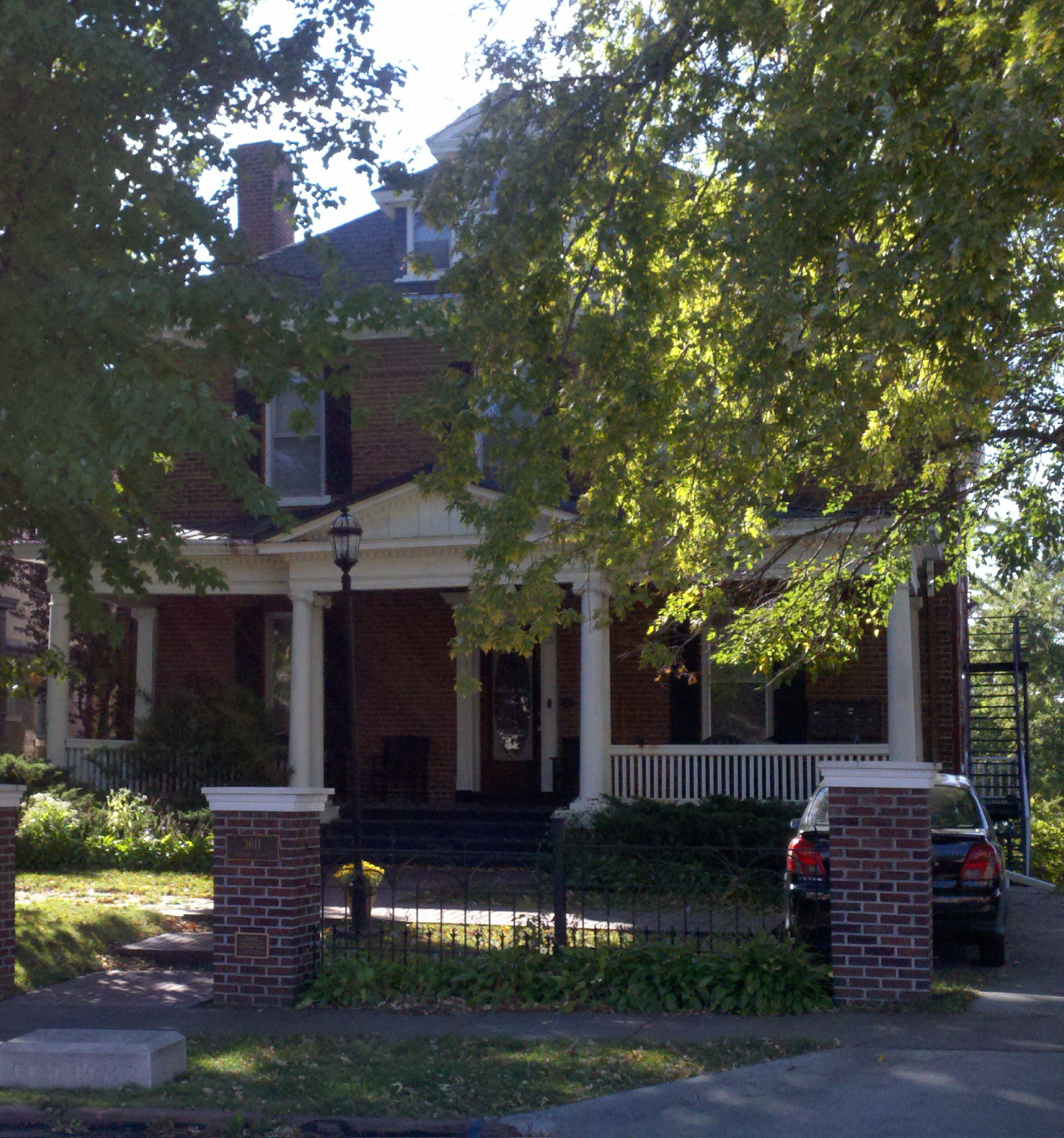
- Breckenridge–Gordon House

- Location within Nebraska Location within the United States
- 41°15′16″N 95°58′01″W
- Location: Omaha, Nebraska

History
- Built: 1909

Omaha Landmark
- Designated: July 6, 1982

The Breckenridge–Gordon House is located at 3611 Jackson Street in Midtown Omaha, Nebraska. Built in 1905, the house was designed by Thomas Rogers Kimball for a prominent local attorney. Designated as an Omaha Landmark in 1982, the residence is located in the Gold Coast Historic District, which is listed on the National Register of Historic Places.

Designed in the Georgian Revival style, the brick structure has three stories, an elegant front porch with a pediment and embellished Ionic columns. When the original owner was killed in an automobile accident, his daughter's new husband moved into the home. The Gordons sold it in 1947, and it was converted to apartments soon afterward.
