= Charles D. McLaughlin House =

Historic house in Nebraska, United States

- U.S. National Register of Historic Places
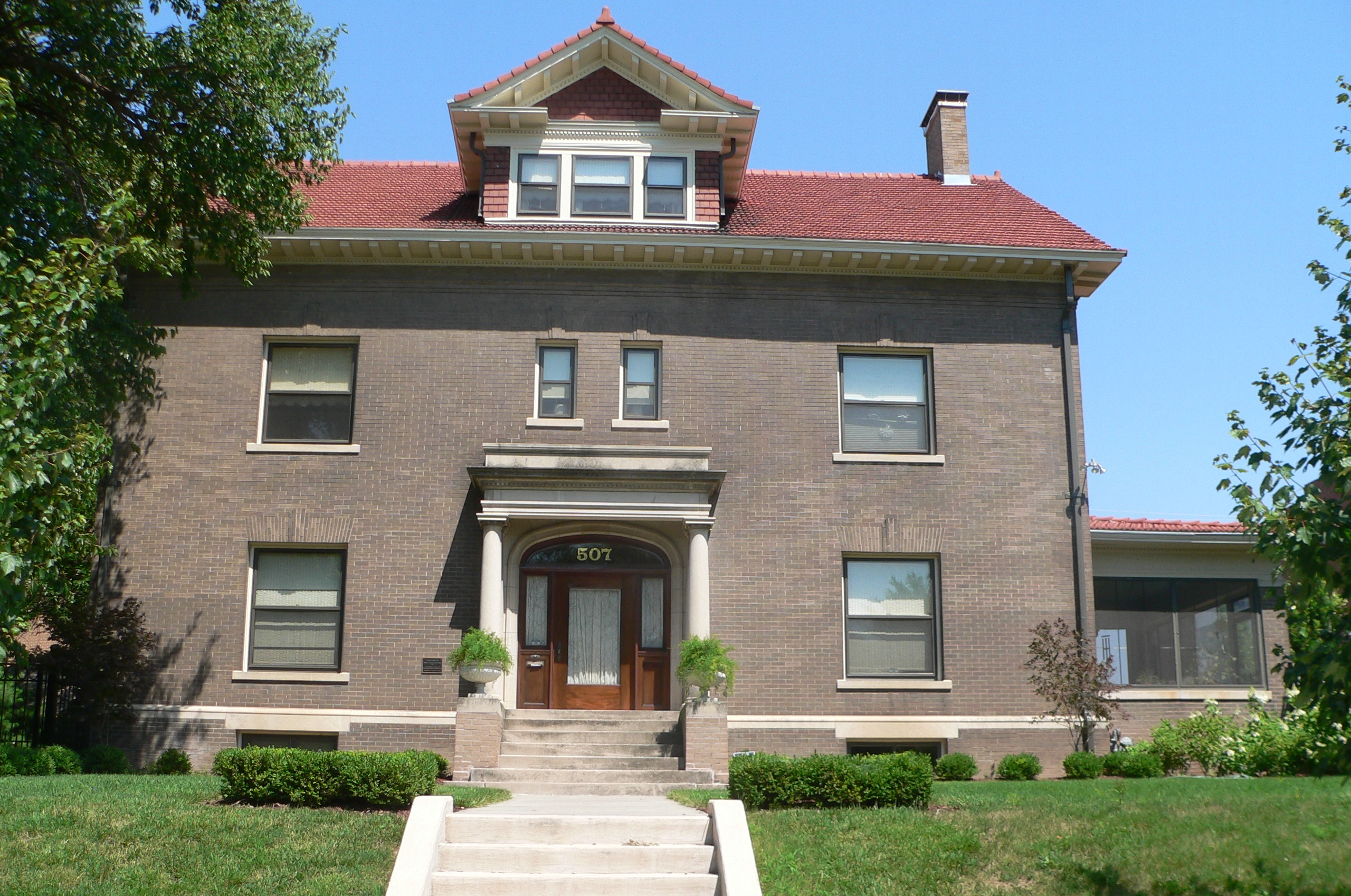
- McLaughlin house, seen from 38th Street

- Location within Nebraska Location within the United States
- Location: 507 South 38th Street, Omaha, Nebraska
- Coordinates: 41°15′20″N 95°58′7″W
- Built: 1905
- Architect: John McDonald
- Architectural style: Colonial Revival
- NRHP reference No.: 82000605
- Added to NRHP: November 8, 1982

The Charles D. McLaughlin House is located in the Gold Coast Historic District of Midtown Omaha, Nebraska. Designed in the Colonial Revival Style by noted Omaha architect John McDonald, it was built in 1905. The City of Omaha designated it an Omaha Landmark on March 16, 1982, and it was listed on the National Register of Historic Places in November of that same year.
