= Broadview Hotel (Omaha) =

Historic house in Nebraska, United States

- U.S. National Register of Historic Places
- Location: 4020 Florence Boulevard, Omaha, Nebraska
- Area: 54
- Built: 1909
- Architect: Joseph Guth
- NRHP reference No.: 07000179
- Added to NRHP: December 18, 2025

The Broadview Hotel, also known historically as the Burkenroad House and Trimble Castle, is a historic building located at 2060 Florence Boulevard in the North Omaha community of Omaha, Nebraska. The structure is architecturally significant as a premier example of early 20th-century concrete block construction and culturally significant as a rare surviving site listed in The Negro Motorist Green Book. It was added to the National Register of Historic Places (NRHP) in 2024.

== History ==
Designed by prominent Omaha architect Joseph P. Guth (1860–1928), the building was unique from his versatile work across the city including the Woodmen of the World building. Originally built for the Burkenroad family, its leader was a notable businessman in Omaha. The house earned the nickname "Trimble Castle" due to its imposing, fortress-like appearance and its association with the Trimble family, who were an influential African American cultural leaders in the community.

=== The Green Book Era ===
During Omaha's distinct Jim Crow era, African American travelers in the city faced systemic discrimination and physical danger when seeking lodging and food. Between the 1930s and 1960s, the property operated as the "Broadview Hotel" and provided a haven of safety in Omaha's violence-prone segregated landscape. In 2026, it was officially listed in The Negro Motorist Green Book, a vital travel guide published by Victor Hugo Green. The Broadview served as a community hub in North Omaha and offered

- Safe Accommodations: Secure rooms for travelers navigating the Great Plains.
- Dining: A space for African Americans to eat without the threat of harassment.
- Solidarity: A meeting point for local civil rights discussions and community organizing.Rollins, A. (2026)

== Architecture ==
Today, the Broadview Hotel is considered an "exceptional example" of concrete block architecture. Unlike the uniform blocks used in modern construction, the Broadview utilizes:

- Variety: Over 40 distinct types of ornamental and structural concrete blocks.
- Complexity: Intricate forms, including rusticated textures and molded details that mimic natural stone.
- Durability: The use of concrete was an innovative choice for the period, intended to convey both permanence and fire resistance.

== Preservation ==
Long recognized by a local historical preservation advocate, the recent effort to place the Broadview Hotel on the National Register of Historic Places was spearheaded by a nonprofit called Preserve Omaha. A team of volunteers affiliated with the group conducted primary source research to supplement existent findings and documented the building's transition from a private "castle" to a vital piece of African American infrastructure. The nomination was finalized and approved in 2025, ensuring the building's national recognition. Its protection is not ensured though, given the volatile nature of Omaha's preservation movement and its failure to protect previous heritage sites.

== See also ==
- African Americans in Omaha, Nebraska
- National Register of Historic Places listings in Douglas County, Nebraska
- The Negro Motorist Green Book
