= Page Brothers Building =

- U.S. National Register of Historic Places
- Chicago Landmark
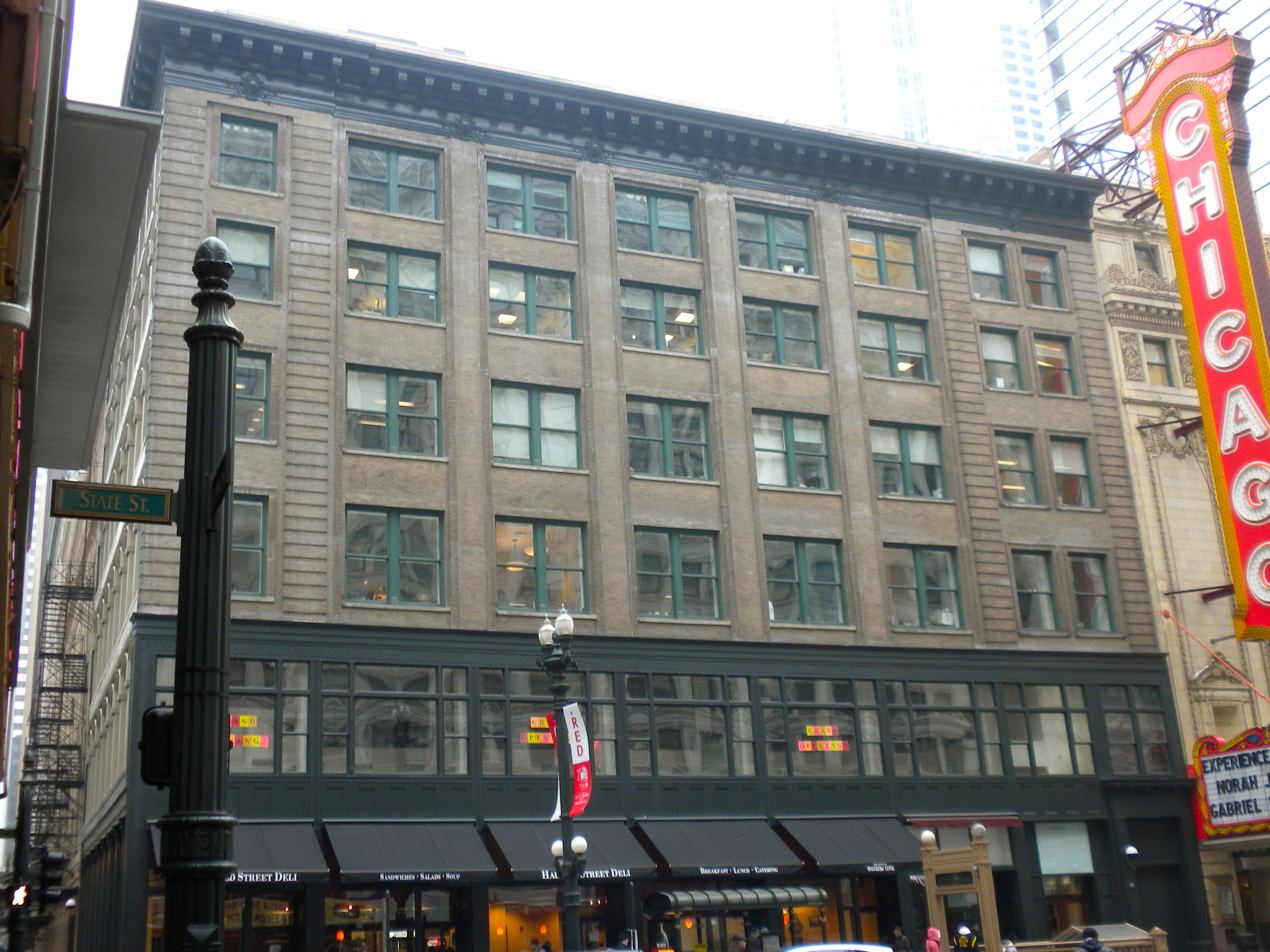

- Location within Illinois
- Location: Chicago, IL
- Coordinates: 41°53′7.78″N 87°37′38.88″W
- Built: 1872
- Architect: John M. Van Osdel, D.D. Badger
- NRHP reference No.: 75000649

Significant dates
- Added to NRHP: June 5, 1975
- Designated CHICL: January 28, 1983

The Page Brothers Building is a commercial building at 177-91 North State Street in the Loop community area of Chicago, Illinois, United States. The north facade, facing Lake Street, features the city's last remaining cast iron front. Although this example was built after the 1871 Great Chicago Fire, iron facades were a common construction technique before the fire, and many of the iron fronts melted due to the intense heat. The original 5-story structure was built by John Mills Van Osdel, a prominent post-Fire architect known for buildings in the Jewelers Row District and Old Main at the University of Arkansas. In 1902, the west facade facing State Street was remodeled and another floor was added, reflecting the reorientation of commercial activity from Lake to State Street.

The building was listed on the National Register of Historic Places on June 5, 1975, and was later designated a Chicago Landmark on January 28, 1983. The Page Brothers Building stands next to the Chicago Theatre, another Chicago Landmark whose marquee is a Chicago cultural and physical landmark that commonly appears in film, television, artwork, and photography.

== See also ==
- Chicago Landmark
- National Register of Historic Places listings in Central Chicago
- Christian Specht Building
