= John P. Bay House =

Historic house in Omaha, Nebraska

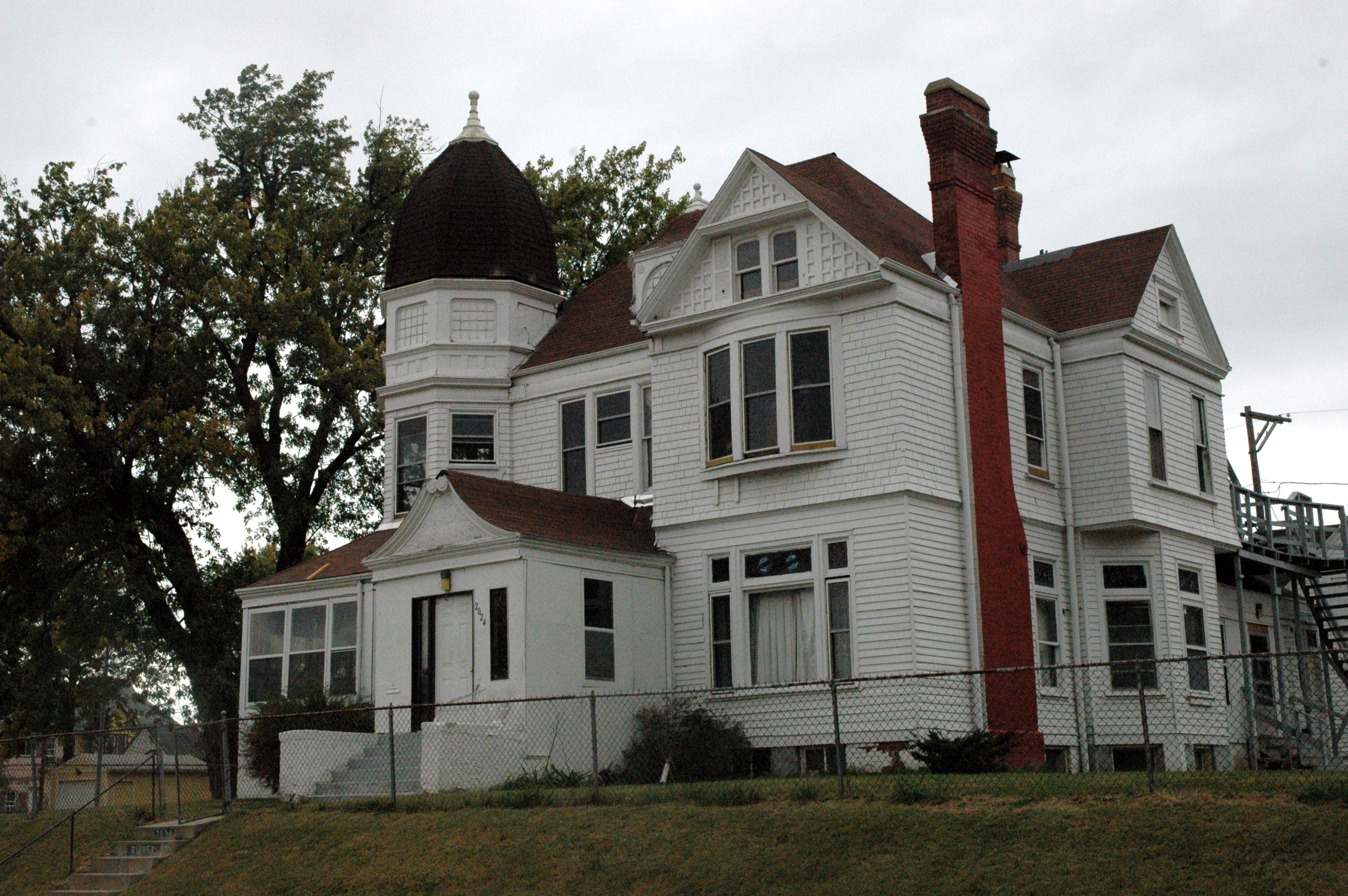
- John P. Bay House

- Location within Nebraska
- 41°17′11″N 95°56′37″W
- Location: Omaha, Nebraska

History
- Built: 1887

Omaha Landmark
- Designated: March 17, 1981

The John P. Bay House is located at 2024 Binney Street in the Kountze Place neighborhood of North Omaha, Nebraska. Built in 1887 by George L. Fisher, the house was designed in the Queen Anne style. It was designated an Omaha Landmark by the City of Omaha in 1981.

== History ==
The house's first owner, John P. Bay, was a co-founder and owner of an ice company that supplied to the railroads, breweries and packing houses of the Midwest. Later the house was owned by Thomas A. Fry, one of the original organizers of Ak-Sar-Ben in 1895.

== See also ==
- Architecture in North Omaha, Nebraska
- History of North Omaha
- Landmarks in Omaha
