= Gallagher Building =

- U.S. National Register of Historic Places
- Omaha Landmark
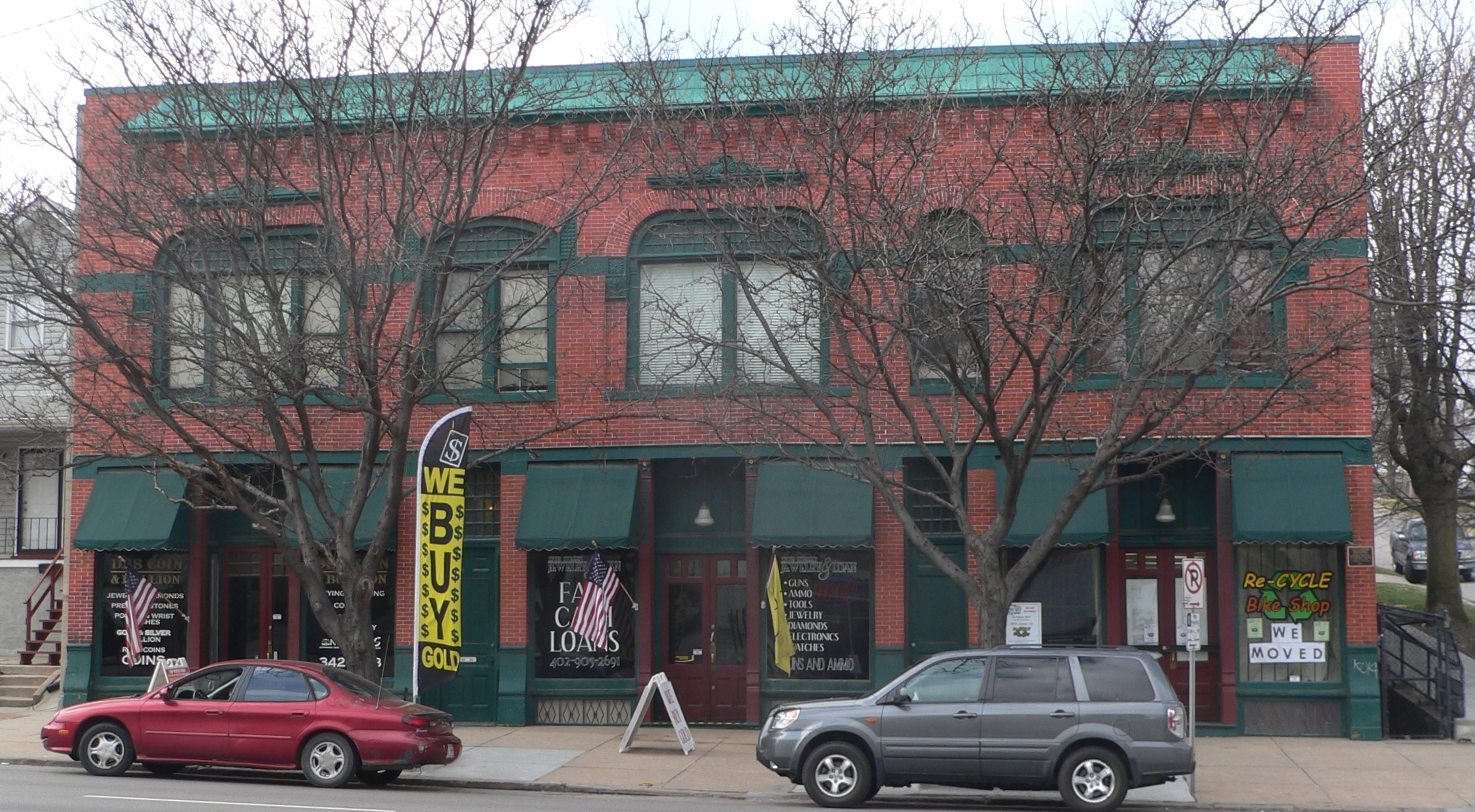
- Gallagher building, seen across 13th Street

- Location within Nebraska Location within the United States
- Location: 1902–06 South 13th Street, Omaha, Nebraska
- Coordinates: 41°14′28.36″N 95°56′0.74″W
- Built: 1888
- Architect: Warren Dutcher; Bickel & Son
- Architectural style: Late Victorian
- NRHP reference No.: 94000653

Significant dates
- Added to NRHP: July 1, 1994
- Designated OMAL: May 10, 1994

The Gallagher Building is a historic commercial building located in Downtown Omaha, Nebraska. It was completed in 1888 in the Late Victorian style of architecture.
