= Christian Specht Building =

Historic building in Omaha, Nebraska

- Specht, Christian, Building
- U.S. National Register of Historic Places
- Omaha Landmark
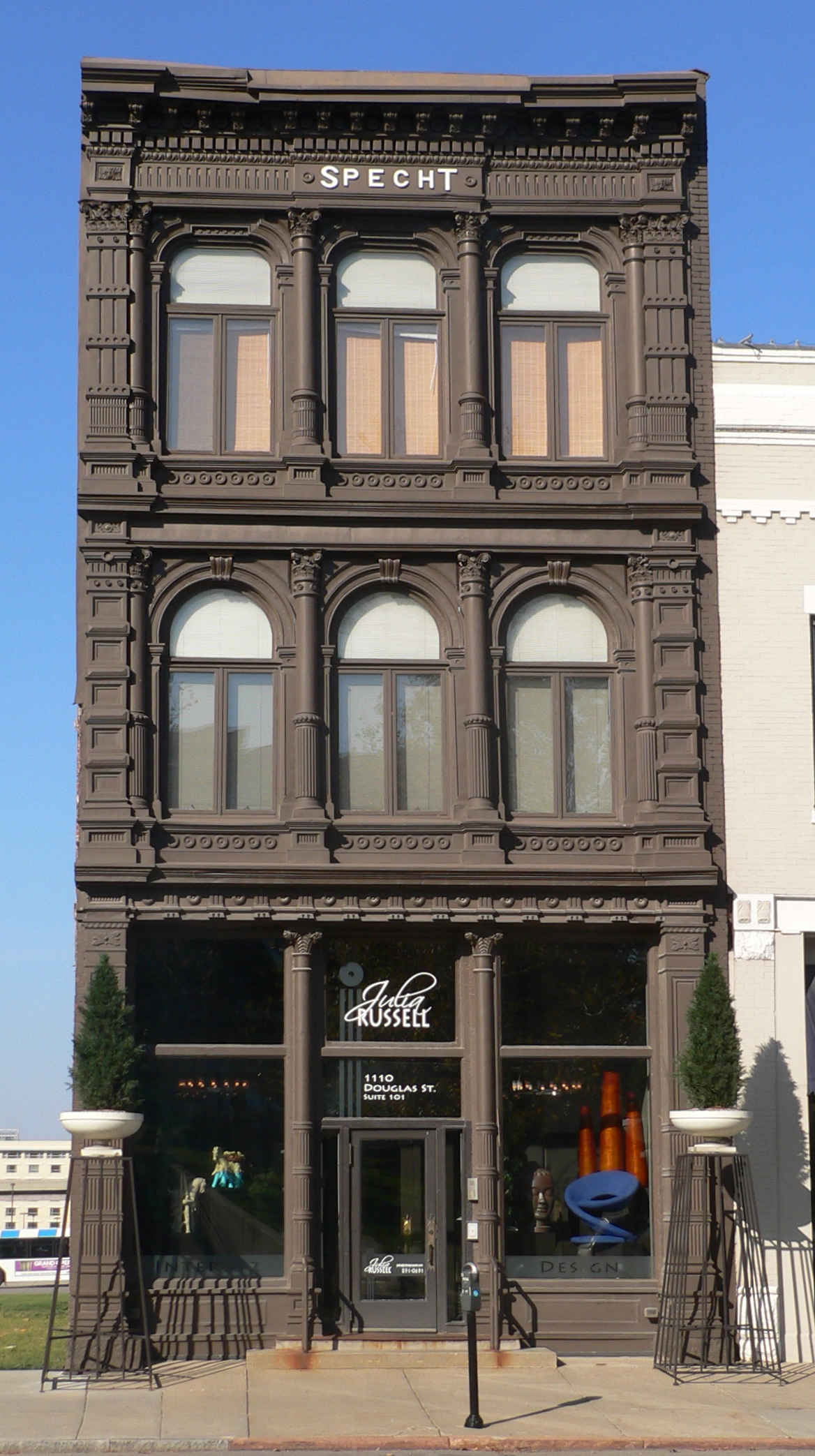
- The Christian Specht Building in 2012
- Location: Omaha, Nebraska, U.S.
- Coordinates: 41.258936011946325°N 95.93109435638956°W
- Built: 1884
- Architect: Durfene & Mendelssohn; Western Cornice Works
- Architectural style: Italian Renaissance Revival
- NRHP reference No.: 77000828

Significant dates
- Added to NRHP: September 19, 1977
- Designated OMAL: January 6, 1981

The Christian Specht Building is located at 1110 Douglas Street in Downtown Omaha, Nebraska, United States. It is the only existing building with a cast-iron facade known in Nebraska today, and one of the few ever built in the state. It was built in 1884 for Western Cornice Works, and is named for its founder, Christian Specht. The building was deemed an Omaha landmark in 1981, and was listed on the National Register of Historic Places in 1977.

== History ==
The Christian Specht Building was built in 1884 for Western Cornice Works, which was itself formed by Christian Specht. It was a commercial building used by the company for office space after Specht left his company in Cincinnati, Ohio in 1880. The building was notable for its usage of a cast-iron facade. The building was added to the National Register of Historic Places on September 19, 1977. Four years later, on January 6, 1981, it was deemed an Omaha Landmark.

In 2001, Omaha Performing Arts announced the construction of the Holland Performing Arts Center as its headquarters and as a performance arts space. Omaha Performing Arts had attempted to turn the entire block into green space, which would have required the demolition of the Christian Specht Building and surrounding properties. Due to its historic status, and its listing on the NRHP, the decision was heavily criticized by the public, with the organization later agreeing to keep the building temporarily.

In 2016, the Christian Specht Building was again threatened with demolition. Omaha Performing Arts claimed that there was a parking crisis and wanted to build a parking garage and additional expansion on the site of the building. Plans again received extensive opposition and criticism from the public and then Omaha mayor-Jean Stothert. Omaha Performing Arts later cancelled the parking garage plan the following year.

== Architecture ==
The Christian Specht Building is a three story-tall building designed using the Italian Renaissance Revival style of architecture. It was built using a cast-iron facade and is the only one of its kind left in the state of Nebraska. Additionally, it was one of only few ever built in the state. The building was designed by local architects Dufrene and Mendelssohn.

== See also ==
- Page Brothers Building
