= Leone, Florentine and Carpathia Apartment Buildings =

- Leone, Florentine, and Carpathia Apartment Buildings
- U.S. National Register of Historic Places
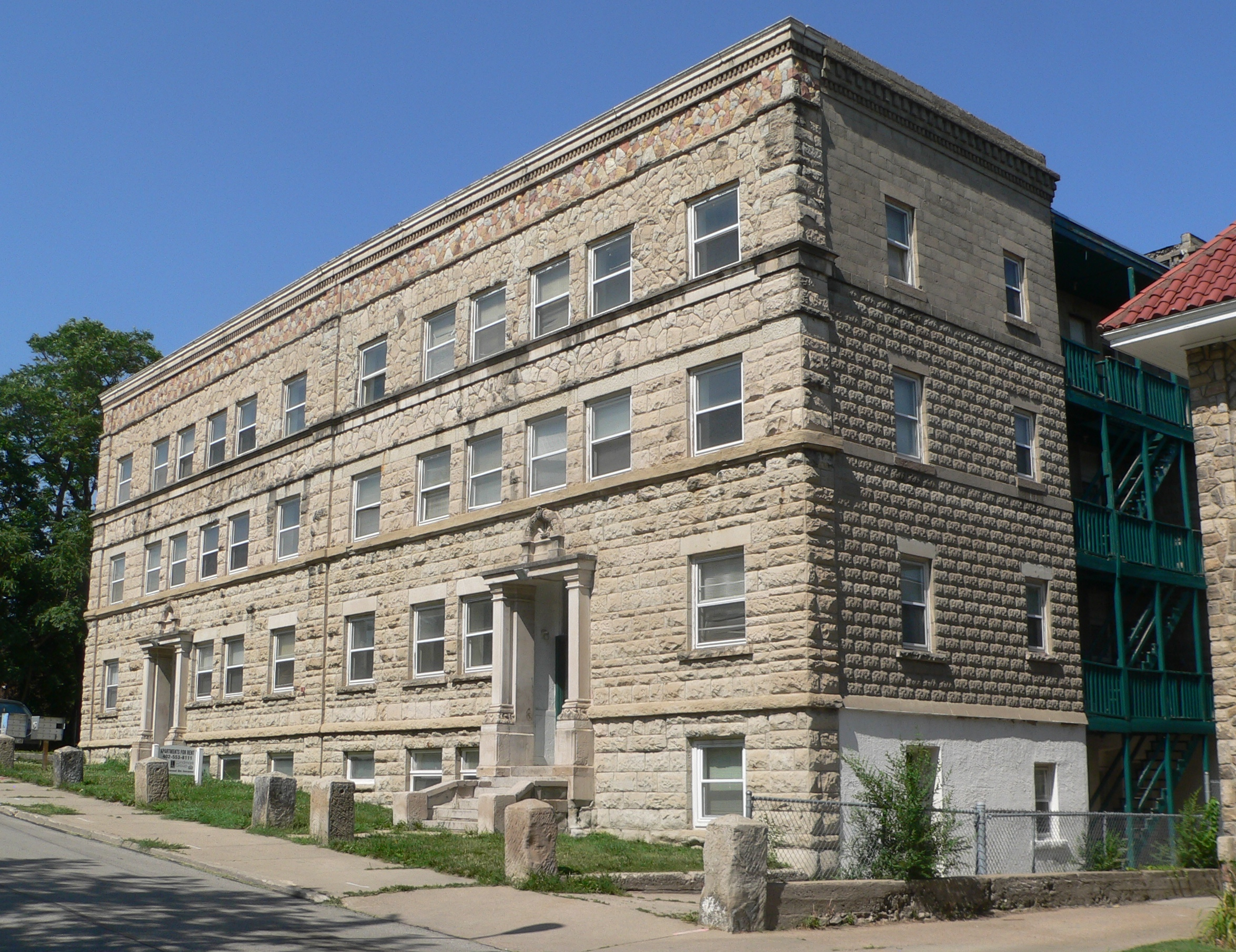
- Florentine Apartments

- Location within Nebraska Location within the United States
- Location: 832 S. 24th St., 834 S. 24th St. and 907-911 S. 25th St., Omaha, Nebraska
- Coordinates: 41°15′4.4″N 95°56′53″W
- Area: less than one acre
- Built: 1909
- Architect: Chiodo, Vincenzo P.
- Architectural style: Late 19th And 20th Century Revivals, Italian Renaissance
- NRHP reference No.: 85001073
- Added to NRHP: May 16, 1985

The Leone, Florentine, and Carpathia Apartment Buildings are located at 832 and 834 South 24 Street and 907-911 South 25 Street in Omaha, Nebraska, USA. Built in 1909, the buildings were listed on the National Register of Historic Places in 1985.
