= Berkeley Apartments (Omaha, Nebraska) =

Historic three-story apartment building in Omaha, Nebraska

- The Berkeley Apartments
- U.S. National Register of Historic Places
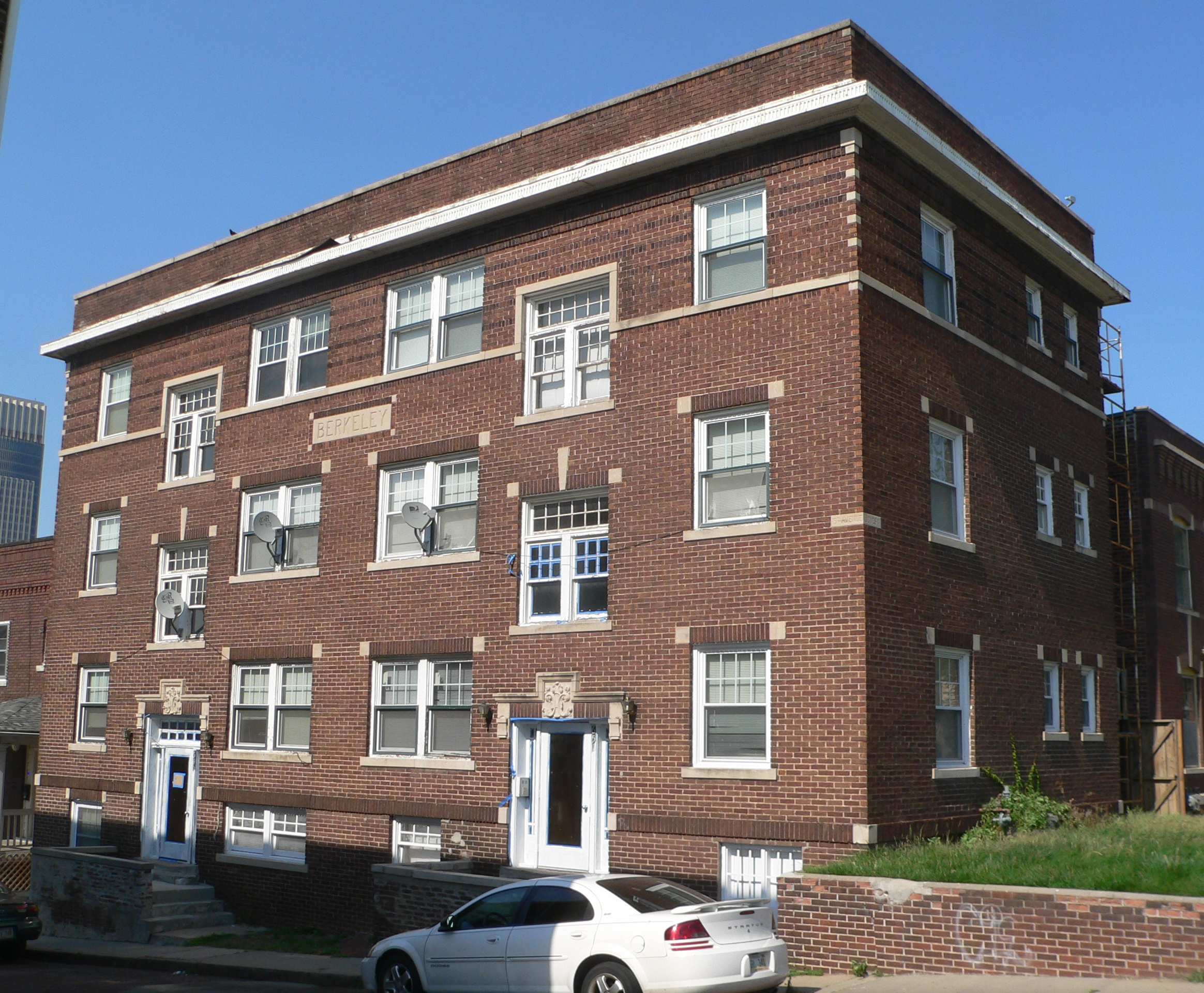
- The building in 2012

- Location within Nebraska Location within the United States
- Location: 649 South 19th Avenue, Omaha, Nebraska
- Coordinates: 41°15′11″N 95°56′28″W
- Area: less than one acre
- Built: 1915
- Built by: O.F. Nelson
- Architect: H.D. Frankfurt
- Architectural style: Late 19th And Early 20th Century American Movements
- NRHP reference No.: 96000767
- Added to NRHP: July 19, 1996

The Berkeley Apartments is a historic three-story apartment building in Omaha, Nebraska. It was built by O.F. Nelson in 1915, and designed in an eclectic style with Prairie School features by H. D. Frankfurt. By the 1990s, it was "one of the finest surviving examples" of buildings designed by Frankfurt. It has been listed on the National Register of Historic Places since July 19, 1996.
