= Georgia Row House =

Historic house in Nebraska, United States

- U.S. National Register of Historic Places
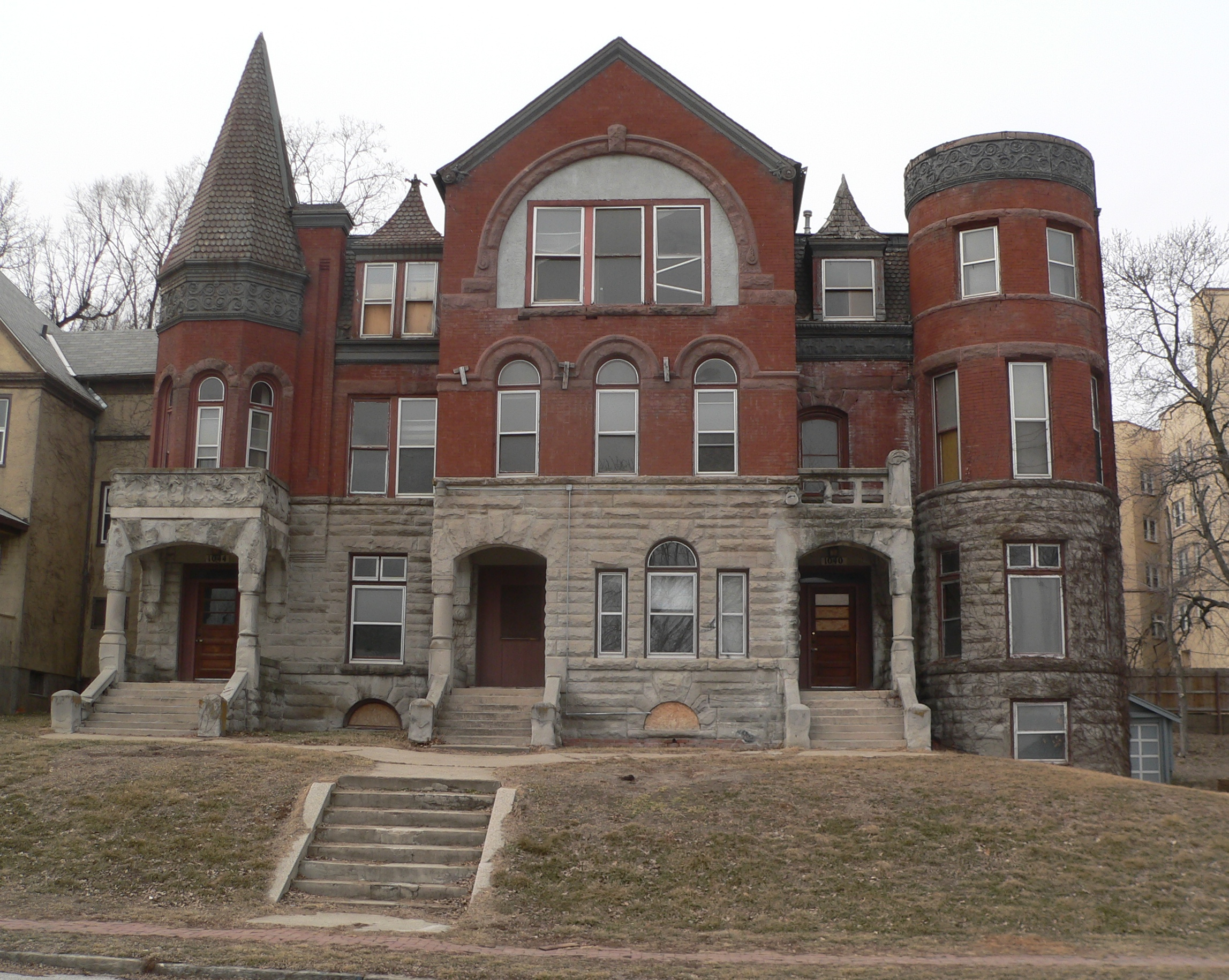
- Georgia Row House in February 2013

- Location within Nebraska
- Location: Omaha, Nebraska
- Coordinates: 41°14′58.3″N 95°57′17.6″W
- Built: 1890
- Architect: Findley & Shields
- Architectural style: Queen Anne
- NRHP reference No.: 82000603
- Added to NRHP: November 12, 1982

The Georgia Row House (also known as the Georgia Boarding House) is a historic house located in Omaha, Nebraska, United States. The Queen Anne style house was designed by the architects Findley & Shields, and was constructed of brick, limestone, sandstone and stucco. The Georgia House is one of the few remaining traditional houses in the city of Omaha. It lands on 9 acres with three buildings on site.

== History ==
The Georgia Row House is a three-story building in Douglas County erected in 1890 for J. Herbert Van Closter, who was president of the Nebraska Mortgage and Loan Company. It is now one of the few remaining traditional row houses in the city. It was named in honor of Georgia Avenue, which was the previous name of Omaha's 29th Street. The interior is furnished with simple oak fittings and eight fireplaces. It is currently owned by inCOMMON Community Development, an Omaha-based non-profit with the mission of "alleviating poverty at a root level by uniting and strengthening vulnerable neighborhoods." inCOMMON has plans to redevelop the property as affordable, family housing.

As of 2013, the house is now known as the Georgia Apartments and is located at 1040–1044 South 29th Street.
