= Landmarks Heritage Preservation Commission =

The City of Omaha Landmarks Heritage Preservation Commission, established in 1977, is the Omaha city government's a nine-member board responsible for recommending official Omaha Landmarks to the Omaha City Council. The Landmarks Heritage Preservation Commission is that was established by ordinance in 1977 to review and recommend to the City Council on all matters pertaining to the designation of individual buildings, sites, objects, or entire districts of local historical significance. The commission is staffed by the Landmarks Division of the Omaha Planning Department.

== History ==
The first comprehensive preservation ordinance in Nebraska was adopted by the Omaha City Council in 1977. The commission was created after the demolition of the Old Post Office, when the pro-preservation organization Landmarks, Inc. advocated its creation.

Patterned after successful legislation in Seattle, New York City and Savannah, Georgia, the "Landmarks Heritage Preservation Ordinance" created the Landmarks Heritage Preservation Commission. The first comprehensive preservation ordinance in Nebraska, its purpose focuses on designating structures and districts of local significance; regulate work done on designated buildings; and identify and implement overall goals and objectives for preservation in the city.

== Composition ==
The Commission has nine members, including an architect, a curator, a professional historian, three members active in a preservation-related field, two laypersons and an owner or operator of a business or property within a landmark heritage preservation district. Commission members are appointed by the Mayor to terms of three years, subject to confirmation by the City Council. The Commission selects its own chairman and rules of procedure. The body generally meets monthly with special meetings held by call of the chairman. The Nebraska State Historical Society funded the development of the Commission's website, and a Geographic Information System (GIS) for historic properties in 2000.

== Designations ==
As of 2007, more than 90 buildings and structures in Omaha have received Federal Historic Preservation Tax Incentives, and have been listed by the City of Omaha as Certified Historic Rehabs.

== See also ==
- Omaha Landmarks
