= St. Joseph Parish Complex =

Historic church in Nebraska, United States

- Saint Joseph Parish Complex
- U.S. National Register of Historic Places
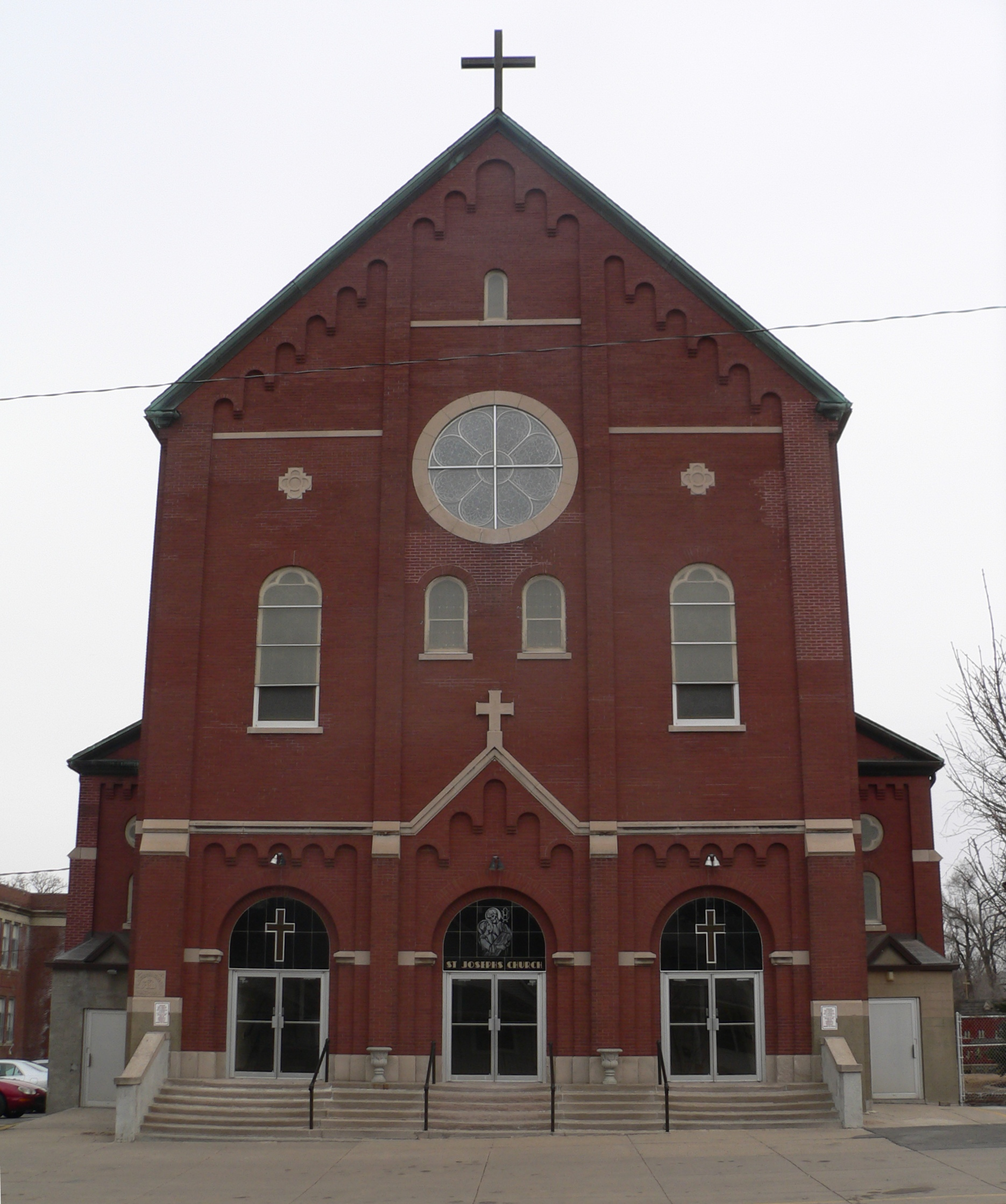
- St. Joseph Church

- Location within Nebraska Location within the United States
- Location: Omaha, Nebraska
- Coordinates: 41°14′31″N 95°56′17″W
- Built: 1886
- Architect: Brother Adrian Wewer, Brother Leonard Darscheid, et al.
- Architectural style: Tudor Revival, Other, Romanesque
- NRHP reference No.: 86001716
- Added to NRHP: July 17, 1986

The Saint Joseph Parish Complex is located at 1730 South 16th Street in South Omaha, Nebraska within the Roman Catholic Archdiocese of Omaha.

== Description ==
Established in 1886, the congregation was founded "to serve Omaha's German-speaking Catholics." St. Joseph's continues with parishioners of German heritage comprising a large percentage of the church's membership.

The church was located in an area of German Catholics that was centered on South 16th Street and Center Street, and which was exclusive of Protestant Germans, who generally settled in a concentration centered on South 11th Street and Center Street where they built a German Methodist Episcopal Church in 1886.

The complex includes a church, a friary, a convent, and two school buildings. The friary, built in 1886, was planned by the same Brother who designed the convent and school in 1901. In 1928 a second school building was designed by Omaha architect Jacob Nachtigall.

== See also ==
- Roman Catholic Archdiocese of Omaha
- List of churches in Omaha, Nebraska
