= National Register of Historic Places listings in Douglas County, Nebraska =

Location of Douglas County in Nebraska

Douglas County, Nebraska, United States, has 198 properties and districts listed on the National Register of Historic Places, including three National Historic Landmarks. Six properties were once listed on the National Register but have since been removed.

The locations of National Register properties and districts for which the latitude and longitude coordinates are included below may be seen in a map.

This National Park Service list is complete through NPS recent listings posted November 6, 2026.

== Current listings ==
	Name on the Register	Image	Date listed	Location	City or town	Description
1	10th and Pierce Car Barn	10th and Pierce Car Barn	November 12, 2015 (#15000792)	1125 S. 11th St. 41°14′54″N 95°55′48″W	Omaha	
2	Ackerhurst-Eipperhurst Dairy Barn	Ackerhurst-Eipperhurst Dairy Barn	March 28, 2002 (#02000272)	15220 Military Rd. 41°20′12″N 96°09′10″W	Bennington	
3	Allas Apartments	Allas Apartments	July 22, 2016 (#16000479)	1609 Binney St. 41°17′09″N 95°56′16″W	Omaha	A.k.a. Atlas Apartments
4	The Anderson Building	The Anderson Building	November 20, 2009 (#09000938)	701 S. 24th St. and 2243 Jones; 41°15′11″N 95°56′49″W	Omaha	Sullivanesque commercial and residential building which is a "textbook example" of its type
5	Anheuser-Busch Beer Depot	Anheuser-Busch Beer Depot	February 1, 1979 (#79001440)	1207-1215 Jones St. 41°15′11″N 95°55′57″W	Omaha	
6	Apartments at 2514 North 16th Street	Apartments at 2514 North 16th Street	August 30, 2010 (#10000607)	2514 N. 16th St. 41°16′55″N 95°56′16″W	Omaha	Apartments, Flats and Tenements in Omaha, Nebraska from 1880-1962 MPS
7	Aquila Court Building	Aquila Court Building	October 2, 1973 (#73001059)	1615 Howard St. 41°15′19″N 95°56′16″W	Omaha	Now operated as Magnolia Hotel
8	Astro Theater	Astro Theater	August 13, 1974 (#74001108)	2001 Farnam St. 41°15′26″N 95°56′33″W	Omaha	Renovated in the 1990s and renamed Rose Blumkin Performing Arts Center (The Rose)
9	Bank of Florence	Bank of Florence	October 15, 1969 (#69000130)	8502 N. 30th St. 41°20′15″N 95°57′38″W	Omaha	
10	Barker Building	Barker Building	July 2, 2008 (#08000605)	306 S. 15th St. 41°15′30″N 95°56′29″W	Omaha	
11	Beebe and Runyan Furniture Showroom and Warehouse	Beebe and Runyan Furniture Showroom and Warehouse	July 23, 1998 (#98000895)	105 S. 9th St. 41°15′33″N 95°55′39″W	Omaha	
12	Bemis Omaha Bag Company Building	Bemis Omaha Bag Company Building	January 11, 1985 (#85000066)	614-624 S. 11th St. and 1102-1118 Jones St. 41°15′13″N 95°55′52″W	Omaha	
13	Bennington State Bank	Bennington State Bank	November 8, 2006 (#06000998)	15411 S. 2nd St. 41°21′47″N 96°09′23″W	Bennington	
14	Benson Commercial Historic District	Benson Commercial Historic District	November 13, 2020 (#100005766)	Centered along Maple St. between North 59th and North 63rd Sts. 41°17′06″N 96°00′26″W	Omaha	
15	The Berkeley Apartments	The Berkeley Apartments	July 19, 1996 (#96000767)	649 S. 19th Ave. 41°15′12″N 95°56′29″W	Omaha	
16	Blackstone Hotel	Blackstone Hotel	January 11, 1985 (#85000067)	302 S. 36th St. 41°15′26″N 95°57′59″W	Omaha	
17	Bradford-Pettis House	Bradford-Pettis House	July 21, 1983 (#83001090)	400 S. 39th St. 41°15′25″N 95°58′20″W	Omaha	
18	J. L. Brandeis and Sons Store Building	J. L. Brandeis and Sons Store Building	October 20, 1982 (#82000601)	200 S. 16th St. 41°15′30″N 95°56′16″W	Omaha	
19	Brandeis-Millard House	Brandeis-Millard House	November 28, 1980 (#80002446)	500 S. 38th St. 41°15′22″N 95°58′11″W	Omaha	
20	Broadview Hotel	Broadview Hotel	December 18, 2025 (#100012410)	2060 Florence Boulevard (North 19th Street); 41°16′43″N 95°56′28″W	Omaha	
21	Broomfield Rowhouse	Broomfield Rowhouse	March 21, 2007 (#07000179)	2502-2504 Lake St. 41°16′54″N 95°56′56″W	Omaha	
22	Burlington Headquarters Building	Burlington Headquarters Building	December 4, 1974 (#74001109)	1004 Farnam St. 41°15′27″N 95°55′46″W	Omaha	
23	Burlington Train Station	Burlington Train Station	August 7, 1974 (#74001110)	925 S. 10th St. 41°14′59″N 95°55′42″W	Omaha	
24	Cabanne Archeological Site		May 5, 1972 (#72000749)	Address Restricted	Omaha	
25	Capitol Garage	Capitol Garage	May 11, 2012 (#12000102)	202 N. 19th St. 41°15′40″N 95°56′29″W	Omaha	
26	Center School	Center School	August 23, 1985 (#85001796)	1730 S. 11th St. 41°14′30″N 95°55′50″W	Omaha	
27	Champe-Fremont 1 Archeological Site		October 21, 1975 (#75001091)	Address restricted	Omaha	Extends into Sarpy County
28	Chiodo Apartments	Chiodo Apartments	November 9, 2017 (#100001798)	2556 Marcy St. 41°15′05″N 95°57′00″W	Omaha	
29	Clifton Hill Commercial Historic District	Clifton Hill Commercial Historic District	October 25, 2022 (#100008316)	1900-2200 blks. Military Ave. 41°16′42″N 95°58′48″W	Omaha	
30	City National Bank Building and Creighton Orpheum Theater	City National Bank Building and Creighton Orpheum Theater	March 26, 1973 (#73001061)	16th and Harney Sts. 41°15′23″N 95°56′13″W	Omaha	
31	Columbian School	Columbian School	November 28, 1990 (#90001769)	3819 Jones St. 41°15′12″N 95°58′12″W	Omaha	
32	Joel N. Cornish House	Joel N. Cornish House	August 13, 1974 (#74001111)	1404 S. 10th St. 41°14′43″N 95°55′47″W	Omaha	
33	Country Club Historic District	Country Club Historic District	December 30, 2004 (#04001410)	Roughly 50th to 56th Sts. and Corby to Seward Sts. 41°16′46″N 95°59′46″W	Omaha	
34	Gen. George Crook House	Gen. George Crook House	April 16, 1969 (#69000131)	Quarters No. 1, Fort Omaha; 41°18′38″N 95°57′36″W	Omaha	
35	Danish Brotherhood in America National Headquarters Building	Danish Brotherhood in America National Headquarters Building	July 22, 2016 (#16000480)	3717 Harney St. 41°15′25″N 95°58′07″W	Omaha	
36	M. A. Disbrow and Company Buildings	M. A. Disbrow and Company Buildings	August 1, 2008 (#08000768)	1201-1221 Nicholas St. and 1206, 1218, and 1224 Izard St. 41°16′10″N 95°55′57″W	Omaha	
37	Douglas County Courthouse	Douglas County Courthouse	October 11, 1979 (#79003683)	1700 Farnam St. 41°15′25″N 95°56′20″W	Omaha	
38	Drake Court Historic District	Drake Court Historic District	November 10, 1980 (#80002447)	221-223, 2230, and 2236 Jones St. 41°15′12″N 95°56′37″W	Omaha	Boundary increase and decrease, and name change, on 2014-06-04; originally listed as Drake Court Apartments and the Dartmore Apartments Historic District
39	Druid Hall	Druid Hall	July 7, 2015 (#15000393)	2412 Ames Ave. 41°17′59″N 95°56′52″W	Omaha	
40	Drummond Motor Company	Drummond Motor Company	July 16, 2018 (#100002661)	2600 Farnam St. 41°15′28″N 95°57′01″W	Omaha	
41	Dundee-Happy Hollow Historic District	Dundee-Happy Hollow Historic District	July 22, 2005 (#05000726)	Roughly Hamilton on the north, JE George and Happy Hollow on the west, Leavenworth on the south, and 48th on the east 41°15′54″N 95°59′25″W	Omaha	
42	Eggerss-O'Flyng Building	Eggerss-O'Flyng Building	December 13, 1991 (#91001759)	801 S. 15th St. 41°15′07″N 95°56′08″W	Omaha	
43	Elkhorn Commercial Historic District	Elkhorn Commercial Historic District	October 7, 2024 (#100010478)	Four blocks in the original town plat of downtown Elkhorn centered on N. Main and N. 205th Streets; 41°16′26″N 96°14′10″W	Elkhorn	
44	Elkhorn Town Hall	Elkhorn Town Hall	March 7, 2022 (#100007505)	20515 Corby St. 41°17′01″N 96°14′10″W	Elkhorn	
45	Fairacres Historic District		July 24, 2017 (#100001353)	Roughly bounded by Fairacres Rd., Dodge, N. 62nd, California & N 68th Sts. 41°15′43″N 96°00′48″W	Omaha	
46	Farm Credit Building	Farm Credit Building	March 29, 2011 (#11000148)	206 S. 19th St. 41°15′30″N 95°56′29″W	Omaha	
47	Farnam Building	Farnam Building	March 9, 2000 (#00000171)	1607-1617 Farnam St. 41°15′27″N 95°56′16″W	Omaha	
48	Father Flanagan's Boys' Home	Father Flanagan's Boys' Home	February 4, 1985 (#85002439)	14153 Grodinsky Circle; 41°15′52″N 96°07′58″W	Boys Town	
49	Father Flanagan's House	Father Flanagan's House	September 6, 1979 (#79001439)	Off U.S. Route 6; 41°15′44″N 96°08′06″W	Boys Town	
50	Federal Office Building	Federal Office Building	March 17, 2009 (#09000131)	106 S. 15th St. 41°15′34″N 95°56′10″W	Omaha	
51	Field Club Historic District	Field Club Historic District	November 15, 2000 (#00001380)	Roughly bounded by Pacific, 32nd Ave., Center St., and 36th St. 41°14′39″N 95°57′47″W	Omaha	
52	Firestone Tire and Rubber Building	Firestone Tire and Rubber Building	July 16, 2018 (#100002663)	2570 Farnam St. 41°15′28″N 95°57′02″W	Omaha	
53	First National Bank Building	First National Bank Building	June 25, 1982 (#82003187)	300-312 16th St. and 1601-1605 Farnam St. 41°15′26″N 95°56′15″W	Omaha	
54	First National Center	First National Center	July 7, 2025 (#100010948)	1620 Dodge Street; 41°15′36″N 95°56′16″W	Omaha	
55	First Unitarian Church of Omaha	First Unitarian Church of Omaha	March 27, 1980 (#80002448)	3114 Harney St. 41°15′25″N 95°57′30″W	Omaha	
56	Flatiron Hotel	Flatiron Hotel	September 21, 1978 (#78003403)	1722 St. Mary's Ave. 41°15′19″N 95°56′22″W	Omaha	
57	Florence Commercial Historic District	Florence Commercial Historic District	October 25, 2022 (#100008315)	8500-8702 North 30th St. 41°20′17″N 95°57′39″W	Omaha	
58	Ford Hospital	Ford Hospital	March 20, 1986 (#86000444)	121-129 S. 25th St. 41°15′32″N 95°56′52″W	Omaha	
59	Fort Omaha Historic District	Fort Omaha Historic District	March 27, 1974 (#74001112)	30th St. between Fort St. and Laurel Ave. 41°18′29″N 95°57′32″W	Omaha	
60	Franklin School	Franklin School	February 5, 1998 (#98000070)	4302 S. 39th Ave. 41°12′59″N 95°58′22″W	Omaha	
61	Gallagher Building	Gallagher Building	July 1, 1994 (#94000653)	1902-1906 S. 13th St. 41°14′28″N 95°56′01″W	Omaha	
62	Garneau-Kilpatrick House	Garneau-Kilpatrick House	October 7, 1982 (#82000602)	3100 Chicago St. 41°15′45″N 95°57′31″W	Omaha	
63	Georgia Row House	Georgia Row House	November 12, 1982 (#82000603)	1040-1044 S. 29th St. 41°14′58″N 95°57′18″W	Omaha	
64	Gold Coast Historic District	Gold Coast Historic District	March 14, 1997 (#97000237)	Roughly bounded by 36th, 40th, Jones, and Cuming Sts. 41°15′39″N 95°58′08″W	Omaha	
65	J.A. Gross Commercial Building	J.A. Gross Commercial Building	July 24, 2017 (#100001354)	4801-4811 NW. Radial Hwy. 41°16′53″N 95°59′09″W	Omaha	
66	Hanscom Apartments	Hanscom Apartments	November 14, 2016 (#16000773)	1029 Park Ave. 41°14′59″N 95°57′20″W	Omaha	As of 2016, operated as "Bristol Apartments"
67	Havens-Page House	Havens-Page House	October 7, 1982 (#82000604)	101 N. 39th St. 41°15′21″N 95°57′51″W	Omaha	
68	USS HAZARD (AM-240) National Historic Landmark	USS HAZARD (AM-240) National Historic Landmark	January 1, 1979 (#79003712)	2497 Freedom Park Rd; 41°16′35″N 95°54′05″W	Omaha	
69	U.S.S. HAZARD and U.S.S. MARLIN	U.S.S. HAZARD and U.S.S. MARLIN	January 17, 1979 (#79001444)	2497 Freedom Park Rd; 41°16′35″N 95°54′05″W	Omaha	
70	Hill Hotel	Hill Hotel	April 20, 1988 (#88000377)	509 S. 16th St. 41°15′19″N 95°56′12″W	Omaha	
71	Hope Lutheran Church	Hope Lutheran Church	November 10, 2020 (#100005768)	2721 North 30th St. 41°17′02″N 95°57′23″W	Omaha	
72	Holy Family Church	Holy Family Church	July 17, 1986 (#86001715)	915 N. 18th St. 41°16′07″N 95°56′20″W	Omaha	
73	Holy Sepulchre Cemetery	Holy Sepulchre Cemetery	November 15, 2016 (#16000774)	4912 Leavenworth St. 41°15′15″N 95°59′17″W	Omaha	
74	Anton Hospe Music Warehouse	Anton Hospe Music Warehouse	July 23, 1998 (#98000896)	109-111 S. 10th St. 41°15′33″N 95°55′43″W	Omaha	Now part of the Omaha Downtown Courtyard Marriott hotel; also occupied by Advanced Surgery Center.
75	House of Mystery		July 16, 2026 (#100013244)	3316 Center Street; 41°14′30″N 95°57′45″W	Omaha	
76	Howard Street Apartment District	Howard Street Apartment District	November 22, 1996 (#96001382)	Roughly bounded by Harney St., 22nd St., Landon Ct., and 24th St. 41°15′21″N 95°56′44″W	Omaha	
77	Hupmobile Building	Hupmobile Building	November 12, 2014 (#14000909)	2523-2525 Farnam St. 41°15′27″N 95°56′57″W	Omaha	
78	Immaculate Conception Church and School	Immaculate Conception Church and School	May 6, 1998 (#98000390)	2708-2716 S. 24th St. 41°14′01″N 95°56′51″W	Omaha	Church still operating; school building has been converted to apartments.
79	Immanuel Deaconess Institute Nurses' Home and School for Nursing	Immanuel Deaconess Institute Nurses' Home and School for Nursing	July 24, 2017 (#100001355)	3483 Larimore Ave. 41°18′07″N 95°57′56″W	Omaha	
80	Jewell Building	Jewell Building	July 21, 1983 (#83001091)	2221-2225 N. 24th St. 41°16′47″N 95°56′48″W	Omaha	
81	George A. Joslyn Mansion	George A. Joslyn Mansion	August 25, 1972 (#72000747)	3902 Davenport St. 41°15′42″N 95°58′18″W	Omaha	
82	Keeline Building	Keeline Building	March 9, 2000 (#00000170)	319 S. 17th St. 41°15′23″N 95°56′16″W	Omaha	
83	George H. Kelly House	George H. Kelly House	July 21, 1983 (#83001092)	1924 Binney St. 41°17′11″N 95°56′31″W	Omaha	
84	Kennedy Building	Kennedy Building	August 23, 1985 (#85001794)	1517 Jackson St. 41°15′15″N 95°56′13″W	Omaha	
85	Mary Rogers Kimball House	Mary Rogers Kimball House	July 19, 1996 (#96000765)	2236 St. Mary's Ave. 41°15′15″N 95°56′46″W	Omaha	
86	Kirschbraun and Sons Creamery, Inc.	Kirschbraun and Sons Creamery, Inc.	July 23, 1998 (#98000894)	901 Dodge St. 41°15′34″N 95°55′41″W	Omaha	
87	Leavenworth Park Commercial Historic District	Leavenworth Park Commercial Historic District	August 1, 2023 (#100009208)	3114-3120 St Mary’s Ave. and 3105-3512 Leavenworth St. 41°15′09″N 95°57′30″W	Omaha	
88	Leone, Florentine and Carpathia Apartment Buildings	Leone, Florentine and Carpathia Apartment Buildings	May 16, 1985 (#85001073)	832 S. 24th St., 834 S. 24th St., and 907-911 S. 25th St. 41°15′04″N 95°56′53″W	Omaha	
89	Lincoln Highway	Lincoln Highway	December 1, 1987 (#87002098)	County Road 120 between 180th and 191st Sts. 41°17′00″N 96°11′45″W	Elkhorn	
90	Lincoln Highway-Omaha to Elkhorn	Lincoln Highway-Omaha to Elkhorn	March 13, 2003 (#03000104)	Segment of approximately 3 miles (4.8 km) along N. 174 St. 41°16′18″N 96°12′07″W	Elkhorn	
91	Little Bohemia	Little Bohemia	July 1, 2020 (#100005336)	Roughly South 13th St. from Hickory St. to 1 block north of William St. 41°14′41″N 95°56′00″W	Omaha	4 buildings demolished in 2023. 1430 S 13th St, 1430 1/2 S 13th St, 1432 S 13th St, 1432 1/2 S 13th St.
92	Livestock Exchange Building	Livestock Exchange Building	July 7, 1999 (#99000751)	2900 O Plaza; 41°12′36″N 95°57′06″W	Omaha	
93	The Logan	The Logan	July 22, 2005 (#05000721)	1804 Dodge; 41°15′36″N 95°56′25″W	Omaha	
94	Malcolm X House Site	Malcolm X House Site	March 1, 1984 (#84002463)	3448 Pinkney St. 41°17′26″N 95°57′49″W	Omaha	
95	The Margaret	The Margaret	May 15, 2007 (#07000427)	2103 N. 16th St. 41°16′41″N 95°56′13″W	Omaha	
96	Mason School	Mason School	March 13, 1986 (#86000339)	1012 S. 24th St. 41°15′01″N 95°56′52″W	Omaha	
97	Charles D. McLaughlin House	Charles D. McLaughlin House	November 8, 1982 (#82000605)	507 S. 38th St. 41°15′20″N 95°58′07″W	Omaha	
98	The Melrose	The Melrose	November 29, 1989 (#89002044)	602 N. 33rd St. 41°15′54″N 95°57′43″W	Omaha	
99	Memmen Apartments	Memmen Apartments	September 22, 2014 (#14000701)	2214, 2216, 2218, and 2220 Florence Boulevard; 41°16′47″N 95°56′28″W	Omaha	
100	Dr. Samuel D. Mercer House	Dr. Samuel D. Mercer House	June 17, 1976 (#76001130)	3920 Cuming St. 41°16′07″N 95°58′20″W	Omaha	
101	Meyer and Raapke	Meyer and Raapke	September 4, 2013 (#13000673)	1403-1407 Harney St. 41°15′23″N 95°56′06″W	Omaha	Part of the Warehouses in Omaha MPS
102	Military Road Segment	Military Road Segment	December 10, 1993 (#93001400)	Junction of 82nd and Fort Sts. 41°18′31″N 96°02′34″W	Omaha	
103	Minne Lusa Residential Historic District	Minne Lusa Residential Historic District	April 25, 2014 (#14000178)	Roughly bounded by Redick Ave. and Vane, N. 30th, and N. 24th Sts. 41°19′15″N 95°57′07″W	Omaha	
104	Morton Meadows Historic District		May 4, 2026 (#100012963)	The first and second Morton Meadows additions, Twinridge addition, and south half of Standard Place addition, bounded on the north by Poppleton Avenue, on the east by S 42nd Street, south by Center Street, and west by S 48th St. 41°14′43″N 95°58′50″W	Omaha	
105	G.C. Moses Block	G.C. Moses Block	March 9, 2000 (#00000169)	1234-1244 S. 13th St. 41°14′48″N 95°56′01″W	Omaha	
106	Moyer Row Houses	Moyer Row Houses	March 12, 2008 (#08000171)	2612-2614 and 2616-2618 Dewey; 41°15′22″N 95°57′04″W	Omaha	
107	Nash Block	Nash Block	May 16, 1985 (#85001072)	902-912 Farnam; 41°15′28″N 95°55′40″W	Omaha	
108	National Indemnity Company Headquarters	National Indemnity Company Headquarters	May 18, 2017 (#100000765)	3024 Harney St. 41°15′25″N 95°57′27″W	Omaha	
109	Nebraska Buick Auto Company	Nebraska Buick Auto Company	June 27, 2019 (#100004138)	1901 Howard St. 41°15′20″N 95°56′29″W	Omaha	
110	Nebraska School for the Deaf	Nebraska School for the Deaf	June 10, 2019 (#100003571)	3223 N. 45th St. 41°17′14″N 95°58′50″W	Omaha	
111	Henry B. Neef House	Henry B. Neef House	September 16, 2010 (#10000758)	2884 Iowa St. 41°19′29″N 95°57′22″W	Omaha	
112	Nicholas Street Historic District	Nicholas Street Historic District	March 2, 2009 (#09000070)	Bounded by N. 11th St., Izard, N. 14th St., and a line parallel to and roughly 450 feet (140 m) north of Nicholas St. 41°16′11″N 95°55′56″W	Omaha	
113	Normandie Apartments	Normandie Apartments	December 6, 1991 (#91001758)	1102 Park Ave. 41°14′55″N 95°57′21″W	Omaha	
114	24th and Lake Historic District	24th and Lake Historic District	April 12, 2016 (#16000159)	N. 24th St. between Ohio St. and Patrick Ave., and Lake St. between 26th and 22nd Sts. 41°16′54″N 95°56′49″W	Omaha	5 buildings were demolished prior to July 13, 2025. These were 2206 Lake St, 2225 Lake St, 2526 Lake St, 2505 N 24th St, and 2606 N 26th St.
115	North Presbyterian Church	North Presbyterian Church	March 20, 1986 (#86000443)	3105 N. 24th St. 41°17′14″N 95°56′48″W	Omaha	
116	Northern Natural Gas Building	Northern Natural Gas Building	August 26, 2009 (#09000649)	2223 Dodge St. 41°15′34″N 95°56′47″W	Omaha	
117	Northwestern Bell Telephone Company Regional Headquarters	Northwestern Bell Telephone Company Regional Headquarters	July 17, 2009 (#09000526)	100 S. 19th St. 41°15′34″N 95°56′30″W	Omaha	
118	Notre Dame Academy and Convent	Notre Dame Academy and Convent	March 5, 1998 (#98000192)	3501 State St. 41°20′04″N 95°58′06″W	Omaha	
119	The Nottingham Apartments	The Nottingham Apartments	April 23, 2013 (#13000195)	3304 Burt St. 41°16′02″N 95°57′43″W	Omaha	
120	Oft-Gordon House	Oft-Gordon House	March 17, 2010 (#10000080)	11523 156th St. 41°21′52″N 96°09′29″W	Bennington	Now operated as Oft's Bed & Breakfast.
121	Old Market Historic District	Old Market Historic District	March 23, 1979 (#79001441)	Bounded by 13th, Farnam, 10th, and Jackson; 41°15′20″N 95°55′51″W	Omaha	
122	Old People's Home	Old People's Home	October 21, 1987 (#87001182)	3325 Fontenelle Boulevard; 41°17′25″N 95°58′56″W	Omaha	Now known as the Leo Vaughan Senior Manor
123	Olson's Market	Olson's Market	September 3, 2013 (#13000276)	6115 Maple St. 41°17′06″N 96°00′29″W	Omaha	
124	Omaha Auto Row Historic District	Omaha Auto Row Historic District	November 12, 2019 (#100004607)	Roughly bounded by Douglas St., Dewey St., S. 24th Ave. & S. 28th St. 41°15′26″N 95°57′03″W	Omaha	
125	Omaha Bolt, Nut and Screw Building	Omaha Bolt, Nut and Screw Building	July 10, 1992 (#92000816)	1316 Jones St. 41°15′13″N 95°56′02″W	Omaha	
126	Omaha Fire Department No. 5	Omaha Fire Department No. 5	June 24, 2024 (#100010465)	4702 South 25th Street; 41°12′44″N 95°56′55″W	Omaha	
127	Omaha Ford Motor Company Assembly Plant	Omaha Ford Motor Company Assembly Plant	December 29, 2004 (#04001412)	1514-1524 Cuming St. 41°16′05″N 95°56′11″W	Omaha	
128	Omaha High School	Omaha High School	October 11, 1979 (#79003684)	124 N. 20th St. 41°15′39″N 95°56′36″W	Omaha	Omaha Central High School
129	Omaha National Bank Building	Omaha National Bank Building	October 18, 1972 (#72000748)	17th and Farnam Sts. 41°15′28″N 95°56′16″W	Omaha	
130	Omaha Park and Boulevard System	Omaha Park and Boulevard System	April 23, 2013 (#13000196)	20 city parks, 4 golf courses, and 19 connecting boulevards, including Riverview, Hanscom, and Fontenelle Parks; 41°14′32″N 95°57′29″W	Omaha	
131	Omaha Power Plant Building	Omaha Power Plant Building	July 1, 2015 (#15000394)	505 Marcy St. 41°15′08″N 95°55′18″W	Omaha	
132	Omaha Public Library	Omaha Public Library	May 22, 1978 (#78001696)	1823 Harney St. 41°15′23″N 95°56′26″W	Omaha	
133	Omaha Quartermaster Depot Historic District	Omaha Quartermaster Depot Historic District	July 26, 1979 (#79003685)	Roughly bounded by Hickory and 22nd Sts., Woolworth Ave., and the Union Pacific railroad line 41°14′39″N 95°56′36″W	Omaha	
134	Omaha Rail and Commerce Historic District	Omaha Rail and Commerce Historic District	July 19, 1996 (#96000769)	Roughly bounded by Jackson, 15th, and 8th Sts., and the Union Pacific main line 41°15′09″N 95°55′46″W	Omaha	
135	The Omaha Star	The Omaha Star	December 27, 2007 (#07001322)	2216 N. 24th St. 41°16′47″N 95°56′49″W	Omaha	
136	On Leong Tong House	On Leong Tong House	November 9, 2017 (#100001799)	1518 Cass St. 41°15′49″N 95°56′12″W	Omaha	Society house for a Chinese tong.
137	Orchard Hill Commercial Historic District	Orchard Hill Commercial Historic District	November 12, 2020 (#100005767)	4002-4016 Hamilton St., 1324-1330, 1406-1412 North 40th St. 41°16′20″N 95°58′22″W	Omaha	
138	The Ottawa Block	The Ottawa Block	April 22, 2013 (#13000197)	2401 Farnam St. 41°15′27″N 95°56′50″W	Omaha	
139	Packer's National Bank Building	Packer's National Bank Building	May 16, 1985 (#85001071)	4939 S. 24th St. 41°12′31″N 95°56′48″W	Omaha	
140	Park Avenue Apartment District	Park Avenue Apartment District	July 2, 2008 (#08000602)	2935 Leavenworth St., 804 Park Ave., 803 S. 30th St., 2934 Leavenworth St., 720 Park Ave., and 721 S. 30th St. 41°15′10″N 95°57′22″W	Omaha	
141	Park School	Park School	November 29, 1989 (#89002043)	1320 S. 29th St. 41°14′46″N 95°57′17″W	Omaha	
142	Frank Parker Archeological Site		March 4, 2009 (#09000069)	Address Restricted	Florence	Extends into Washington County
143	Peerless Motor Company	Peerless Motor Company	November 15, 2007 (#07001188)	2562-2564 Harney St. 41°15′24″N 95°56′58″W	Omaha	
144	Carl Penke Farm	Carl Penke Farm	March 21, 2007 (#07000178)	10525 N. 168th St. 41°21′17″N 96°10′24″W	Bennington	
145	The Polish Home	The Polish Home	November 16, 2015 (#15000793)	4701 S. 25th St. 41°12′43″N 95°56′53″W	Omaha	Now El Museo Latino
146	Poppleton Block	Poppleton Block	October 7, 1982 (#82000606)	1001 Farnam St. 41°15′26″N 95°55′45″W	Omaha	
147	Porter-Thomsen House	Porter-Thomsen House	October 21, 1982 (#82000607)	3426 Lincoln Boulevard; 41°16′09″N 95°57′53″W	Omaha	
148	Prague Hotel	Prague Hotel	July 9, 1987 (#87001148)	1402 S. 13th St. 41°14′43″N 95°56′00″W	Omaha	
149	Redick Tower	Redick Tower	June 21, 1984 (#84002470)	1504 Harney St. 41°15′24″N 95°56′10″W	Omaha	
150	J. C. Robinson House	J. C. Robinson House	November 28, 1980 (#80002452)	102 E. Lincoln Ave. 41°17′33″N 96°16′51″W	Waterloo	
151	Lizzie Robinson House	Lizzie Robinson House	February 25, 1993 (#93000058)	2864 Corby St. 41°17′04″N 95°57′17″W	Omaha	
152	Rose Realty-Securities Building	Rose Realty-Securities Building	July 19, 1996 (#96000766)	305 S. 16th St. 41°15′26″N 95°56′13″W	Omaha	
153	Rosewater School	Rosewater School	May 16, 1985 (#85001070)	3764 S. 13th St. 41°13′25″N 95°56′02″W	Omaha	
154	Sacred Heart Catholic Church Complex	Sacred Heart Catholic Church Complex	March 24, 1983 (#83001093)	2218 Binney St. 41°17′11″N 95°56′45″W	Omaha	
155	Saddle Creek Underpass	Saddle Creek Underpass	June 29, 1992 (#92000741)	U.S. Route 6 (Dodge St.) over Saddle Creek Rd. 41°15′35″N 95°58′50″W	Omaha	
156	St. Cecilia's Cathedral	St. Cecilia's Cathedral	January 25, 1979 (#79001442)	701 N. 40th St. 41°15′59″N 95°58′18″W	Omaha	
157	St. John's A.M.E. Church	St. John's A.M.E. Church	May 29, 1980 (#80002449)	2402 N. 22nd St. 41°16′51″N 95°56′42″W	Omaha	
158	Saint Joseph Parish Complex	Saint Joseph Parish Complex	July 17, 1986 (#86001716)	1730 S. 16th St. 41°14′30″N 95°56′15″W	Omaha	
159	St. Martin of Tours Episcopal Church	St. Martin of Tours Episcopal Church	October 21, 1982 (#82000608)	2312 J St. 41°12′54″N 95°56′48″W	Omaha	
160	St. Matthias' Episcopal Church	St. Matthias' Episcopal Church	November 23, 1980 (#80002450)	1423 S. 10th St. 41°14′42″N 95°55′44″W	Omaha	
161	St. Philomena's Cathedral and Rectory	St. Philomena's Cathedral and Rectory	January 3, 1980 (#80002451)	1335 S. 10th St. 41°14′45″N 95°55′43″W	Omaha	Now known as St. Frances Cabrini Church; adjacent school has been renamed All Saints
162	St. Richard's Catholic School and Rectory	St. Richard's Catholic School and Rectory	March 12, 2012 (#12000103)	4318 and 4320 Fort St. 41°18′29″N 95°58′43″W	Omaha	
163	Sanford Hotel	Sanford Hotel	September 26, 1985 (#85002556)	1913 Farnam St. 41°15′26″N 95°56′30″W	Omaha	Now the Conant Apartments.
164	Saunders School	Saunders School	March 13, 1986 (#86000336)	415 N. 41st Ave. 41°15′48″N 95°58′28″W	Omaha	
165	Scott-Omaha Tent and Awning Company	Scott-Omaha Tent and Awning Company	January 10, 2017 (#16000775)	1501 Howard St. 41°15′19″N 95°56′10″W	Omaha	
166	Scottish Rite Cathedral	Scottish Rite Cathedral	August 10, 2011 (#11000529)	202 S. 20th St. 41°15′30″N 95°56′34″W	Omaha	
167	Selby Apartments	Selby Apartments	December 30, 2004 (#04001411)	830 S. 37th St., 3710 Marcy St., and 825 S. 37th Ave. 41°15′05″N 95°58′04″W	Omaha	
168	Selma Terrace	Selma Terrace	July 2, 2008 (#08000603)	630, 634 and 636 Park Ave. 41°15′11″N 95°57′21″W	Omaha	
169	M. F. Shafer and Co. Building	M. F. Shafer and Co. Building	December 5, 2002 (#02001477)	1624 Webster; 41°15′57″N 95°56′17″W	Omaha	
170	The Sherman	The Sherman	March 13, 1986 (#86000334)	2501 N. 16th St. 41°16′55″N 95°56′13″W	Omaha	
171	Simon Brothers Company	Simon Brothers Company	April 1, 1999 (#99000423)	1024 Dodge St. 41°15′36″N 95°55′48″W	Omaha	
172	South Omaha Main Street Historic District	South Omaha Main Street Historic District	February 14, 1989 (#88002828)	Roughly S. 24th St. between M and O Sts.; also 5012-5020 S. 24th St.; 4801-4927 S. 25th St.; 2415 M St.; 2406-2425 N St; 2424-2425 0 St. 41°12′35″N 95°56′49″W	Omaha	Second set of addresses represent a boundary increase approved November 6, 2023
173	Christian Specht Building	Christian Specht Building	September 19, 1977 (#77000828)	1110 Douglas St. 41°15′32″N 95°55′52″W	Omaha	
174	Stabrie Grocery	Stabrie Grocery	November 15, 2007 (#07001189)	501 N. 13th St. 41°15′50″N 95°56′01″W	Omaha	
175	Standard Oil Company Building of Nebraska	Standard Oil Company Building of Nebraska	August 24, 1979 (#79001443)	500 S. 18th St. 41°15′19″N 95°56′24″W	Omaha	
176	Steiner Rowhouse No. 1	Steiner Rowhouse No. 1	July 3, 1991 (#91000836)	638-642 S. 19th St. 41°15′12″N 95°56′27″W	Omaha	
177	Steiner Rowhouse No. 2	Steiner Rowhouse No. 2	July 3, 1991 (#91000837)	1906-1910 Jones St. 41°15′11″N 95°56′28″W	Omaha	
178	Stephenson and Williams Livery	Stephenson and Williams Livery	October 27, 2022 (#1000083147)	1114 Florence Blvd. 41°16′14″N 95°56′28″W	Omaha	
179	Gottlieb Storz House	Gottlieb Storz House	August 7, 1974 (#74001113)	3708 Farnam St. 41°15′29″N 95°58′04″W	Omaha	
180	Strehlow Terrace	Strehlow Terrace	December 23, 1986 (#86003446)	2024 and 2107 N. 16th St. 41°16′41″N 95°56′18″W	Omaha	Now operated as Ernie Chambers Court
181	Swartz Printing Company Building	Swartz Printing Company Building	July 3, 2007 (#07000658)	714 S. 15th St. 41°15′10″N 95°56′10″W	Omaha	
182	Swoboda Bakery	Swoboda Bakery	July 19, 1996 (#96000768)	1422 William St. 41°14′45″N 95°56′09″W	Omaha	
183	Terrace Court	Terrace Court	July 2, 2008 (#08000604)	836, 840, and 842 Park Ave. 41°15′04″N 95°57′21″W	Omaha	
184	H. Thiessen Pickle Company	H. Thiessen Pickle Company	December 13, 2011 (#11000887)	3101 S. 24th St. 41°13′49″N 95°56′49″W	Omaha	
185	Traver Brothers Row Houses	Traver Brothers Row Houses	May 21, 2013 (#12001074)	2601-2607 Jones St. and 651-672 S. 26th Ave. 41°15′11″N 95°57′03″W	Omaha	
186	Trinity Cathedral	Trinity Cathedral	August 7, 1974 (#74001114)	113 N. 18th St. 41°15′37″N 95°56′21″W	Omaha	
187	Turner Court Apartments	Turner Court Apartments	November 12, 2014 (#14000910)	3106 Dodge St. 41°15′36″N 95°57′29″W	Omaha	
188	3000 Farnam (formerly the Twin Towers)	3000 Farnam (formerly the Twin Towers)	March 22, 2010 (#10000081)	3000, 3002 and 3002½ Farnam St.; 3001 Douglas St. 41°15′29″N 95°57′25″W	Omaha	North tower is gone.
189	Undine Apartments	Undine Apartments	March 12, 2008 (#08000172)	2620-2626 Dewey Ave. 41°15′22″N 95°57′05″W	Omaha	
190	Union State Bank Building	Union State Bank Building	September 2, 2021 (#100006794)	1904 Farnam St. 41°15′28″N 95°56′29″W	Omaha	
191	Union Passenger Terminal	Union Passenger Terminal	November 12, 1971 (#71000484)	801 S. 10th St. 41°15′06″N 95°55′42″W	Omaha	
192	Vinton School	Vinton School	November 29, 1989 (#89002045)	2120 Deer Park Boulevard; 41°13′43″N 95°56′40″W	Omaha	
193	Vinton Street Commercial Historic District	Vinton Street Commercial Historic District	July 11, 2006 (#06000608)	Vinton St. between Elm St. and S. 17th St. 41°14′00″N 95°56′20″W	Omaha	
194	Weber Mill	Weber Mill	December 31, 1998 (#98001568)	9102 N. 30th St. 41°20′37″N 95°57′41″W	Omaha	aka Florence Mill
195	Webster Telephone Exchange Building	Webster Telephone Exchange Building	December 5, 1977 (#77000829)	2213 Lake St. 41°16′53″N 95°56′44″W	Omaha	
196	West Lawn Mausoleum	West Lawn Mausoleum	December 30, 2004 (#04001409)	5701 Center St. 41°14′11″N 95°59′57″W	Omaha	
197	Wohlner's Neighborhood Grocery	Wohlner's Neighborhood Grocery	September 16, 2010 (#10000759)	5203 Leavenworth St. 41°15′08″N 95°59′44″W	Omaha	
198	Edgar Zabriskie House	Edgar Zabriskie House	November 28, 1978 (#78001697)	3524 Hawthorne Ave. 41°16′13″N 95°57′56″W	Omaha	

== Former listings ==
Five properties were once listed but have been delisted. In addition, the historic Clarinda & Page Apartments, at 3027 Farnam Street and 305-11 Turner Boulevard in Omaha, were deemed in a report to be NRHP-eligible, but they seem not to have actually been designated as eligible by the National Register program itself (as National Park Service "weekly lists" do not seem to record this).

	Name on the Register	Image	Date listed	Date removed	Location	City or town	Description
1	Guy C. Barton House		August 14, 1973 (#73001060)	March 5, 2018	3522 Farnam St. 41°15′29″N 95°57′52″W	Omaha	Demolished in 1982
2	Jobbers' Canyon Historic District	Jobbers' Canyon Historic District	December 4, 1986 (#86003408)	March 26, 2002	Roughly bounded by Farnam, 8th, Jackson, and 10th Sts.	Omaha	Demolished in 1988.
3	Main Street Bridge	Main Street Bridge	June 29, 1992 (#92000746)	March 5, 2018	Main St. over W. Papillion Creek; 41°16′54″N 96°14′14″W	Elkhorn	Apparently demolished and replaced with concrete slab bridge in photo.
4	Monmouth Park School		December 15, 1983 (#83003988)	March 5, 2018	4508 N. 33rd St. 41°17′59″N 95°57′41″W	Omaha	Demolished in 1995.
5	John E. Reagan House	John E. Reagan House	May 5, 2014 (#14000201)	March 3, 2023	2102 Pinkney St. 41°17′27″N 95°56′38″W	Omaha	
6	South Omaha Bridge	South Omaha Bridge	June 29, 1992 (#92000742)	July 14, 2011	U.S. Route 275/Nebraska Highway 92 over the Missouri River; 41°12′47″N 95°55′57″W	Omaha	Spanned Missouri River to Council Bluffs, Iowa; Highway Bridges in Nebraska MPS; demolished in February and March 2010

== See also ==
- List of National Historic Landmarks in Nebraska
- National Register of Historic Places listings in Nebraska
- Omaha Landmarks
