= Selma Terrace =

- U.S. National Register of Historic Places
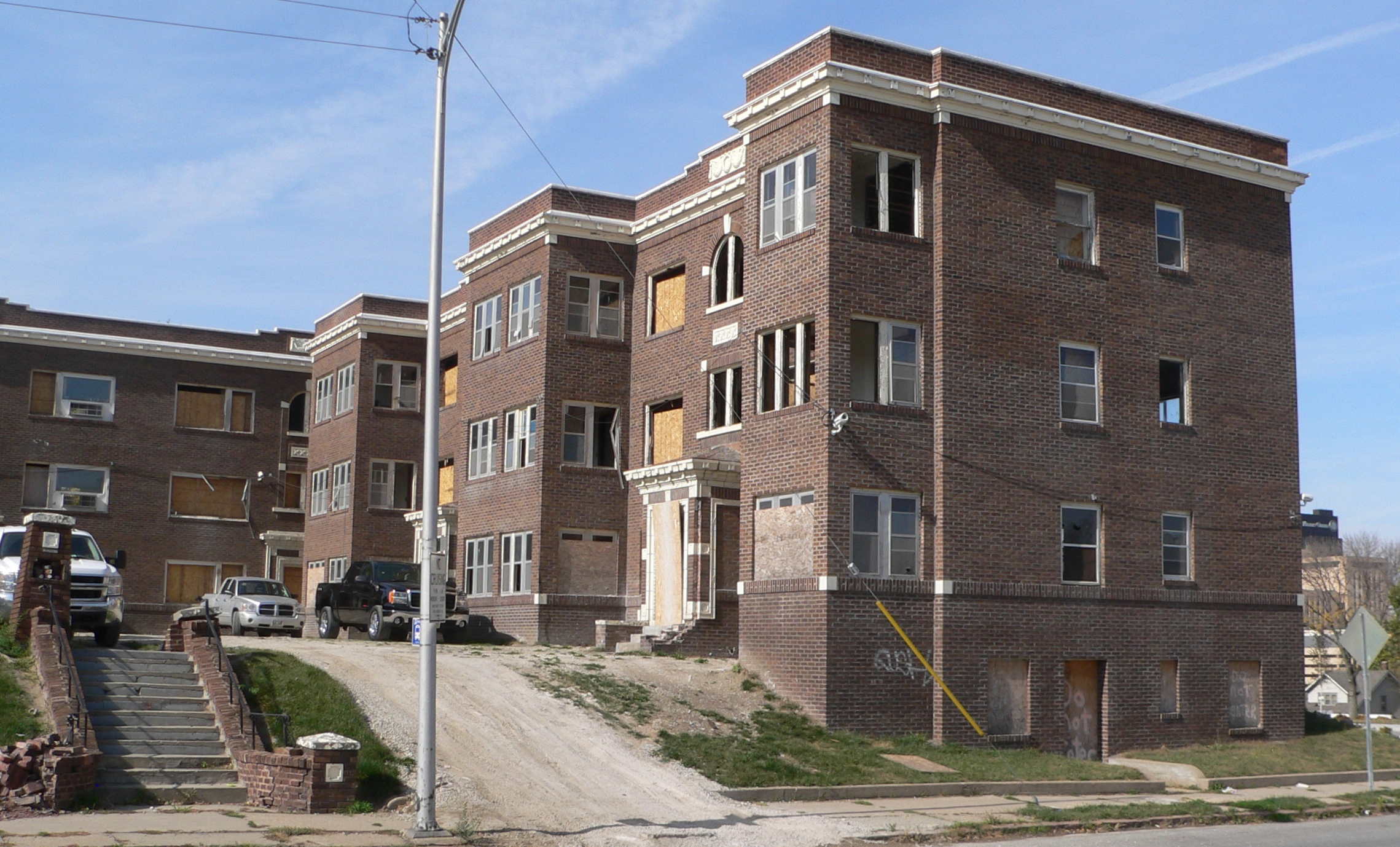
- The buildings in 2011

- Location within Nebraska Location within the United States
- Location: 630, 634 and 636 Park Avenue, Omaha, Nebraska
- Coordinates: 41°15′11″N 95°57′21″W
- Area: less than one acre
- Built: 1916
- Architect: Richard Everette
- Architectural style: Prairie School
- NRHP reference No.: 08000603
- Added to NRHP: July 2, 2008

Selma Terrace is a historic apartment complex in Omaha, Nebraska. It was built in 1916, and designed in the Prairie School style by architect Richard Everette. It has been listed on the National Register of Historic Places since July 2, 2008.
