= Redick Tower =

Building in Omaha, Nebraska

- U.S. National Register of Historic Places
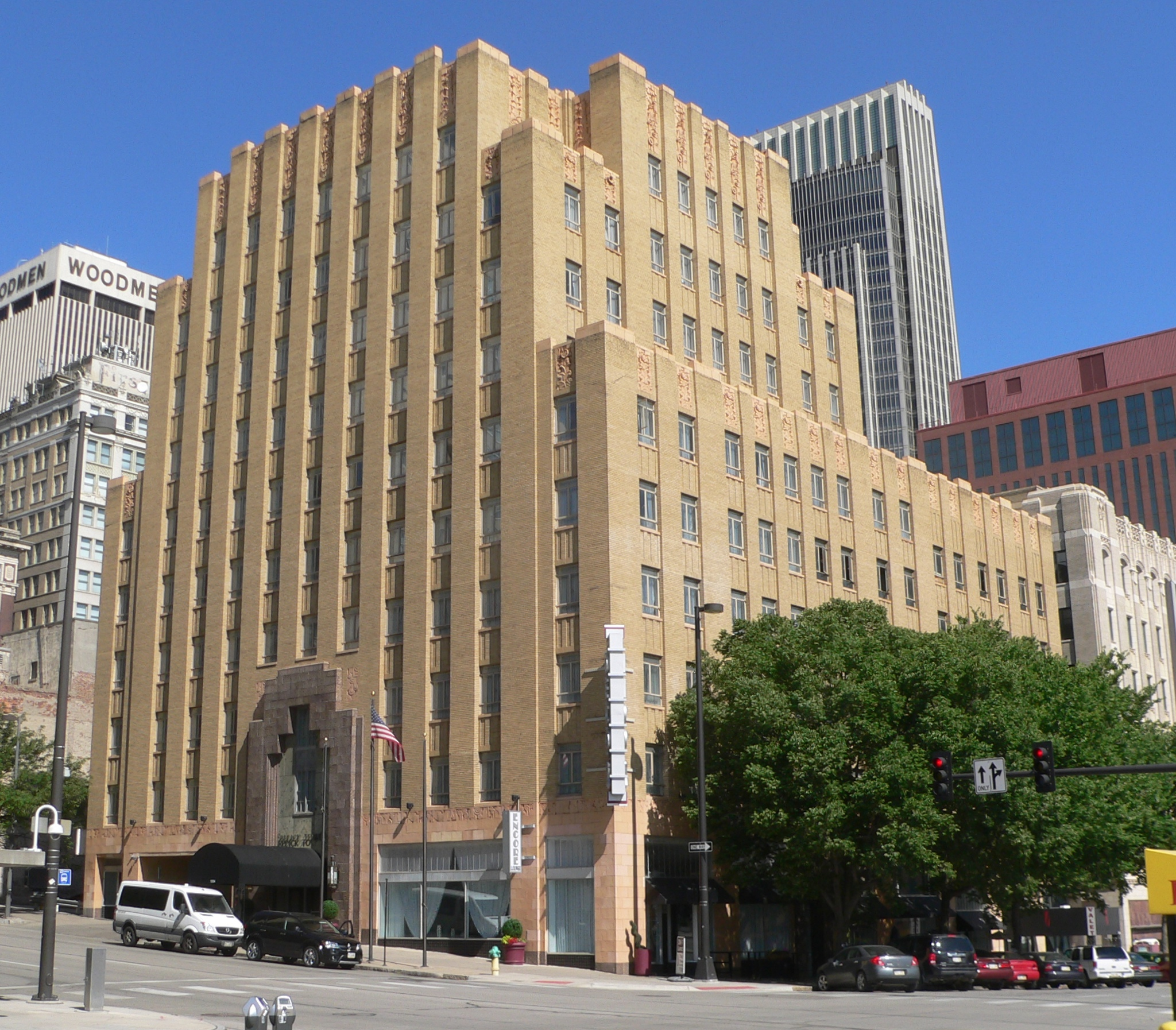
- View from the southeast
- Location: 1504 Harney Street, Omaha, Nebraska, U.S.
- Coordinates: 41°15′24.5″N 95°56′10.4″W
- Built: 1930
- Architect: Joseph G. McArthur
- Architectural style: Art Deco
- NRHP reference No.: 84002470
- Added to NRHP: June 21, 1984

The Redick Tower is an 11-story building located at 1504 Harney Street in Omaha, Nebraska, U.S. It is listed in the National Register of Historic Places. Redick Tower was built in 1930 for Garrett and Agor, Inc. and was designed by Joseph G. McArthur. Since 2011, it has been operated as a hotel known as Hotel Deco.

== History ==
The Redick Tower was built for Garrett and Agor, Inc., which managed it until the mid-1930s, when it was purchased by the Redick Tower Corporation. In 1943, it was bought by Walter Duda, an Omaha investor, who owned it until 1973, when it was acquired by the Denver-based Parking Corporation of America. It was subsequently operated as a Radisson Hotel, "considered among Omaha's best", and then as the Best Western Redick Plaza Hotel until it closed in 2009.

In 1984, the building was listed in the National Register of Historic Places. Its historic significance was attributed to its original multifunctional urban design - combining retail, office and parking space in a single building - and to its being "one of Nebraska's premier examples" of the Art Deco style. In 2010, it was purchased by the White Lotus Group, which opened it in the following year as the Hotel Deco.

== Design ==
The building was designed in the Art Deco style by an Omaha architect, Joseph G. McArthur. It was named after the Redick family, who had been among Omaha's pioneer settlers, arriving in 1856, and who had owned the land on which the building was constructed. As designed, it housed commercial storefront space on the first floor, indoor parking and garage facilities for up to 500 cars on the lower seven floors, and office space in the tower above the parking levels.

== See also ==
- History of Omaha
- National Register of Historic Places listings in Douglas County, Nebraska
