= Lincoln Highway (Omaha) =

Highway in Nebraska

Lincoln Highway
- Old Lincoln Highway highlighted in red

Route information
- Maintained by the Douglas County Public Works and the Lincoln Highway

Location
- Country: United States
- State: Nebraska
- County: Douglas

Highway system
- Auto trails; Nebraska State Highway System; Interstate; US; State; Link; Spur; State Spurs; Recreation
- Lincoln Highway (Omaha)
- U.S. National Register of Historic Places
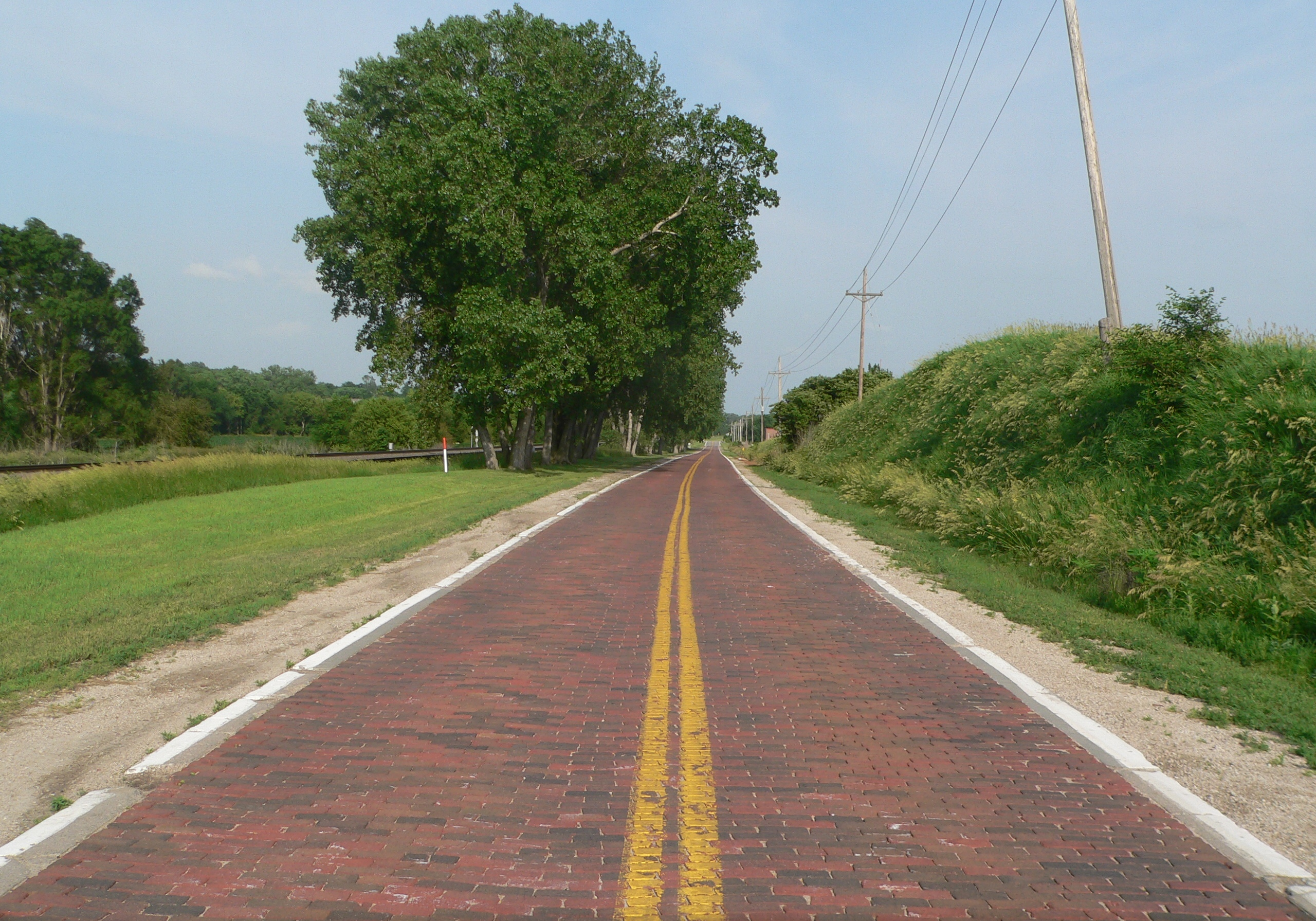
- Brick-paved section of Lincoln Highway in West Omaha near Elkhorn.
- Location: Omaha, Nebraska
- Built: 1913
- NRHP reference No.: 03000104
- Added to NRHP: 2003

The Lincoln Highway in Omaha, Nebraska, runs east–west from near North 183rd Street and West Dodge Road in Omaha, Nebraska, towards North 192nd Street outside of Elkhorn. This section of the Lincoln Highway, one of only 20 miles (32 km) that were paved with brick in Nebraska, is one of the most well-preserved in the country. The roadway was listed on the National Register of Historic Places in 1984. The Lincoln Highway was the first road across the United States, traversing coast-to-coast from Times Square in New York City to Lincoln Park in San Francisco, California.

== History ==
The original Lincoln Highway was built from Omaha to Elkhorn in 1913. The Lincoln Highway crossed the Missouri River into Omaha on the old Douglas Street Bridge and traveled west on Dodge Street, from which point it began meandering across the state following section lines. However, after the Abraham Lincoln Memorial Bridge was built at Blair in 1929, the following year Lincoln Highway was rerouted for the last time onto U.S. 30 through Blair. Soon after the rerouting was completed, local officials from Blair came to Omaha and dug up the Lincoln Highway markers that lined the road, only to re-insert them in their town. This infuriated Omahans and incited a long-standing resentment against Blair.

The elimination of the Omaha section managed to preserve the roadway from too much usage, effectively securing its usage and appreciation today.

=== Landmarks ===
According to the National Park Service, important buildings on the Lincoln Highway in Omaha included the Nash Block at 902-912 Farnam and 901-911 Douglas streets, as well as the Blackstone Hotel at Farnam Street and 36th Street. Additionally, the Rose Blumkin Performance Arts Center at 20th and Farnam Street and the Farnam Street Automobile Row, from 30th to 40th Streets were both important landmarks.

There were several other attractions on the Lincoln Highway in Omaha. They included Jobber's Canyon, a warehousing district in the downtown area that once outfitted the Old West, and Peony Park, an amusement park that was home to Lawrence Welk's orchestra in the 1930s. Other important landmarks along the highway included the Guy Barton Mansion, built in 1892 and demolished in 1982; the Hupmobile dealership at 25th and Farnam, which is the last preserved Hupmobile dealership in the United States, and; John Sutter's Mill, built in 1847 and the intersection of Saddle Creek Road and Dodge Street, immediately east of the Saddle Creek Underpass, was a landmark during the entire life of the Highway, and predated the incorporation of the neighboring towns of Dundee and Benson.

=== Preservation ===
In 1975 the Douglas County Board of Commissioners passed a resolution to maintain and preserve the roadway. In the 1980s preservationists pushed for the highway to be restored after plans were revealed that covered the road with asphalt. The section was eventually restored with original bricks that were laid in 1920. To protect the brickwork, vehicles weighing 6 tons or more are now banned from the highway.

== Development ==
The highway is currently marked by an interpretive pull-off maintained by the Omaha Public Power District, and there is a reconstructed pony truss bridge over the West Papillion Creek. There are seven historical markers lining the roadway, including a monument was erected by the Elkhorn Lincoln Highway Diamond Jubilee Committee in 1987. It includes an historic plaque and two replica 1928 Lincoln Highway markers.

The city of Omaha proposed an approximately $633,000 plan to enhance the roadway with a 0.75-mile (1.21 km) paved trail to the south of the highway and informational kiosks. This would be the farthest west trail in Omaha, although it would not connect with any other trails in the city. The Omaha government has already acquired the land needed for the trail.

== Directions ==
According to the Lincoln Highway Association, the Lincoln Highway in Omaha can still be followed through the city. The route begins by exiting I-480 at Dodge Street and following it westward, past when it becomes West Dodge Road. At the 180th Street exit, turn north onto 180th Street to its terminus at the Old Lincoln Highway. Take this stretch of the paved highway north, driving along the bricks of the highway. At the underpass with North 204th Street, take East Park Road to Main Street, then turn west onto Elkhorn Drive. At the intersection with West Maple Road, turn west and in 2.2 miles, merge onto US-275 and pass out of Douglas County. The following section of the highway was listed on the National Register of Historic Places in 2003.

== See also ==
- History of Omaha, Nebraska
