= Reinholdt F. Hennig =

American architect

Reinholdt F. Hennig (1902–1961) was an American architect based in Omaha, Nebraska. He designed Safeway Inc. stores in Iowa and Nebraska, as well as many buildings in Omaha, Nebraska, including the Selby Apartments which were listed on the National Register of Historic Places (NRHP) in part for their architecture and their association with Hennig.

He was born in South Dakota but grew up in Nebraska. He received no formal architecture degree, but entered private practice in Omaha in 1924. He became one of Omaha's most prolific architects. In 1945 he became design and construction manager for Safeway grocery stores in Nebraska and Iowa.

Hennig was greatly influenced by Frank Lloyd Wright's Usonian designs.

Hennig designed 13 homes in Omaha, three of which can be called "French fairytale cottages", following upon a request by a World War II veteran to visit and copy a house he had encountered in France.

Works by Hennig include:

- Tudor Arms (1929), 131 S. 39th St., Omaha, NRHP-listed as a contributing building in the Gold Coast Historic District
- The Arlington Manor (1929), 4905 Davenport, Omaha
- Wiltshire Apartments (1929), 4914 Capital Ave., Omaha
- Selby Apartments (1942), Omaha, NRHP-listed

He died of a heart attack. His remains are buried in Forest Lawn Memorial Park, in Omaha.
