= Undine Apartments =

- U.S. National Register of Historic Places
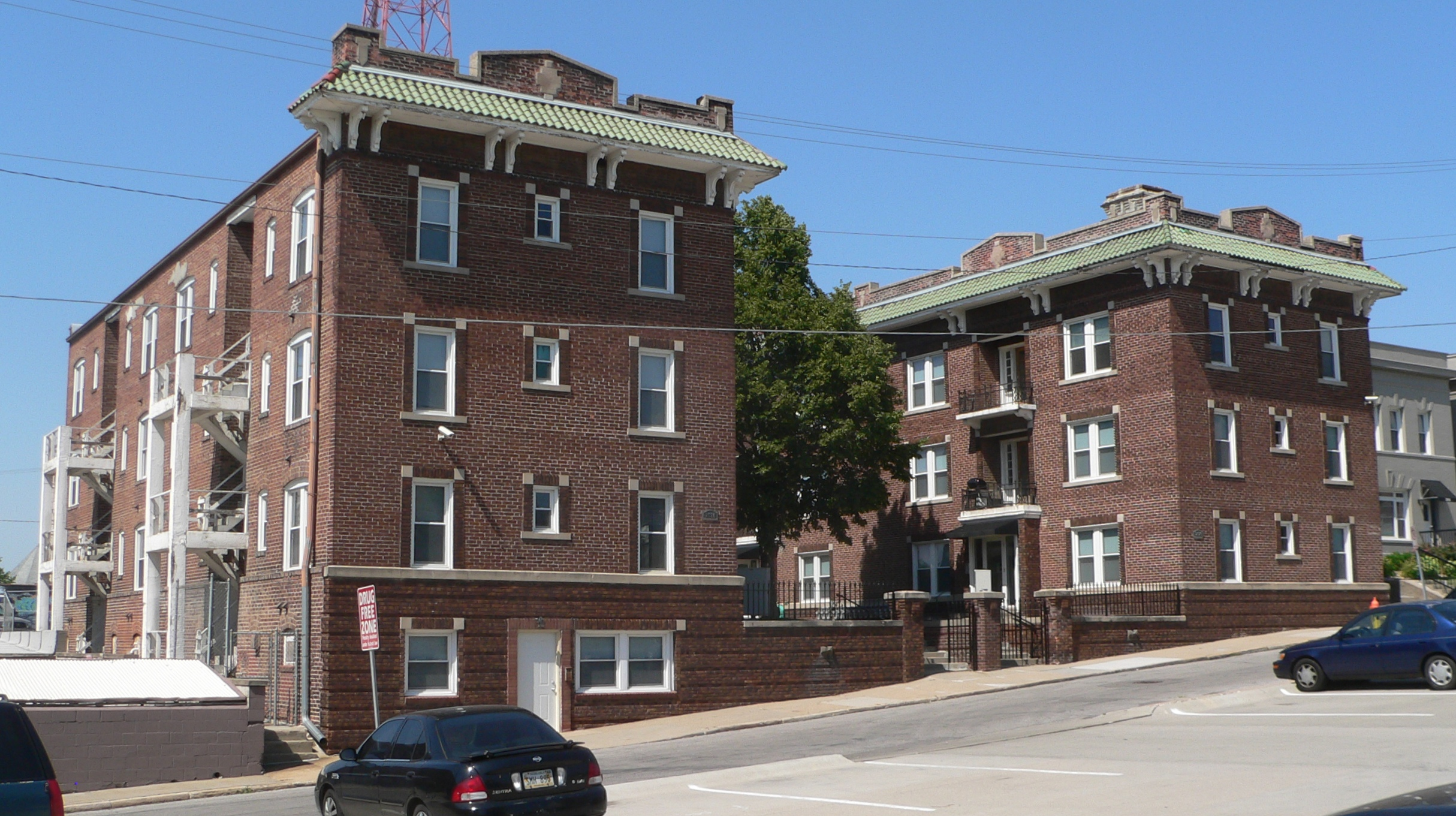
- The complex in 2012

- Location within Nebraska Location within the United States
- Location: 2620-2626 Dewey Avenue, Omaha, Nebraska
- Coordinates: 41°15′21″N 95°57′03″W
- Area: less than one acre
- Built: 1918
- Built by: Traver Brothers
- NRHP reference No.: 08000172
- Added to NRHP: March 12, 2008

The Undine Apartments is a historic apartment complex in Omaha, Nebraska. It was built in 1918 by the Traver Brothers Company, a real estate development company founded by Charles Traver. Its construction was made possible in this location thanks to the advent of the streetcar. Undine Apartments has been listed on the National Register of Historic Places since March 12, 2008.
