= John Janecek House =

Historic house in Nebraska, United States

- U.S. National Register of Historic Places
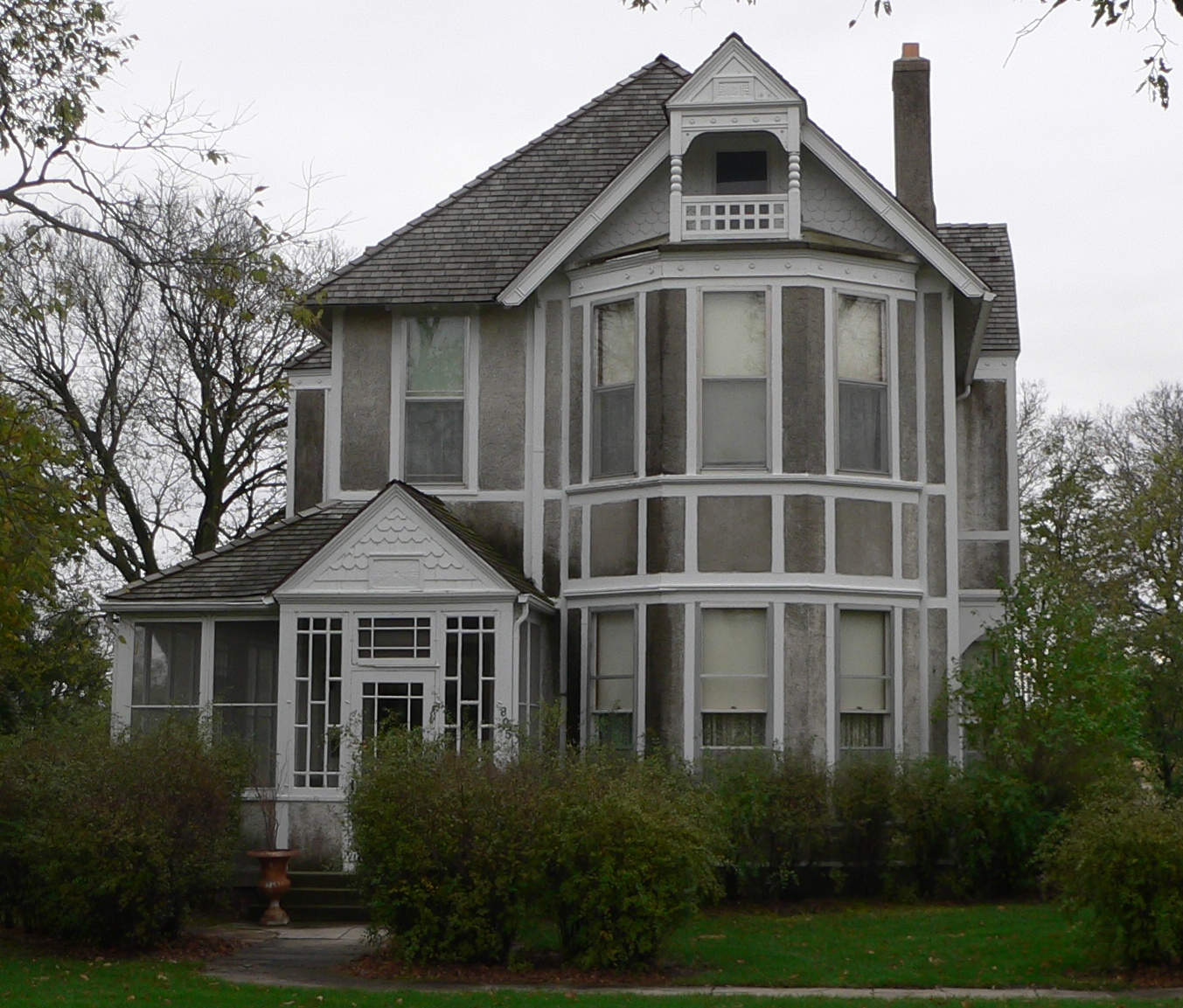
- Janecek house, seen from the north (8th Street)

- Location within Nebraska Location within the United States
- Location: 805 E. 8th St, Schuyler, Nebraska
- Coordinates: 41°26′38″N 97°3′4″W
- Built: 1885–1886
- Architect: Henry Voss
- Architectural style: Queen Anne style, vernacular
- NRHP reference No.: 82003185
- Added to NRHP: July 15, 1982

The John Janecek House, also known as the Jerry Janáček House, is an historic home located in Schuyler, Nebraska that was built in 1885–1886. It was listed on the National Register of Historic Places (NRHP) on July 15, 1982. The house was owned by John Janecek, a Czech American who immigrated to Nebraska from Bohemia in 1870. He was the owner and the proprietor of the Janecek Opera House (razed in 1963) in Schuyler.

It was designed by Omaha architect Henry Voss. The NRHP listing included an entire city block, 1.6 acres (0.65 ha) in area.
