= Moyer Row Houses =

- U.S. National Register of Historic Places
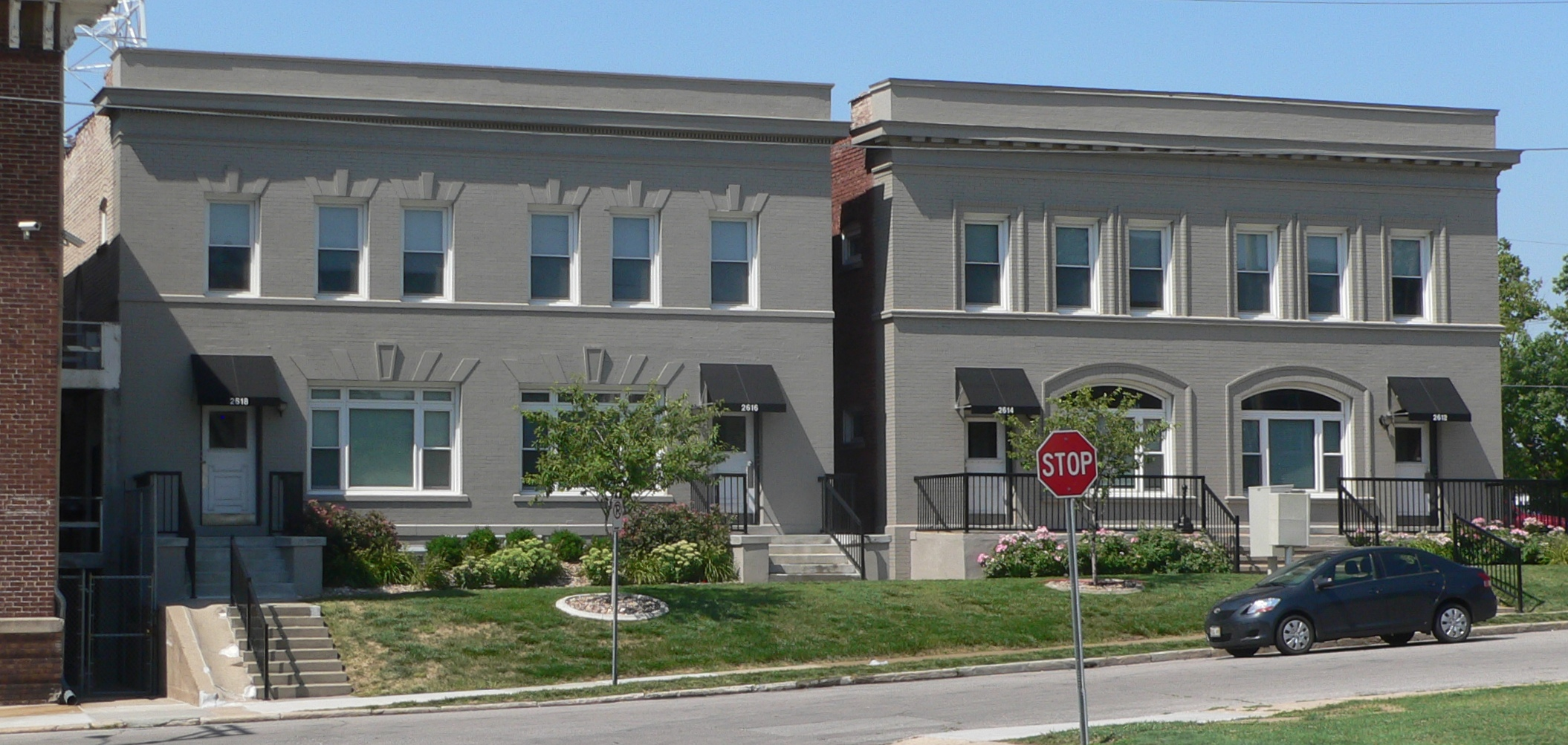
- The row houses in 2012

- Location within Nebraska Location within the United States
- Location: 2612-2614 7 2616-2618 Dewey, Omaha, Nebraska
- Coordinates: 41°15′21″N 95°57′02″W
- Area: less than one acre
- Built: 1904
- Architectural style: Renaissance
- NRHP reference No.: 08000171
- Added to NRHP: March 12, 2008

The Moyer Row Houses are two historic two-story row houses in Omaha, Nebraska. They were built in 1904, and designed in the Renaissance Revival architectural style. They have been listed on the National Register of Historic Places since March 12, 2008.
