= The Logan =

Building in Omaha, Nebraska

- U.S. National Register of Historic Places
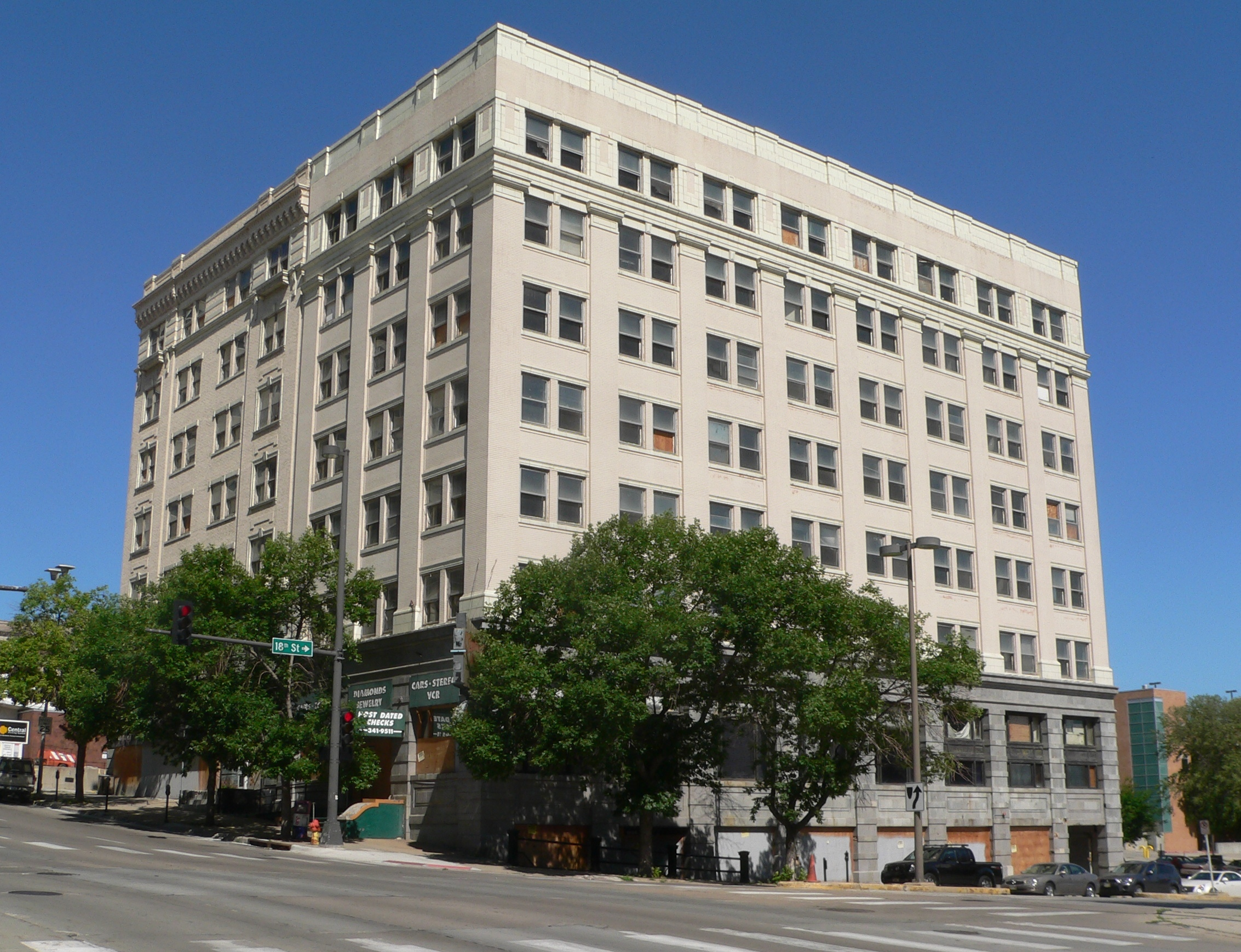
- The building in 2013

- Location within Nebraska Location within the United States
- Location: 1804 Dodge, Omaha, Nebraska
- Coordinates: 41°15′35″N 95°56′23″W
- Area: less than one acre
- Built: 1918
- Architect: James T. Allan
- Architectural style: Early Commercial
- NRHP reference No.: 05000721
- Added to NRHP: July 22, 2005

The Logan, also known as El Beudor or the Sherwyn Hotel, is a historic building in Omaha, Nebraska, US designed by architect James T. Allan and built in 1918. It has been listed on the National Register of Historic Places since July 22, 2005.
