= Henry Voss =

German-born American architect

Henry Voss (1843 – ?) was a German-born American architect who was born in Germany and began his architectural practice in that country. He immigrated to the United States in 1871 and settled in Omaha, Nebraska in 1873. He maintained a successful architectural practice in Omaha for more than 30 years.

== Early years ==
Voss was born in Schleswig-Holstein, Denmark, in 1843. He studied architecture in Switzerland and worked as an architect in Germany for several years. During this time, he was involved in the construction of a railroad in Russia. He immigrated to the United States in 1871 and was employed as a draftsman in New York City for several months. He subsequently worked as an architect in Chicago and a draftsman at Rock Island, Illinois.

== Architectural career in Nebraska ==
Voss moved to Omaha, Nebraska, in 1873 and established a successful architectural practice there. His works in Nebraska include a public school in Blair, Nebraska (1880), a county jail in Kearney, Nebraska (1875), a number of brewery buildings including the Anheuser-Busch Beer Depot in Omaha (1887), the John Janecek House in Schuyler, Nebraska (1885–1886), the Poppleton Block in Omaha, and the Nebraska State Building at the 1893 World's Columbian Exposition in Chicago. He was one of the founders of Omaha's German American Society in 1883.

== List of works ==
A number of his works are listed on the U.S. National Register of Historic Places. His works include:

- Anheuser-Busch Beer Depot, (1887), 1207-1215 Jones St. Omaha, Nebraska (Voss, Henry), NRHP-listed
- John Janecek House (1885–86), 805 E. 8th St. Schuyler, Nebraska (Voss, Henry), NRHP-listed
- Omaha Bolt, Nut and Screw Building, 1316 Jones St. Omaha, Nebraska (Voss, Henry), NRHP-listed
- Poppleton Block, 1001 Farnam St. Omaha, Nebraska (Voss, Henry), NRHP-listed
- Nebraska State Building at the 1893 World's Columbian Exposition, Chicago, Illinois
