= Terrace Court =

- U.S. National Register of Historic Places
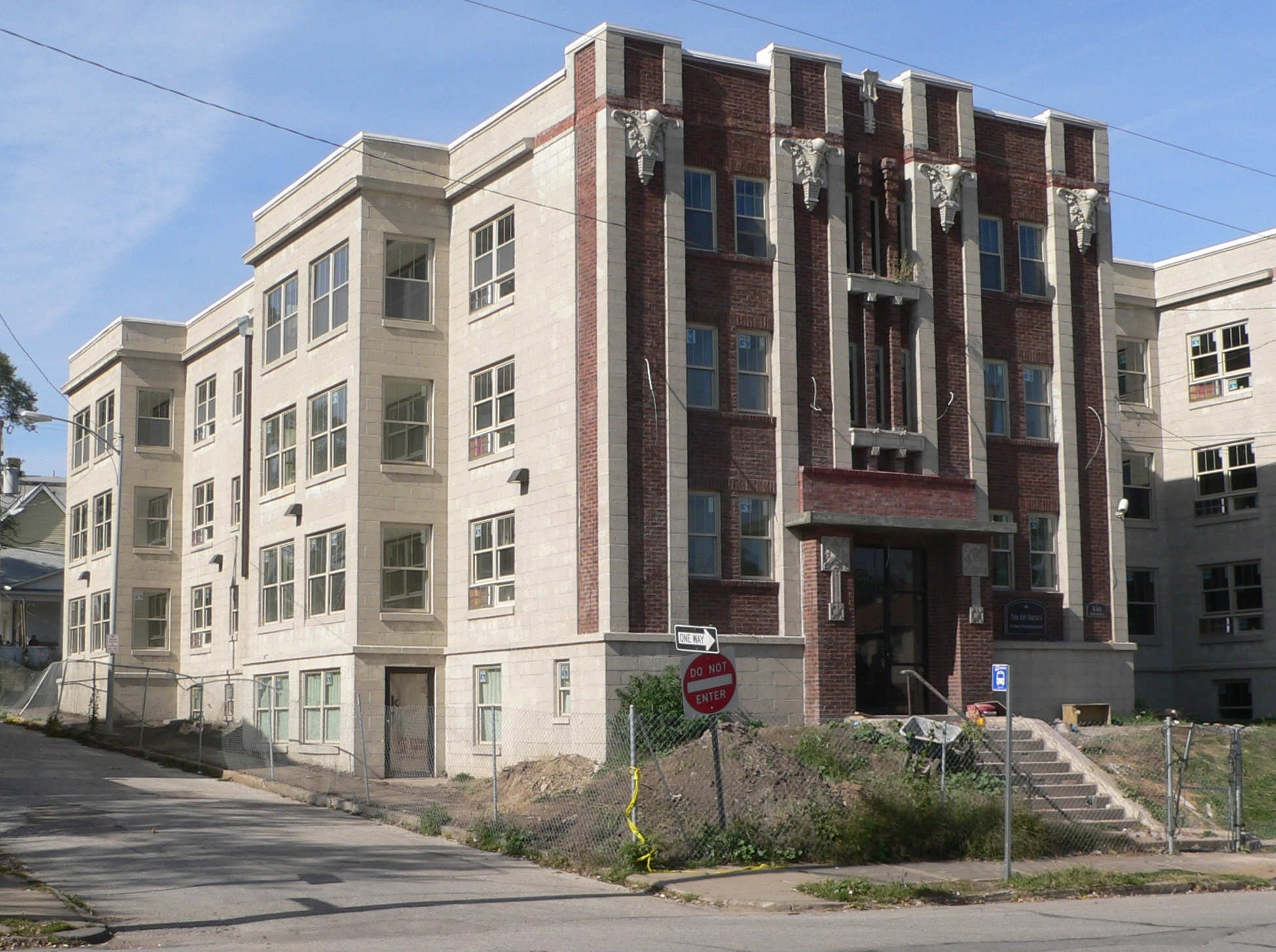
- The apartment building in 2011

- Location within Nebraska Location within the United States
- Location: 836, 840 and 842 Park Ave, Omaha, Nebraska
- Coordinates: 41°15′03″N 95°57′21″W
- Area: less than one acre
- Built: 1920
- Built by: Drake Realty & Construction Co.
- Architect: B. Hene
- Architectural style: Late 19th And Early 20th Century American Movements, Sullivanesque
- NRHP reference No.: 08000604
- Added to NRHP: July 2, 2008

Terrace Court is a historic apartment complex of three three-story buildings in Omaha, Nebraska. It was built in 1920 by the Drake Realty & Construction Co., and designed by architect B. Hene in Sullivanesque style. It has been listed on the National Register of Historic Places since July 2, 2008.
