= 10th and Pierce Car Barn =

- 10th & Pierce Car Barn
- U.S. National Register of Historic Places
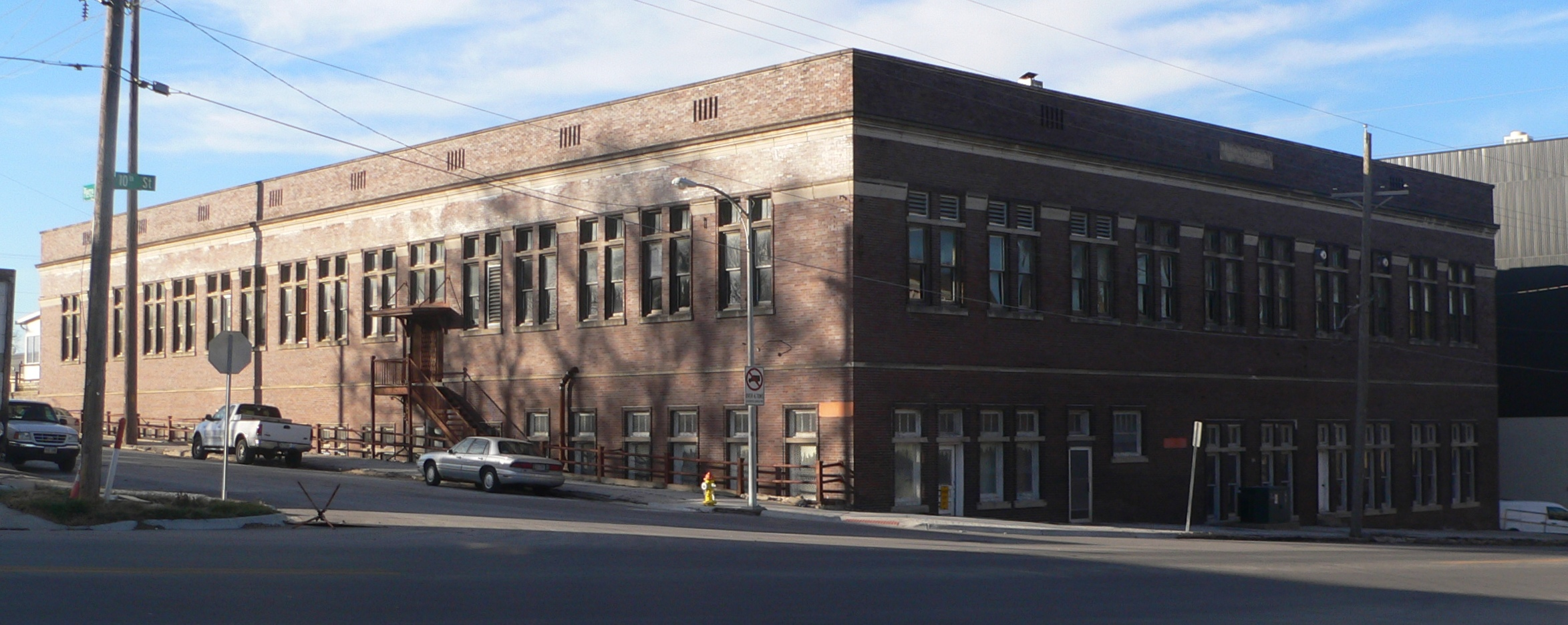
- The Carbarn in 2015

- Location within Nebraska Location within the United States
- Location: 1125 S. 11th St., Omaha, Nebraska
- Coordinates: 41.248406°N 95.929860°W
- Area: less than one acre
- Built: August 1910
- Built by: Frank Burness
- Architect: R.H. Findley
- Architectural style: Commercial style
- NRHP reference No.: 15000792
- Added to NRHP: November 12, 2015

The 10th and Pierce Car Barn is a historic car barn located at 1125 S. 11th Street in Omaha, Nebraska, United States. The building was used to house streetcars for the Omaha and Council Bluffs Street Railway Company (O&CB).

== History ==
The 10th and Pierce Car Barn was initially conceived in 1909 in order to accommodate new streetcars for the O&CB. The new streetcars were larger and heavier than previous models and were designed so that passengers would pay as they entered. Work to clear the site began in 1909 and construction of the building began in August. While originally the O&CB planned to construct a one-story facility, the slope of the site allowed for a two-story building, whereby streetcars enter the building at either level to be stored. Both levels accommodated 12 tracks each. Upon the opening of the carbarn, the Harney Street carbarn was decommissioned. The 10th and Pierce carbarn remained in service until 1955, when streetcar service in Omaha was replaced by buses.

The carbarn is the only remaining O&CB structure in Omaha. In the 2010s, an 1889 carbarn and powerhouse at the southwest corner of 19th and Nicholas, as well as a 1905 general repair shop at the northwest corner of 26th and Lake were both demolished.

The building was added to the National Register of Historic Places on November 12, 2015.
