= Automobile Row (Omaha, Nebraska) =

Automobile Row was a commercial district in Midtown Omaha, Nebraska. Early reports place the location of the strip as extending Eighteenth to Twenty-first Street along Farnam, while contemporary accounts place it from 20th to roughly 26th Street. The row featured dealers, garages, and parts stores.

== History ==
Auto rows developed in numerous US cities shortly after 1900 as car companies sought to create districts where the sale and repair of cars could become an easy urban shopping experience. Described as a "country tributary," Omaha's Farnam Street was the location of Automobile Row from the outset of car sales in Omaha. It was noted as "one of the best lots to choose from ever assembled between Chicago and San Francisco." With "five exclusive dealerships" in 1906, the strip was the prime location for car sales in Omaha.

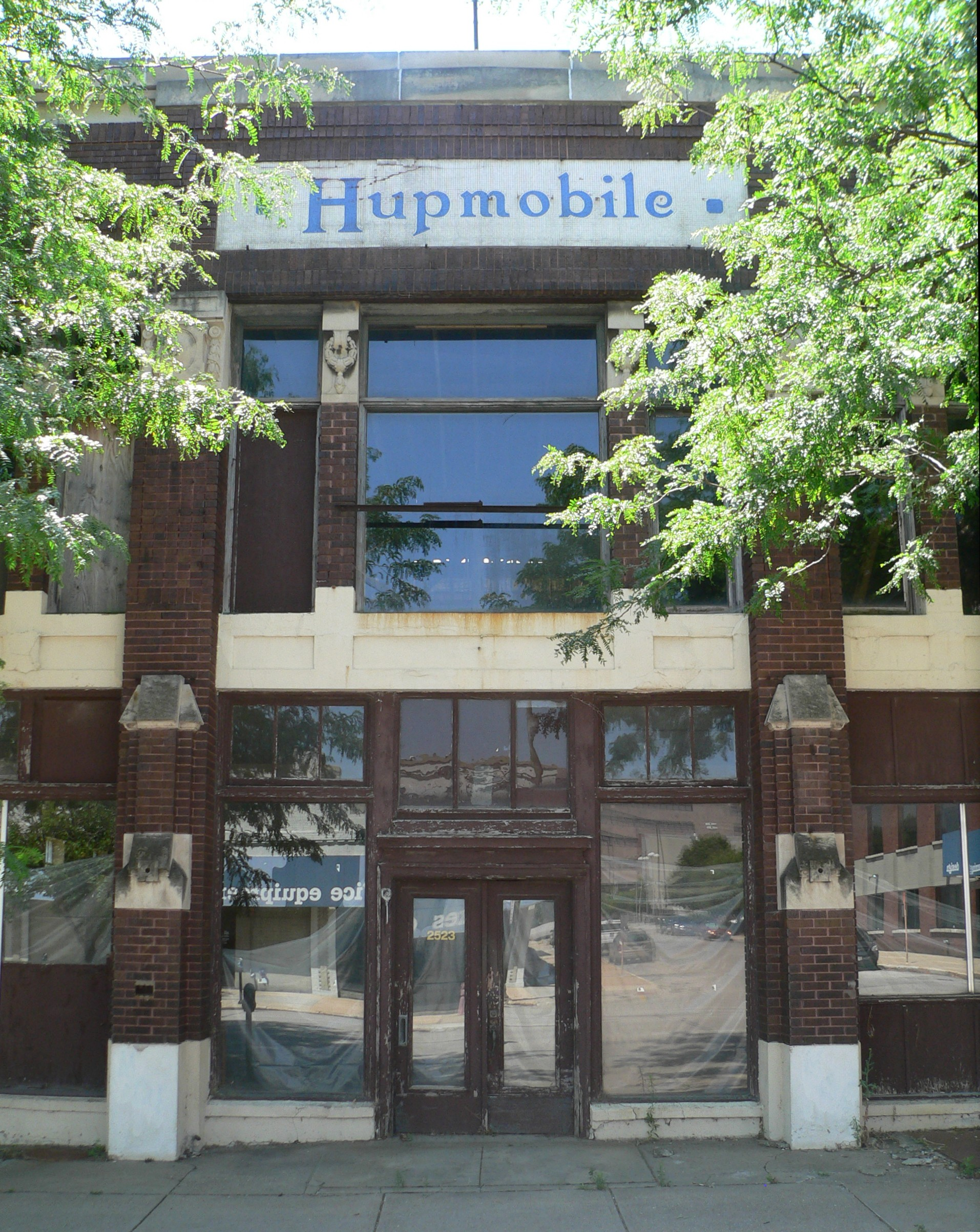
Hupmobile building

At its peak, as many as 60 different makes of automobiles were sold and repaired on Automobile Row. Current brands that formerly had showrooms on Automobile Row included Ford, Buick, Fiat, and Cadillac. Other marques with showrooms there that have since dissolved include Hudson, Hupmobile, and Pierce-Arrow. Currently, several car-related businesses stand along this stretch, although no dealers are still there.

Several of the buildings have been considered for inclusion on the National Register of Historic Places, including the Peerless Motor Company at 2562 Harney Street and the Hupmobile Building at 2523 Farnam Street. Today, the street is the location of "the only Hupmobile dealership left in the U.S. today."

There were many events on Automobile Row supported by the Omaha Autodealers Show Association. They included an annual "garage show" and carnival that was noted for its incandescent lightbulbs and the draw of car dealers. A national journal for car dealers reported that, "The promise of bumper crops in the state is leading all of the automobile men to predict record sales this fall."

== See also ==
- History of Omaha, Nebraska
