= Frank Parker Archeological Site =

- U.S. National Register of Historic Places
- Nearest city: Florence, Nebraska
- Area: 12 acres (4.9 ha)
- MPS: Archeological Resources of the Metro Omaha Management Unit MPS
- NRHP reference No.: 09000069
- Added to NRHP: March 4, 2009

The Frank Parker Archeological Site, in Douglas and Washington counties, Nebraska, near Florence, Nebraska, is an archeological site which was listed on the National Register of Historic Places in 2009. It is associated with Frank Parker and has designations 25WN1 and 25DO169.

It is a prehistoric village site and a processing site and was listed for its potential to yield information in the future.

Frank Parker (1888–1957) was a person who owned property in Florence that he inherited from eccentric William Frederick Parker (1854–1902). William Frederick Parker, a Gatsby-like character, was known as "the Hermit of Florence".

The Parker Manson was located at what is now 3021 Vane St., on the edge of the Florence Field neighborhood. It had been built on the site "of the Mormon campground from the 1840s Winter Quarters settlement". The Parker farm property eventually was split up: 80 acres (32 ha) became the city of Omaha's Miller Park; the Minne Lusa and Florence Field subdivisions were split out and developed in the 1910s and 1920s.
