= Omaha Bolt, Nut and Screw Building =

- U.S. National Register of Historic Places
- Omaha Landmark
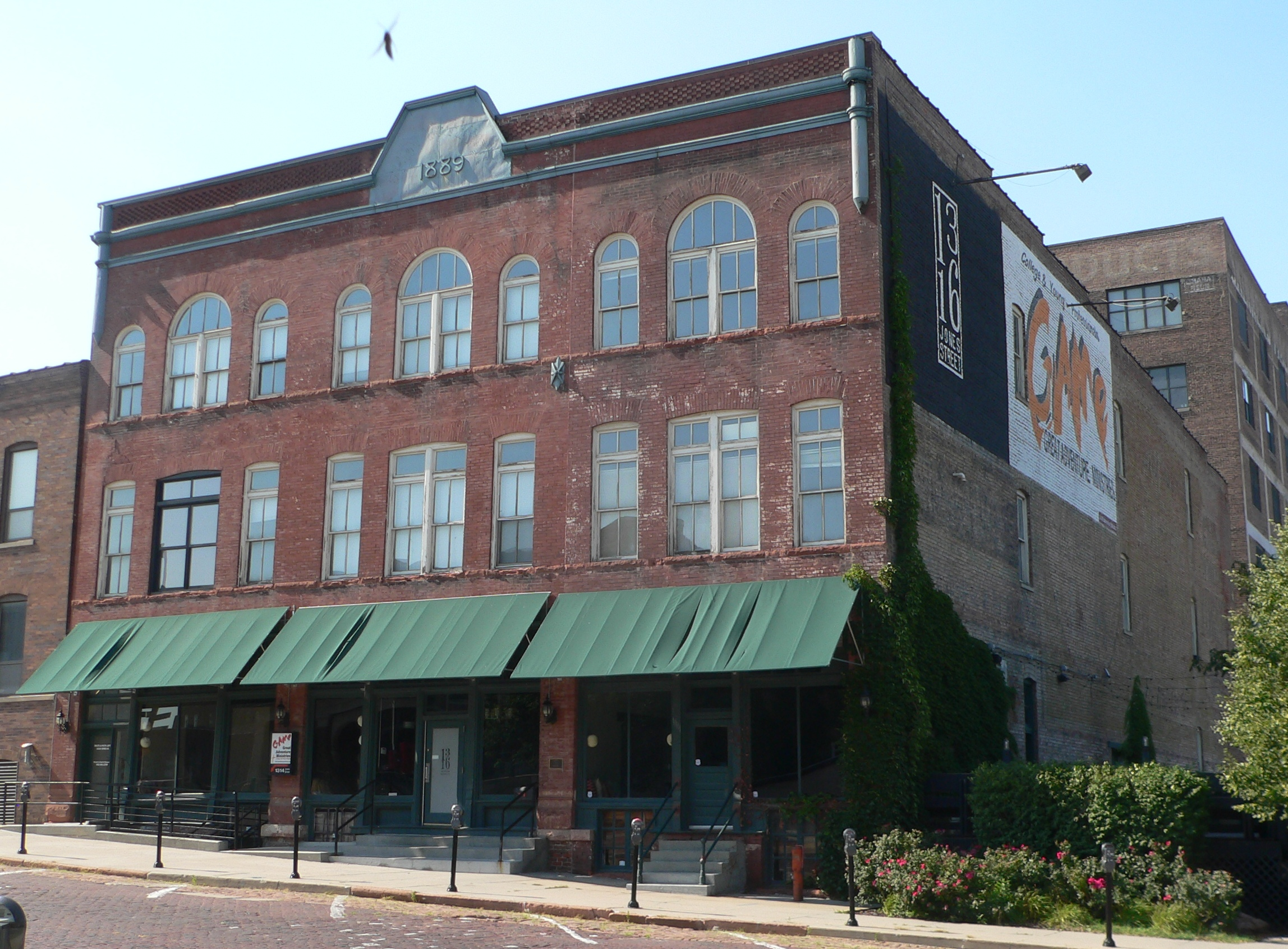

- Location within Nebraska Location within the United States
- Location: 1316 Jones St., Omaha, Nebraska
- Coordinates: 41°15′13″N 95°56′1″W
- Built: 1889
- Architect: Henry Voss
- Architectural style: Romanesque, Richardsonian Romanesque
- MPS: Warehouses in Omaha MPS
- NRHP reference No.: 92000816

Significant dates
- Added to NRHP: July 10, 1992
- Designated OMAL: July 28, 1992

The Omaha Bolt, Nut and Screw Building is a warehouse building at in Omaha, Nebraska, that was built in 1889. It was designed by architect Henry Voss for the Omaha Bolt, Nut & Screw Company, a hardware distributor based in Omaha. It was listed on the National Register of Historic Places in 1992 as part of a multiple property submission with other warehouses in Omaha that were part of an economically important "wholesale jobbing" industry that sprang up, taking advantage of Omaha's location and transportation links.
