= Poppleton Block =

- U.S. National Register of Historic Places
- Omaha Landmark
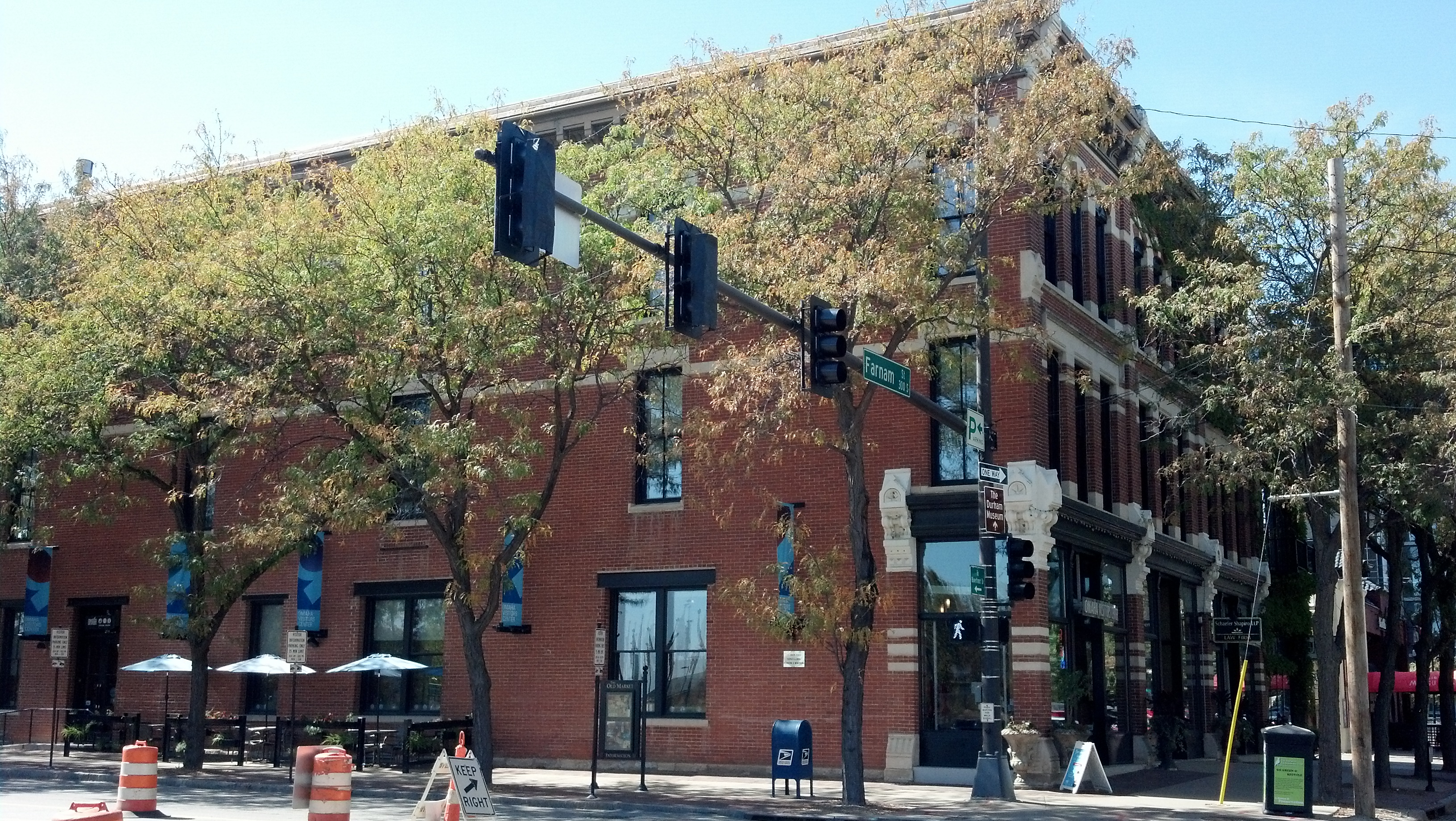

- Location within Nebraska
- Location: Omaha, Nebraska
- Coordinates: 41°15′26.15″N 95°55′44.89″W
- Built: 1880
- Architect: Henry Voss
- Architectural style: Italianate
- NRHP reference No.: 82000606

Significant dates
- Added to NRHP: October 7, 1982
- Designated OMAL: July 13, 1982

The Poppleton Block is located at 1001 Farnam Street in Downtown Omaha, Nebraska. The building was built in 1880 for Omaha lawyer and politician A.J. Poppleton, and was designated an Omaha Landmark on July 13, 1982, and was listed on the National Register of Historic Places later that year.

== About ==
Designed by architect Henry Voss in the High Victorian Italianate style, the City of Omaha Landmarks Heritage Preservation Commission says it, "exemplifies the type of commercial building constructed in Omaha before the turn-of-the-century."

Poppleton used part of the three-story building to house his law firm but never actually worked there himself. The rest was leased out as office and commercial space. Over the years it continued to be used primarily for commercial purposes, and today it is still utilized as office space. The building includes heavily bracketed cornices and window openings that featuring a combination of round, segmental and stilted segmental arches. There are cast iron storefronts on the building, as well.

== See also ==
- History of Omaha
