= Champe-Fremont 1 Archeological Site =

- U.S. National Register of Historic Places
- Location: Address restricted
- Nearest city: Omaha, Nebraska
- Area: 125 acres (51 ha)
- NRHP reference No.: 75001091
- Added to NRHP: October 21, 1975

The Champe-Fremont 1 Archeological Site, in the vicinity of Omaha, Nebraska, is an archeological site which was listed on the National Register of Historic Places in 1975.
