= Anderson Building =

- The Anderson Building
- U.S. National Register of Historic Places
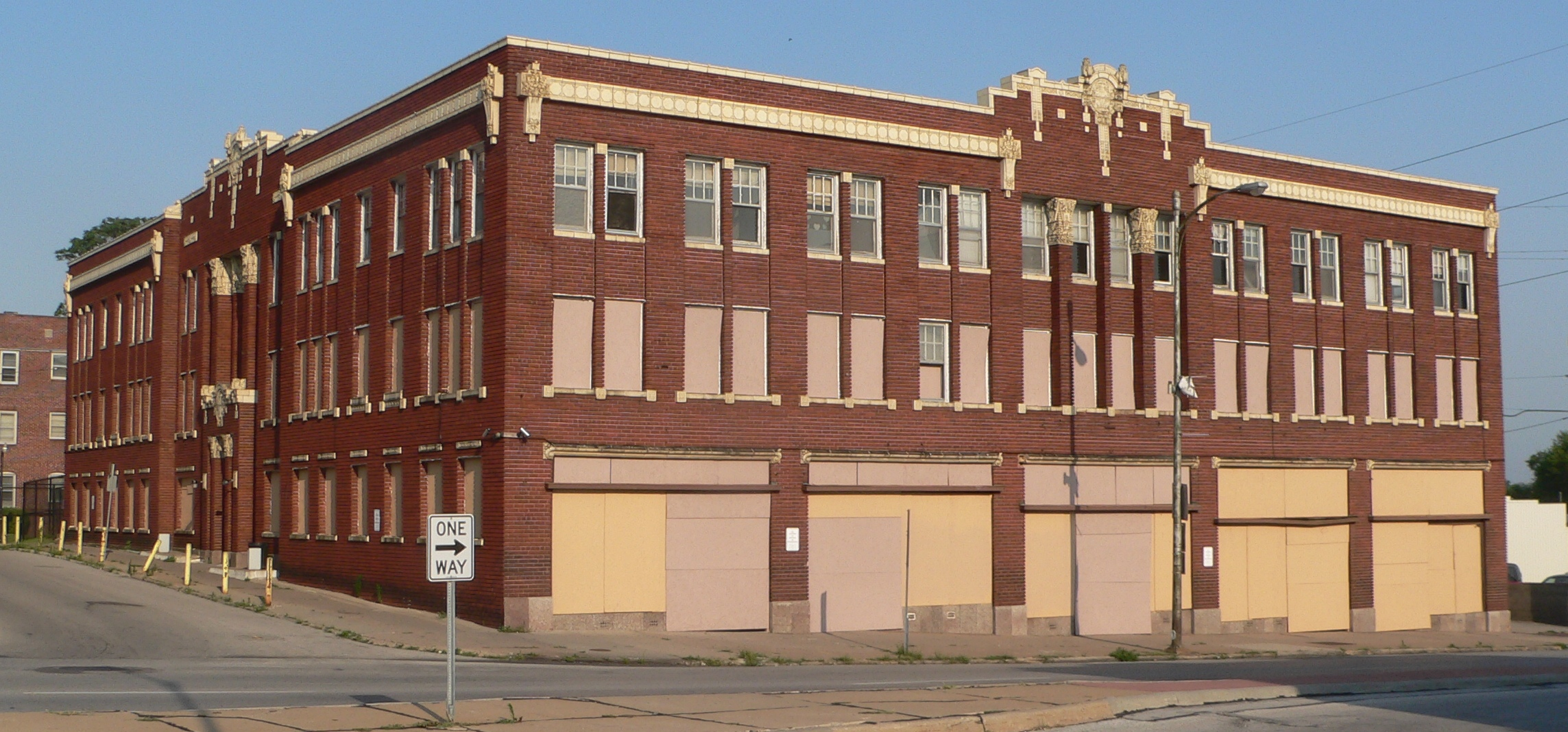
- View from the northeast

- Location within Nebraska Location within the United States
- Location: 701 S. 24th St., 2243 Jones, Omaha, Nebraska
- Coordinates: 41°15′10.8″N 95°56′48″W
- Area: less than 1 acre (0.40 ha)
- Built: 1924
- Architectural style: Sullivanesque
- MPS: Apartments, Flats and Tenements in Omaha, Nebraska from 1880-1962
- NRHP reference No.: 09000938
- Added to NRHP: November 20, 2009

The Anderson Building is a historic building located at 701 South 24th Street in Omaha, Nebraska, United States. It is a Sullivanesque-style building erected in 1924.

== History ==
The building was listed on the U.S. National Register of Historic Places on November 20, 2009. It "stands as a textbook example of the Sullivanesque design principals as promoted by the Midland Terra Cotta Company."

The listing was announced as the featured listing in the National Park Service's weekly list of November 27, 2009.

The building meets criteria assessed in the MPD study titled "Apartments, Flats and Tenements in Omaha, Nebraska from 1880-1962".
