= Park Avenue Apartment District =

Historic district in Nebraska, United States

- U.S. National Register of Historic Places
- U.S. Historic district
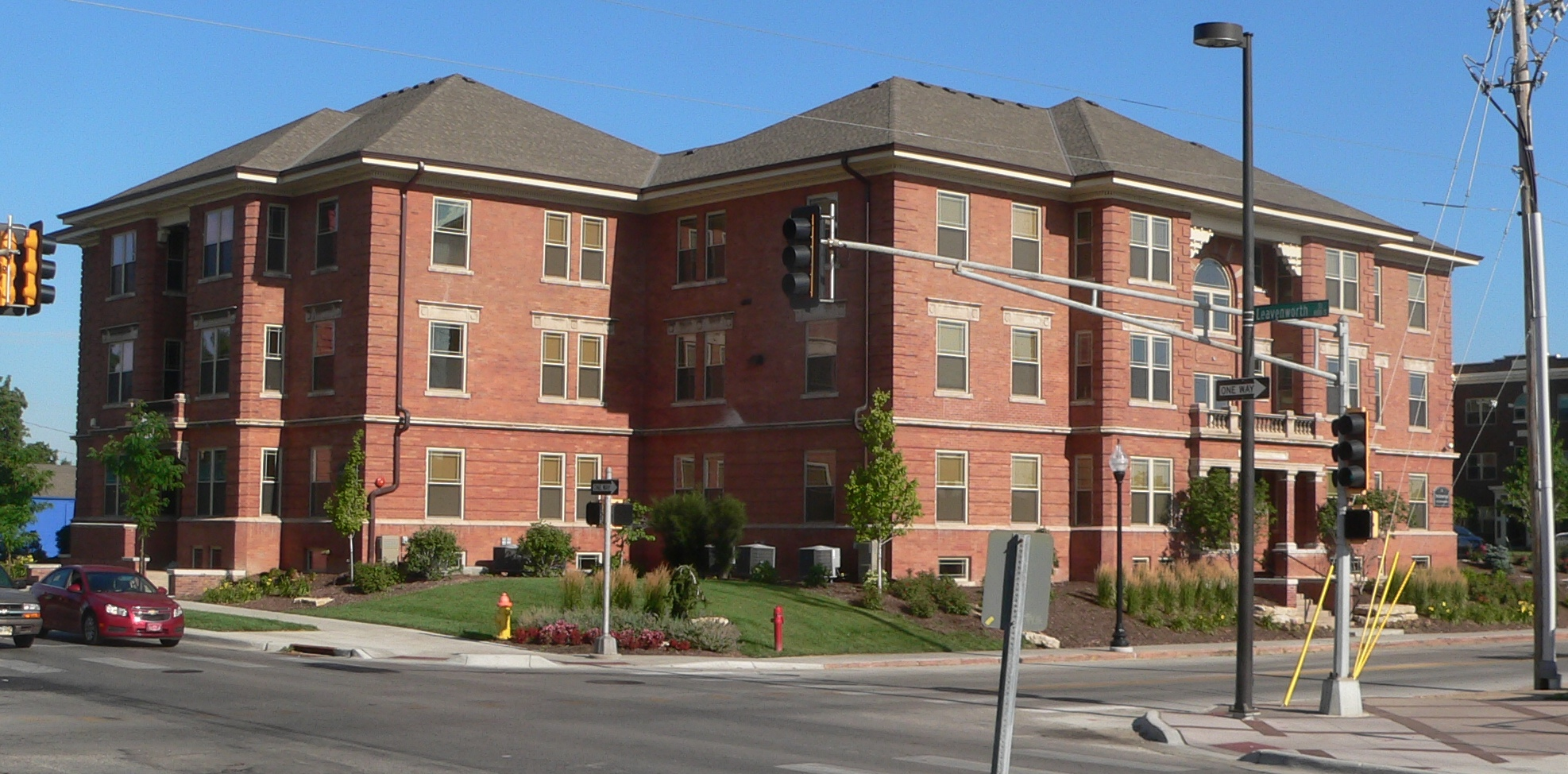
- Unitah Flats, seen from the southeast

- Location within Nebraska Location within the United States
- Location: 2935 Leavenworth St, 804 Park Ave, 803 S 30th St, 2934 Leavenworth St, 720 Park Ave, 721 S 30th St, Omaha, Nebraska
- Coordinates: 41.25241°N 95.95626°W
- Area: less than one acre
- Built: 1902
- Architect: Latenser, John Sr.
- Architectural style: Prairie School
- NRHP reference No.: 08000602
- Added to NRHP: July 2, 2008

The Park Avenue Apartment District is a historic district in Omaha, Nebraska that was listed on the National Register of Historic Places in 2008.

One component, the Portland, was built as the Barnard Apartment Building in 1902, and has been known as the Portland since 1917. It was designed by architect John Latenser, Sr. and is a three-story apartment building with three wings, forming a U-shape around a courtyard. It includes Italian Renaissance styling.

The Unitah, built two years later by the same owner and also with Latenser as architect, includes Prairie School design elements in its exterior. It was later renamed to be the Cantebury Square Apartments.
