= Selby Apartments =

- U.S. National Register of Historic Places
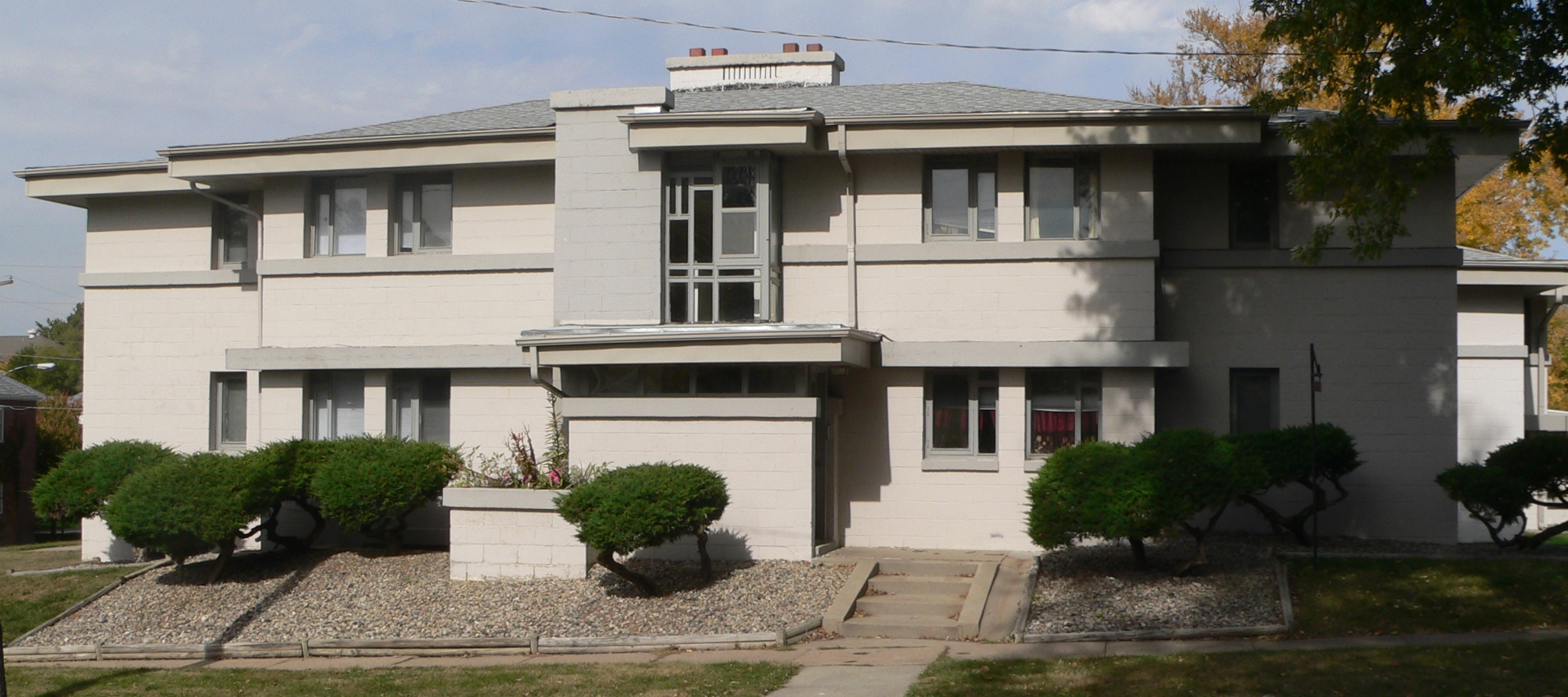
- One of three buildings in 2011

- Location within Nebraska Location within the United States
- Location: 830 South 37th Street, 3710 Marcy Street, 825 South 37th Avenue, Omaha, Nebraska
- Coordinates: 41°15′05″N 95°58′04″W
- Area: less than one acre
- Built: 1942
- Built by: Frank Selby
- Architect: Reinholdt F. Hennig
- Architectural style: Prairie School
- NRHP reference No.: 04001411
- Added to NRHP: December 30, 2004

Selby Apartments is a historic three-building apartment complex in Omaha, Nebraska, built in 1942. It was designed in the Prairie School style by architect Reinholdt F. Hennig, and was built by Frank Selby. It was listed on the National Register of Historic Places in 2004.
