= Ackerhurst Dairy Barn =

Historic barn in Nebraska, United States

- Ackerhurst–Eipperhurst Dairy Barn
- U.S. National Register of Historic Places
- Omaha Landmark
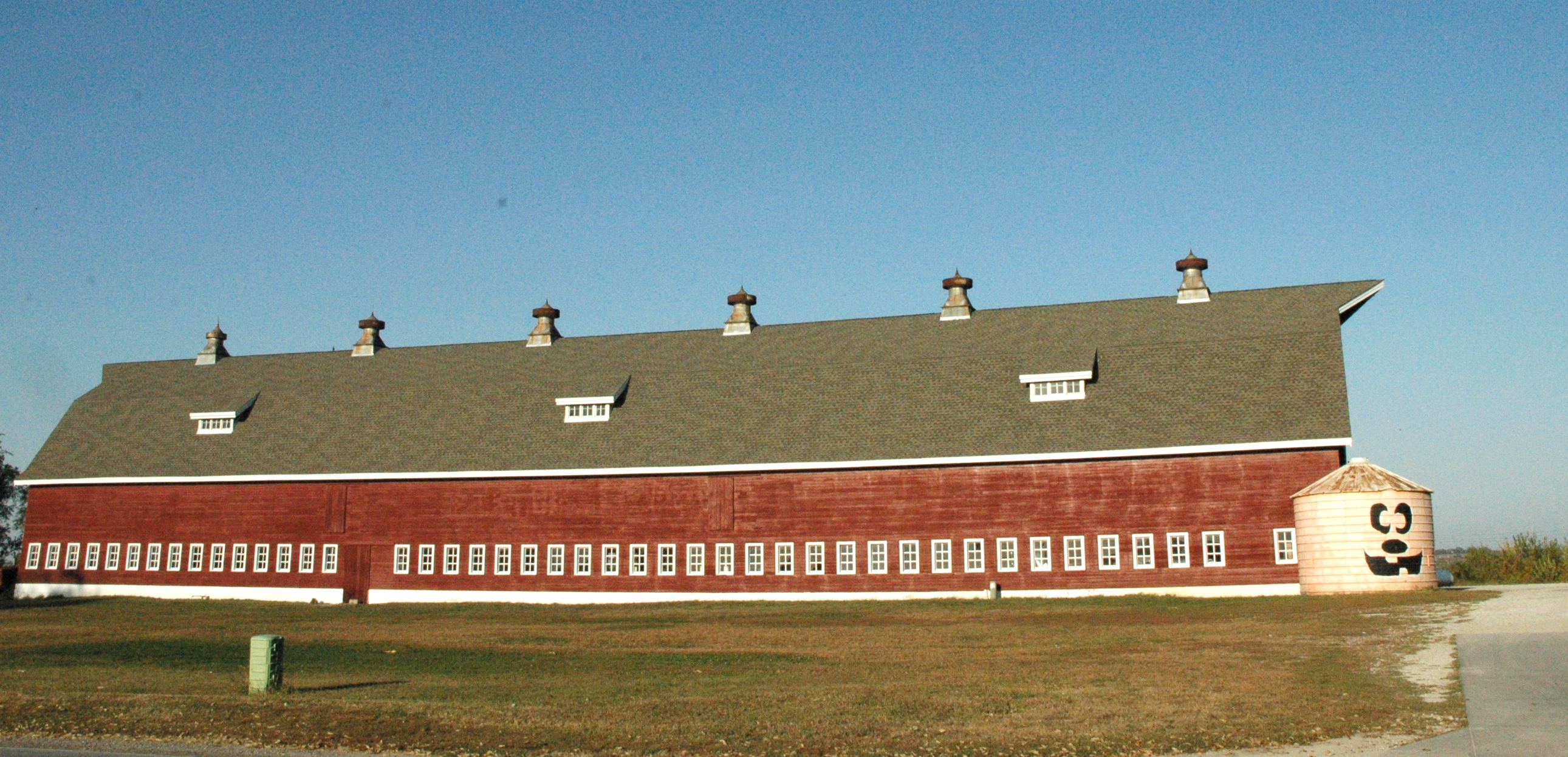

- Location within Nebraska Location within the United States
- Location: 15220 Military Rd.
- Nearest city: Bennington, Nebraska
- Coordinates: 41°20′12″N 96°9′10″W
- Area: less than one acre
- Built: 1935
- Architect: Adolph Otte
- Architectural style: Gambrel
- NRHP reference No.: 02000272

Significant dates
- Added to NRHP: March 28, 2002
- Designated OMAL: March 5, 2002

The Ackerhurst–Eipperhurst Dairy Barn is located at 15220 Military Road near Bennington, Nebraska, United States. Built in 1935 by Adolf Otte in the Gambrel (also known as Dutch Gambrel) style, the Barn was designated a "Landmark" by the City of Omaha Landmarks Heritage Preservation Commission on March 5, 2002, and listed on the National Register of Historic Places later that month.

To ensure the quality of the products, owner Anthony W. Ackerman put into place a few important factors. A veterinarian was on duty at all times, the milking machinery was state of the art stainless steel, and only the highest quality of hay was given to the cows.

The roof has a hay hood at each end.

== The Barn at the Ackerhurst Dairy Farm ==
In 2015, the barn on the Ackerhurst property was sold and converted into a small event venue. The first phase of a renovation was completed in 2016 after which small events were held. More extensive renovations were completed in 2017. As of 2021, the venue hosts events such as weddings, receptions, corporate meetings, and charity fundraisers. It seats up to 400 people.

== See also ==
- History of Omaha
- Landmarks in Omaha
