= Nicholas Street Historic District =

Historic district in Omaha, Nebraska

Coordinates: 41°16′12″N 95°55′57″W

The Nicholas Street Historic District is a historic district in downtown Omaha, Nebraska. It is roughly bounded by 11th Street on the east, 14th Street to the west, and centered around Nicholas Street.

== History ==
The Nicholas Street Historic District was a swarm of brick industrial buildings. It was founded near 1890 as a place to collect goods and ship them over the Missouri River. It was also originally a spot for residential purposes. It retained this motive in the central part of the district, but was cleared out in the south part when industrialization took over.

The district was surrounded on three sides by railroad tracks laid by Union Pacific. Its proximity to Union Pacific Railroads, being only a mile away, made it a prime spot for industrialization.

After the Great Depression, the area saw little change, and shrunk soon after. The appeal of the area was low after WWII, and with the changing industrial landscape in Omaha businesses began moving out. Many of the buildings in the area were bought up by the City of Omaha. Being surrounded on three sides by railroads, the area was hard to access and limited the number of people and businesses in the district.

== Modern developments ==
In 2009, it was listed on the National Register of Historic Places Since that time, the district has been subject to a redevelopment with the complete renovation of many of its historic structures, resurfacing of its streets and the marketing of its image. The Hot Shots Art Center and other buildings are included in this redevelopment as well. Some of the buildings are included in the Millwork Commons, a new neighborhood promoted by an architectural firm. As of 2024, there are also new buildings constructed and in the planning stages, including hotels, apartments, retail and more.
