= Military Avenue (Omaha) =

- Military Ave. Segment
- U.S. National Register of Historic Places
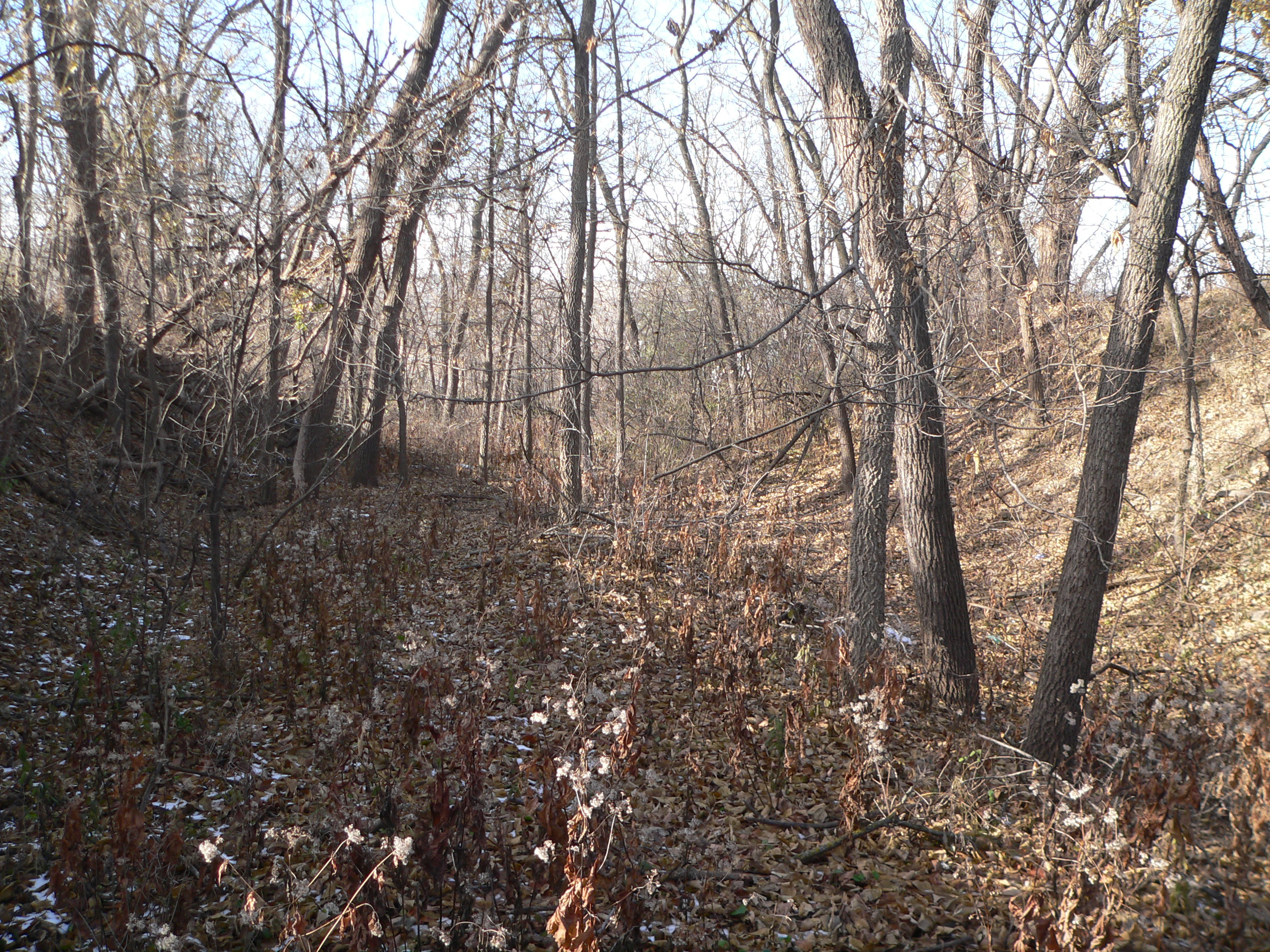
- Remains of Military Road wagon track

- Location within Nebraska Location within the United States
- Location: Omaha, Nebraska
- Coordinates: 41°18′31.29″N 96°2′34.37″W
- Built: 1858
- Architect: Capt. Edward Beckwith
- NRHP reference No.: 93001400
- Added to NRHP: December 10, 1993

Military Avenue is a central thoroughfare located in Omaha, Nebraska. A segment of the road located at the junction of West 82nd and Fort Streets was listed on the National Register of Historic Places in 1993. Today Military Road, which begins at Nebraska Highway 64 as Nebraska Highway L-28K, ends at Bennington Road near North 204th Street (Nebraska Highway 31).

== History ==
Originally part of the Overland Trail, Military Avenue was laid out from Downtown Omaha westward through the town of Benson and past in 1857 by Captain Edward Beckwith for the U.S. Army. Originally designated as a shipment road for moving military supplies to Fort Kearny, thousands of travelers moving to the Pacific Northwest used the road for the next fifty years. Purposely laid out over high ground, emigrants and freighters had a clear view of the surrounding country as a protection against attacks.

== Currently ==
The original graded wagon track can be seen near the Omaha Public Power District substation located near North 90th and Fort Streets. A section of the road is listed on the National Register of Historic Places.

== See also ==
- Ackerhurst Dairy Barn
- Benson, Nebraska

== Elsewhere online ==
- "A History of the Military Road in North Omaha" by Adam Fletcher Sasse for NorthOmahaHistory.com
