= Anheuser-Busch Beer Depot =

- U.S. National Register of Historic Places
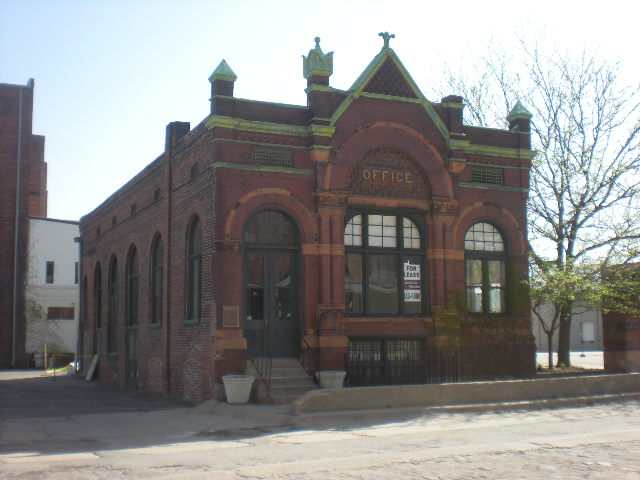

- Location within Nebraska Location within the United States
- Location: 1207-1215 Jones Street, Omaha, Nebraska
- Coordinates: 41.2531430202269°N 95.9326415774639°W
- Architect: Henry Voss
- Architectural style: Romanesque Revival
- NRHP reference No.: 79001440
- Added to NRHP: February 1, 1979

The Anheuser-Busch Beer Depot is located at 1213 Jones Street in downtown Omaha, Nebraska. Omaha architect Henry Voss designed the complex for the Anheuser-Busch Brewing Association of St. Louis, Missouri in 1887.

Once covering more than a block, today the Anheuser-Busch Office Building is the only remaining structure of what was the original Krug Brewery, the largest brewery among Omaha's original "Big 4" brewers. Anheuser-Busch took over the facilities after buying Krug. The office building is one of the most elaborate examples of the Romanesque Revival style in Omaha. The Depot once included a stable, beer vault/ice house, famous gold basement and cobblestone alley.

== See also ==
- History of Omaha
