= Hupmobile Building =

- U.S. National Register of Historic Places
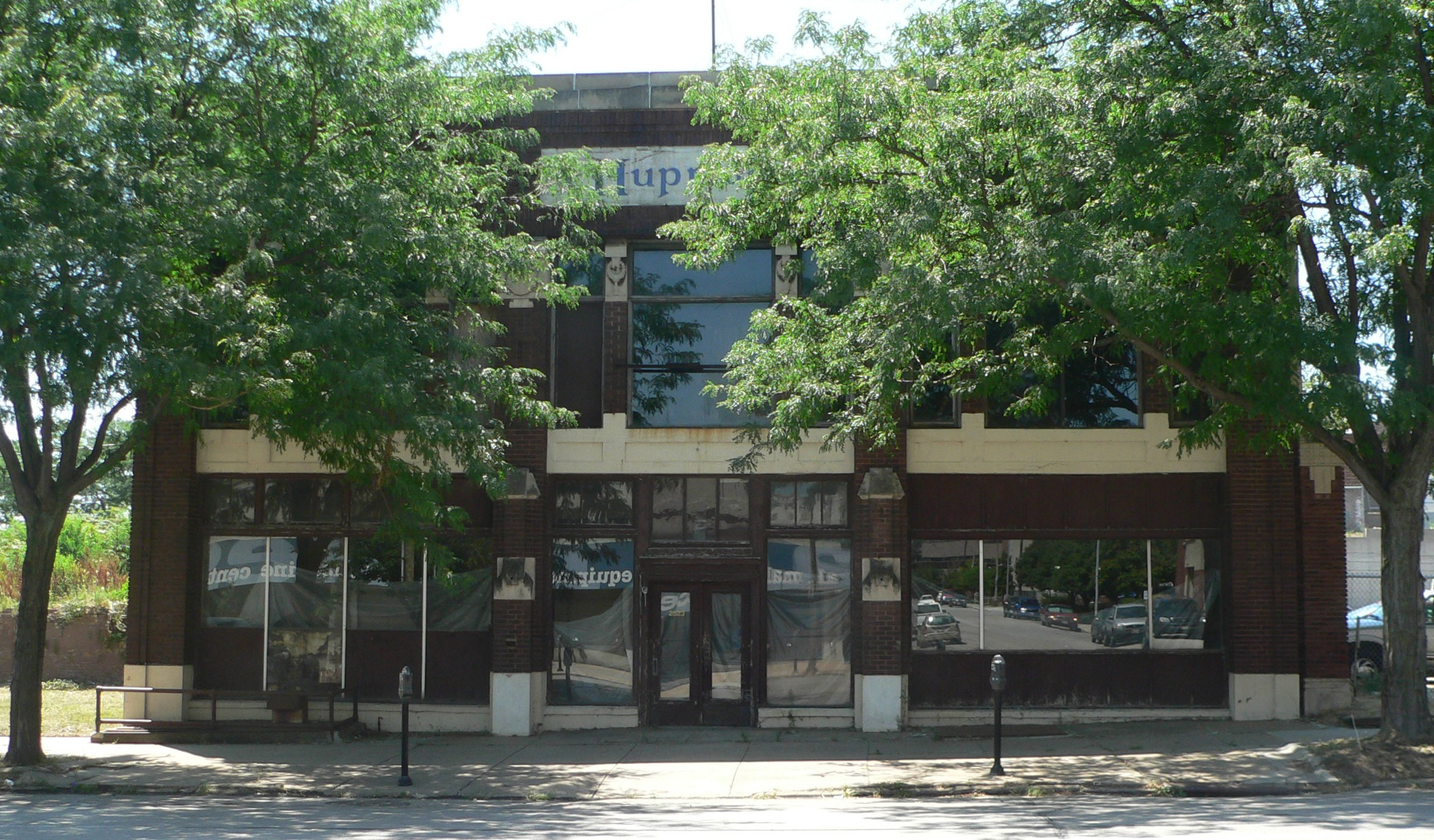
- View from Farnam Street

- Location within Nebraska
- Location: 2523 Farnam Street, Omaha, Nebraska
- Coordinates: 41.257375709405196°N 95.94933557638457°W
- Built: 1917
- NRHP reference No.: 14000909

The Hupmobile Building is located at 2523 Farnam Street in Midtown Omaha, Nebraska. Built in 1917 on the city's historic Auto Row, the building was an early Hupmobile dealership. It was listed on the National Register of Historic Places in 2014.

The building was built as a dealership, service shop, and factory branch for Hupmobile. In 1925, the Hupmobile dealership was moved to a larger building at 20th and Harney Streets. The Farnam Street building was used by several other automobile dealerships until 1940, selling brands including Hudson, Willys Knight, and Terraplane. The building housed a flight school from 1941-1943, and the Sterling Manufacturing Company 1943-2003. Sterling produced coffins, ship parts, and water heaters during World War II.

== See also ==
- Hupmobile Dealership (Washington, D.C.)
- Lincoln Highway (Omaha)
