= List of historic houses in Nebraska =

Nebraska has many historic houses. The following list includes houses, apartments, rowhouses and other places of residence that are independently listed or included in historic districts on the National Register of Historic Places, or as officially designated Omaha Landmarks:

- (1879) General George Crook House, present-day Building 11B at Fort Omaha, North Omaha; listed on the National Register of Historic Places in 1969
- (1881) Memmen Apartments, 2214, 2216, 2218, and 2220 Florence Boulevard, North Omaha
- (1884) Fort Omaha officer housing (present-day Building 3), North Omaha; listed as part of the Fort Omaha Historic District on the National Register of Historic Places in 1974
- (1884) Fort Omaha officer quarters (present-day Building 9), North Omaha; listed as part of the Fort Omaha Historic District on the National Register of Historic Places in 1974
- (1884) Fort Omaha officer quarters (present-day Building 11A), North Omaha; listed as part of the Fort Omaha Historic District on the National Register of Historic Places in 1974
- (1885) Mercer Mansion, 3920 Cuming Street, North Omaha; listed on the National Register of Historic Places in 1976
- (1887) John P. Bay House, 2024 Binney Street, North Omaha
- (1887) Fort Omaha quartermaster's mule barn, North Omaha; listed as part of the Fort Omaha Historic District on the National Register of Historic Places in 1974
- (1887) George H. Kelly House, 1924 Binney Street, North Omaha
- (1888) Zabriskie Mansion, 3524 Hawthorne Avenue, North Omaha; listed on the National Register of Historic Places in 1978 and designated an Omaha Landmark in 1980
- (1888) Zabriskie Carriage House, 1111 North 36th Street, North Omaha
- (1890) Garneau-Kilpatrick House, 3100 Chicago Street, North Omaha; listed on the National Register of Historic Places in 1982 and designated an Omaha Landmark in 1980
- (1897) The Sherman, 2501 North 16th Street, North Omaha; listed on the National Register of Historic Places in 1986
- (1913) Broomfield Rowhouse, 2502-2504 Lake St., North Omaha; listed on the National Register of Historic Places in 2007
- (1905) Epeneter House, 502 N. 40th St., North Omaha; listed as part of the Gold Coast Historic District the National Register of Historic Places in 1979
- (1905) Keirle House, 3017 Mormon St., North Omaha; designated an Omaha Landmark in 1997
- (1910) Lizzie Robinson House, 2864 Corby St., North Omaha; listed on the National Register of Historic Places in 1993 and designated an Omaha Landmark in 1992
- (1902) Porter/Thomsen Residence, 3426 Lincoln Boulevard, North Omaha; listed on the National Register of Historic Places in 1982 and designated an Omaha Landmark in 1981
- (1903) George F. Shepard House, 1802 Wirt St., North Omaha; designated an Omaha Landmark in 1981
- (1907) Charles Storz House, 1901 Wirt St., North Omaha; designated an Omaha Landmark in 1984
- (1929) Harry Buford House, 1804 N. 30th St., North Omaha; designated an Omaha Landmark in 1983
- (1929) Henry B. Neef House, 2884 Iowa St., North Omaha; listed on the National Register of Historic Places in 2010
- (1908) John E. Reagan House, 2102 Pinkney Street, North Omaha; listed on the National Register of Historic Places in 2014
- (1919) Allas Apartments, 1609 Wirt Street, North Omaha; listed on the National Register of Historic Places in 2015 and designated an Omaha Landmark in 2016
- (1929) Apartments at 2514 N. 16th Street, North Omaha; listed on the National Register of Historic Places in 2010
- (1925) The Nottingham Apartments, 3304 Burt Street, North Omaha; listed on the National Register of Historic Places in 2013
- (1926) Notre Dame Apartments, 3501 State St., North Omaha; listed on the National Register of Historic Places in 1998 and named an Omaha Landmark in 1998
- (1916) The Margaret, 2103 N. 16th Street, North Omaha; listed on the National Register of Historic Places in 2007
- (1916) Melrose Apartments, 602 N. 33rd St., North Omaha; listed on the National Register of Historic Places in 1989 and designated an Omaha Landmark in 1982
- (1905) Ernie Chambers Court (formerly Strehlow Terrace), 2024 and 2107 N. 16th Street, North Omaha; listed on the National Register of Historic Places in 1986
- Malcolm X House Site, North Omaha
- Joslyn Castle
- Arbor Lodge
- Bowring Ranch
- Comstock-Bixby House
- Gerald R. Ford Birthsite
- George W. Frank Museum of History and Culture, Kearney
- Havens-Page House
- Mayhew Cabin
- Wright Morris Boyhood House

== See also ==
- Architecture in North Omaha, Nebraska
