= Lists of historic houses =

List of historic houses is a link page for any stately home or historic house.

== Australia ==
- List of historic homesteads in Australia
- List of historic houses in South Australia
- Houses in New South Wales
  - Houses in Sydney
  - List of heritage houses in Sydney

== Belgium ==
- List of castles and châteaux in Belgium
- List of houses of the Grand-Place

== China ==
- Hangzhou historic houses

== Denmark ==
- List of historic houses in Denmark
- List of historic houses in metropolitan Copenhagen

== Estonia ==
- List of palaces and manor houses in Estonia

== France ==
- List of châteaux in France

== Ireland ==
- List of country houses in County Carlow
- List of historic houses in the Republic of Ireland

== Italy ==
- List of palaces in Italy

== Latvia ==
- List of palaces and manor houses in Latvia

== Mexico ==
- List of historic house museums in Mexico

== Philippines ==
- Heritage houses of the Philippines
- Historic houses in Santa Ana, Manila
- Historic houses in Santa Rita, Pampanga

== Sweden ==
- List of castles and palaces in Sweden

== United Kingdom ==
- List of country houses in the United Kingdom
- Estate houses in Scotland

== United States ==
- List of largest houses in the United States
- List of historic mansions in the United States
- List of plantations in Alabama
- List of historic houses in Florida
- List of historic houses and buildings in Savannah, Georgia
- List of historic houses in Kentucky
- List of plantations in Louisiana
- List of historic houses in Massachusetts
  - First Period houses in Massachusetts (1620–1659)
  - First Period houses in Massachusetts (1660–1679)
- List of plantations in Mississippi
- List of historic houses in Missouri
- List of historic houses in Nebraska
- List of historic houses in Pennsylvania
  - List of houses in Fairmount Park
- List of historic houses in Virginia

== See also ==
- United States National Register of Historic Places listings
- List of abbeys and priories
- List of buildings and structures
- List of castles
- Lists of museums
