= Johnston Memorial Building =

- U.S. National Register of Historic Places
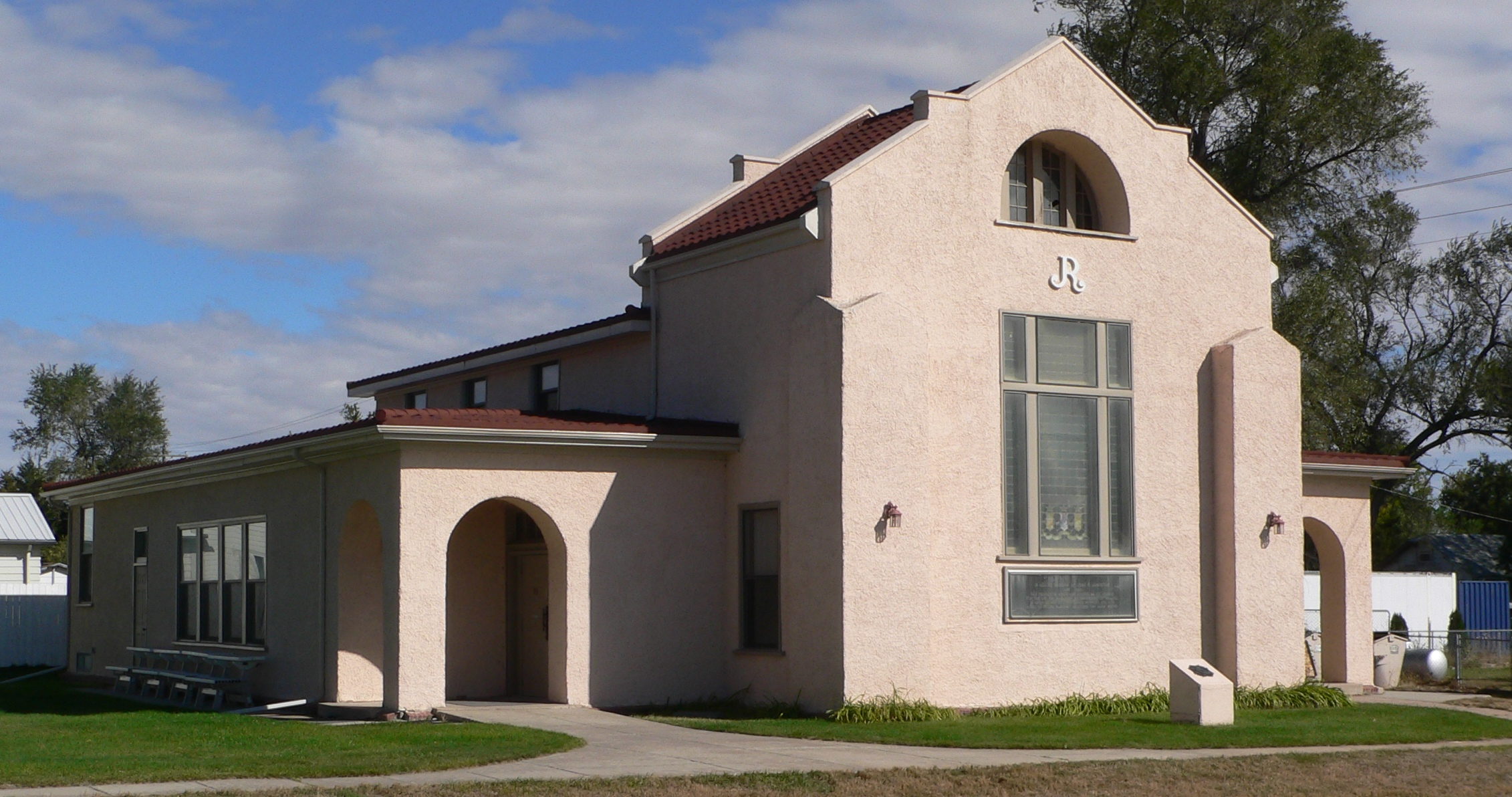
- The building in 2011

- Location within Nebraska Location within the United States
- Location: Off NE 25, Wallace, Nebraska
- Coordinates: 40°50′22″N 101°09′50″W
- Area: less than one acre
- Built: 1921
- Built by: McMichael Bros.
- Architect: Francis W. Fitzpatrick
- Architectural style: Prairie School, Bungalow/craftsman
- NRHP reference No.: 86000473
- Added to NRHP: March 20, 1986

The Johnston Memorial Building is a historic building in Wallace, Nebraska. It was built in 1921 in memory of John R. Johnston, the founder of the Johnston Brokerage Company, a Pittsburgh, Pennsylvania-based window glass manufacturing company, who vacationed in Wallace. The building was designed in a "pleasing" combination of Prairie School and Craftsman styles by noted architect Francis W. Fitzpatrick. It was built by McMichael Bros. It has been listed on the National Register of Historic Places since March 20, 1986.
