= National Register of Historic Places listings in Lincoln County, Nebraska =

Location of Lincoln County in Nebraska

Lincoln County, Nebraska, United States, has 11 properties and districts listed on the National Register of Historic Places, one of which is a National Historic Landmark.

The locations of National Register properties and districts for which the latitude and longitude coordinates are included below may be seen in a map.

This National Park Service list is complete through NPS recent listings posted October 30, 2026.

== Current listings ==
	Name on the Register	Image	Date listed	Location	City or town	Description
1	Fort McPherson National Cemetery	Fort McPherson National Cemetery	March 7, 2012 (#12000075)	12004 S. Spur 56A; 41°01′33″N 100°31′30″W	Maxwell vicinity	
2	Fox Theatre	Fox Theatre	May 9, 1985 (#85000957)	301 E. 5th 41°08′14″N 100°45′36″W	North Platte	
3	Hotel Yancey	Hotel Yancey	May 9, 1985 (#85000956)	221 E. 5th St. 41°08′15″N 100°45′37″W	North Platte	
4	Johnston Memorial Building	Johnston Memorial Building	March 20, 1986 (#86000473)	Off Nebraska Highway 25; 40°50′22″N 101°09′52″W	Wallace	
5	Lincoln County Courthouse	Lincoln County Courthouse	January 10, 1990 (#89002224)	301 N. Jeffers St. 41°08′10″N 100°45′45″W	North Platte	
6	Nebraskan Gateway	Nebraskan Gateway	July 7, 2026 (#100012972)	Brady Rest Area Westbound, Interstate 80, MM 193.75; 41°02′07″N 100°28′00″W	Brady vicinity	
7	North Platte Commercial Historic District	North Platte Commercial Historic District	July 1, 2020 (#100005338)	South: 4th St. to Front St., Vine St. to Chestnut St. North: 7th St. to 9th St., Vine St. to Dewey St. 41°08′15″N 100°45′42″W	North Platte	
8	North Platte US Post Office and Federal Building	North Platte US Post Office and Federal Building	March 4, 2009 (#09000071)	416 North Jeffers Street; 41°08′12″N 100°45′48″W	North Platte	
9	O'Fallons Bluff	O'Fallons Bluff	July 12, 1974 (#74001127)	Southeast of Sutherland; 41°08′11″N 101°05′41″W	Sutherland	
10	Scout's Rest Ranch	Scout's Rest Ranch	January 30, 1978 (#78001705)	Northwest of North Platte off U.S. Route 30; 41°09′48″N 100°47′42″W	North Platte	Designated a National Historic Landmark in 2021.
11	Sutherland State Aid Bridge	Sutherland State Aid Bridge	June 29, 1992 (#92000705)	County road over the North Platte River, 4.2 miles (6.8 km) north of Sutherland; 41°12′36″N 101°07′02″W	Sutherland	

== See also ==
- List of National Historic Landmarks in Nebraska
- National Register of Historic Places listings in Nebraska
