= West Farnam Apartments =

Coordinates: 41°15′21″N 95°58′13″W

- U.S. Historic district – Contributing property
- Omaha Landmark
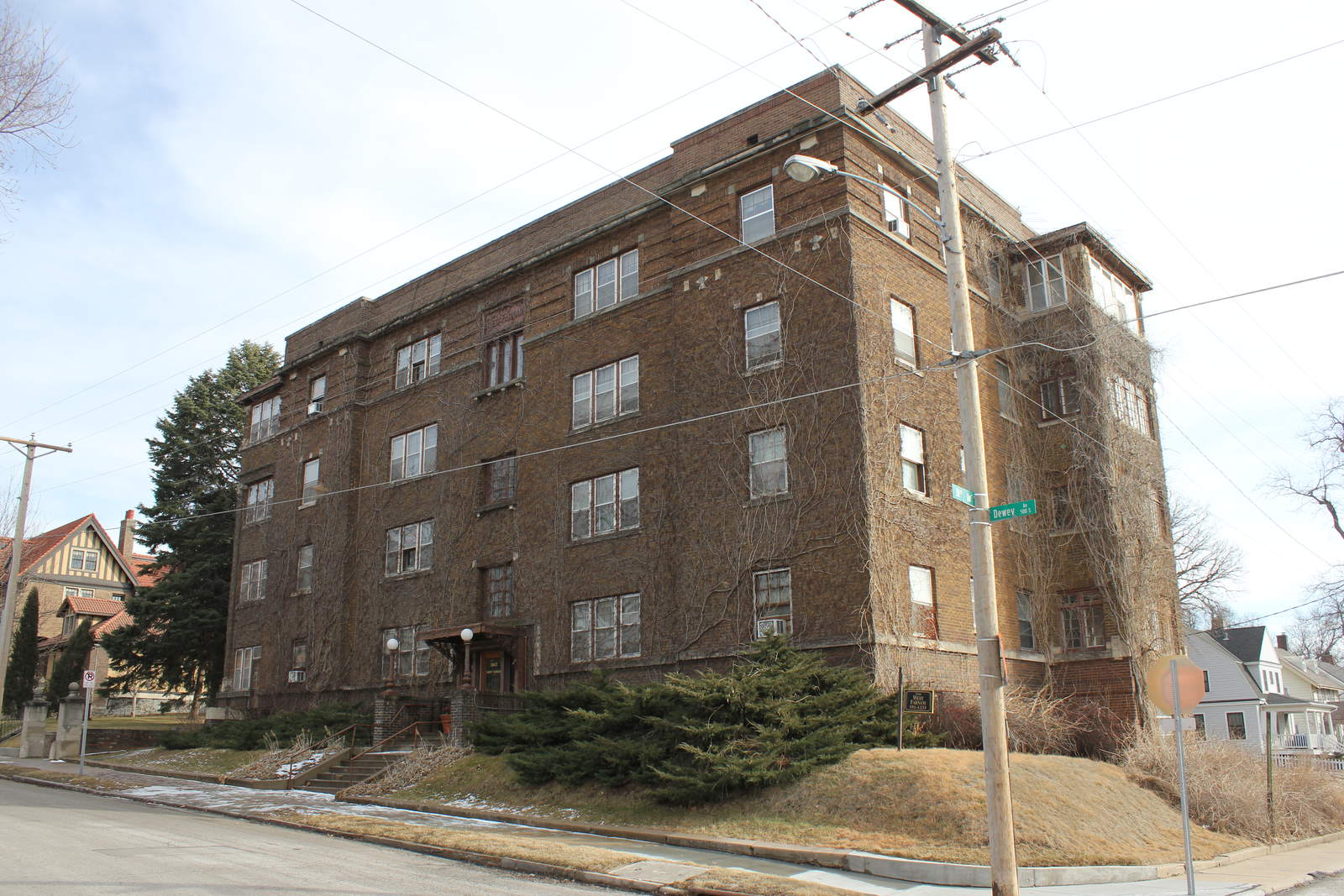

- Location within Nebraska Location within the United States
- Location: 3817 Dewey Avenue Omaha, Nebraska
- Built: 1912
- Architect: Frederick A. Henninger
- Architectural style: Renaissance Revival
- Part of: Gold Coast Historic District (ID97000237)

Significant dates
- Added to NRHP: March 14, 1997
- Designated OMAL: September 25, 1979

The West Farnam Apartments are located at 3817 Dewey Avenue in Midtown Omaha, Nebraska. The building was reportedly the first luxury apartment building constructed in Omaha.

== Architecture ==
Built in 1912 from a design by locally renowned architect Frederick A. Henninger, the apartments were designated an Omaha Landmark on September 25, 1979. A contributing property to Omaha's Gold Coast neighborhood, the West Farnam was designed with many luxuries in a combined Italian Renaissance Revival and Prairie Style. The building originally featured an electric elevator, a hand-fired coal furnace, a row of steam-heated garages and a large flower garden.
