= List of historic houses in Pennsylvania =

This is a list of historic houses in the US state of Pennsylvania.

== Delaware County ==
- Allgates
- Cobble Court
- Nitre Hall
- Federal School
- Grange Estate

== Philadelphia ==
- List of houses in Fairmount Park

== See also ==
- List of historic houses
