= Rose Realty-Securities Building =

- Rose Realty--Securities Building
- U.S. National Register of Historic Places
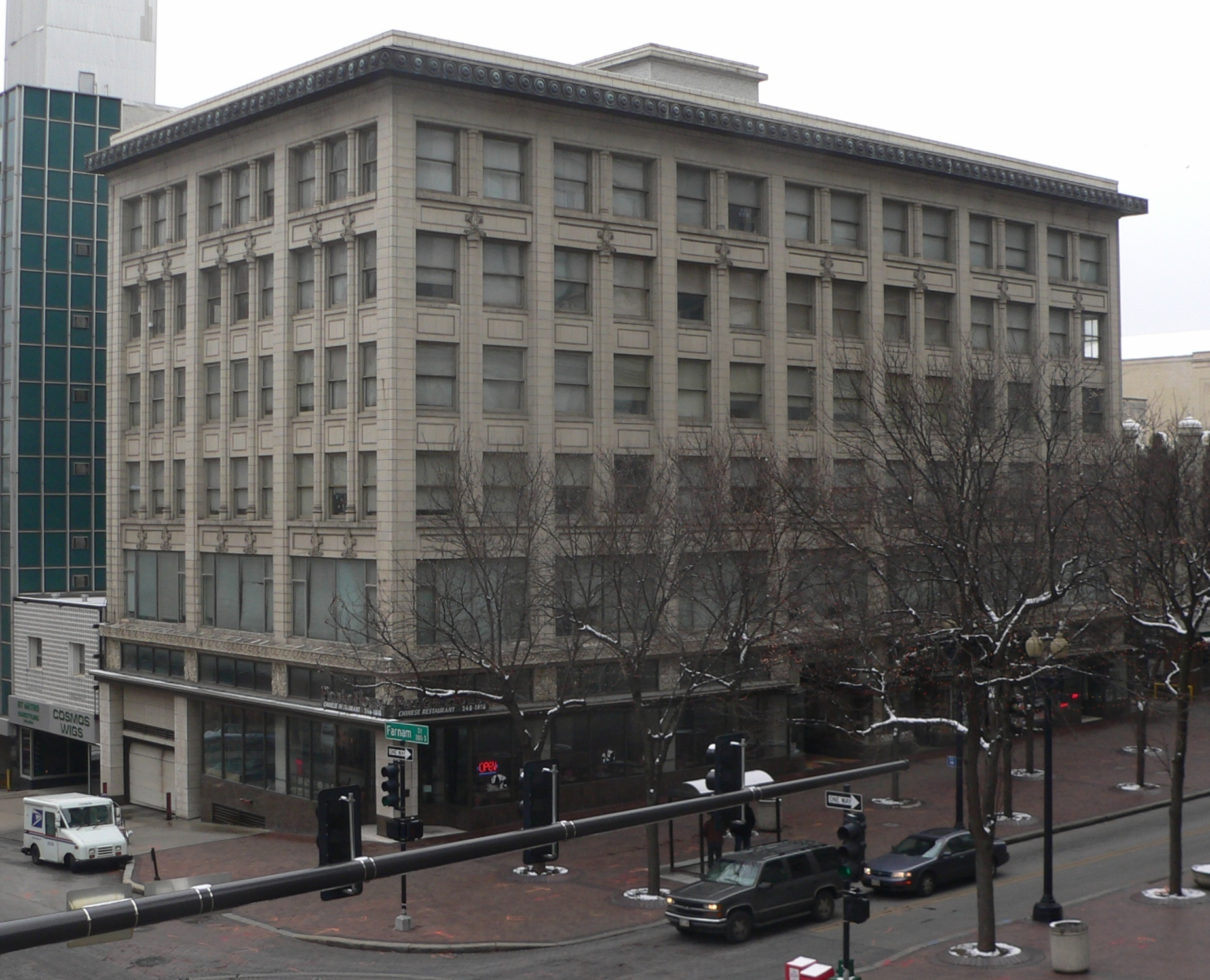
- The building in 2012

- Location within Nebraska Location within the United States
- Location: 305 South 16th Street, Omaha, Nebraska
- Coordinates: 41°15′26″N 95°56′12″W
- Area: less than one acre
- Built: 1916
- Built by: John H. Harte
- Architect: Fredrick A. Henninger
- Architectural style: Chicago school
- NRHP reference No.: 96000766
- Added to NRHP: July 19, 1996

The Rose Realty-Securities Building is a historic six-story building in Omaha, Nebraska. It was built by John H. Harte for the Rose Realty Company in 1916, and designed in Chicago school style by architect Frederick A. Henninger. The first floor was used for stores while the upper floors were rented as offices. The corner of 16th and Farnam was a Union Pacific ticket office from 1917 to 1941. The building has been listed on the National Register of Historic Places since July 19, 1996.
