= Fox Theatre (North Platte, Nebraska) =

- U.S. National Register of Historic Places
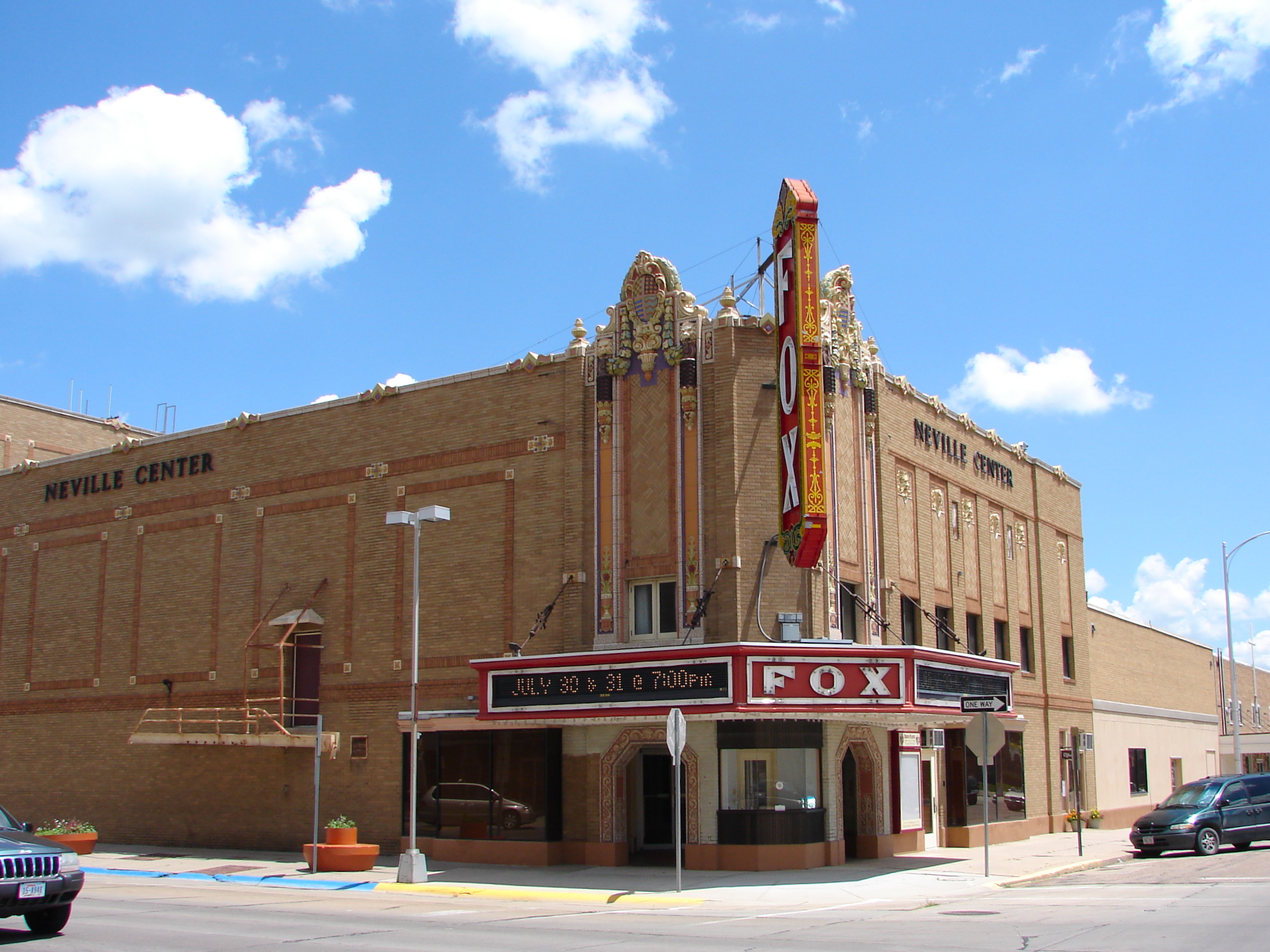
- The theater in 2010

- Location within Nebraska Location within the United States
- Location: 301 East 5th, North Platte, Nebraska
- Coordinates: 41°08′14″N 100°45′36″W
- Area: less than one acre
- Built: 1929
- Built by: Alex Beck
- Architect: F. A. Henninger
- NRHP reference No.: 85000957
- Added to NRHP: May 9, 1985

Fox Theatre, also known as the Neville Center For The Performing Arts, is a historic building in North Platte, Nebraska. It was built in 1929 by Alex Beck for the North Platte Realty Company, headed by Beck and Keith Neville, and it was designed by architect F. A. Henninger. Neville had served as the 18th governor of Nebraska from 1917 to 1919. The building was acquired by the North Platte Community Playhouse in 1980. It has been listed on the National Register of Historic Places since May 9, 1985.
