= Mary Reed House =

Historic house in Omaha, Nebraska

- Location: 503 South 36th Street, Omaha, Nebraska
- Coordinates: 41.25582121877731°N 95.9658423663408°W
- Built: 1909
- Architectural style(s): Prairie School

Omaha Landmark
- Designated: March 16, 1982

The Mary Reed House is a historic house in the Gold Coast area of Omaha, Nebraska. The house is a designated Omaha Historical Landmark, designed by notable architect F. A. Henninger in the Prairie style, and built in 1909.

== Attributes and history ==
The home was built and designed in 1909 for the widow of philanthropist and real estate pioneer Byron Reed.

On March 16, 1982, the Omaha City Council designated the house a local landmark.

This red-brick building has been home to a law firm since at least 1998. It was designed by architect F. A. Henninger in the Prairie style made famous by Frank Lloyd Wright. It was designated as an Omaha Historical Landmark in 1982.
