= North Platte U.S. Post Office and Federal Building =

- U.S. National Register of Historic Places
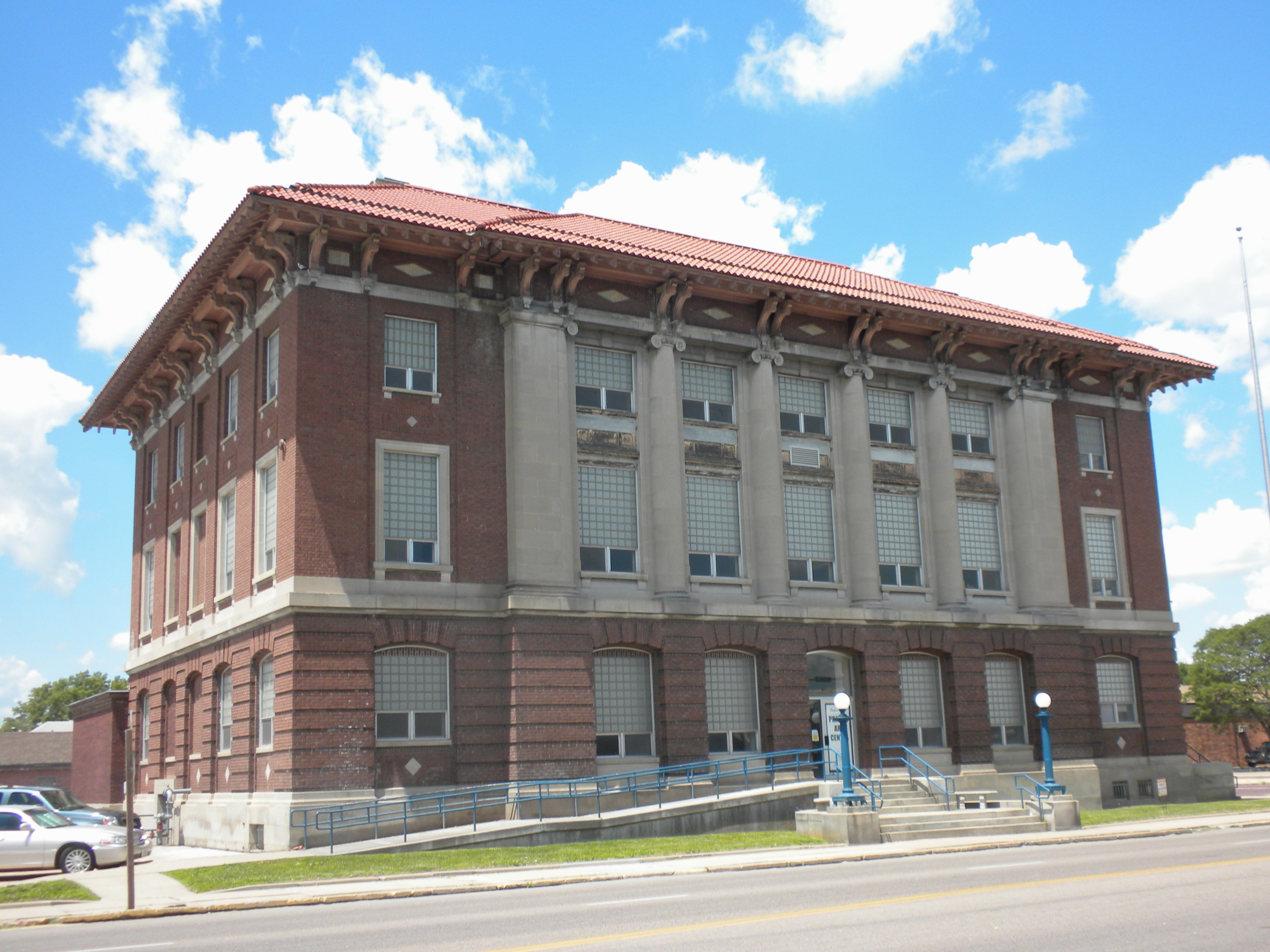
- The building in 2010

- Location within Nebraska Location within the United States
- Location: 416 North Jeffers Street, North Platte, Nebraska
- Coordinates: 41°08′14″N 100°45′47″W
- Area: 0.4 acres (0.16 ha)
- Built: 1913
- Architect: James Knox Taylor
- Architectural style: Renaissance Revival
- NRHP reference No.: 09000071
- Added to NRHP: March 4, 2009

The North Platte U.S. Post Office and Federal Building is a historic three-story building in North Platte, Nebraska. It was built in 1913, and designed in the Renaissance Revival style by architect James Knox Taylor. Its front facade has a central entrance under a brick segmented arch.

The post office was relocated in 1964 when a new Federal building was constructed, and the building was then to be used by a community college. It has been listed on the National Register of Historic Places since March 4, 2009.
