= F. A. Henninger =

American architect

Frederick A. Henninger (1865–1944), commonly known as F. A. Henninger, was an American architect. He was born in 1865 at Albia, Iowa, and attended the Chicago Art Institute. He moved from Chicago to Lincoln, Nebraska, and in 1891 to Omaha, Nebraska. He worked as a draftsman for an architect in 1895 and purchased the practice in 1896. He worked as an architect in Omaha until his retirement in 1937. After retiring, he moved to Pasadena, California and died there in 1944.

A number of his works are listed on the National Register of Historic Places.

Works include:

Name	Image	Date	Address	More
Druid Hill School		1917	3030 Spaulding Street, Omaha, Nebraska	Part of Omaha Public Schools, this building has received any designations or protections.
Otto H. Barmettler House		1916	622 N. 38th Street, Omaha, Nebraska	Part of the NRHP-listed Gold Coast Historic District
Calvin Memorial Presbyterian Church, also known as North Presbyterian Church		-	3105 N. 24th Street, Omaha, Nebraska	NRHP-listed
Dairy Building for Omaha's Trans-Mississippi Exposition		1898	Omaha, Nebraska	-
Dundee-Happy Hollow Historic District		-	Omaha, Nebraska	The district includes 30 known works by Henninger, including structures on Jones Street (Nos. 5173, 5177, 5213), Farnam Street (Nos. 4838, 4814), Nicholas Street (5104 and 5404), Underwood Avenue (Nos. 5202 and 5206), Western Avenue (Nos. 5020, 5121 and 5209), North 53rd Street (Nos. 120, 124, 530, 544), North 54th Street (Nos. 105, 109, 110, 301, 302), North 57th Avenue (Nos. 662 and 659), 302 South 51st Avenue, 102 North 52nd Street, 322 South 51st Street, 514 South 52nd Street, 544 South 53rd Street, 105 North 55th Street, 666 North 56th Street, 675 North 57th Street, 123 North Happy Hollow Boulevard, 5110 Chicago Street, 5215 California Street, 4814 Cass Street, 5111 Cuming Street, 5173 Jones Street, 5022 Webster Street
Elmwood Park Pavilion		-	802 South 60th Street, Omaha, Nebraska	-
Farm Credit Building		1934	19th and Douglas Streets, Omaha, Nebraska	NRHP-listed
Fox Theatre		-	301 E. 5th, North Platte, Nebraska	NRHP-listed
Harder Hotel		1901	503 Main St. Scribner, Nebraska	NRHP-listed
Havens-Page House		1900	101 N. 39th St., Omaha, Nebraska	NRHP-listed
Hotel Yancey		-	221 E. 5th St., North Platte, Nebraska	NRHP-listed
Jewell Building		1923	2221-2225 N. 24th St., Omaha, Nebraska	NRHP-listed
The Margaret Apartments		1916	2103 N. 16th St., Omaha, Nebraska	NRHP-listed
Fred Metz, Jr., House		-	115 N. 53rd Street, Omaha, Nebraska	Part of the NRHP-listed Dundee-Happy Hollow Historic District
Edgar Morsman House		-	518 S. 38th Street, Omaha, Nebraska	Part of the NRHP-listed Gold Coast Historic District
Normandie Apartments		1898	1102 Park Ave., Omaha, Nebraska	NRHP-listed
Omaha Grain Exchange Building		-	19th and Harney Streets, Omaha, Nebraska	-
Lyman Perley House		-	207 Fairacres Road, Omaha, Nebraska	-
Porter-Thomsen House		-	3426 Lincoln Blvd., Omaha, Nebraska	NRHP-listed
Mary Reed House		1909	503 South 36th Street, Omaha, Nebraska	
Rose Realty-Securities Building		1916	305 S. 16th St., Omaha, Nebraska	NRHP-listed
Strehlow Terrace		-	2024 and 2107 N. Sixteenth St., Omaha, Nebraska	NRHP-listed
West Farnam Apartments		1912	3817 Dewey Avenue, Omaha, Nebraska	Part of the NRHP-listed Gold Coast Historic District
