= Harder Hotel =

Historic hotel building in Scribner, Nebraska, United States

- U.S. National Register of Historic Places
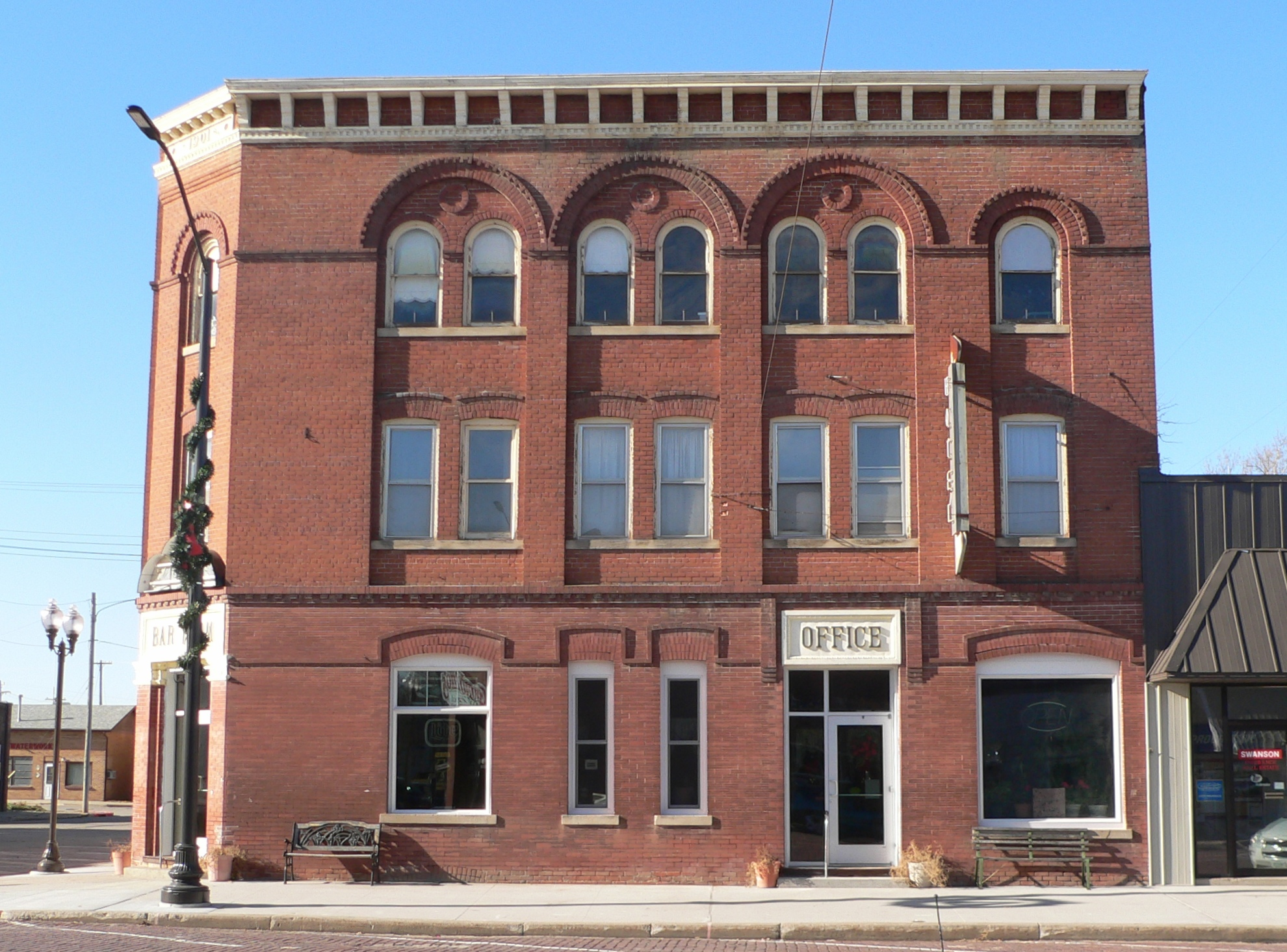
- The building in 2011

- Location within Nebraska Location within the United States
- Location: 503 Main Street, Scribner, Nebraska
- Coordinates: 41°40′00″N 96°39′57″W
- Area: less than one acre
- Built: 1901
- Built by: Fritz Stabenow
- Architect: Frederick A. Henninger
- Architectural style: Late Victorian, American Rundbogenstil
- NRHP reference No.: 89002046
- Added to NRHP: November 27, 1989

The Harder Hotel is a historic hotel building in Scribner, Nebraska. It was built in 1901 by Fritz Stabenow for Hans Harder, a German immigrant from Schleswig-Holstein who first worked as a stonemason in Chicago before moving to Nebraska. The building was designed in the Rundbogenstil style by architect Frederick A. Henninger. It has been listed on the National Register of Historic Places since November 27, 1989.
