= Hotel Yancey (North Platte, Nebraska) =

- U.S. National Register of Historic Places
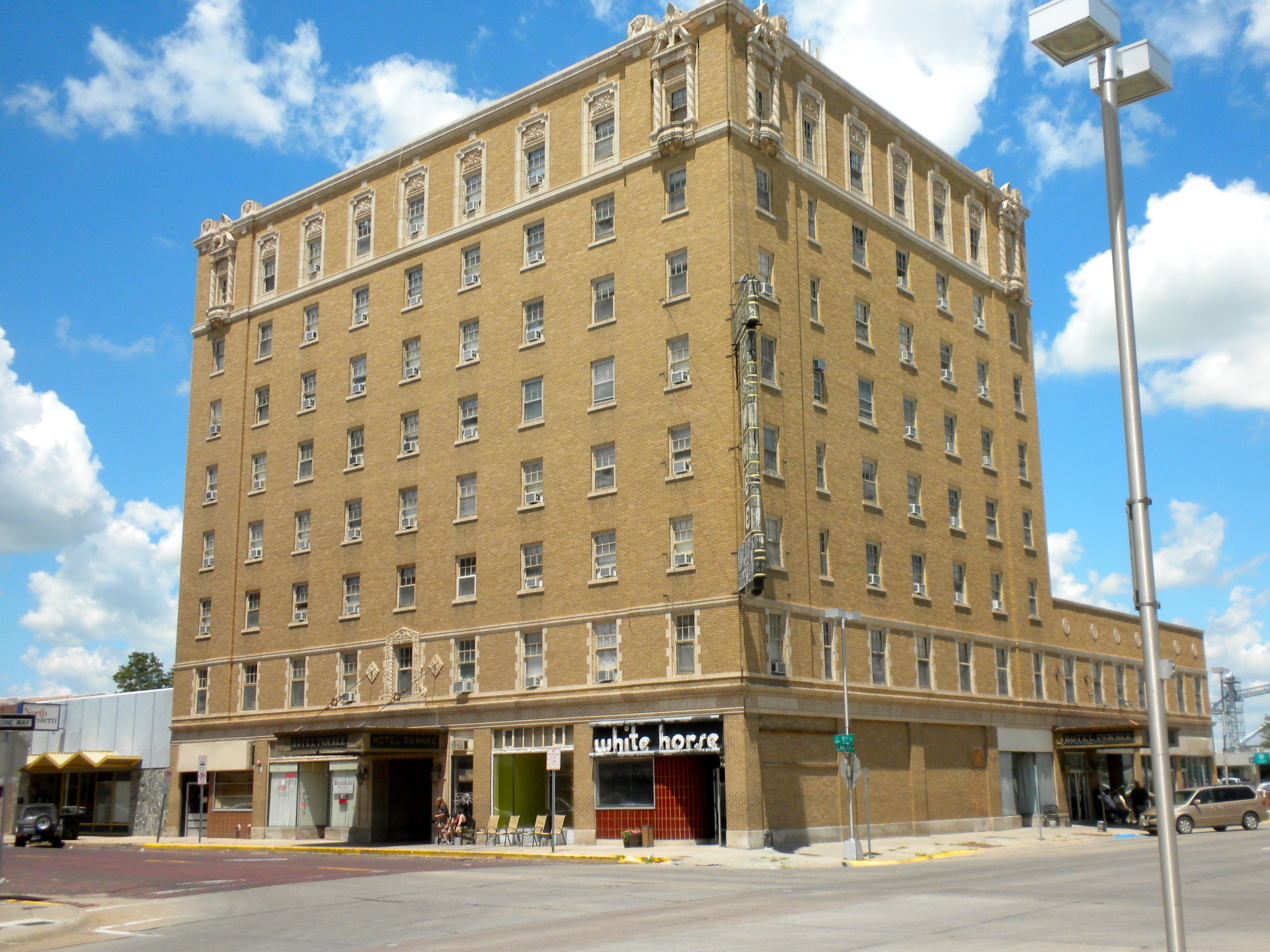
- The hotel in 2010

- Location within Nebraska Location within the United States
- Location: 221 East 5th Street, North Platte, Nebraska
- Coordinates: 41°08′15″N 100°45′37″W
- Area: less than one acre
- Built: 1929
- Built by: Alex Beck
- Architect: F.A. Henninger
- Architectural style: Colonial Revival, Georgian Revival
- NRHP reference No.: 85000956
- Added to NRHP: May 9, 1985

Hotel Yancey, also known as Hotel Pawnee, is a historic building in North Platte, Nebraska. It was built in 1929 by Alex Beck for the North Platte Realty Company, headed by Beck and Keith Neville, together with investor William Yancey, the owner of Hotel Yancey in Grand Island. Neville had served as the 18th governor of Nebraska from 1917 to 1919. The building was designed in the Colonial Revival and Georgian Revival styles by architect F.A. Henninger. It has been listed on the National Register of Historic Places since May 9, 1985.
