= Normandie Apartments =

- U.S. National Register of Historic Places
- Omaha Landmark
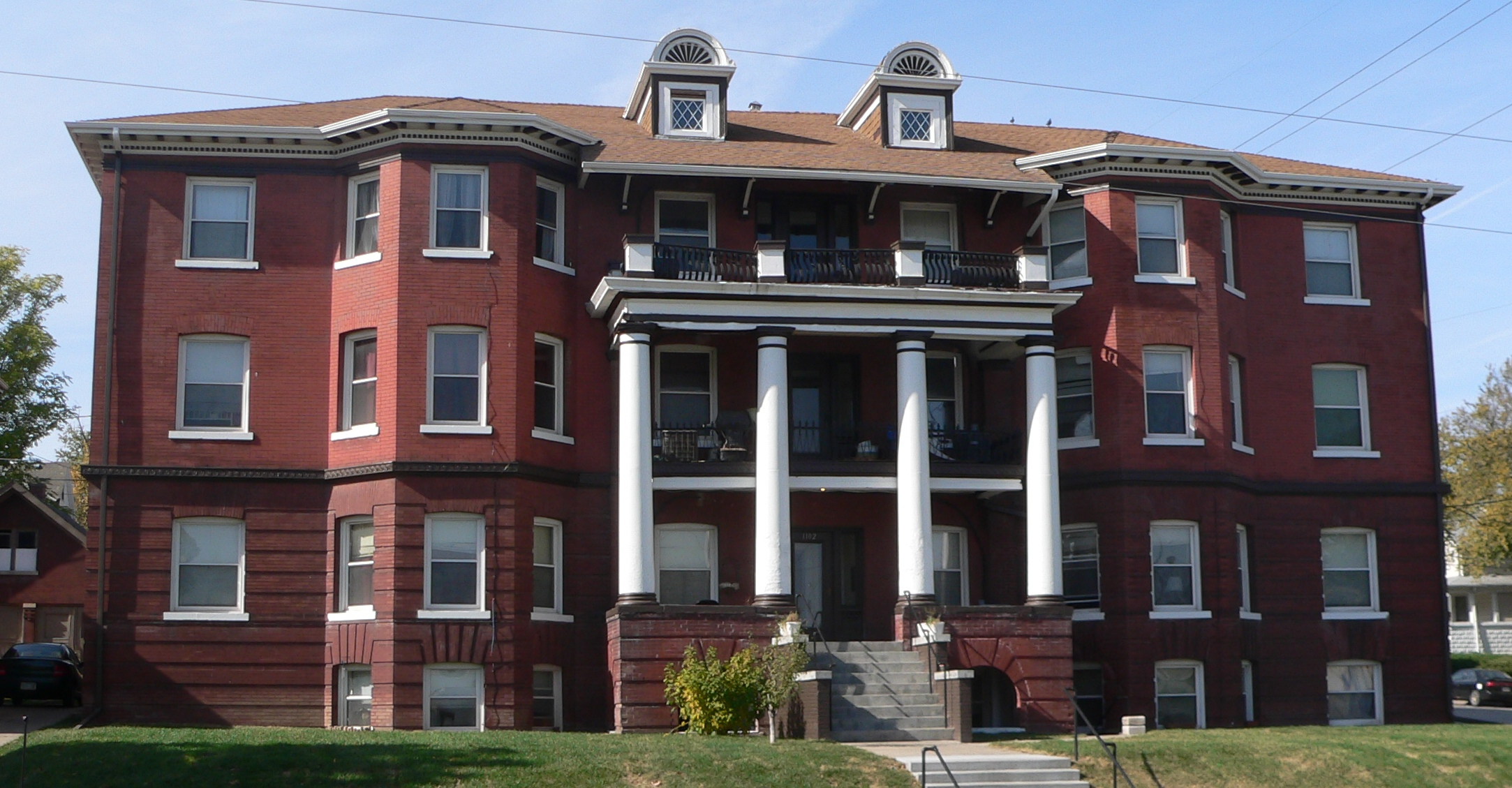
- Normandie Apartments, seen from the east

- Location within Nebraska Location within the United States
- Location: 1102 Park Avenue, Omaha, Nebraska
- Coordinates: 41°14′55″N 95°57′21″W
- Built: 1898
- Architect: Henninger, Frederick A.
- Architectural style: Late 19th and 20th Century Revivals
- NRHP reference No.: 91001758

Significant dates
- Added to NRHP: December 6, 1991
- Designated OMAL: March 17, 1992

The Normandie Apartments is a historic building located in the Near South Side neighborhood of Omaha, Nebraska, United States.

It was designed by architect Frederick A. Henninger.
