= The Margaret =

- U.S. National Register of Historic Places
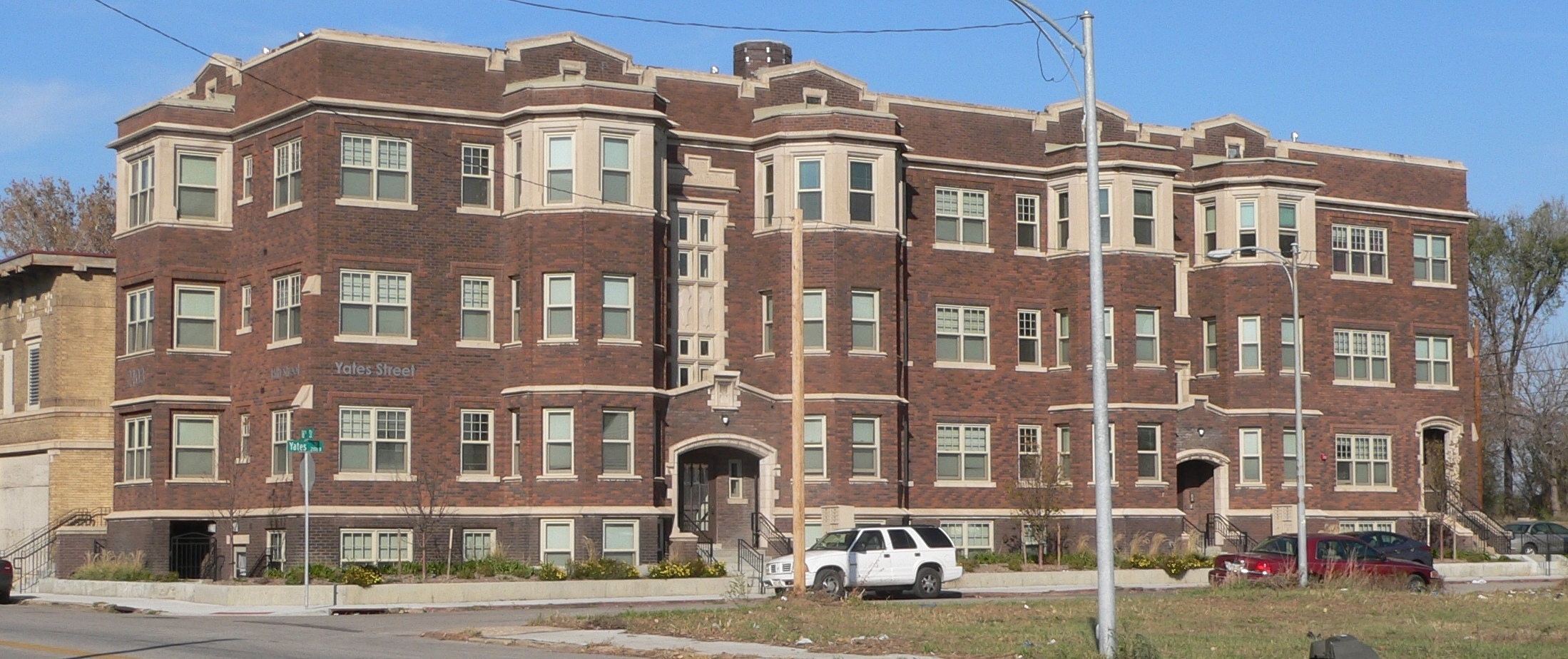

- Location within Nebraska Location within the United States
- Location: 2103 North 16th Street, Omaha, Nebraska
- Coordinates: 41°16′40.7″N 95°56′13.4″W
- Built: 1916
- Architect: F.A. Henninger; R.C. Strehlow
- Architectural style: Late 19th and 20th Century Revivals
- NRHP reference No.: 07000427
- Added to NRHP: May 15, 2007

The Margaret is a historic apartment building located in North Omaha, Nebraska. Built in 1916, it was added to the National Register of Historic Places in 2007.

Financed, built and owned by Omaha master builder Robert C. Strehlow, it was designed by F.A. Henninger. The Margaret was built at the same time as the Strehlow Terrace's building called the Roland. The Margaret was built for Strehlow's youngest child.
