= Havens–Page House =

Historic house in Nebraska, United States

- U.S. National Register of Historic Places
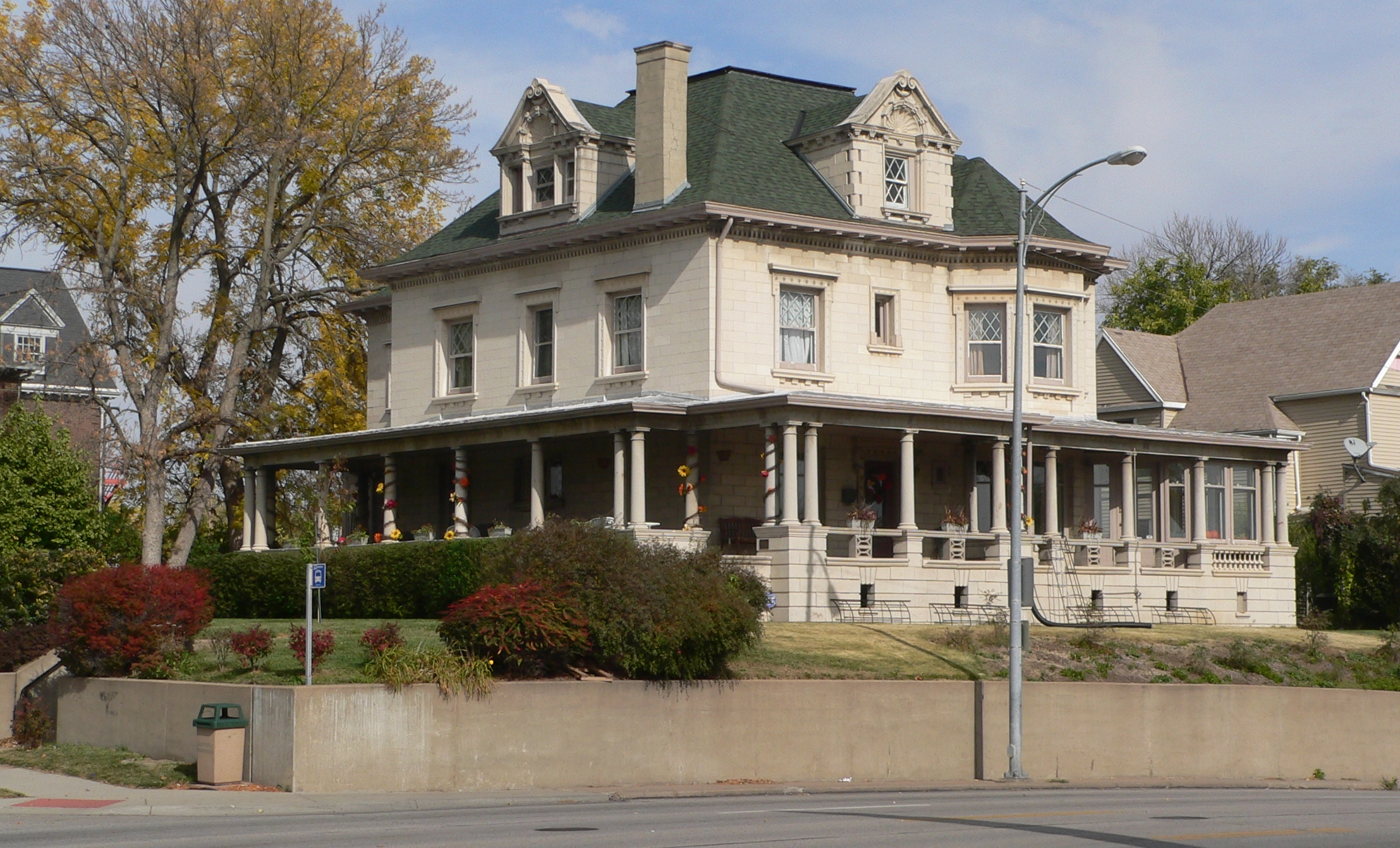
- View from 39th and Dodge, looking northeast

- Location within Nebraska Location within the United States
- Location: North Omaha, Nebraska
- Coordinates: 41.25988296568822°N 95.97153252618887°W
- Built: 1900
- Architect: F.A. Henninger
- Architectural style: Georgian Revival architecture
- NRHP reference No.: 82000604
- Added to NRHP: 1982

The Havens–Page House, also known as the T. C. Havens House, is a historic house built between 1900 and 1924 at 101 North 39th Street in the Gold Coast Historic District of Omaha, Nebraska. Listed on the National Register of Historic Places in 1982, this home is remarkable for its classical Georgian Revival architecture.

== About ==
Designed by architects F.A. Henninger and J. Harte, the Havens–Page House was completed between 1900 and 1924 for Thomas Collins Havens. It is built of stone in the Second Renaissance Revival Style. Located just south of the West Central–Cathedral Historic District and the George Joslyn House, it is within a North Omaha neighborhood referred to as the Gold Coast. When it was first built, the house was a trolley car ride away from the bustle of Omaha's downtown; today, it is located in the middle of the city.

The house was rehabilitated in 1983 in conjunction with a City of Omaha program for $50,000. It was designated an Omaha landmark on November 24, 1981, and listed on the National Register of Historic Places in 1982.

== See also ==
- Landmarks in North Omaha, Nebraska
