= Historic houses in Santa Rita, Pampanga =

The following lists down historic houses in the municipality of Santa Rita, Pampanga, Philippines.

One of such houses is the Guanzon Ancestral House, or commonly referred to as Villa Epifania. Dubbed as the "Grand Old House of Santa Rita", Villa Epifania has been receiving attention due to alleged supernatural occurrences happening inside it.

== List of historic houses in Santa Rita, Pampanga ==
Name	Date of Construction	Location	Coordinates	Image
Carpio Ancestral House		338 Carlos Mariano Street, Brgy. San Jose	14°59′57″N 120°37′04″E	
Dominican Convent, also known as Convento de la Sagrada Familia		Along Santa Rita - Porac Road, Brgy. San Matias	14°59′57″N 120°36′44″E	
Guanzon Ancestral House, also known as Villa Epifania	1932	429 Ocampo Street, Brgy. San Jose	15°00′02″N 120°37′02″E	
Maglalang Ancestral House		425 Ocampo Street, Brgy. San Jose	15°00′00″N 120°37′01″E	
Pineda Ancestral House	1918	426 Ocampo Street, Brgy. San Jose	15°00′01″N 120°37′01″E	

=== Dominican Convent ===
Also known as the Convento de la Sagrada Familia, the Dominican Convent has hosted numerous retreats and spiritual recollections. Near the convent is a Spanish-era stone arch.

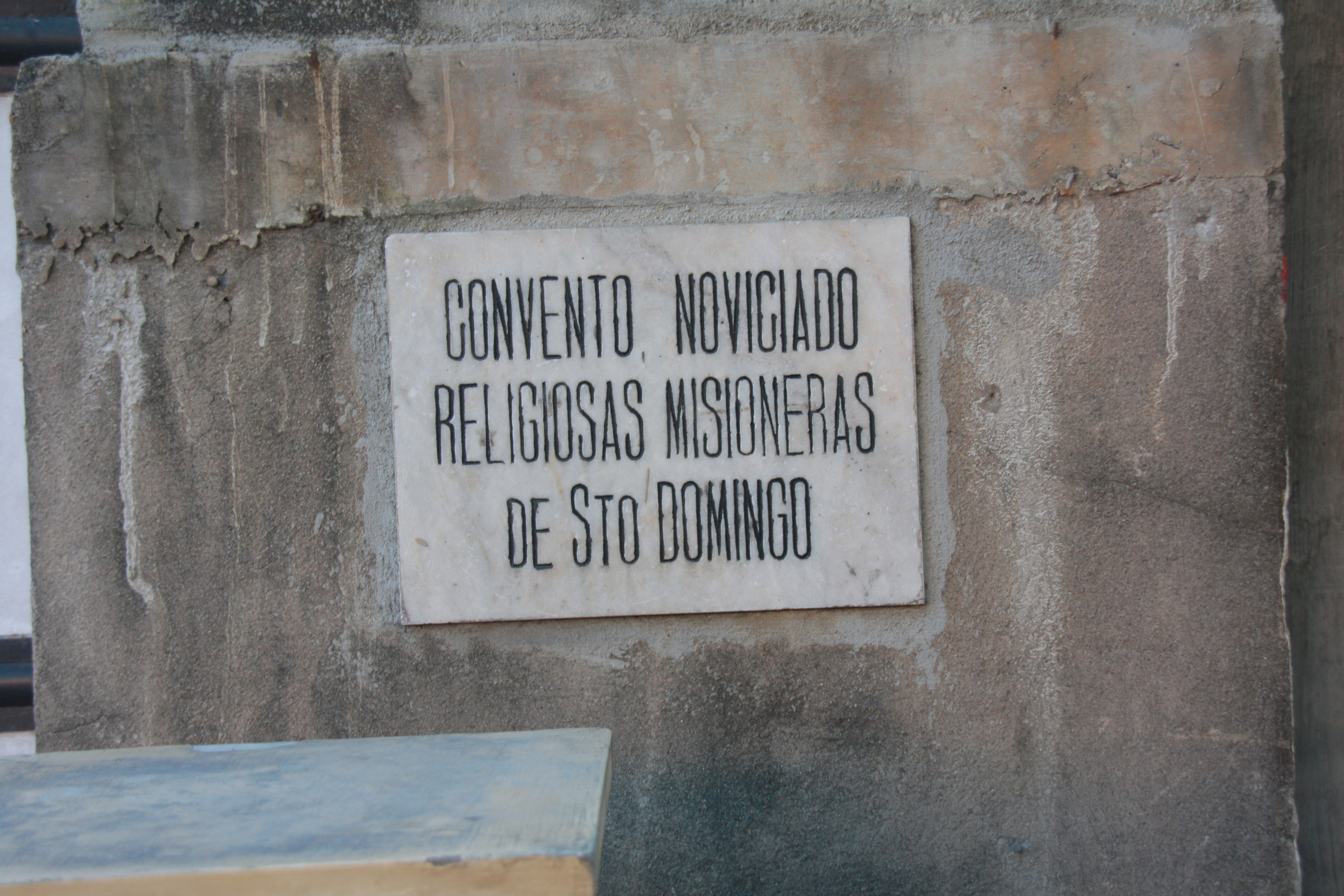
Marker

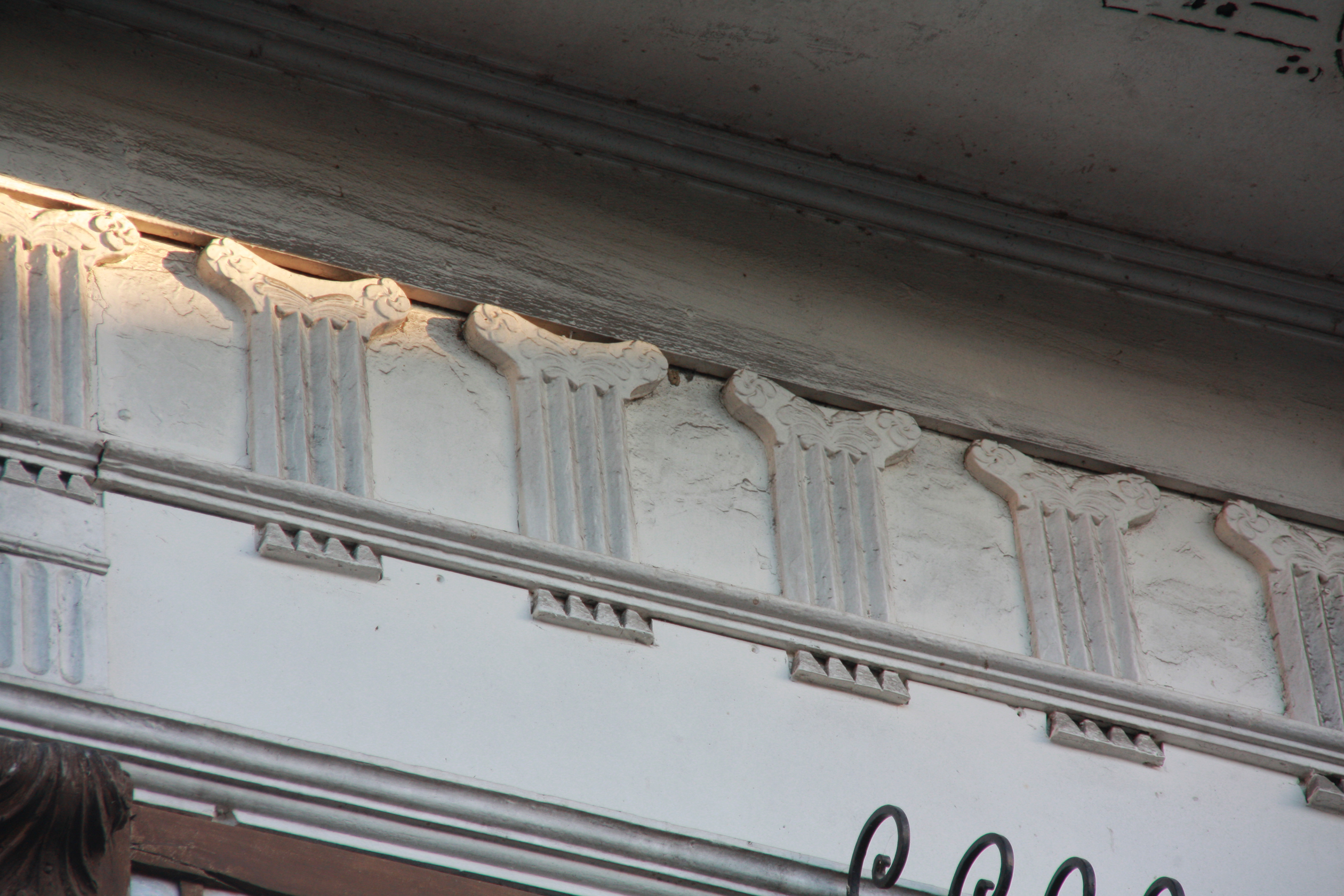
Triglyph decorations

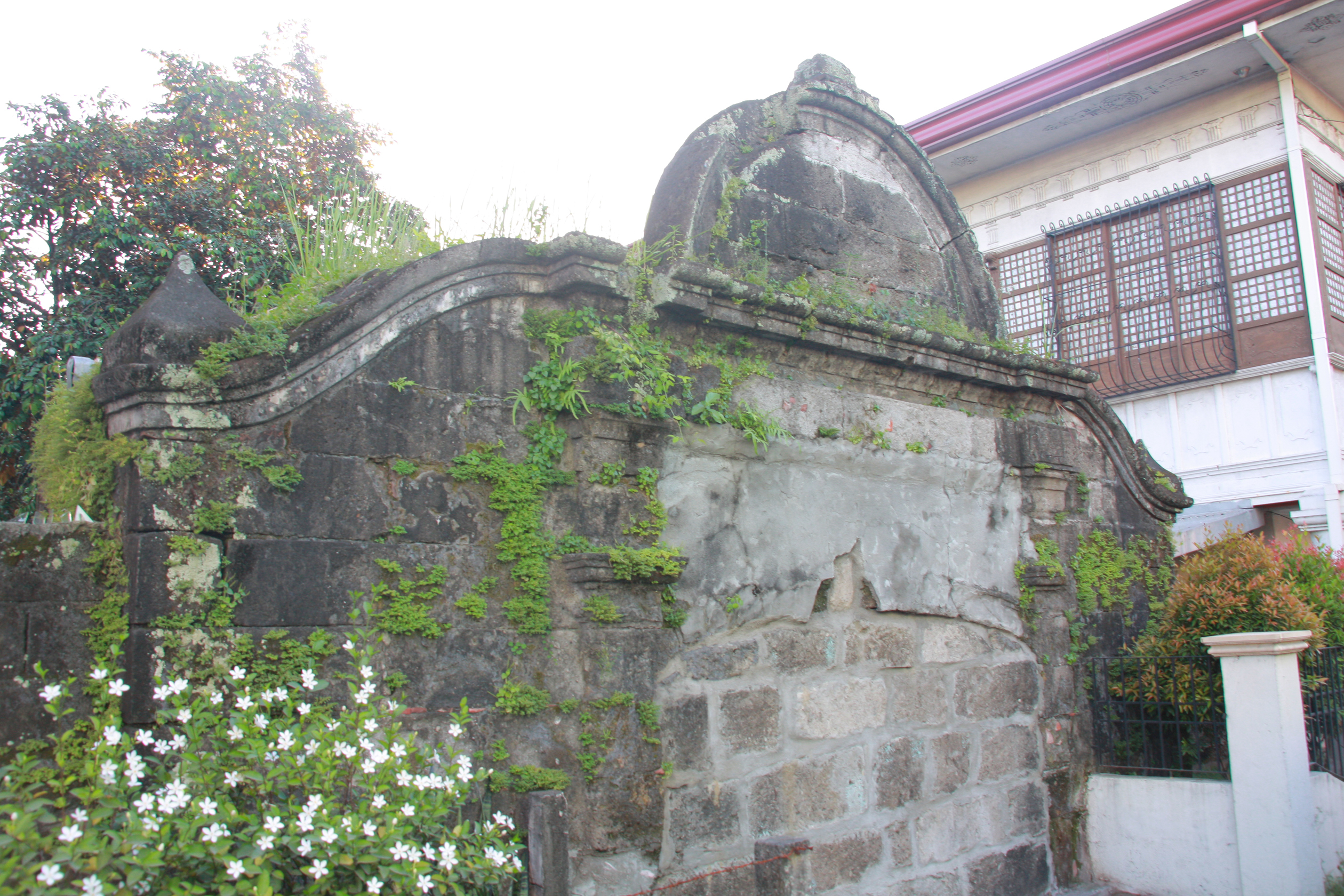
Stone arch

=== Guanzon Ancestral House ===
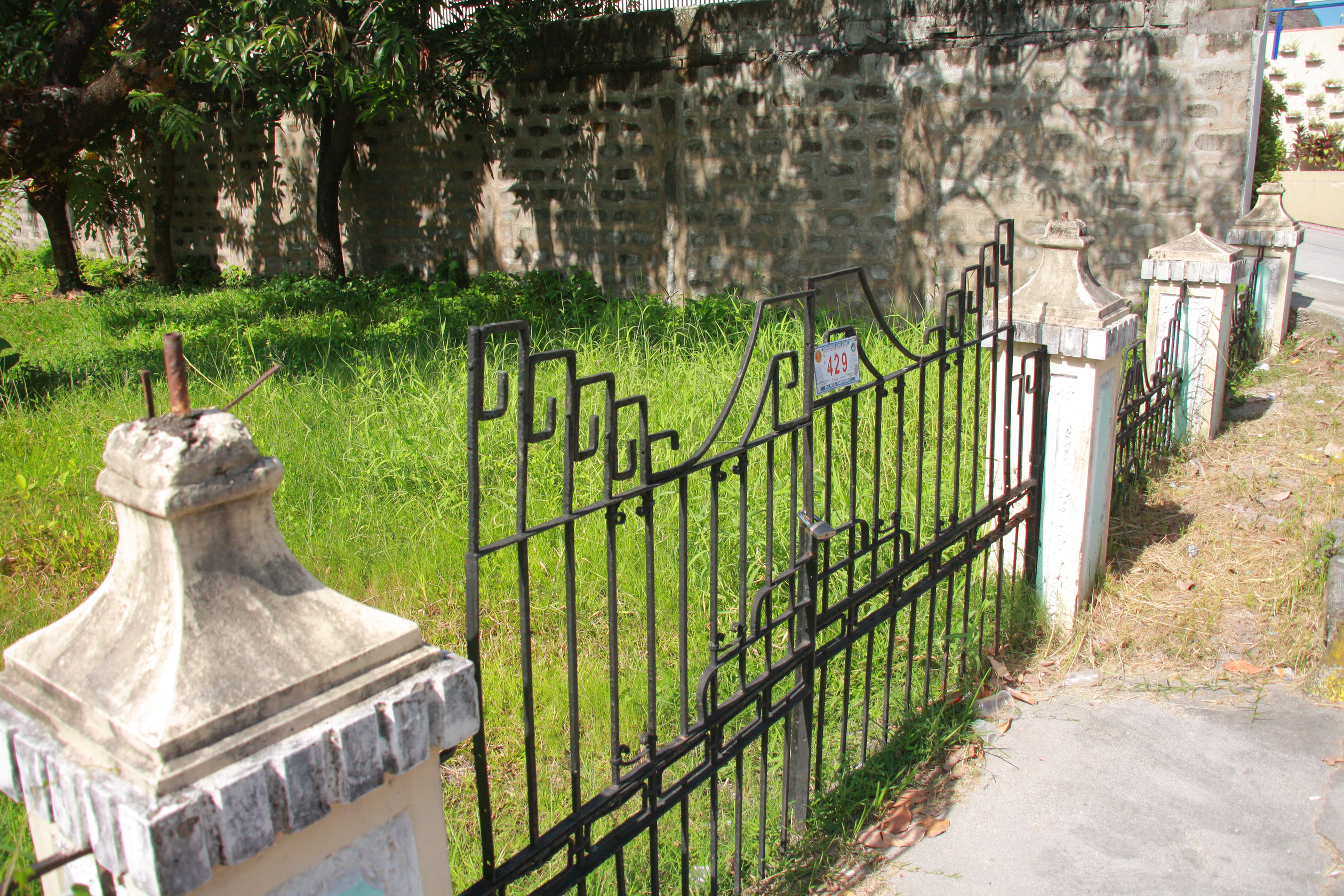
Metal gate and fence of Guanzon House

Constructed in the 1930s, the Villa Epifania was named after Dona Epifania from the Alvendias clan, an affluent clan from Floridablanca, Pampanga. The ancestral lot was owned by the Guanzon patriarch Don Agapito Guanzon (Captain Pitong), then the Capitan Municipal of Santa Rita. Capitan Pitong's son, Don Olympio Guanzon (former Pampanga Governor) would later inherit the lot and build an earlier old house in the same lot by 1925. The old house was later dismantled to give way for the villa and would later be passed on to Don Felipe Guanzon. The villa was designed and constructed by architect Mariano Pineda, a native of Santa Rita and relative of the Guanzons. Pineda would later join the Federal Architects of America. It was used as headquarters by the Japanese officers, USAFE guerillas and alcaldes during World War II.

Constructed between 1931 and 1932, the house was a standout among other houses during the period since it was the only all-concrete house in town. The entire house is made of concrete save for the upper wall on the western side of the house facing north, which showcases a gallery of windows. The main walls of the house are concrete, about a foot thick on all the major sidings. The concrete materials were imported from Guiguinto, Bulacan. The villa's wood portions are of the Philippine hardwood (narra, camagong and molave) and the furniture is of King Louis style. The furniture was acquired for the villa in 1931 and was bought from the Philippine Carnival in Manila and allegedly made by the prisoners of Bilibid prison. An azotea flanks the north side of the house which gives a view of the western farm lands in Santa Rita, a large portion of which were once owned by the Guanzons and other notable landlords from the Pineda, Lansang and Gosioco families. The doors of the former house that stood are now on the second floor of the house. The doors and windows are made of colored glass with hues of green and orange. A porte-cochere with granite staircase is the main feature of the facade and above it is a grand veranda with baroque pillars. Another small porch is located at the second floor near the grand veranda. The interiors of the house is of similar design. The villa also features other verandas at the second floor and a minor rooftop and chimneys for the kitchen. The construction of the entire house reportedly costs 90,000 pesos, a relatively large sum during its era. In popular media, the house was first featured in the Lino Brocka film Tinimbang Ka Ngunit Kulang in 1976. Later in the 1990s it was used as the backdrop for the movie Tanging Yaman.

=== Pineda Ancestral House ===
Construction of the Pineda House started on April 7, 1917, and was completed on January 10, 1918. The house is said to house images of saint carved by prolific 19th to 20th-century sculptor of religious images, Maximo Vicente. The lot of the house hosts the Santa Rita Catholic School.

==== Pineda House Image Gallery ====
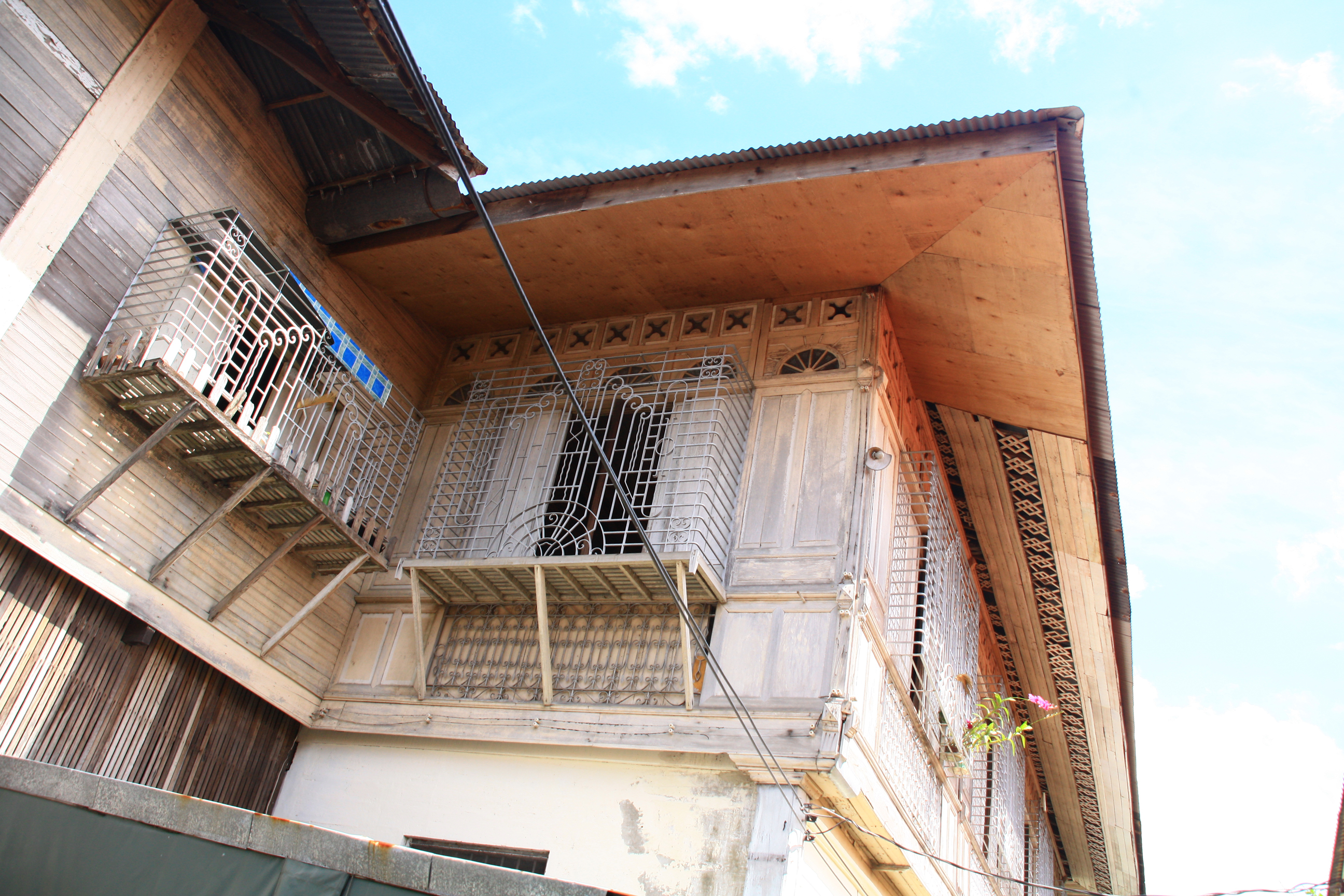
Back portion of the house

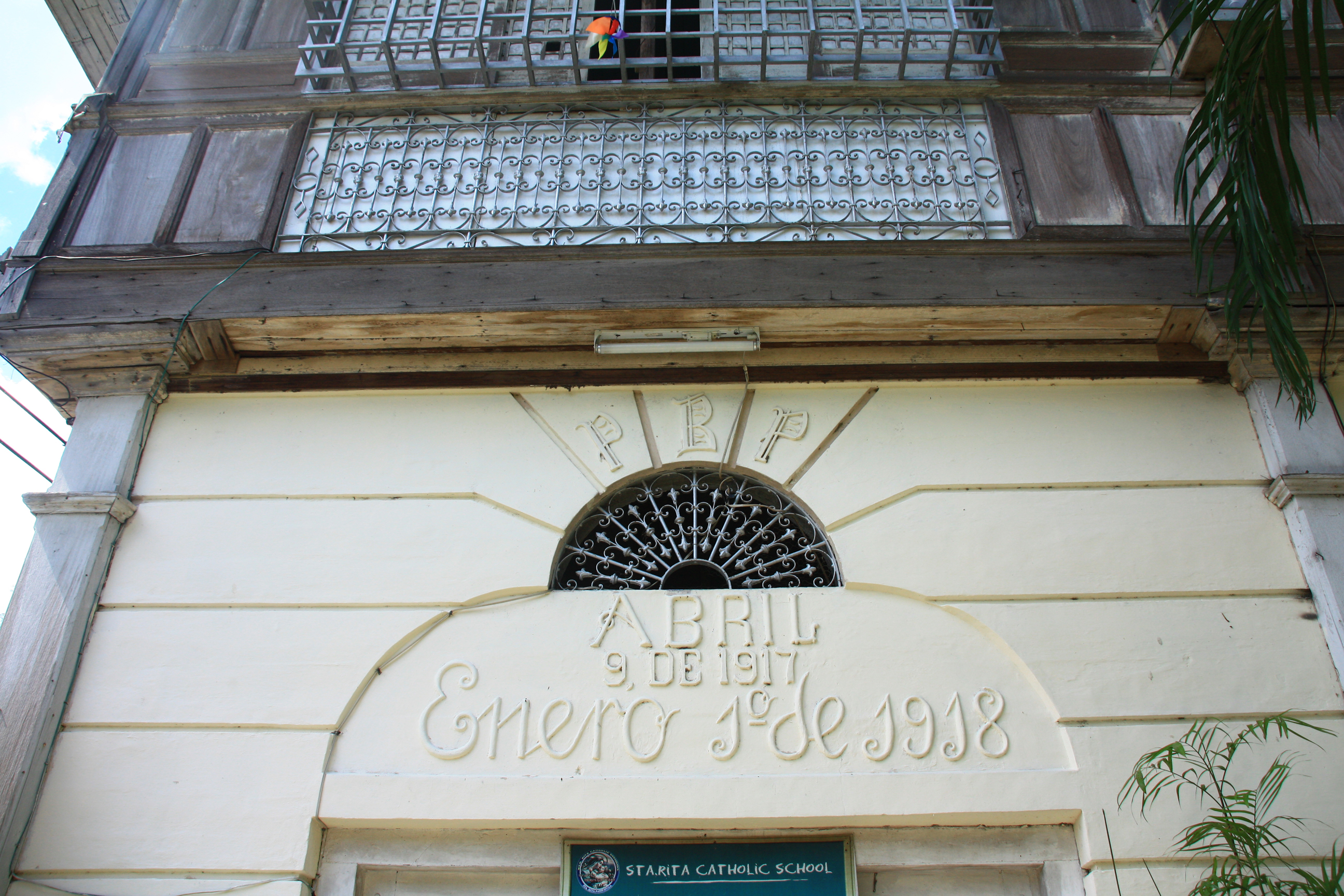
Inscription of date of construction and initials of owner

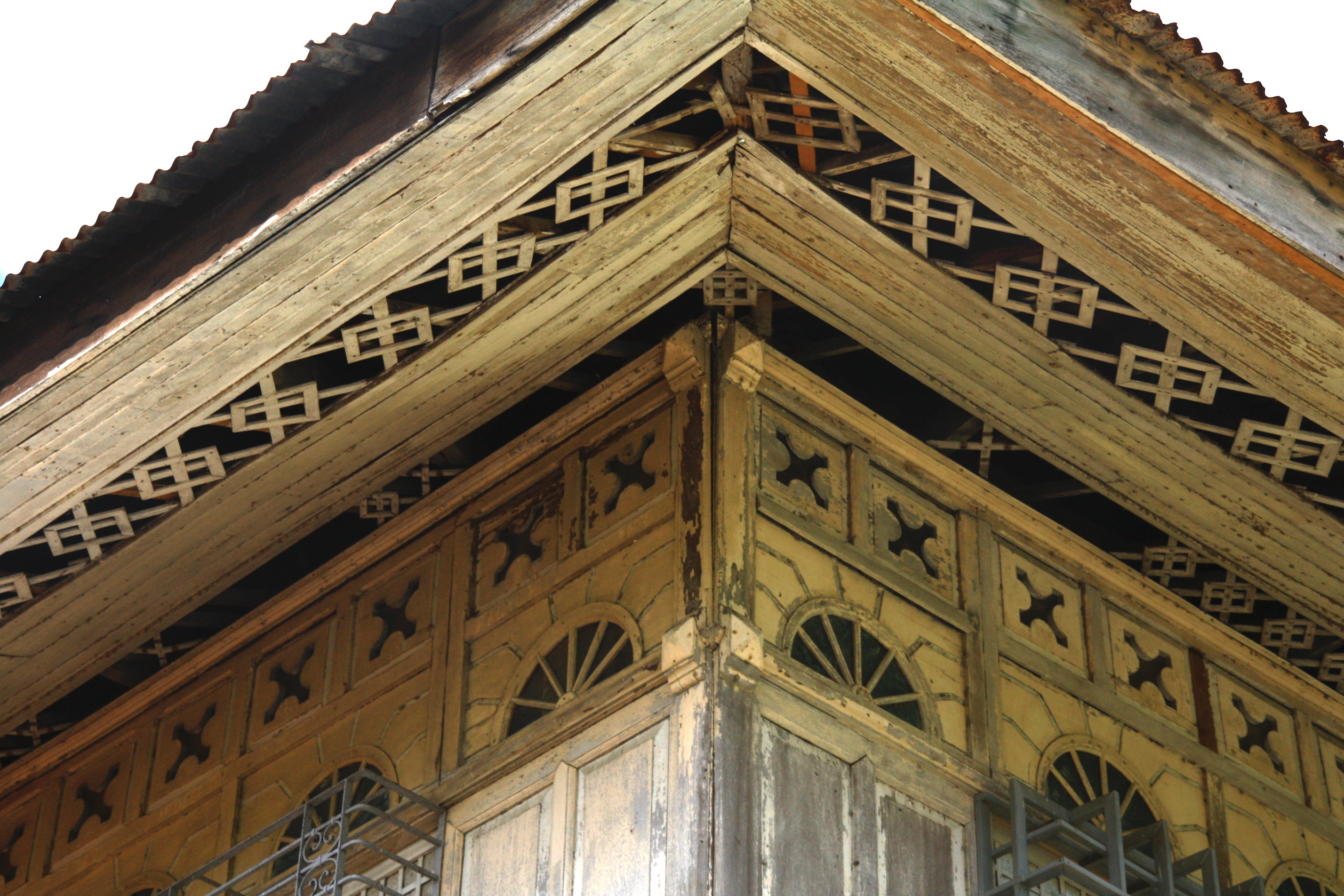
Details of the roof

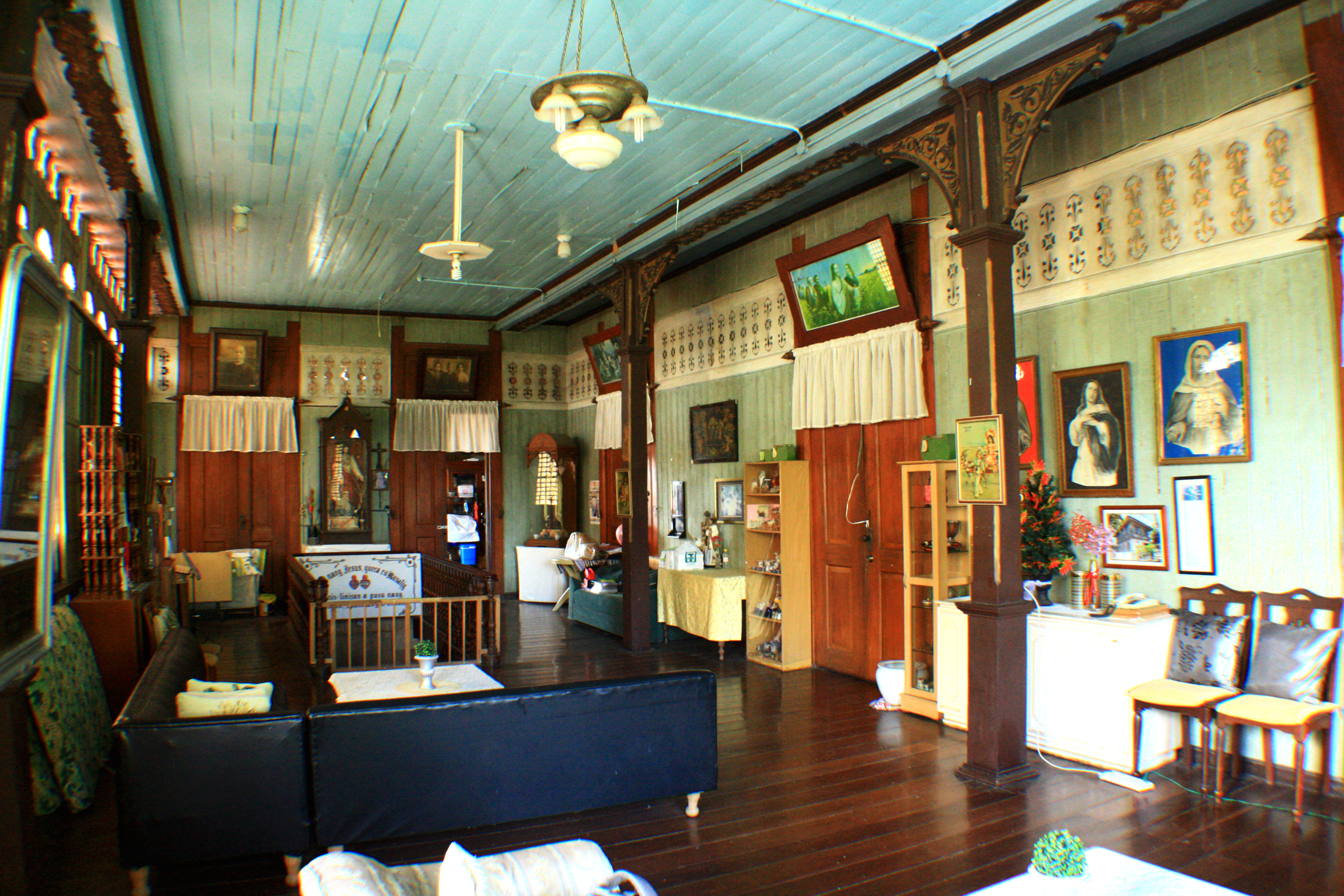
Interior (second floor)

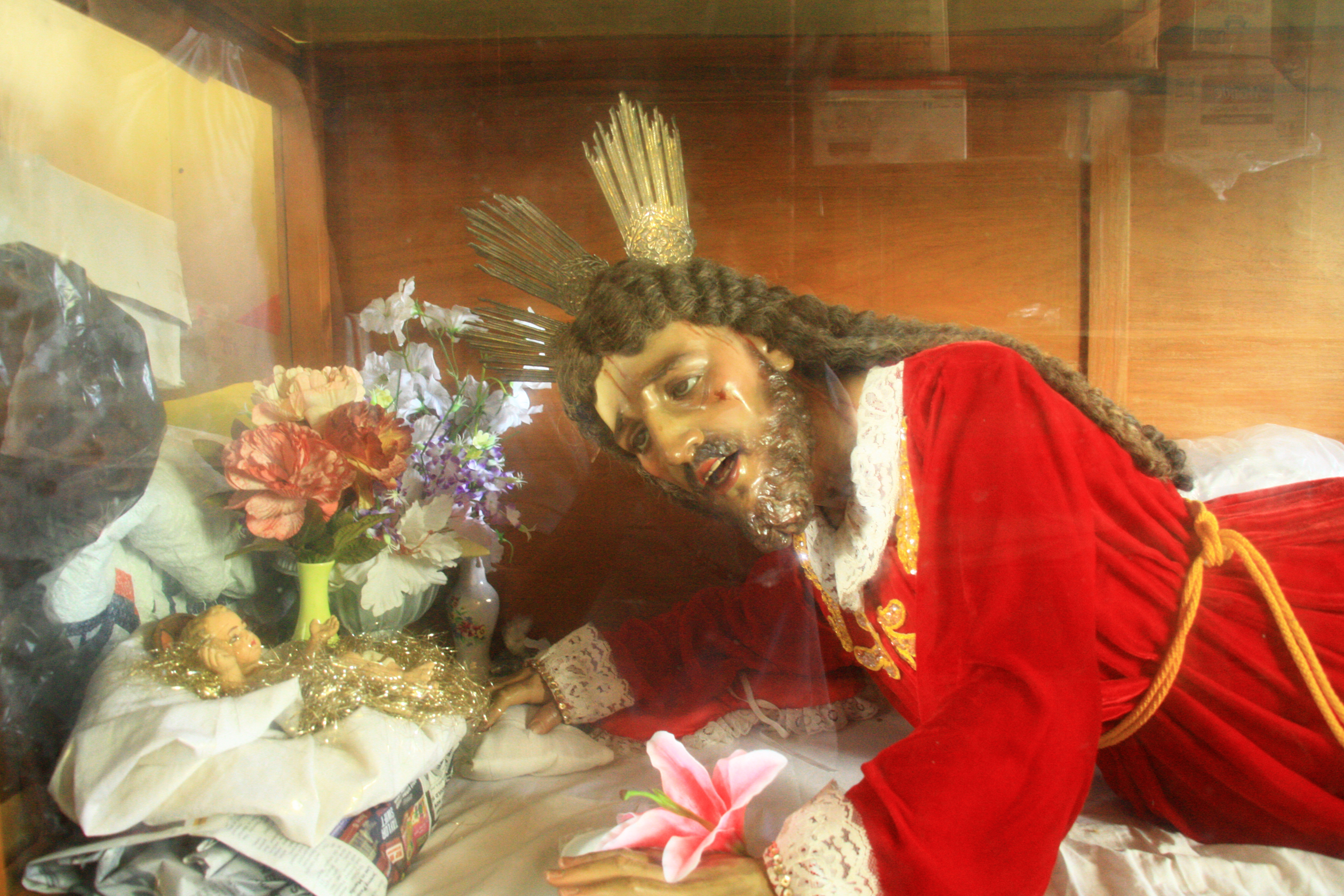
Sculpture by Maximo Vicente

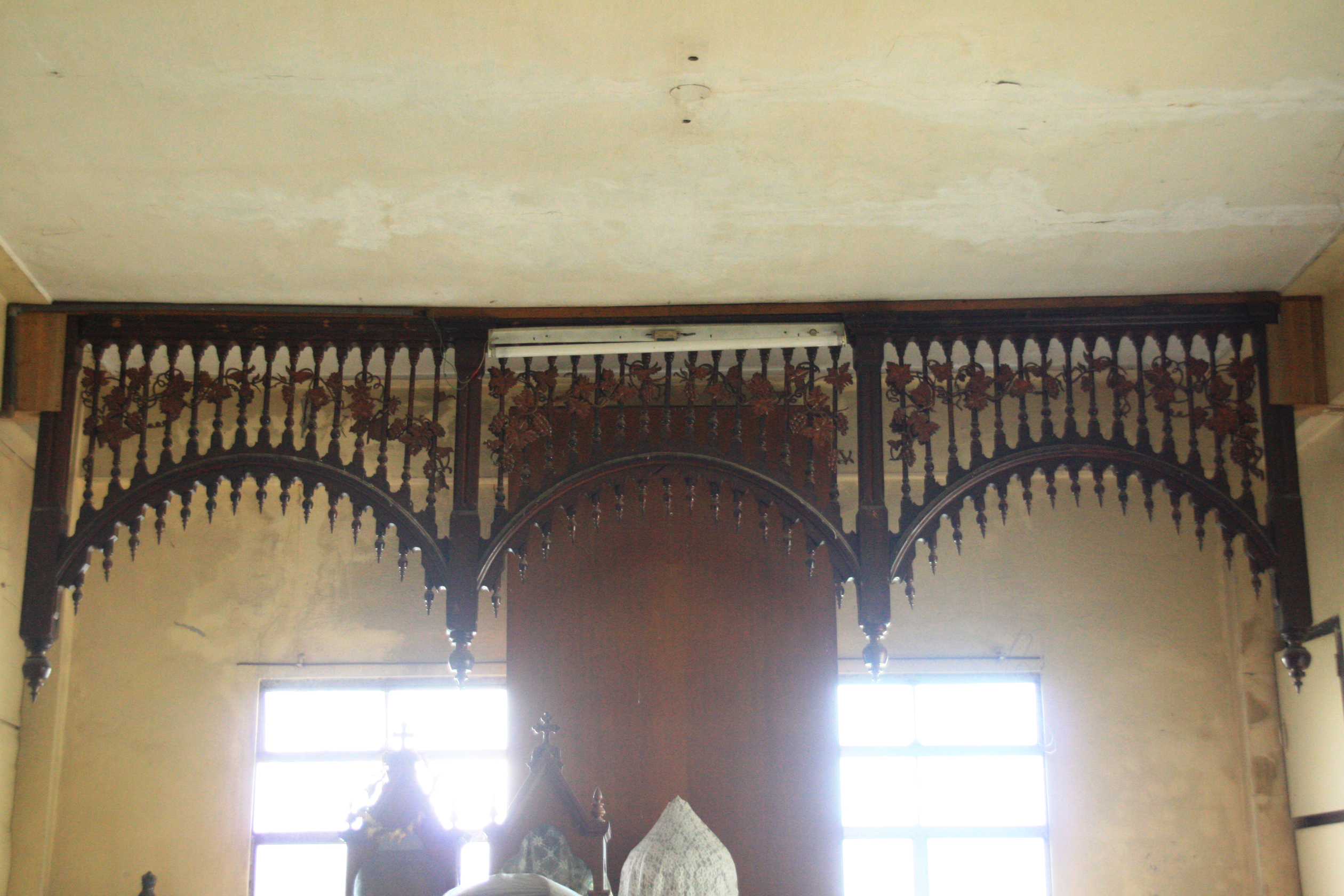
Calado woodwork

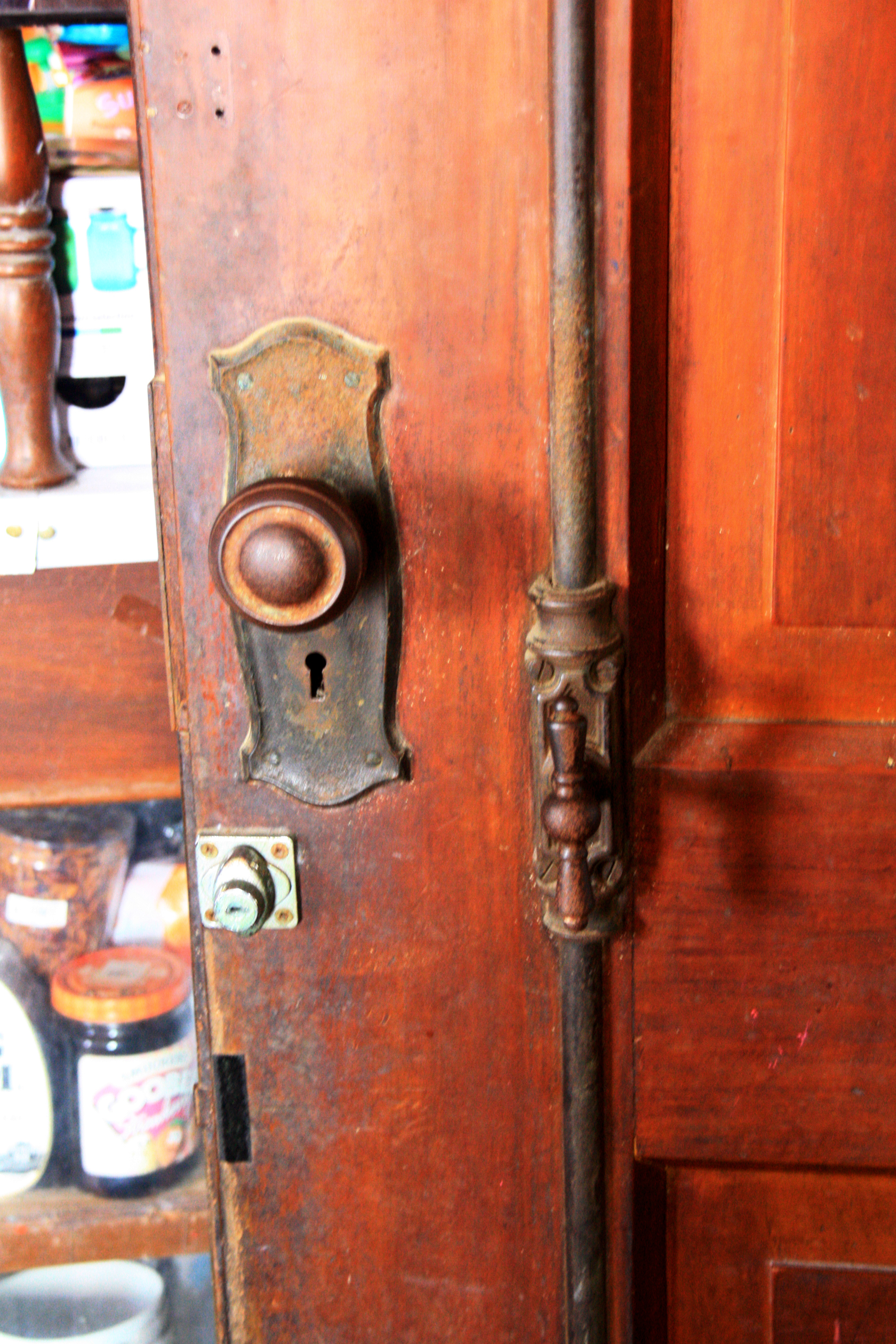
Old door knob and door lock

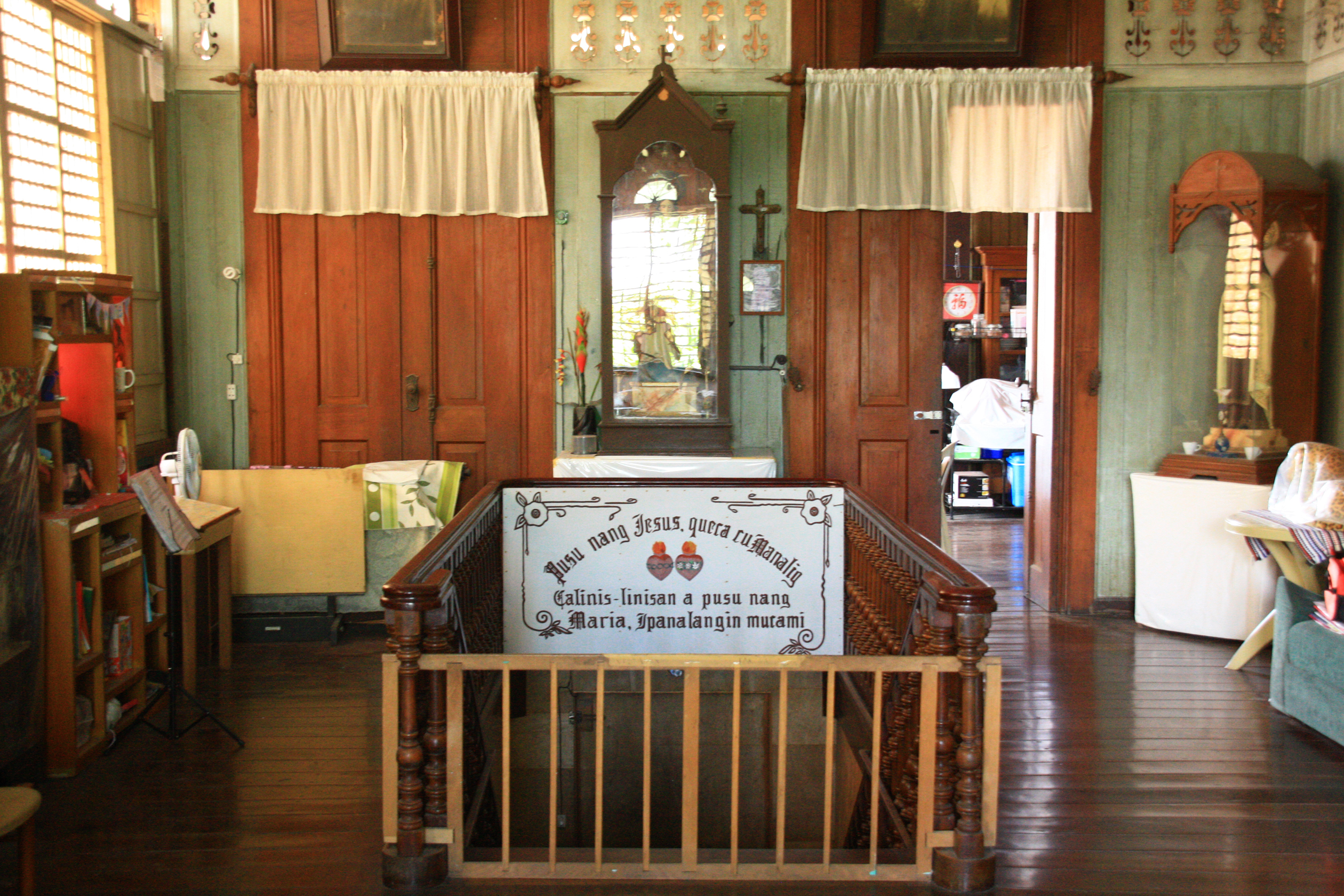
Staircase

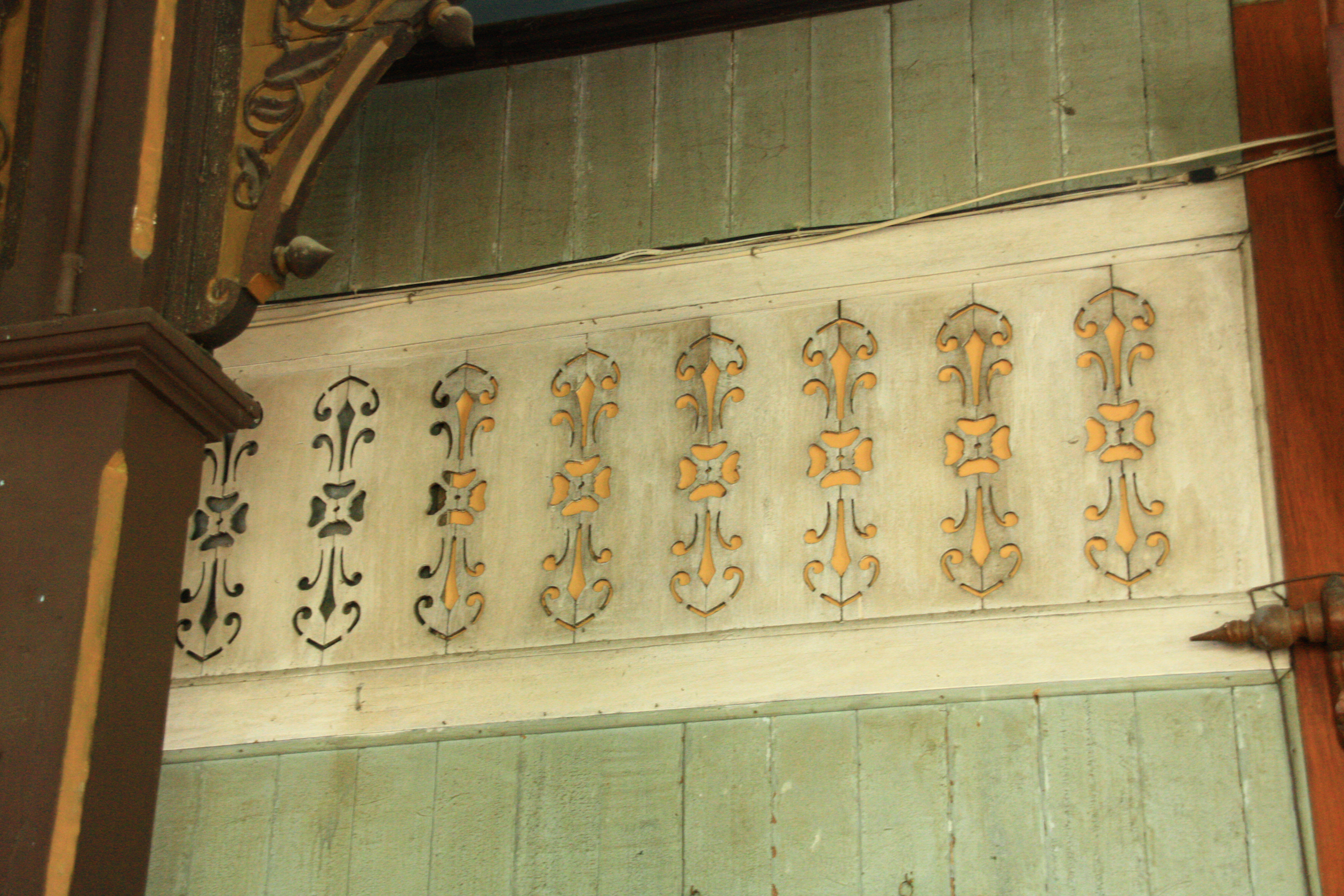
Calado woodwork for ventilation

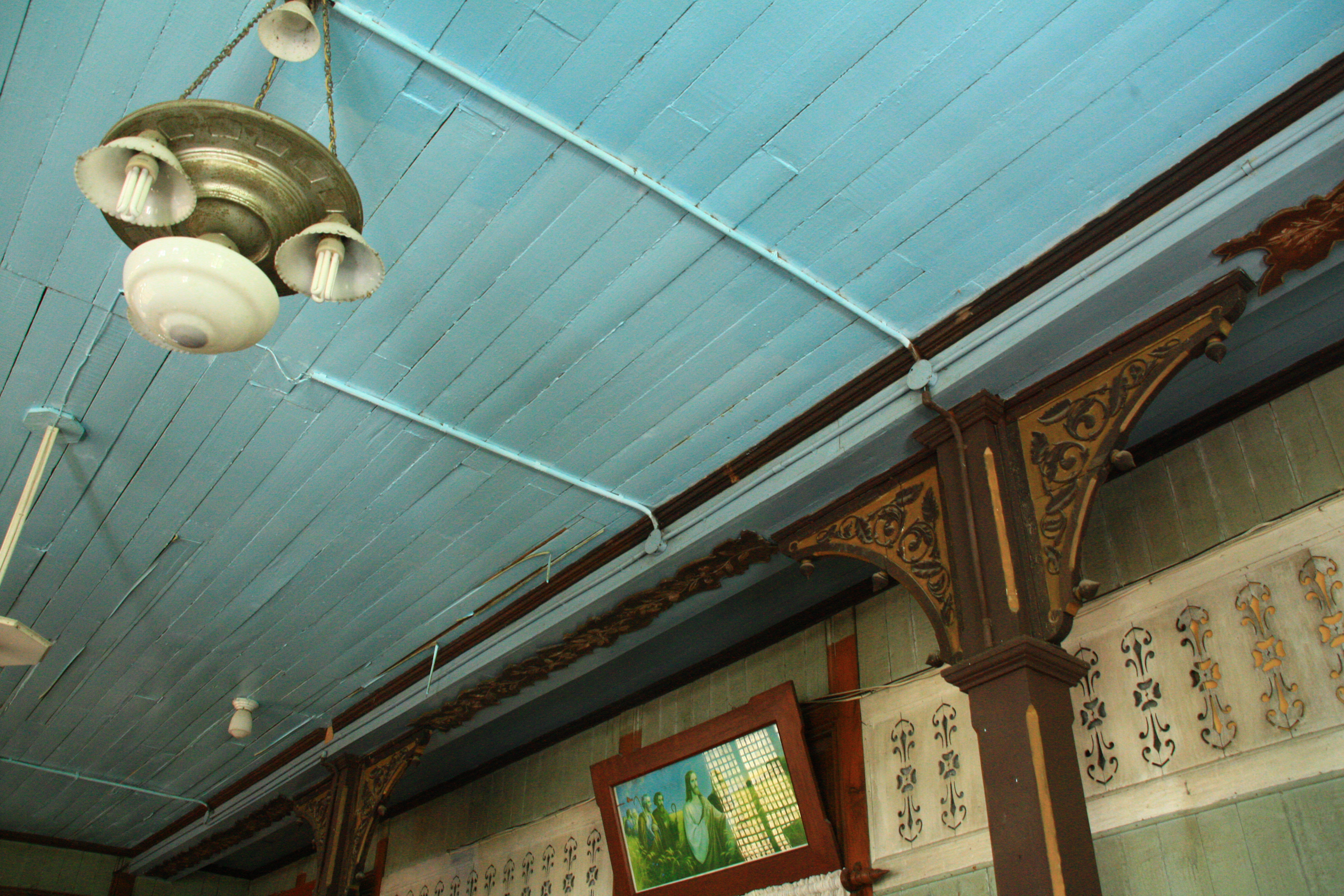
Ceiling with old chandelier and decorative brackets
