= Strehlow Terrace =

- U.S. National Register of Historic Places
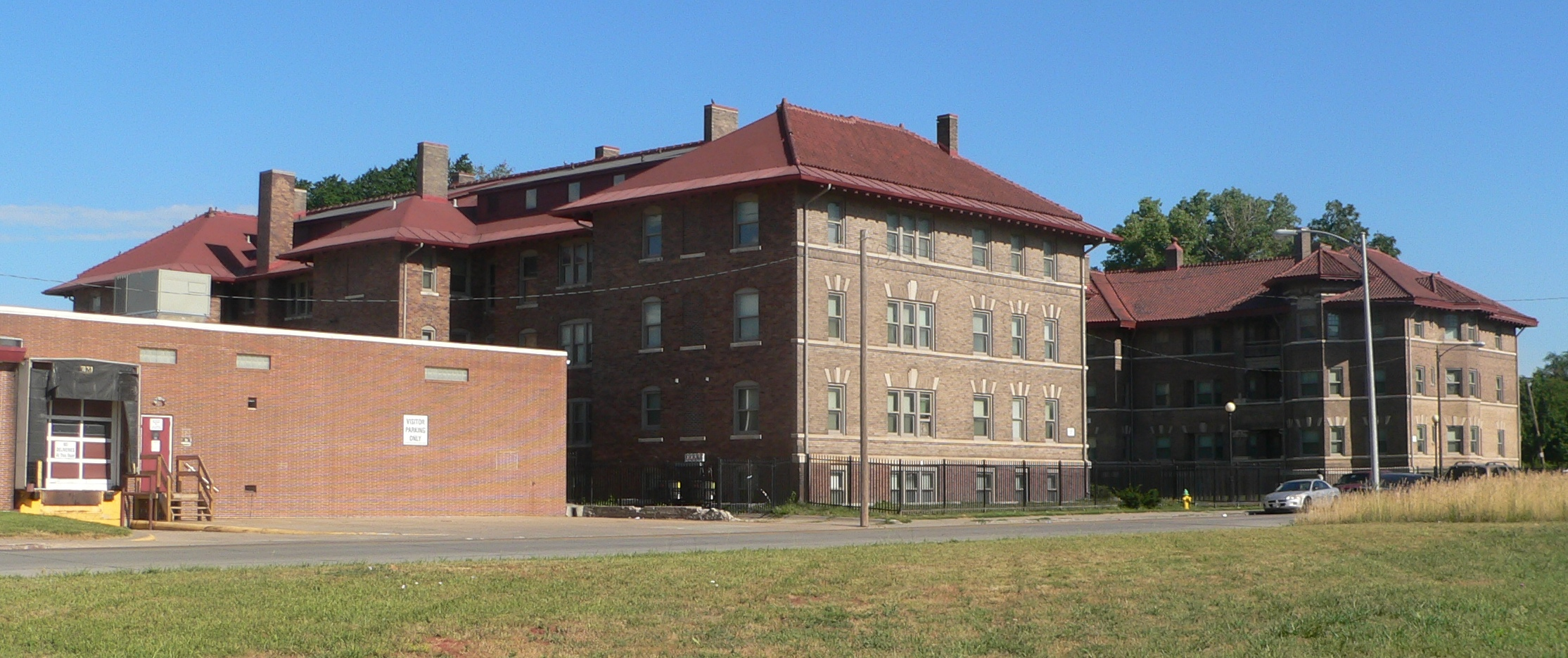
- View from the southeast

- Location within Nebraska Location within the United States
- Location: Omaha, NE
- Coordinates: 41°16′41.17″N 95°56′18.12″W
- Built: 1905
- Architect: Robert C. Strehlow, Frederick A. Henninger
- Architectural style: Classical Revival, Prairie School, Bungalow/craftsman
- NRHP reference No.: 86003446
- Added to NRHP: December 23, 1986

Strehlow Terrace, also called the Terrace Garden Apartment Complex and Ernie Chambers Court, is located at 2024 and 2107 North Sixteenth Street in the Near North Side neighborhood of North Omaha, Nebraska. Designed by Robert Strehlow and reputed local architect Frederick Henninger, Strehlow was added to the National Register of Historic Places in 1986.

== History ==
Constructed between 1905 and 1916, the buildings were owned and erected by Omaha master builder Robert C. Strehlow. The six buildings that comprise the complex are designed in the Prairie School style. The complex includes the Majestic, the Strehlow, and the Roland, built in 1905, 1907, and 1909, respectively. There is also a one-story apartment, a two-story residence, and a garage/apartment, built between 1910 and 1920. According to the City of Omaha, the complex is the state's earliest known example of an integrated grouping of related apartment buildings. It is arranged around a central courtyard and includes a concrete fountain and benches.

Robert Strehlow, an Omaha-based builder, was a renowned builder during Omaha's 1898 Trans-Mississippi Exposition and the Panama-Pacific Exhibition in San Francisco in 1915. Strehlow developed his apartment complex during that period, incorporating aspects of turn-of-the-century design, including an axial court arrangement, a sculptured fountain, and landscaped grounds.

The Strehlow House, recreation center and The Roland, all at Strehlow Terrace, were finished in the same year as another of Strehlow's buildings, The Margaret. However, The Margaret was completed with a different design, including red bricks instead of a distinctive tan.

== Redevelopment ==
Strehlow Terrace was redeveloped starting in 1996, and received continuous redevelopment throughout the 1990s. In 2005, it was renamed the Ernie Chambers Court in honor of Nebraska State Senator Ernie Chambers.

== See also ==
- History of North Omaha, Nebraska
- Architecture of North Omaha, Nebraska
