= Wallace, Nebraska =

- Village
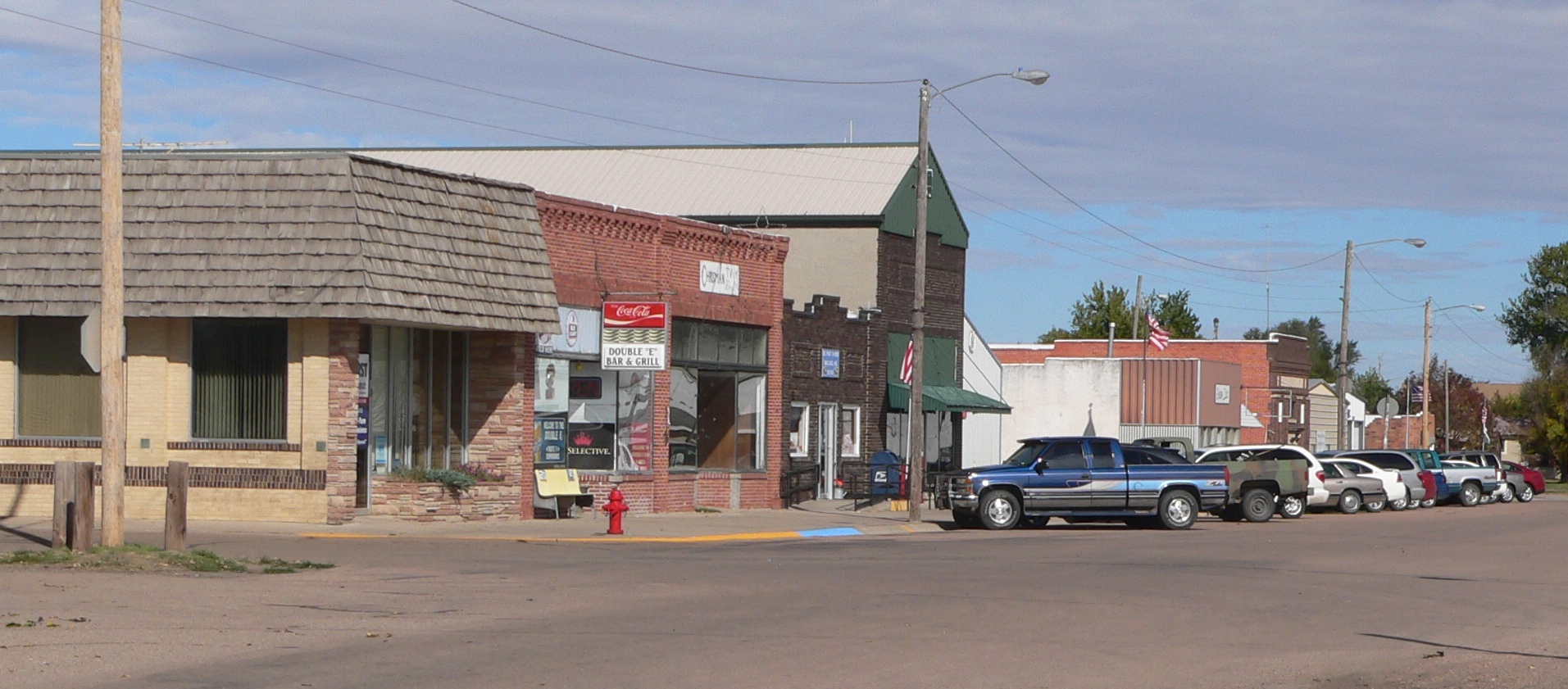
- Downtown Wallace

- Location of Wallace, Nebraska
- Coordinates: 40°50′15″N 101°09′52″W
- Country: United States
- State: Nebraska
- County: Lincoln

Area
  - Total: 0.71 sq mi (1.84 km^{2})
  - Land: 0.71 sq mi (1.84 km^{2})
  - Water: 0 sq mi (0.00 km^{2})
- Elevation: 3,110 ft (950 m)

Population (2020)
  - Total: 318
  - Density: 447.0/sq mi (172.58/km^{2})
- Time zone: UTC-6 (Central (CST))
  - Summer (DST): UTC-5 (CDT)
- ZIP code: 69169
- Area code: 308
- FIPS code: 31-51175
- GNIS feature ID: 2400086
- Website: villageofwallace-ne.com

Wallace is a village in Lincoln County, Nebraska, United States. It is part of the North Platte, Nebraska Micropolitan Statistical Area. As of the 2020 census, Wallace had a population of 318.

== History ==
When the railroad was extended in 1887 Wallace was platted.

== Geography ==
According to the United States Census Bureau, the village has a total area of 0.71 square miles (1.84 km^{2}), all land.

=== Climate ===
Climate data for Wallace 2W, Nebraska (1991–2020 normals, extremes 1962–present)
Month	Jan	Feb	Mar	Apr	May	Jun	Jul	Aug	Sep	Oct	Nov	Dec	Year
Record high °F (°C)	75 (24)	78 (26)	89 (32)	94 (34)	101 (38)	109 (43)	110 (43)	108 (42)	106 (41)	94 (34)	85 (29)	82 (28)	110 (43)
Mean maximum °F (°C)	61.7 (16.5)	66.7 (19.3)	78.2 (25.7)	85.3 (29.6)	91.9 (33.3)	98.1 (36.7)	101.7 (38.7)	98.9 (37.2)	95.7 (35.4)	87.0 (30.6)	74.6 (23.7)	63.8 (17.7)	103.1 (39.5)
Mean daily maximum °F (°C)	39.3 (4.1)	42.2 (5.7)	52.9 (11.6)	61.5 (16.4)	71.5 (21.9)	83.2 (28.4)	89.0 (31.7)	86.8 (30.4)	79.0 (26.1)	65.3 (18.5)	51.5 (10.8)	41.0 (5.0)	63.6 (17.6)
Daily mean °F (°C)	26.2 (−3.2)	28.7 (−1.8)	38.1 (3.4)	46.7 (8.2)	57.9 (14.4)	69.1 (20.6)	74.6 (23.7)	72.2 (22.3)	63.2 (17.3)	49.6 (9.8)	37.2 (2.9)	27.6 (−2.4)	49.3 (9.6)
Mean daily minimum °F (°C)	13.0 (−10.6)	15.2 (−9.3)	25.3 (−3.7)	32.0 (0.0)	44.2 (6.8)	55.1 (12.8)	60.3 (15.7)	57.5 (14.2)	47.3 (8.5)	33.8 (1.0)	22.9 (−5.1)	14.2 (−9.9)	34.9 (1.6)
Mean minimum °F (°C)	−7.3 (−21.8)	−4.4 (−20.2)	5.1 (−14.9)	18.1 (−7.7)	29.9 (−1.2)	43.8 (6.6)	50.8 (10.4)	47.9 (8.8)	34.1 (1.2)	18.3 (−7.6)	6.6 (−14.1)	−3.7 (−19.8)	−13.5 (−25.3)
Record low °F (°C)	−26 (−32)	−28 (−33)	−19 (−28)	3 (−16)	19 (−7)	31 (−1)	40 (4)	35 (2)	15 (−9)	0 (−18)	−20 (−29)	−33 (−36)	−33 (−36)
Average precipitation inches (mm)	0.30 (7.6)	0.56 (14)	0.88 (22)	2.22 (56)	3.47 (88)	3.83 (97)	3.24 (82)	2.65 (67)	1.56 (40)	1.66 (42)	0.51 (13)	0.49 (12)	21.37 (543)
Average snowfall inches (cm)	3.4 (8.6)	5.6 (14)	3.1 (7.9)	3.2 (8.1)	0.1 (0.25)	0.0 (0.0)	0.0 (0.0)	0.0 (0.0)	0.0 (0.0)	1.5 (3.8)	2.4 (6.1)	2.7 (6.9)	22.0 (56)
Average precipitation days (≥ 0.01 in)	2.9	4.0	5.2	7.7	10.3	9.6	8.1	6.8	5.5	5.7	3.2	3.0	72.0
Average snowy days (≥ 0.1 in)	2.4	3.1	2.4	1.4	0.1	0.0	0.0	0.0	0.0	0.7	1.6	2.3	14.0
Source: NOAA

== Demographics ==
Historical population
Census	Pop.	Note	%±
1900	130		—
1910	175		34.6%
1920	327		86.9%
1930	406		24.2%
1940	335		−17.5%
1950	361		7.8%
1960	293		−18.8%
1970	241		−17.7%
1980	349		44.8%
1990	308		−11.7%
2000	329		6.8%
2010	366		11.2%
2020	318		−13.1%
U.S. Decennial Census

=== 2010 census ===
As of the census of 2010, there were 366 people, 140 households, and 104 families residing in the village. The population density was 515.5 inhabitants per square mile (199.0/km^{2}). There were 152 housing units at an average density of 214.1 per square mile (82.7/km^{2}). The racial makeup of the village was 85.5% White, 1.1% Native American, 0.8% Asian, 10.4% from other races, and 2.2% from two or more races. Hispanic or Latino of any race were 17.2% of the population.

There were 140 households, of which 40.7% had children under the age of 18 living with them, 61.4% were married couples living together, 7.1% had a female householder with no husband present, 5.7% had a male householder with no wife present, and 25.7% were non-families. 22.1% of all households were made up of individuals, and 10% had someone living alone who was 65 years of age or older. The average household size was 2.61 and the average family size was 3.09.

The median age in the village was 35.8 years. 30.9% of residents were under the age of 18; 5.2% were between the ages of 18 and 24; 23.2% were from 25 to 44; 24.8% were from 45 to 64; and 15.8% were 65 years of age or older. The gender makeup of the village was 47.0% male and 53.0% female.

=== 2000 census ===
As of the census of 2000, there were 329 people, 134 households, and 97 families residing in the village. The population density was 467.5 inhabitants per square mile (180.5/km^{2}). There were 145 housing units at an average density of 206.0 per square mile (79.5/km^{2}). The racial makeup of the village was 99.39% White, 0.30% Native American, 0.30% from other races. Hispanic or Latino of any race were 0.61% of the population.

There were 134 households, out of which 32.8% had children under the age of 18 living with them, 64.2% were married couples living together, 3.7% had a female householder with no husband present, and 26.9% were non-families. 26.1% of all households were made up of individuals, and 11.9% had someone living alone who was 65 years of age or older. The average household size was 2.46 and the average family size was 2.95.

In the village, the population was spread out, with 28.9% under the age of 18, 4.6% from 18 to 24, 22.2% from 25 to 44, 24.3% from 45 to 64, and 20.1% who were 65 years of age or older. The median age was 42 years. For every 100 females, there were 86.9 males. For every 100 females age 18 and over, there were 98.3 males.

As of 2000 the median income for a household in the village was $36,771, and the median income for a family was $41,346. Males had a median income of $30,179 versus $19,688 for females. The per capita income for the village was $22,033. About 6.4% of families and 9.5% of the population were below the poverty line, including 18.3% of those under age 18 and none of those age 65 or over.
