= Neighborhoods of Omaha, Nebraska =

The neighborhoods of Omaha are a collection of historic and modern neighborhoods and specific ethnic and racial enclaves. They are spread throughout the Omaha metro area, and are all on the Nebraska side of the Missouri River. They include residential, retail, industrial, and mixed use facilitates connected through streets, sidewalks, bicycle and walking trails, and highways.

== History ==
Omaha's original neighborhoods were clustered around the original settlement area near 12th and Jackson Street. On the southwest corner of that intersection William P. Snowden, the city's first settler, built the St. Nicholas Hotel in 1854, three years before the city was incorporated. Early neighborhoods included the Sporting District and the Burnt District. In the early decades after settlement the city expanded, building the Near North Side, Sheelytown (Irish immigrants), and housing districts throughout what is now Downtown Omaha.

In the 1880s the next wave of development occurred where land was available at downtown's southern and western edges, including: Bemis Park, Dahlman, Deer Park, Dogtown, Gifford Park, Hanscom Park, and Kountze Place and Little Bohemia.

== Former towns ==
The boundaries of Omaha have changed significantly since its founding, with the city growing through subdivisions and annexations. The following areas of the city were incorporated towns which have been annexed by the city of Omaha. Beechwood was located near the now-gone Florence Lake in East Omaha. It had its own school district, and the site is now occupied by several trailer courts. Benson is a neighborhood of north-central Omaha near 60th and Maple Streets; it was annexed in 1917. Dundee is a neighborhood in central Omaha near 50th and Dodge Streets. Originally a separate city, Dundee was annexed by Omaha in 1915, but the residents fought annexation in the courts until 1917. Elkhorn takes its name from the Elkhorn River and was incorporated by an act of the territorial legislature in 1889. It was annexed by Omaha on March 8, 2005 after a two-year court battle. Elkhorn became part of Omaha on March 1, 2007. The original town site is near 204th St. and West Maple Road in West Omaha.

Florence is a neighborhood in far north Omaha. The original Mormon settlement in Florence, called Cutler's Park, predated the founding of Omaha in 1846. The City of Florence was annexed by Omaha in 1917. Hayes was a historic town located two miles from Bennington that evaporated in the 1870s, when the railroad failed to come to the town. Millard is a broad area of southwest Omaha, originally a separate city and annexed in 1971. The original town site is near 132nd and Q Streets. Saratoga is a historic neighborhood in North Omaha. The town was founded, boomed and busted within one year (1856–57). Its legacy includes a school, library and businesses still in the area.

== Adjoining cities and towns ==
Several nearby cities and towns operate as suburbs of Omaha. The largest is Bellevue, which may be the oldest settlement in Nebraska and is the state's third largest city. It is located just south of Omaha in eastern Sarpy County. Bennington was founded in the 1880s and was originally called "Bunz Town". Located northwest of the city, it was a key stop along the Fremont, Elkhorn, and Missouri Valley Railroad in the early 1900s. Carter Lake, Iowa, which was formerly on the eastern side of the Missouri River, today sits nestled into Nebraska. Irvington was first named Pappio because of its location on Pappio Creek. The city is increasingly encroaching on this town in its northwestern corner. La Vista is a city south of Omaha in north-central Sarpy County. Papillion is a city south of Omaha and immediately south of La Vista. It is the county seat of Sarpy County. Ralston is a city in south-central Douglas County roughly bounded by 72nd, 84th, L, and Harrison Streets. It is surrounded by Omaha on three sides. The other side borders with La Vista. Valley was established in 1886 and was an important shipping point along the Union Pacific Railroad. Waterloo was incorporated in 1883 along the Elkhorn river and borders the west of Omaha. Waterloo was once the world's largest shipper of seed corn, and was home of the Douglas County Fair for over 80 years.

== Community areas ==
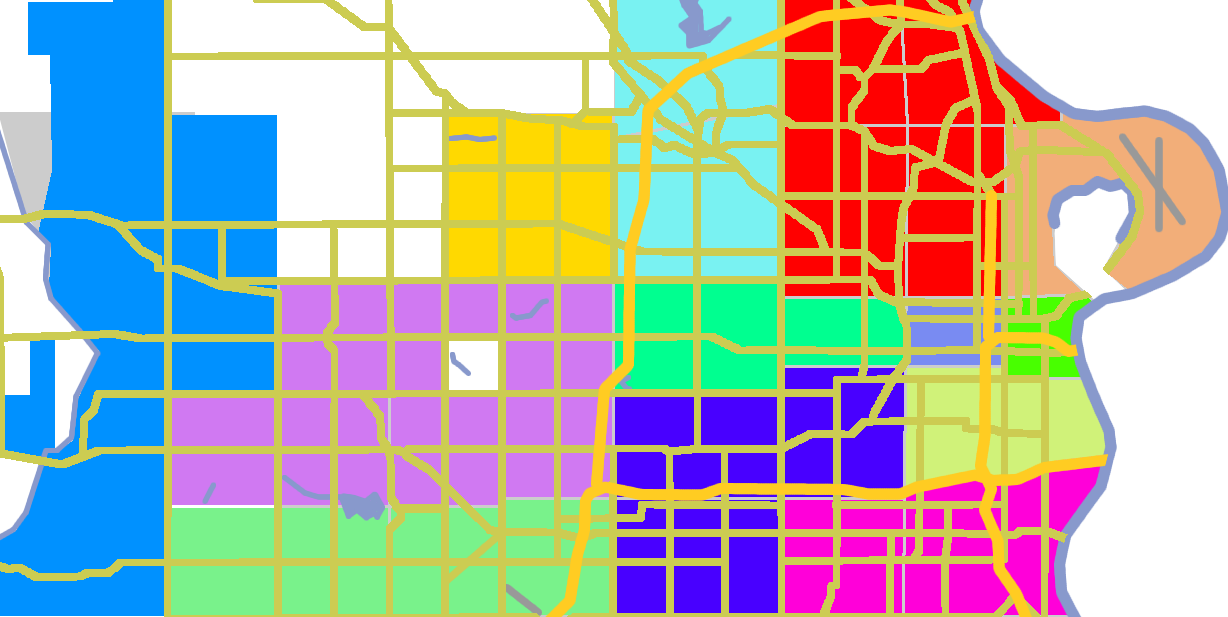
Community areas of Omaha, include Downtown-lime, East-peach, Midtown-blue-gray, North-red, South-pink, West-lavender

Omaha is split into several geographically designated areas, which cover several neighborhoods. Midtown is a racially diverse, historically rich area of Omaha immediately west of Downtown Omaha. North Omaha is a community area north of downtown Omaha with a rich historical, architectural, and religious legacy, particularly for the city's African American population. South Omaha is a community area encompassing many neighborhoods south of downtown Omaha which historically has been home to Omaha's Eastern European immigrant population, and more recently, Central and North American Hispanic immigrants. Churches and other structures reflect its rich past. Formerly a portion of this area was a separate city named South Omaha; it was annexed by Omaha in 1915. West Omaha is the collective term for areas of the city west of 72nd Street, and the area of newer suburbs and community institutions, the next wave of historically significant buildings. Within that broad area there are several sub-community areas including Northwest Omaha, Southwest Omaha, Millard and Irvington. Also, much further to the west is the newly annexed community area/past city of Elkhorn.

=== North Omaha ===
Scriptown was a conspicuous development first platted in 1855 to award Nebraska Territory legislators for the votes for statehood. It was bound by 16th street on the east, 24th on the west and Lake Street to the north. The area was developed quickly, and included a number of prominent homes. The land therein formed the nucleus of Near North Omaha. Near North Omaha became one of the most historically significant communities in Omaha, as it developed commercially and socially into the 20th century. The area was bound by downtown Omaha on the south and the Saratoga neighborhood on the north, 30th Street on the west and 16th Avenue on the east. Created by historical German, Irish, Jewish, and African Americans, the community became a renowned center of Black culture in the United States in the 1920s. From then through the 1960s, the area was dominated by black-owned businesses, churches and social centers. There were also a number of Jewish-owned businesses, as well. The area was the site of several riots in the 1960s, and decayed for the next 30 years. The Great Plains Black History Museum was started there in 1976. Over the last 20 years a series of community restoration projects, including the demolition of the Logan Fontenelle Housing Projects and the creation of Dreamland Plaza, has sought to revitalize the community.

The Saratoga community is the location of a historical town that boomed and busted within one year of its founding. Its legacy includes a school, library and businesses still in the area. Also in the area is Kountze Place, a former suburban enclave of wealthy Omaha doctors, lawyers and businessmen. The northeast part of North Omaha, roughly defined by all areas north of Dodge Street and east of 16th Street, until Fort Street when Florence Boulevard becomes the western boundary. The eastern boundary is the Missouri River. Neighborhoods in this section of North Omaha include Carter Lake, Iowa, East Omaha and Beechwood. Carter Lake was formerly on the eastern side of the Missouri River. Originally part of the township of East Omaha, the community was ceded to the State of Iowa after a contentious court battle in the late 1890s. Omaha's Levi Carter Park is located here. Beechwood was located near Florence Lake in East Omaha. Located next to the Missouri River and the now-dry Florence Lake, Beechwood had its own school district and commercial area. Today it is site of a trailer court by the same name. East Omaha proper was once an agricultural area. Once considered for the site of the Trans-Mississippi Exposition, it lost out to Kountze Park. Omaha's main airport, Eppley Airfield, is now in East Omaha, and the community has been the location of racial contention for several years. East Omaha was the first annexation to the City of Omaha in 1854.

Far north Omaha includes everything north of Ames Avenue, west of Florence Boulevard, and east of 72nd Street. It includes Florence, the original Mormon settlement of Cutler's Park, which predates the founding of the City of Omaha; it was annexed in 1917. Miller Park, a neighborhood named after Omaha pioneer Dr. George Miller, was primarily developed from 1920 to 1950, bound by 30th Street on the west and Florence Blvd on the east, Miller Park on the north and Sorenson Parkway on the south. It is the location of several churches, an elementary school and a park by the same name. Minne Lusa is a neighborhood in far North Omaha primarily developed from 1915 and 1926, and bound by Miller Park on the south, Florence on the north, Florence Boulevard and Pershing Drive on the east, and 30th Street on the west. The southwest part of North Omaha includes Benson, located near 60th and Maple Streets. Originally incorporated as a city in the 1880s, it was annexed to Omaha in 1917. Benson has several historic locations, and is an important neighborhood today. Next to Benson is Dundee, near 50th and Dodge Streets. Originally a separate city, Dundee was annexed by Omaha in 1915, but this annexation was fought until 1917. The Gold Coast neighborhood, including St. Cecilia Cathedral, has several important architectural gems, as well as several historical parks. Other important historical neighborhoods in this area include Gifford Park, Orchard Hill and Walnut Hill.

== Covenants and racial restrictions ==
Omaha has a history of race-restrictive housing. Housing covenants became common in the 1920s and were validated by the U.S. Supreme Court in 1926. Where there were small ethnic enclaves in early Omaha history, racial minorities were effectively limited to specific neighborhoods in North Omaha and a part of South Omaha. The black neighborhood in Omaha was clearly defined by redlining practices used by real estate agents, and was identified as the Near Northside. Kountze Place, the second Gold Coast, Dundee and other Omaha neighborhoods and blocks had racially or ethnically restrictive housing covenants.

Further restrictions on conveyance (rental, lease, sale, transfer) were often included, effectively defining most of the neighborhoods in Omaha during the first decades after establishment.

The Supreme Court ruled in 1948 that racial restrictions would no longer be enforced. After more than a decade of pressure from the Urban League and others, the City of Omaha adopted an Open Housing Ordinance in 1969. Although unenforceable, legal complications prevent the covenants from being expunged from property title documents.

== Neighborhoods ==
There are countless current and historically specific neighborhoods throughout Omaha. Perhaps prime among them is the Old Market, a mixed-use commercial/residential district in downtown Omaha that historically housed Omaha's fresh food vendors.

The central area of Omaha, immediately west of downtown and extending to 72nd Street, is home to several of historically significant neighborhoods. Gifford Park, Morton Meadows, Gold Coast and Country Club are important to the history of Omaha. Bemis Park is centrally located, and is home to a number of architecturally significant homes and public works.

Located in West Omaha is Boys Town, an incorporated village near 132nd and Dodge Streets and is home to the famous institution of the same name. Also on the fringe of the city is Chalco, an unincorporated area southwest of Omaha in northern Sarpy County that forms its own neighborhood.

South 24th Street, Sheelytown, Little Bohemia, Little Italy, Brown Park, Dog Hollow, and Little Poland are all located throughout South Omaha. Spring Lake and Deer Park are also located in the area, as well as Field Club and the Omaha Quartermaster Depot Historic District.

In North Omaha, the area of East Omaha was the first annexation to the city in 1854, and is home to a large park and the city's airport. Miller Park is a neighborhood in far North Omaha primarily developed from 1920 to 1950, bound by 30th Street on the west and Florence Blvd on the east, Miller Park on the north and Sorenson Parkway on the south. The Fort Omaha Historic District borders this neighborhood. Immediately to the north is Minne Lusa, a neighborhood primarily developed from 1900-1950, bound by Miller Park on the south, Florence on the north, Florence Blvd and Pershing Drive on the east and 30th Street on the west.

Near North Omaha is a historical neighborhood close to downtown Omaha. It is bound by downtown Omaha on the south and Kountze Park to the north. Kountze was once a posh Omaha suburb, reachable only via streetcar. It consumed most of the former Saratoga community's land to the north. 30th Street on the west and 16th Avenue on the east border each of these areas. Omaha's Prospect Hill neighborhood is home to the city's pioneer cemetery of the same name, as well as some of the oldest homes in the city.

=== List of neighborhoods in Omaha ===
Neighborhoods in Omaha alphabetical order
Name	Boundaries	Notes
Aksarben/Elmwood Park	South 50th Street to 72nd Street; Center to Pacific/Leavenworth	
Aksarben Village	South 63rd Street to 72nd Street; Center to Pacific.	
Applewood	South 90th Street to 108th Street; Harrison Street to "Q" Street.	
Armbrust Acres	South 168th Street to South 160th Avenue, West Center Road to "C" Street.	
Baker Place	Hamilton St on the south; Military Ave on the east and north; NW Radial Hwy on the west.	
Barrington Park	North 156th Street to 164th Street. California Street to Burt Street.	
Bemis Park	Cuming Street (south) to Hamilton Street (north); 40th Street (west) to 33rd Street (east)	Annexed to Omaha in 1887.
Bennington	Centered on North 156th Street and Bennington Road	Incorporated city within the Omaha Urban Planning Boundaries.
Benson	Fontenelle Boulevard to North 72nd Street, Ames to Western Avenue.	
Bent Creek	North 156th Street to 164th Street. California Street to Parker Street	
Blackstone	Saddle Creek to 36th Street; Leavenworth Street to Dodge Street.	Named after the Blackstone Hotel.
Boys Town	North 132nd Street to 144th Street; West Dodge Road to Pacific Street.	Technically an independent village and separate legal entity from Omaha.
Briar Hills	North 168th Street and Blondo.	
Bridlewood	North 162nd Avenue to 168th Street; Blondo Street to Corby Street.	
Broadwood Heights-Golden Valley	South 90th to 84th Streets, Harney Street to Shamrock Road.	
Brookhaven	South 108th Street to 118th Street; Harrison Street to "Y" Street.	
Buena Vista		
Burlington Road	South 42nd Street, L Street, Interstate 80 and Dahlman Avenue	
Burnt District	16th Street to Missouri River; Douglas Street to Cass Street.	
Cathedral Landmark District	North 38th Street between Capitol Avenue and Cuming Street.	
Carter Lake	The Carter Lake, Carter Lake Drive, Abbott Drive, North 11th Street and Avenue H.	An independent city located in the only part of Iowa west of the Missouri River
Chalco	Centered on South 144th Street and Chandler Road.	
Conestoga Place	North 22nd to North 23rd, Grace to Clark Streets	
Country Club	50th to 56th Streets, from Corby to Seward Streets.	Added to the National Register of Historic Places in 2004.
Dahlman	South of downtown Omaha	
Deer Park	10th Street to Missouri River; "D" Street to I-80.	
Dundee	Happy Hollow Boulevard to 46th Street; Leavenworth Street to Hamilton Street	
Eagle Ridge	Between 48th Street and 72nd Street on Cornhusker Road.	
Eagle Run	North 132nd to 144th Street. Binney Street to West Maple Road.	
Elkhorn	204th Street to 240th Street; West Center Road to West Maple Road	Annexed by Omaha in 2005. Former city.
Elmwood Park	South 50th to 72nd Streets; Dodge Street to Leavenworth Street	Annexed to Omaha in 1917 along with the neighboring Dundee neighborhood.
Fairacres	North 62nd to 69th Streets; Fairacres Road and Burt Street to Dodge Street.	
Five Fountains	North 192nd to 180th Streets, the Old Lincoln Highway to West Dodge Road.	
Florence	North 30th Street between Craig Avenue and Bondesson Street	The Mormon Pioneer Cemetery and Omaha Winter Quarters LDS Temple are located in Florence.
Field Club	32nd Avenue to 36th Street; Center Street to Pacific Street.	
First National Business Park	West Dodge Road between 132nd Street and 144th Street	
Fountain Hills	South 156th Street to 163rd Street; Pacific Street to Farnam Street.	
Gifford Park	North Freeway to North 38th Street; Dodge to Cuming Street.	
Gold Coast	36th Street to 40th Street; Jones Street to Cuming Street.	One of Omaha's largest homes, the George A. Joslyn Mansion is located in Gold Coast.
Greenfields	South 163rd to 156th Streets, West Dodge Road to Capitol Avenue and Nottingham Drive.	
Green Meadows	North 134th to 141st Street. Patrick Avenue to Corby Street.	
Hanscom Park	I-480 to South 42nd Street; I-80 to Center Street.	
Happy Hollow	Happy Hollow Boulevard between Leavenworth Street and Western Avenue	
Harvey Oaks	Bob Boozer Drive to South 144th Street, Hickory Street to West Center Road.	
Hillsborough	North 132nd Street to 144th Street. West Maple Road to Fort Street.	
Howard Street Apartment District	South 22nd Street to 24th Street; Landon Court to Harney Street.	
Huntington Park	156th to 165th, Blondo to Maple	Huntington Park Website
Indian Hills Village	90th to 84th Streets, Indian Hills Drive to Westover Road.	
Irvington	Irvington Road between Ida Street and State Street.	
Keystone	N.72nd to N.90th, Maple st to Fort/Military Rd	Keystone Trail starts at Democracy Park in Keystone
Kountze Place	North 16th Avenue to 30th Street; Locust Street to Pratt Street.	
La Vista	South 72nd Street to I-80; Harrison Street to Giles Road.	Incorporated city - newest in Nebraska (1960)
Leawood Southwest	South 168th Street to Bob Boozer Drive, Hickory Street and Wood Drive to West Center Road.	
Leawood West	South 132nd Street to S 126th St, Harney Street and Westover Road to Pacific Street.	
Leavenworth	Leavenworth Street between South 20th Street and 33rd Street.	
Linden Park-Lindenwood	North 132nd to 144th Street. Hamilton to Blondo Streets.	
Little Bohemia	South 10th Street to 16th Street; Pierce Street to Martha Street.	
Little Italy	South 10th Street to Missouri River; Pacific Street to Center Street.	
Maple Village	Centered at North 90th Street and Maple Street.	
Meridian Park	Southeast of 168th Street & Giles Road	
Midtown Crossing	Dodge Street to Farnam Street between 33rd Street and Turner Boulevard.	
Millard	Millard Avenue between 144th Street and "L" Street.	
Miller Park	Florence Boulevard to North 30th Street; Sorensen Parkway to Redick Avenue.	
Minne Lusa	North 24th Street to 30th Street; Read Street and Vane Street to Redick Avenue.	
Morton Meadows	42nd Street to Saddle Creek Road; Center Street to Leavenworth Street.	
Mockingbird Heights	South 84th Street to 96th Street; "Q" Street to "L" Street.	
Near North Side	16th Street to 30th Street; Cuming Street to Locust Street.	
Oak Heights	South 102nd Street to 108th Street; "Q" Street to Berry Street.	
Old Gold Coast		
Old Market Historic District	10th Street to 13th Street; Jackson Street to Farnam Street.	Added to the National Register of Historic Places in 1979.
Omaha View	Lake Street to Maple Street; 31st Street to 34th Avenue/John Creighton Blvd	
Orchard Hill	Hamilton Street to Blondo Street; 36th Street to Military Avenue.	
Original Montclair (Omaha)	Hamilton Street to Cuming Street; 30th Street to 33rd Street	Site of the Oregon Trail featuring a boulder monument on 30th and Lincoln Blvd.
Pacific Hollow	South 158th to 152nd Street, Pacific Street to Hickory Street	
Pacific Meadows	South 163rd to 156th Street, Douglas-Farnam Street to Pacific Street.	
Pacific Park	South 168th Street to Bob Boozer Drive, Pacific Street to Hickory Street and Wood Drive.	
Papillion	South 48th Street to 144th Street; Giles Road to Capehart Road.	An independent city founded in 1870.
Park Avenue	Pacific St to Woolworth St; South 29th St to South 33rd St; Park Ave from Leavenworth Ave to Ed Creighton Ave.	Formerly Ford Birthsite.
Park East	South 20th Street to 28th Street; Dodge Street to Leavenworth Street.	
Pepperwood	North of 150th and Dodge to 156th and Blondo	
Prospect Hill	North 30th Street to 36th Street; Lake Street to Hamilton Street.	Prospect Hill Cemetery is the oldest in Omaha.
Ralston	South 72nd Street to 84th Street; Harrison Street to "Q" Street.	An independent city, landlocked on three sides by Omaha, with La Vista bordering to the south.
Raven Oaks	North 60th Street to 50th Street; Willit Street to Raven Oaks Drive.	
Roanoke	North 108th Street to 120th Street, Fort Street to Taylor Street.	
Robin Hill	South 42nd Street to South 50th Street; Spring Street to I-80.	
Royalwood Estates	South 120th Street to 132nd Street, West Center Road to Shirley Street.	
Regency	South 96th Street to Regency Parkway; Pacific Street to West Dodge Road.	
Roxbury	South 108th Street to I-80; "Q" Street to "X" Street.	
Saratoga	North 24th Street between Ames Avenue and Storz Expressway.	
Sheelytown	Located just north of The Union Stockyards.	Former Irish enclave; now defunct.
South Omaha Main Street Historic District	South 24th Street between "M" and "O" Streets.	
Sporting District	16th and Harney Street.	
Spring Lake	Missouri River to Kennedy Freeway; I-80 to Missouri Avenue.	This neighborhood's association dissolved as of February 2020
Squatter's Row	Between North 11th and North 13th Streets, from Nicholas to Locust Streets	
Sunny Slope	108th Street to I-680, Fort Street to Maple Street	
Trendwood	S 144th St to 132nd St, West Center Rd to Pacific St	
Valley	Highway 275 to North 288th Street; Meigs Street to Ida Street.	Incorporated City
Vinton Street Commercial Historic District	Vinton Street between Elm Street and South 17th Street.	
Walnut Hill	North 40th Street to Saddle Creek Road; Cuming to Hamilton Street.	
Waterloo	Highway 275 between Blondo Street and West Maple Road.	Independent city, located just west of the Elkhorn neighborhood.
Wedgewood	South 120th Street to Crestridge Road, Leavenworth Road to Mayberry Street.	
West Farnam neighborhood	38th and Farnam Street.	
Westgate	72nd to 84th Streets, W. Center Rd to I-80	
Westside	84th to 90th Streets, Pacific St to W. Center Rd	
Windridge Hills	North 156th to 159th Streets, Western Avenue to Blondo Street.	

== See also ==
- Community areas in Omaha
- Landmarks in Omaha, Nebraska
- Council Bluffs, Iowa

== See also ==
- History of Omaha, Nebraska
