= Morton Meadows =

Neighborhood in Omaha, Nebraska, U.S.

Morton Meadows is a historic neighborhood located in Midtown Omaha, Nebraska. The neighborhood lies between Center and Leavenworth Streets, from 42nd Street to Saddle Creek, and is sometimes referred to by its central boulevard, Twin Ridge. It is near the Dundee area, as well as the Gold Coast, Field Club and Country Club historic districts.

== About ==
The neighborhood is home to the University of Nebraska Medical Center. Among its many historic churches, Bethel Lutheran at 1312 S. 45th Street, was founded in 1916 and celebrated its 90th anniversary in 2006. The church has Georgian Colonial architecture and stained glass designed by a parish member. It was featured in a tour of Midtown churches. Morton Meadows is one of the many area neighborhoods that may be affected by a proposed relocation of Omaha's Saddle Creek Road.

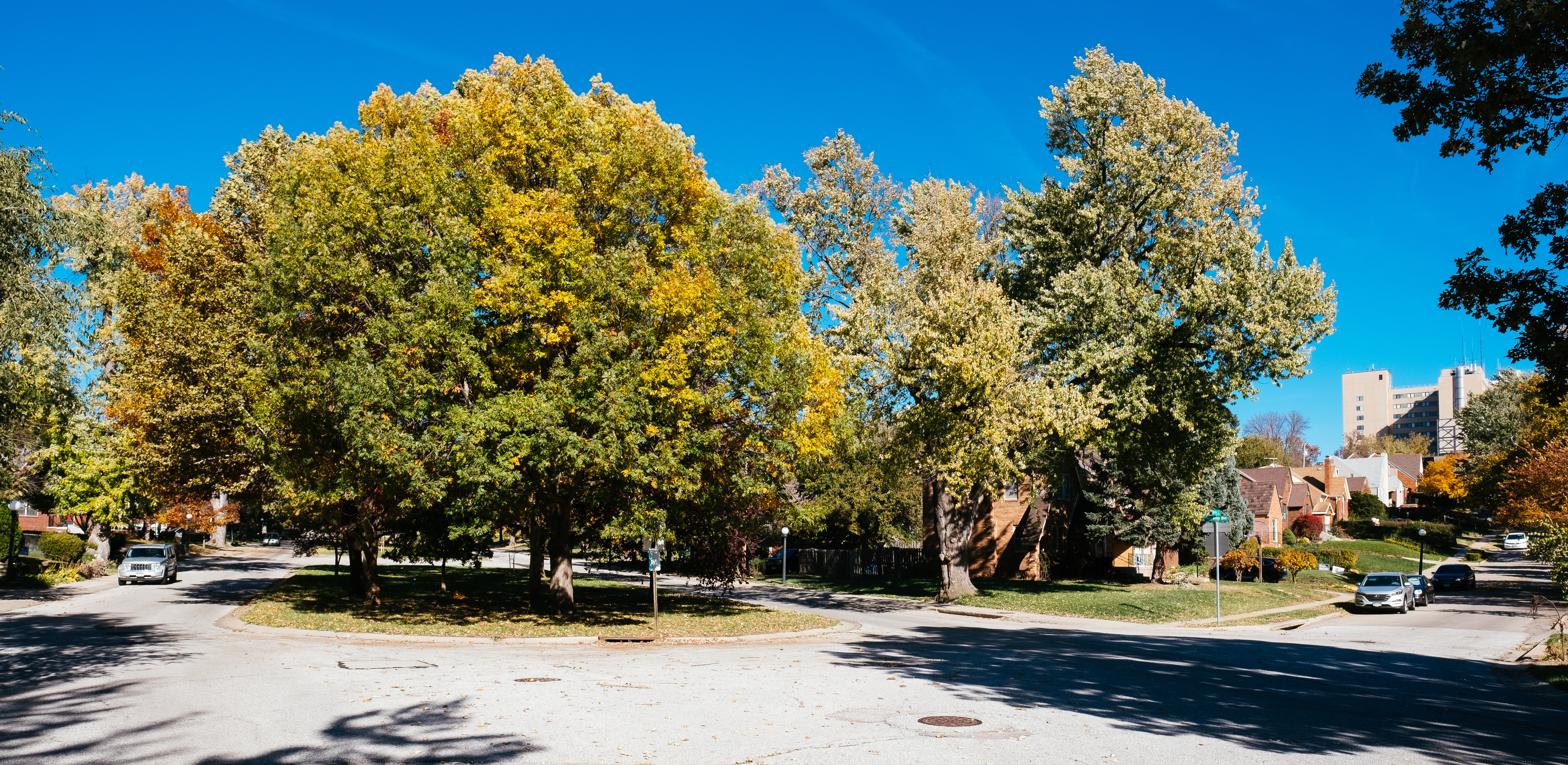
Twin Ridge Boulevard

== Proposed Twin Ridge/Morton Meadows Historic District ==
This neighborhood was founded in 1924 by George Morton as an attempt to portray the beauty of Omaha in a safe and family-friendly environment. According to the City of Omaha, the neighborhood is currently in application process to be recognized as an historic district of significance to be listed on the National Register of Historic Places. In 2004, a survey found that 232 of the 295 total properties surveyed could be classified as contributing to the historic nature of the district. Much of the neighborhood bounded by Woolworth Avenue on the north, South 48th Street on the west, Center Street on the south, and South 42nd Street on the east is eligible for the National Register of Historic Places.

The region qualifies for the Register under Criterion C: Architecture, as an example of early twentieth-century residential architecture. Architecturally, the homes form a cohesive grouping in that they are of similar scale, massing, materials and setback. Many of the brick houses in the district are examples of the Tudor Revival style, but the Bungalow and Colonial Revival styles are also present. The district also qualifies under Criterion A: Community Planning and Development, as an example of the garden city style of community planning. The curvilinear Morton Avenue and the broad, park-like Twin Ridge Boulevard are two of the district's distinctive garden city features.

The majority of structures in this region were built between 1922, when development of the tract began, and 1945, when development ended.

The Morton Meadows Neighborhood Association is composed of officers and committees. The committees include Beautification, Event Planning, Grant Writing, Community Outreach and Citizen Patrol and have several members each.

Morton Meadows has seen an improvement in property values mainly due to the overall efforts to revitalize the Midtown Omaha area, the neighborhood's close proximity to large employers and the University of Nebraska Medical Center located within a mile (1.6 km).

== See also ==
- Neighborhoods of Omaha, Nebraska

== Bibliography ==
- Larson and Cottrell, (1997) The Gate City p. 152-53, 157.
- Mead and Hunt, Inc. (2003) Reconnaissance Survey of Selected Neighborhoods in Central Omaha. Prepared for the City of Omaha. p. 7–8
- Rock, D. (ed) (2000) Dundee, Neb: A Pictorial History. Omaha, NE: Shurson Printing.
- Erickson, D. (2000) E Pluribus Omaha: Immigrants All. Omaha, NE: Historical Society of Omaha and Lamplighter Press. p. 1–32, 37–38.
- Omaha City Planning Department (nd) A Comprehensive Program for Historic Preservation in Omaha. p. 90.

41°14′N 95°59′W
