= Gifford Park =

Historic neighborhood in midtown Omaha, Nebraska

Coordinates: 41°15′53″N 95°57′42″W

Gifford Park is a historic neighborhood in midtown Omaha, Nebraska. It is roughly bounded by the North Freeway on the east, North 38th Street on the west, Dodge Street on the south and Cuming Street on the north. Its namesake park was added to the City parks network in 1916. The neighborhood is bounded by several historic neighborhoods, including Bemis Park, Gold Coast, and the Near North Side.

== History ==
The land that comprises Gifford Park was part of one of the first claims in Omaha City, made by the first mayor of Omaha, Jesse Lowe. The community is named after Harold Gifford, who donated the property that became Gifford Park at 35th and Davenport Streets to the City of Omaha in 1912 for a neighborhood park. It was added to the city park system in 1916. The area of 33rd and California was a busy commercial center in the 1920s and 1930s. The area included grocery stores, an upholstery shop, dentist, a delicatessen, tavern, bakery, theatre, barber shop, and a variety store. Other businesses in the area included a filling station, ice house, the California Beauty School, garage, butcher shop and drug store.

Several schools served the community. They included Yates Elementary School at 3260 Davenport Street, Tech High School at North 30th and Cuming Street, and the Duchesne Academy of the Sacred Heart at North 36th and Burt Streets.

The neighborhood was greatly damaged during the Easter Tornado of 1913. Several houses and buildings in the area, including Ducshene Academy, were greatly damaged.

== Present ==
The neighborhood is the location of a twenty-year-old and highly active neighborhood association committed to preserving and uplifting the community. Several ongoing improvement projects aim to beautify the neighborhood, particularly by renovating the park. Today the Gifford Park is 5.6 acres (23,000 m^{2}), including a playground, ball field, two tennis courts, walking paths and a shelter area. The neighborhood is home to many historic houses like Red Rocks, formally known as the Thomas Kilpatrick House.

== See also ==
- Neighborhoods in Omaha, Nebraska

== Bibliography ==
- Truhlsen, S. (1999) "Harold Gifford Sr., M.D. Omaha's premier turn of the century ophthalmologist." Documenta Ophthalmologica. 99(3), November. pp. 237–245.
