= Brandeis–Millard House =

Historic house in Nebraska, United States

- U.S. National Register of Historic Places
- Omaha Landmark
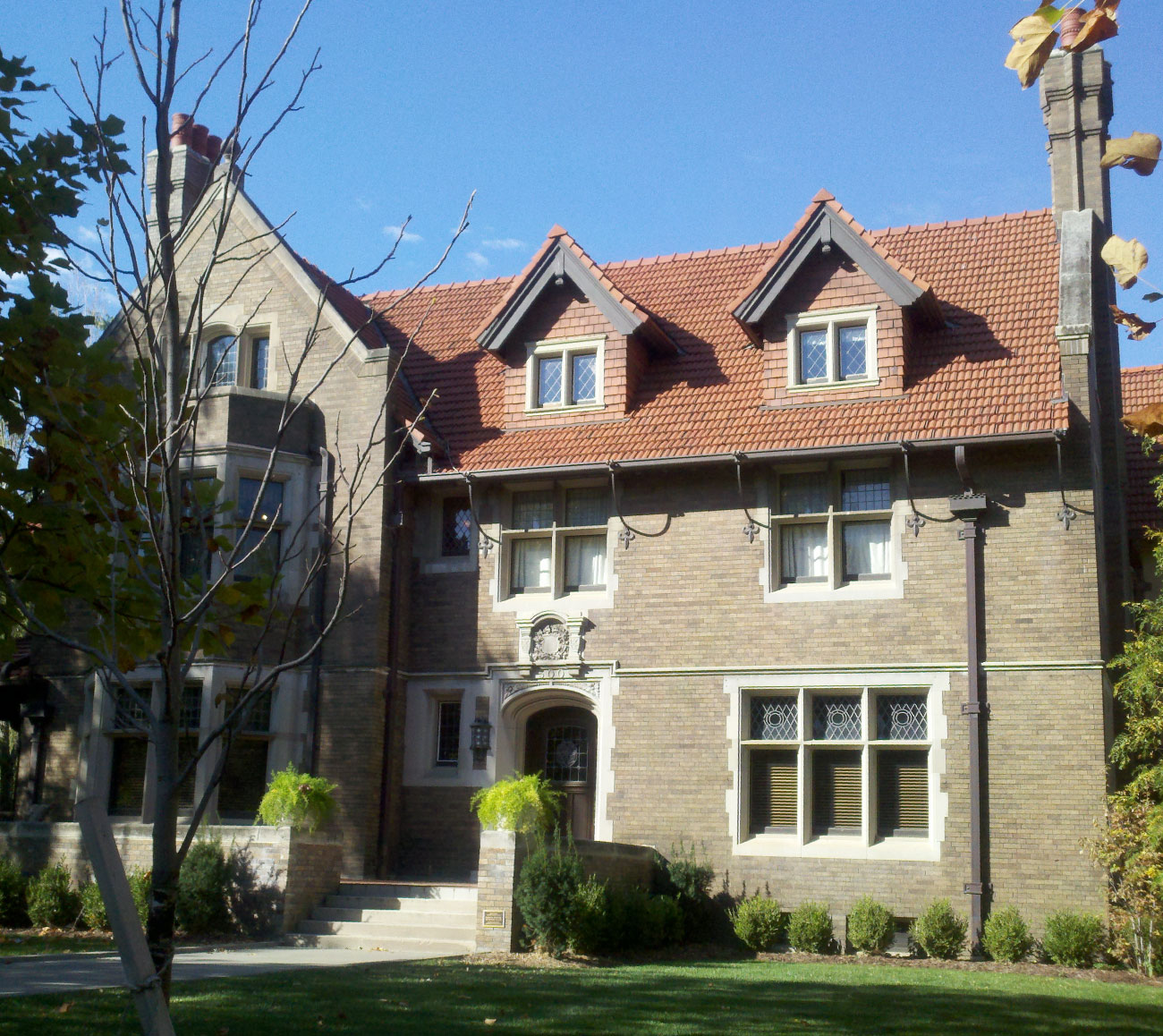

- Location within Nebraska Location within the United States
- Location: 500 South 38th Street, Omaha, Nebraska
- Coordinates: 41.25581382384942°N 95.96943688950418°W
- Built: 1904
- Architect: Albert Kahn
- Architectural style: Tudor Revival
- NRHP reference No.: 80002446

Significant dates
- Added to NRHP: November 28, 1980
- Designated OMAL: June 10, 1986

The Brandeis–Millard House is located in the West Farnam neighborhood, which is part of the Gold Coast Historic District in Midtown Omaha, Nebraska. Its carriage house is located at 3815 Dewey Avenue in the same area. Listed on the National Register of Historic Places in 1980, it was designated an Omaha Landmark on June 10, 1986.

== About ==
An early example of the Jacobethan style of architecture, the house is the only known work of Albert Kahn in the state. It was built in 1904 for Arthur and Zerlina Brandeis of the notable Omaha mercantile family. The house was purchased in 1909 by Jessie H. Millard as a residence for herself and her father, Senator Joseph H. Millard, who was a pioneer Omahan that served as president of the Omaha National Bank, mayor of Omaha in 1871, and as a U.S. senator from 1901 to 1907. The family occupied the residence until 1922.

== See also ==
- J. L. Brandeis and Sons Store
