= Garneau =

Garneau may refer to:

== Persons ==
- Garneau (surname)

== Places ==
- École Secondaire Catholique Garneau, a school in Ottawa, Canada
- Garneau River, a tributary of the Turgeon River in Canada
- Garneau, Edmonton, a neighborhood in Edmonton, Canada
- Garneau Theatre, Edmonton, Canada
- Garneau–Kilpatrick House, Omaha, Nebraska
