= Harry Buford House =

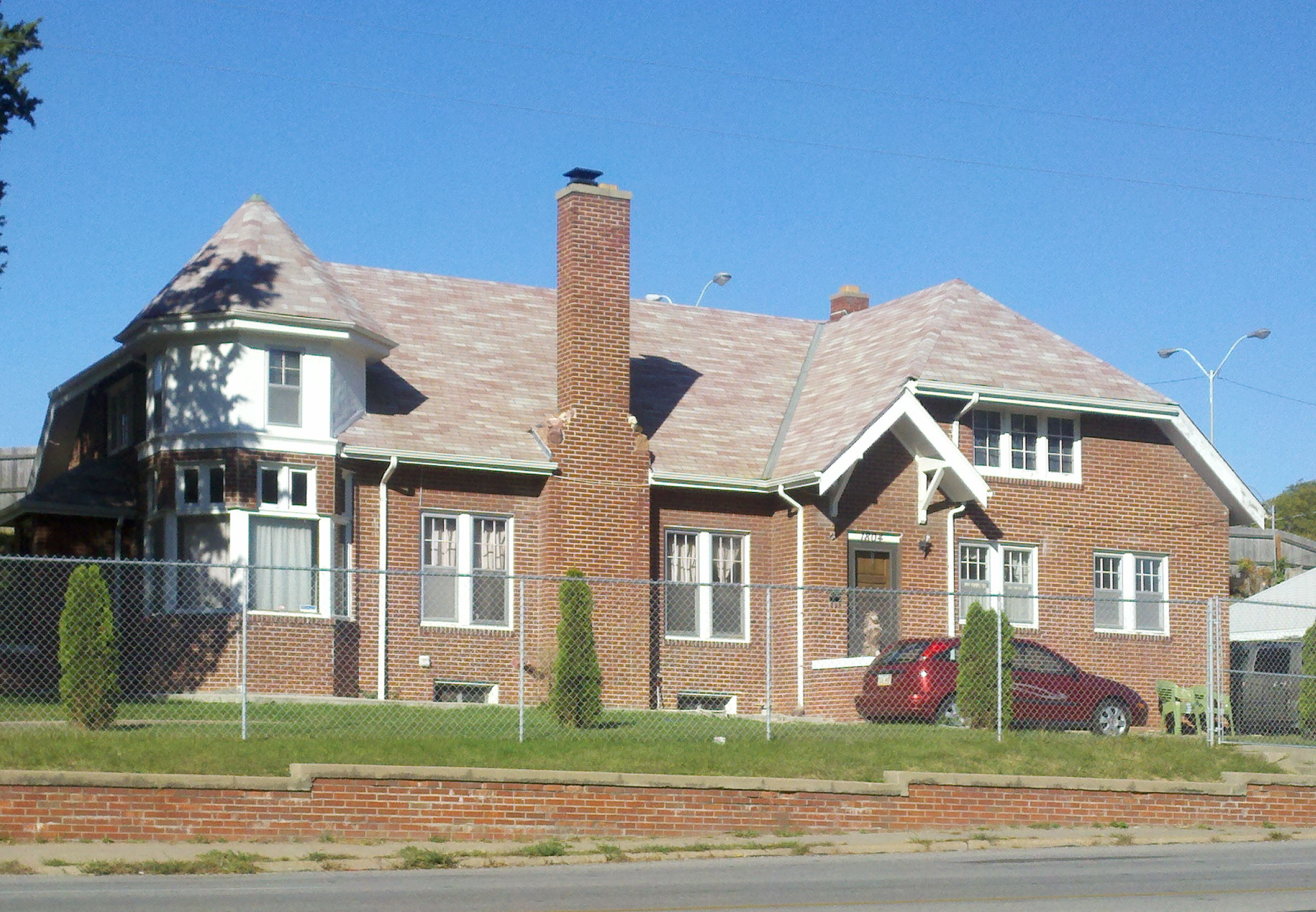
- Harry Buford House

- Location within Nebraska
- 41°16′33″N 95°57′25″W
- Location: Omaha, Nebraska

History
- Built: 1929

Omaha Landmark
- Designated: April 12, 1983

The Harry Buford House is a historic house located at 1804 North 30th Street in North Omaha, Nebraska. Built in 1929 in a Period Revival style, it was designated a landmark by the City of Omaha in 1983.

== History ==
Harry Buford was an African American associate of the political organization of city boss Tom Dennison. Reportedly, the location of the Buford House on the west side of 30th Street indicated the status of the Buford family in Omaha during a time of racial segregation.

The Buford house is a rare example of Period Revival style located in an inner city neighborhood such as the Near North Side of Omaha, rather than with the majority of houses of that style, which were being constructed in the then-new suburban neighborhoods of Country Club, Minne Lusa, and Morton Meadows.

== See also ==
- Jack Broomfield
- Architecture in North Omaha, Nebraska
- History of North Omaha
- Landmarks in Omaha
