= Leavenworth, Omaha =

Neighborhood in Omaha, Nebraska

Leavenworth
- Neighborhood
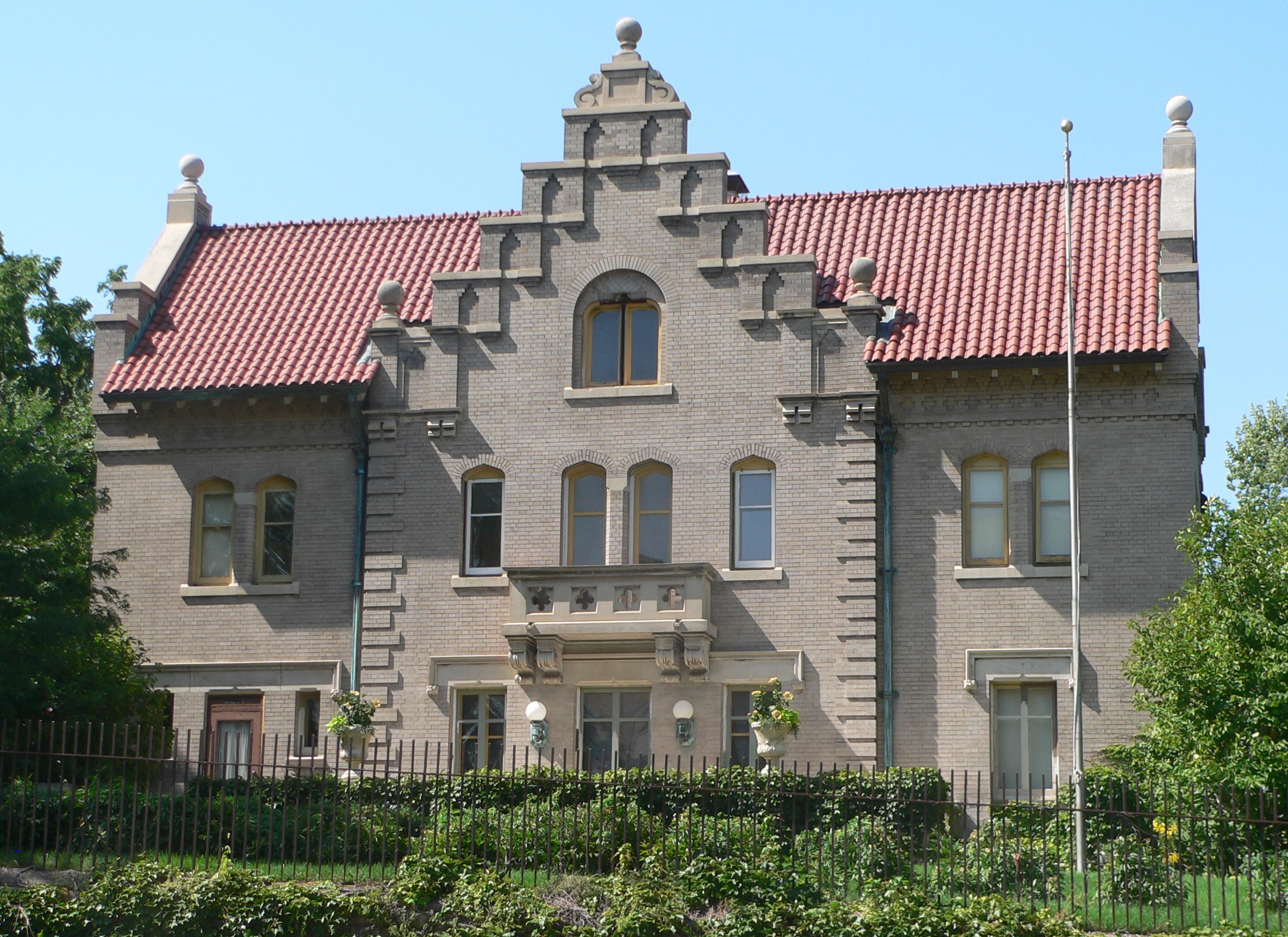
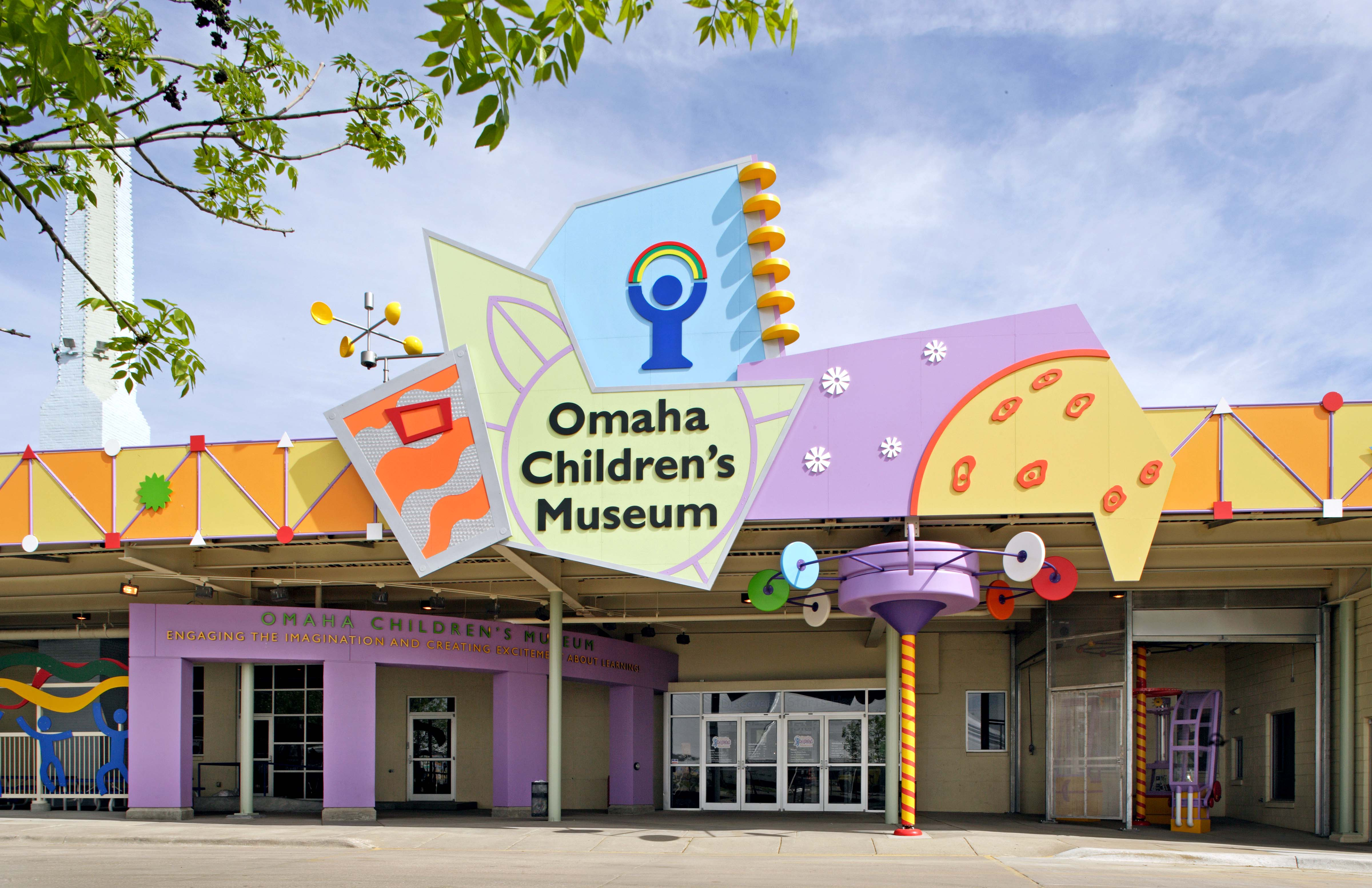
- Top to bottom: Mary Rogers Kimball House and the Omaha Children's Museum, both in Leavenworth
- Interactive map of Leavenworth
- Coordinates: 41°15′13″N 95°57′00″W
- Country: United States
- State: Nebraska
- City: Omaha

Area
  - Total: 2.8 sq mi (7.3 km^{2})

Population (2019)
  - Total: 3,154

Leavenworth is a neighborhood in the midtown region of Omaha, Nebraska. It is bounded by Harney Street to the north, 20th Street to the east, Leavenworth Street and Mason Street to the south, and Turner Boulevard to the west. Leavenworth is straddled by the Gerald R. Ford Expressway, roughly dividing the neighborhood into a business district in the east and a residential area in the west. The neighborhood is home to the Omaha Children's Museum, a popular attraction in the midtown area. Leavenworth is also home to the historic Mary Rogers Kimball House.

== Amenities and facilities ==
=== Parks ===
- Dewey Park
- Turner Park in nearby Midtown Crossing

=== Schools ===
- Liberty Elementary School
- Jackson Elementary School
- Jackson Alternative Center
- St. Peter's School

=== Congregations ===
- Abundant Mercy Pentecostal Church
- Christian Science First Church
- First Baptist Church
- FLC Omaha
- St. Peter's Church

=== Clubs ===
- YMCA of Greater Omaha

=== Governmental services ===
The United States Postal Service operates a post office adjacent to the Leavenworth neighborhood on Leavenworth Street.
