= Leavenworth =

Leavenworth may refer to:

== Geography ==
- Leavenworth, Indiana
- Leavenworth, Minnesota
- Leavenworth, a neighborhood of Omaha, Nebraska
- Leavenworth, Washington
- Leavenworth County, Kansas, a county in northeast Kansas
  - Leavenworth, Kansas, a city in the county which includes the fort and federal prisons within its city limits
  - Roman Catholic Diocese of Leavenworth
- East Leavenworth, Missouri, an extinct hamlet across the Missouri River from Leavenworth, Kansas

== Institutions and structures ==
- Fort Leavenworth, a U.S. Army base in Leavenworth, Kansas
  - Fort Leavenworth National Cemetery, a cemetery on the base
  - Midwest Joint Regional Correctional Facility, often referred to as Leavenworth, a military prison built on the grounds of Fort Leavenworth
  - United States Penitentiary, Leavenworth, often referred to as Leavenworth, a civilian medium security prison built in the town of Leavenworth, Kansas
  - United States Disciplinary Barracks, often referred to as Leavenworth, a military maximum security prison built on the grounds of Fort Leavenworth

== People ==
- Henry Leavenworth, U.S. soldier who established Fort Leavenworth
- Jesse Henry Leavenworth, U.S. soldier, son of Henry Leavenworth
