= Ansonia Apartments =

- U.S. Historic district – Contributing property
- Omaha Landmark
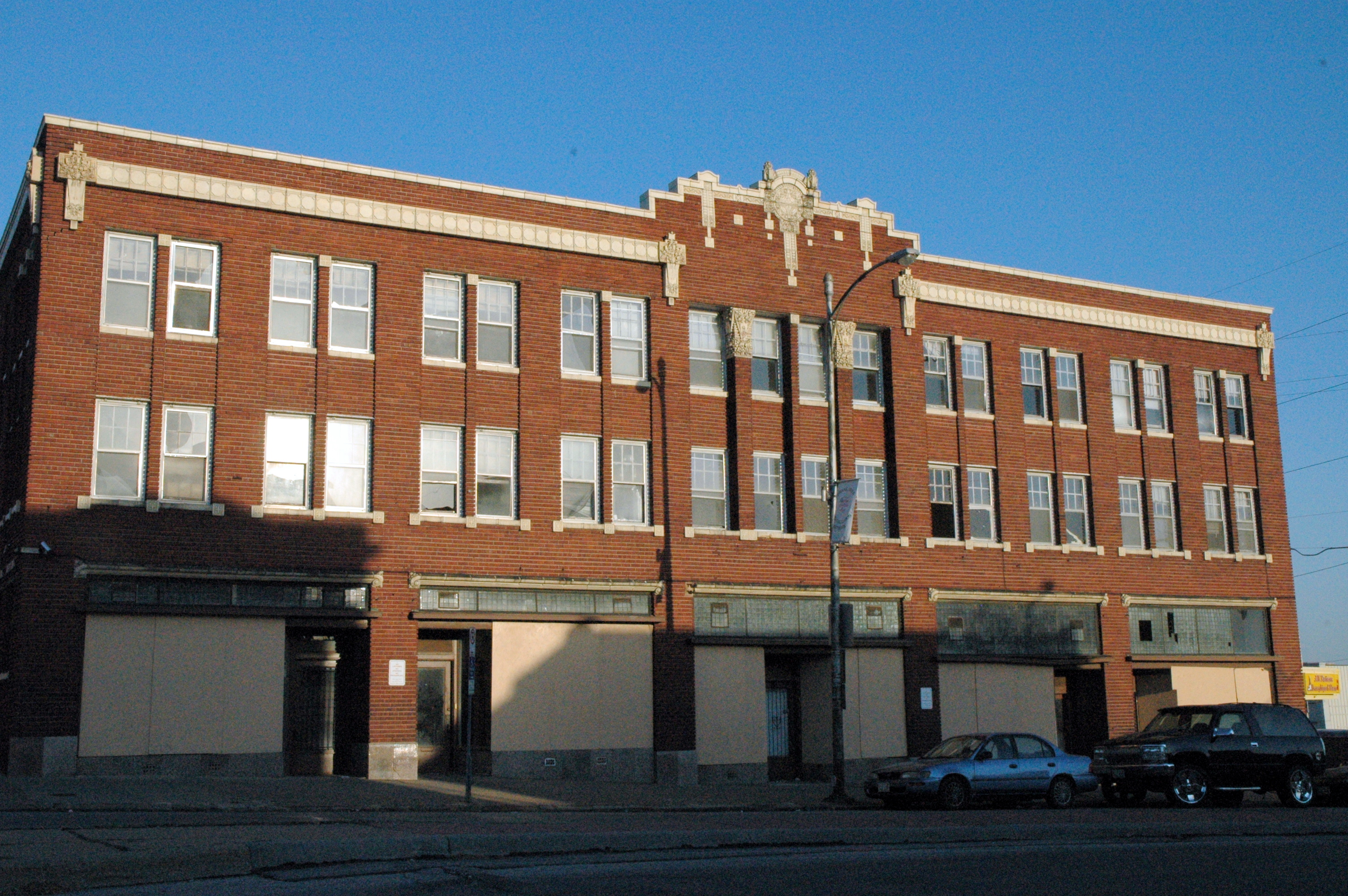
- The Ansonia Apartments

- Location within Nebraska Location within the United States
- Location: 2221–2223 Jones Street, Omaha, Nebraska
- Coordinates: 41°15′11.52″N 95°56′36.86″W
- Built: 1929
- Built by: Concrete Engineering Company of Omaha
- Architectural style: Arts and Crafts
- Part of: Drake Court Historic District (ID14000258)

Significant dates
- Designated CP: June 4, 2014
- Designated OMAL: March 27, 1984

The Ansonia Apartments, located at 2221-23 Jones Street in the Midtown area of Omaha, Nebraska. Built in 1929 in a period Revival/Arts and Crafts style, the buildings were designated an Omaha Landmark on March 27, 1984. It was added to the Drake Court Historic District, and was added to the National Register of Historic Places on June 4, 2014.

The Ansonia Apartment building was built in a U-shape that with end walls facing the street. Adjacent to the neighboring Dartmore Apartments, the Ansonia Apartment building displays both Arts and Crafts and Period Revival elements.

== See also ==
- Landmarks in Omaha, Nebraska
