= West Farnam neighborhood =

Coordinates: 41°15′22″N 95°58′08″W

- Nickname: Blackstone neighborhood
- Interactive map of West Farnam neighborhood
- Country: USA
- Established: 1887
- Website: ci.omaha.ne.us

The West Farnam neighborhood or the Blackstone neighborhood in Omaha, Nebraska is located from Dodge Street on the north to Leavenworth Street on the south, Highway 75/Interstate 480 on the east to South 52nd Street on the west. In 1997, the Gold Coast Historic District was formed from the West Farnam neighborhood and the Park Place neighborhood, known today as Cathedral. Named for its principal thoroughfare, West Farnam was a prime real estate area in the first quarter of the 20th century. It is home to several historical landmarks, including houses, churches, and former hotels.

== Historic properties ==
Historic properties in the West Farnam neighborhood
Name	Address	Built	Notes
Blackstone Hotel	302 South 36th Street	1915	Late 19th And 20th Century Revivals, Second Renaissance Revival
Gottlieb Storz House	3708 Farnam Street	1905	Tudor Revival
Brandeis-Millard House	500 South 38th Street	1904	Tudor Revival

== See also ==
- Neighborhoods of Omaha, Nebraska
- History of Omaha
