= Northwest Omaha =

Landmark multiple-neighborhood community area

Coordinates: 41°18′15″N 96°07′19″W

Northwest Omaha is a community area in Omaha, Nebraska. It holds several neighborhoods. The area is loosely bound by West Maple Road to the south, the Douglas-Washington County line to the north, Elkhorn to the west, and McKinley Street, I-680, and 72nd Street to the east.

== Neighborhoods ==
Northwest Omaha's neighborhoods are racially and economically diverse. Bennington, Irvington, sub-divisions along Blair High Road, sub-divisions around Standing Bear Lake, and the Briggs Neighborhood.

== Landmarks ==
Some landmarks of the area are Omaha Northwest High School, the closed roller skating rink in Irvington, Tranquility Park, 20 Grand Movie Theatre, and the new Bennington High School.

== Media ==
A radio station based in Northwest Omaha is KCRO.

== See also ==
- Neighborhoods of Omaha, Nebraska
- Landmarks in Omaha, Nebraska
