= Community areas in Omaha =

Subdivisions of Omaha

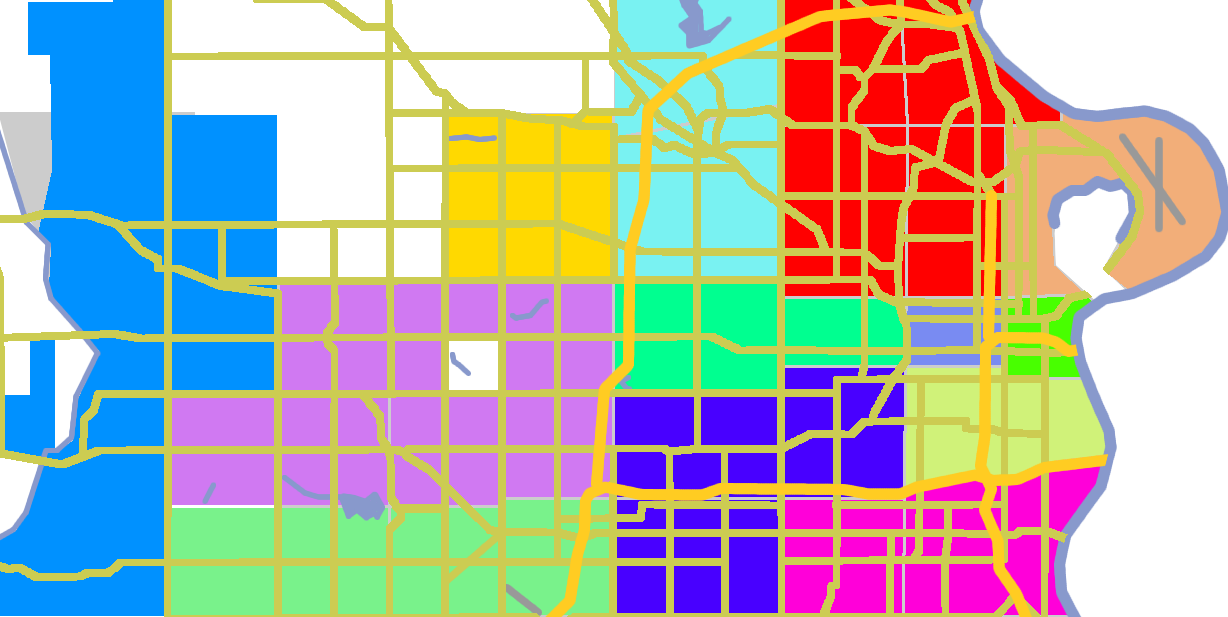
A map of the 6 community areas and several neighborhoods. The color groupings are unofficial, and such "areas" may be defined differently, grouped differently, or not be used at all. Community areas of Omaha, include Downtown-lime, East-peach, Midtown-blue-gray, North-red, South-pink, West-lavender

The city of Omaha is divided into 6 community areas for statistical and planning purposes. Census data and other statistics are tied to the areas, which serve as the basis for a variety of urban planning initiatives on both the local and regional levels. The areas' boundaries do not generally change, allowing comparisons of statistics across time.

The areas are distinct from but related to the more numerous neighborhoods of Omaha; an area often corresponds to a neighborhood or encompasses several neighborhoods, but the areas do not always correspond to popular conceptions of the neighborhoods due to a number of factors including historical evolution and choices made by the creators of the areas. Other geographical divisions of Omaha exist.

== History ==
The usage of community areas in Omaha has remained largely informal since the city was formally established in 1856. As it was the site of the city's founding in 1854, the area of Downtown Omaha emerged first and was quickly followed by North Omaha and East Omaha. Distinct from the rest of the community areas in Omaha, South Omaha began as a separate city when it was founded by real estate speculators in 1884. As it grew, there were neighborhoods established. When it was annexed by the City of Omaha in 1917, the community area had several distinct neighborhoods. While some of their identities have diminished in the last century, the region of South Omaha is largely distinct from the rest of Omaha in 2025. Other areas that have unfolded since include West Omaha and Midtown Omaha, which was carved from existent areas in North Omaha and Downtown Omaha in the early 2000s.

== Use and reception ==
The areas are used for statistical and planning purposes by such professions as assessors, charities, and reporters. Shortly after their development they were used for all kinds of statistics, including movie theater distribution and juvenile delinquency. The areas do not always correspond to popular imagination of the neighborhoods. For example, the Florence, Old Market and Little Italy neighborhoods are as well known as their respective community areas, North Omaha and Downtown Omaha.

== List of community areas ==
There are 6 community areas in Omaha.

Community areas in Omaha alphabetical order
Name	Boundaries	Notes
Downtown Omaha	20th Street on the west to the Missouri River on the east, and Leavenworth Street on the south to Cuming Street on the north, including NoDo and the Riverfront	
East Omaha	The Missouri River on the east, the Carter Lake and Carter Lake, Iowa on the south, and Florence Boulevard from Jaynes Street north to Read Street on the west.	Omaha's first annexation, in 1854.
Midtown Omaha	Cuming Street on the north, Center Street on the south, 24th Street on the east, and 72nd Street on the west.	
North Omaha	Dodge Street on the south, I-680 on the north, 72nd Street to the west, and East Omaha and Carter Lake, Iowa to the east	
South Omaha	Center Street on the north, Harrison Street on the south, the Missouri River on the east, and 72nd Street on the west	
West Omaha	Traditionally all areas of Omaha west of 72nd Street, but by the early 21st century 72nd Street to I-680 is often considered Central Omaha	

The community areas of Omaha include several surrounding towns in addition to the city, such as Bennington, Waterloo, Valley, Papillion, Ralston, and Bellevue. There are other community areas included in the Omaha–Council Bluffs metropolitan area.

== See also ==
- Neighborhoods of Omaha, Nebraska
- Omaha, Nebraska
