= Drake Court Apartments and the Dartmore Apartments Historic District =

Historic district in Nebraska, United States

- Drake Court Historic District
- U.S. National Register of Historic Places
- U.S. Historic district
- Omaha Landmark
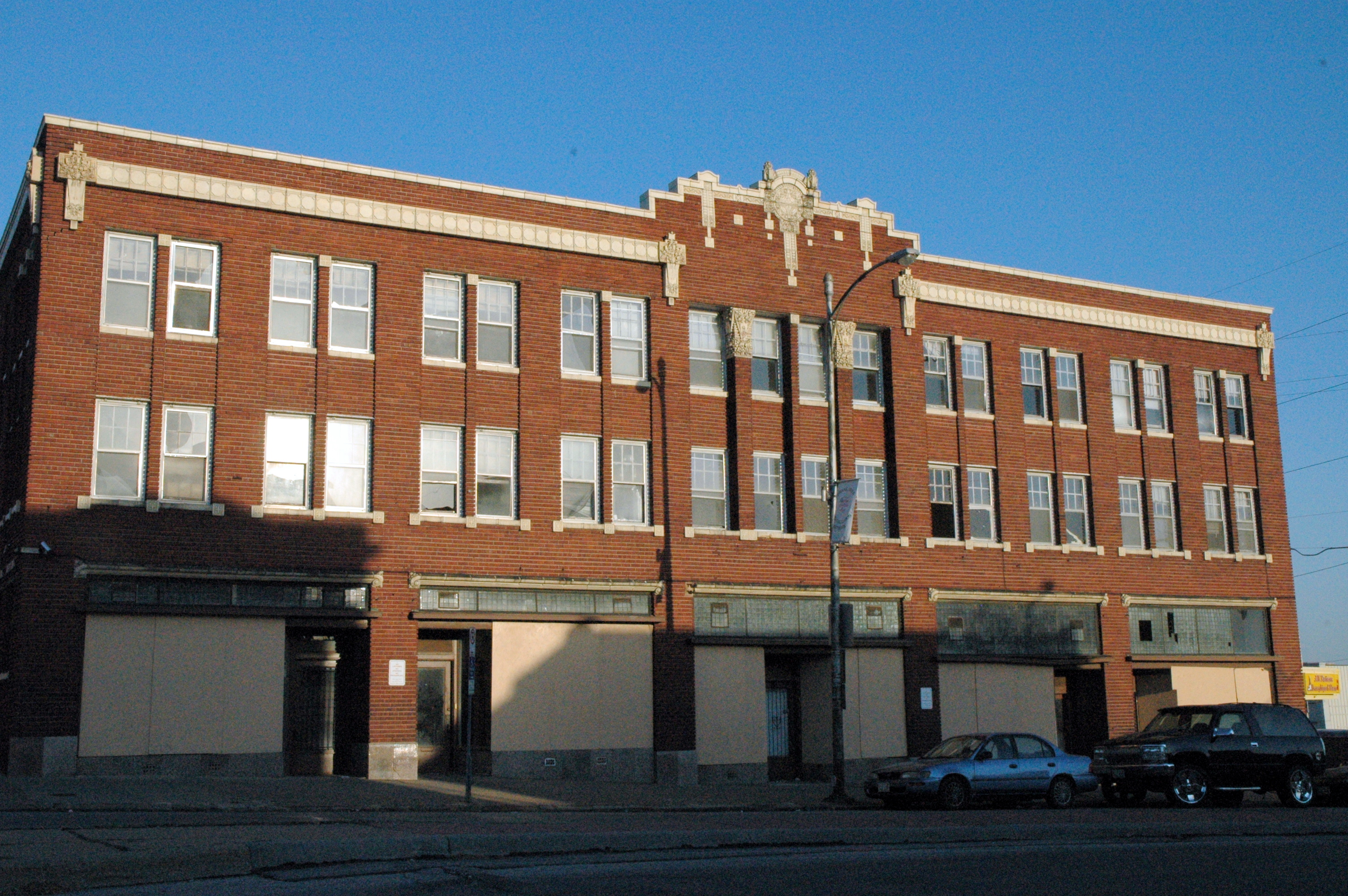
- The Ansonia Apartments at 2221–2223 Jones Street are part of the historic district

- Location within Nebraska Location within the United States
- Location: Omaha, Nebraska
- Coordinates: 41°15′11.52″N 95°56′36.86″W
- Built: 1916–1921
- Architect: William B. Drake; Drake Realty Construction Co.
- Architectural style: Colonial Revival, Prairie School
- NRHP reference No.: 80002447 (original); 14000258 (increase); 14000258 (decrease)

Significant dates
- Added to NRHP: November 10, 1980
- Boundary increase: June 4, 2014
- Boundary decrease: June 4, 2014
- Designated OMAL: December 19, 1978

The Drake Court Apartments and the Dartmore Apartments Historic District, built between 1916 and 1921, is located at Jones Street from 20th to 23rd Streets in Midtown Omaha, in the U.S. state of Nebraska. Built in combined Georgian Revival, Colonial Revival and Prairie School styles, the complex was designated a City of Omaha Landmark in 1978; it was listed on the National Register of Historic Places as a historic district in 1980. The historic district originally included 6.5 acres (2.6 ha) with 19 buildings. In 2014, boundary of the historic district was expanded by 0.74 acres (0.30 ha) include three additional buildings, and decreased by 3 acres (1.2 ha) to remove open space and parking that had been re-purposed, for a new total of 4.24 acres (1.72 ha). The district was also renamed to Drake Court Historic District.

== About ==
Located in the formerly affluent and prosperous mixed-use neighborhood west of downtown Omaha, the Drake Court Apartments and the Dartmore Apartments were built between 1916 and 1921 by William B. Drake, a prolific builder who held more than four million dollars' worth of apartments throughout Omaha in 1925. These particular buildings were built in both Georgian Revival and Prairie School styles. With landscaped grounds, marble floors in a number of units and a surrounding park-like atmosphere scattered throughout a mixed-use neighborhood, Drake Court was once a highly desired property.

Other buildings in the historic district include the Monroe Apartment Building, built in 1920. A four-story structure, it was rehabilitated in 1987. The Madison Apartments, built in 1927, were rehabilitated in 1985.

Three buildings were added in the 2014 expansion, the Ansonia, Ainsworth, and Beverly Apartments.

== See also ==
- History of Omaha, Nebraska
