= Spring Lake (Omaha, Nebraska) =

Historic neighborhood in Omaha, Nebraska

Coordinates: 41°13′13″N 95°56′19″W

Spring Lake is a historic neighborhood in Omaha, Nebraska. It is bounded by I-80 on the north, Missouri Avenue on the south, Highway 75 on the west and the Missouri River on the east. Spring Lake Park is also the name of an area park originally established as Syndicate Park. Spring Lake is bordered by the Deer Park neighborhood on the north and the city of Bellevue on the south.

== Spring Lake places ==
Early on the site that became Spring Lake Park was called "Syndicate Park". It belonged to the Livestock Syndicate, a business coalition formed to create the livestock sale and meat processing industry in South Omaha, which was a small city in its own right. The park was designed as a private park for the employees and residents of the area. When the City of Omaha annexed South Omaha in 1915, the park fell into city hands. A former dairy farm was converted into the original Spring Lake golf course in 1933. The city acquired Begley farm ravine south of the original park and it was converted into a municipal dump in 1960. The resulting landfill area was added to Spring Lake Park. Spring Lake Magnet School and Spring Lake Public Swimming Pool are also located within the neighborhood.

In the late 1990s the leaders of the Spring Lake Neighborhood Association (SLNA), Janet Bonet* and Kris (Larsen)Sandoval, formed the Spring Lake Park Habitat Restoration and Preservation Team and spearheaded a grant-writing effort for funding from the Nebraska Environmental Trust. As a result of that effort, three grants were obtained to bring together park neighbors and city officials to create conceptual designs for a large water feature in the park. Professor Wigfall of the Kansas State University Landscape Architecture Program and the University of Nebraska at Lincoln Water Resources Division assisted in creating the basic plan and triggered a City of Omaha feasibility study. There is currently a community motivated action to reestablish the lake in Spring Lake Park. The Clean Solutions for Omaha program, a government funded program for helping Omaha comply with the US Clean Water Act by separating storm and waste water discharges into public waterways, is carrying out design and engineering requirements for a project that will allow for storm water retention features in Spring Lake Park that incorporate wetlands, natural springs and ponds that will be available for public access and wildlife habitat.

== See also ==
- Neighborhoods in Omaha, Nebraska
