= Thomas Kilpatrick House =

Historic house in Nebraska, United States

- Garneau–Kilpatrick House
- U.S. National Register of Historic Places
- Omaha Landmark
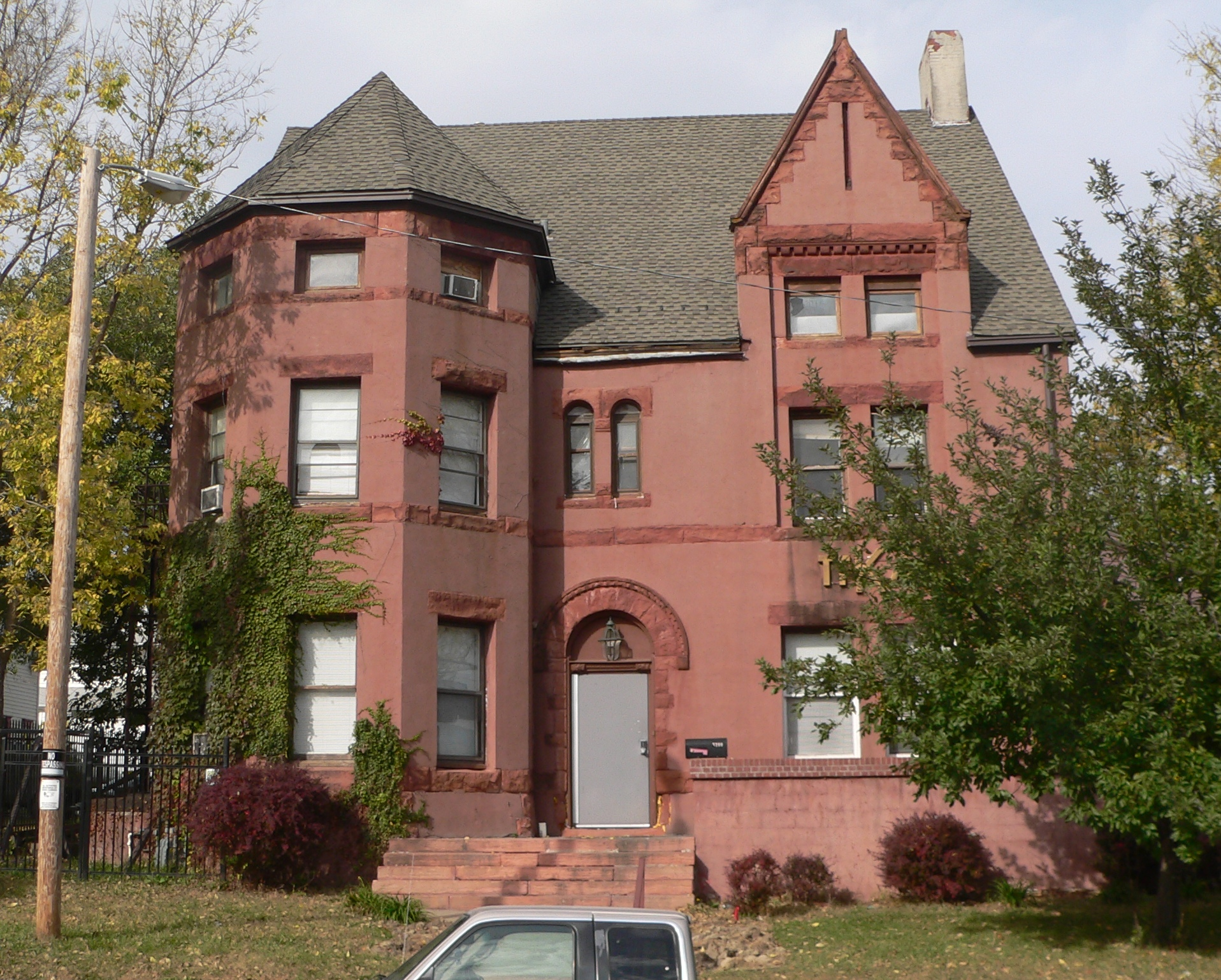
- South (front) of house; seen from Chicago Street

- Location within Nebraska Location within the United States
- Location: 3100 Chicago St., Omaha, Nebraska
- Coordinates: 41°15′45″N 95°57′31″W
- Area: less than one acre
- Built: 1890
- Architectural style: Romanesque, Richardsonian Romanesque
- NRHP reference No.: 82000602

Significant dates
- Added to NRHP: October 07, 1982
- Designated OMAL: January 22, 1980

The Joseph Garneau Jr. House, later called the Thomas Kilpatrick House or the Garneau–Kilpatrick House, is located at 3100 Chicago Street in the Gifford Park neighborhood of Omaha, Nebraska, United States. Built in 1890 for cracker magnate Joseph Garneau Jr., it changed hands in 1903 when Garneau moved to New York City to set up a wine importing business. Thomas Kilpatrick lived in the house until his death in 1916.

The Romanesque Revival style of the house led to it be designated an Omaha Landmark in 1980; it was listed on the National Register of Historic Places in 1981. The house has served many purposes over the years, including apartment style living at one point. It is currently rented out to tenants that attend Creighton University.

== See also ==
- History of Omaha
- Neighborhoods of Omaha, Nebraska
