= Burlington Road neighborhood =

Neighborhood in Omaha, Nebraska

Coordinates: 41°13′11″N 95°57′58″W

Burlington Road
- Neighborhood
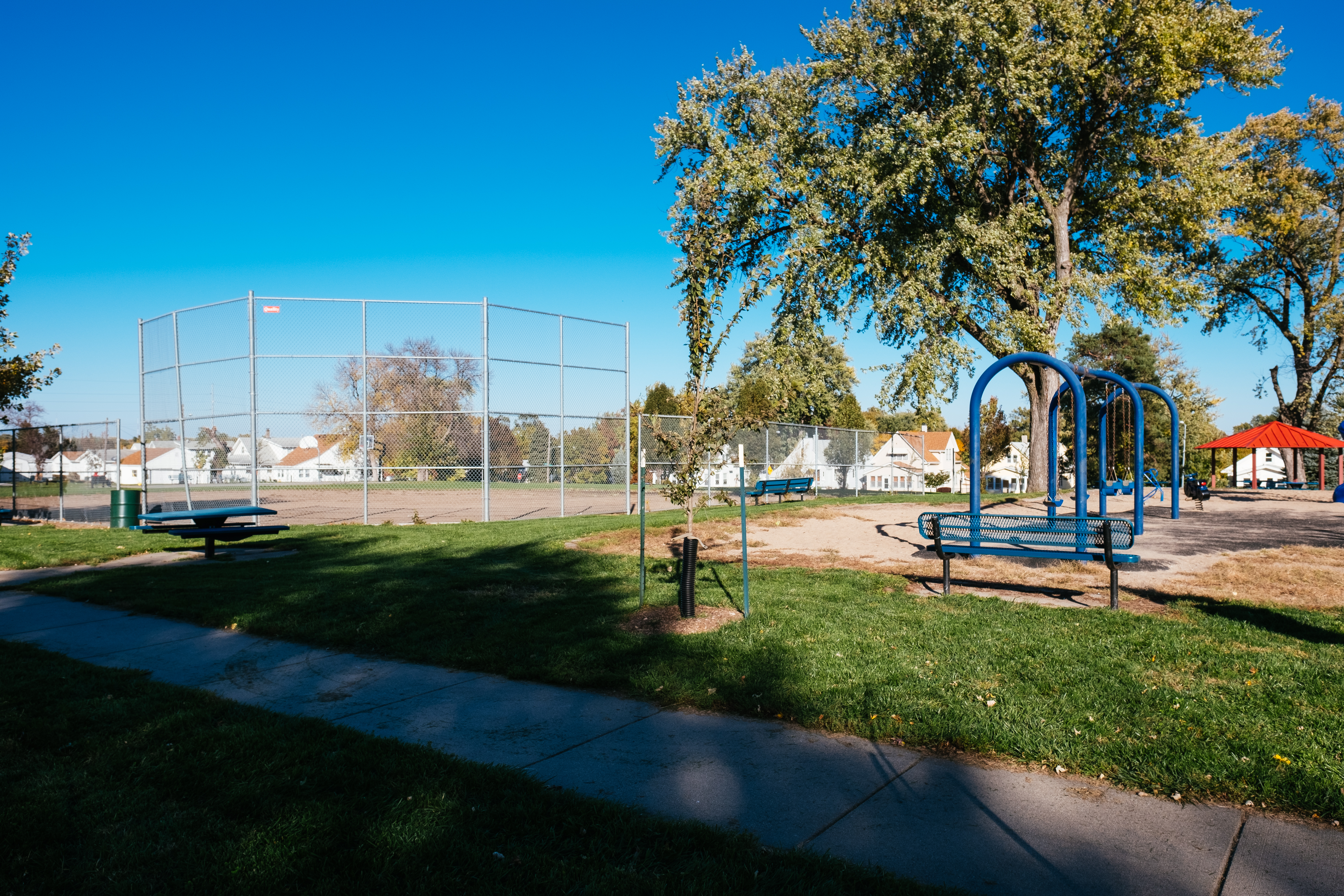
- Pulaski Park
- Interactive map of Burlington Road
- Country: United States
- State: Nebraska
- City: Omaha
- Website: Official website

The Burlington Road neighborhood of Omaha, Nebraska is bordered by South 42nd Street on the west, L Street on the south, Interstate 80 on the north and Dahlman Avenue on the east. Once incorporated in the City of South Omaha, the area has also been known as Golden Hill in the past.

== History ==
The community has a long history of welcoming immigrants, including large populations of Polish, Greeks, Czechs, and Mexicans. "The early part of the century, it was known that every block had its own store grocery store and a bar for the men of the area." The neighborhood is named after the Burlington Railroad tracks that border the eastern edge of the area.

== See also ==
- History of Omaha
- Neighborhoods of Omaha
