= Fairacres Historic District =

Historic district in Nebraska, United States

- U.S. National Register of Historic Places
- U.S. Historic district
- Location within Nebraska Location within the United States
- Location: Omaha, Nebraska
- Coordinates: 41.262°N 96.013°W
- NRHP reference No.: 100001353
- Added to NRHP: July 24, 2017

Fairacres is a neighborhood and historic district in Omaha, Nebraska. It is south of Dundee and west of Midtown. It is roughly bounded by Underwood Avenue to the north, Dodge Street to the south, North 69th Street to the west, and North 62nd Street to the east. It is primarily residential, and was annexed into Omaha in 1941. It was listed the National Register of Historic Places in 2017.

== History ==
In 1907, real estate investors Charles C. and J.E George from Dundee Realty contacted the architect George Kessler to construct a suburb of Omaha. This suburb was planned to be four miles away from the downtown via Dodge and Douglas Streets with an automobile. This suburb was made for the wealthy with automobiles to commute to and from work from downtown.

The land was bought by the Georges in 1907 and developed between 1907 and 1915. Fairacres started with the development of Fairacres Road and kept on steadily pushing out toward Underwood Avenue and Dodge Street. Fairacres Road was completed in around 1910 and the lots kept on being built.

World War II stopped the development of the lots, but were built up again until 1961, when all of the empty lots were filled. In 1941, the suburb village was annexed into the CIty of Omaha.

It was listed on the National Register of Historic Places in 2017.
