= Field Club (Omaha, Nebraska) =

Historic district in Omaha, Nebraska, United States

- Field Club Historic District
- U.S. National Register of Historic Places
- U.S. Historic district
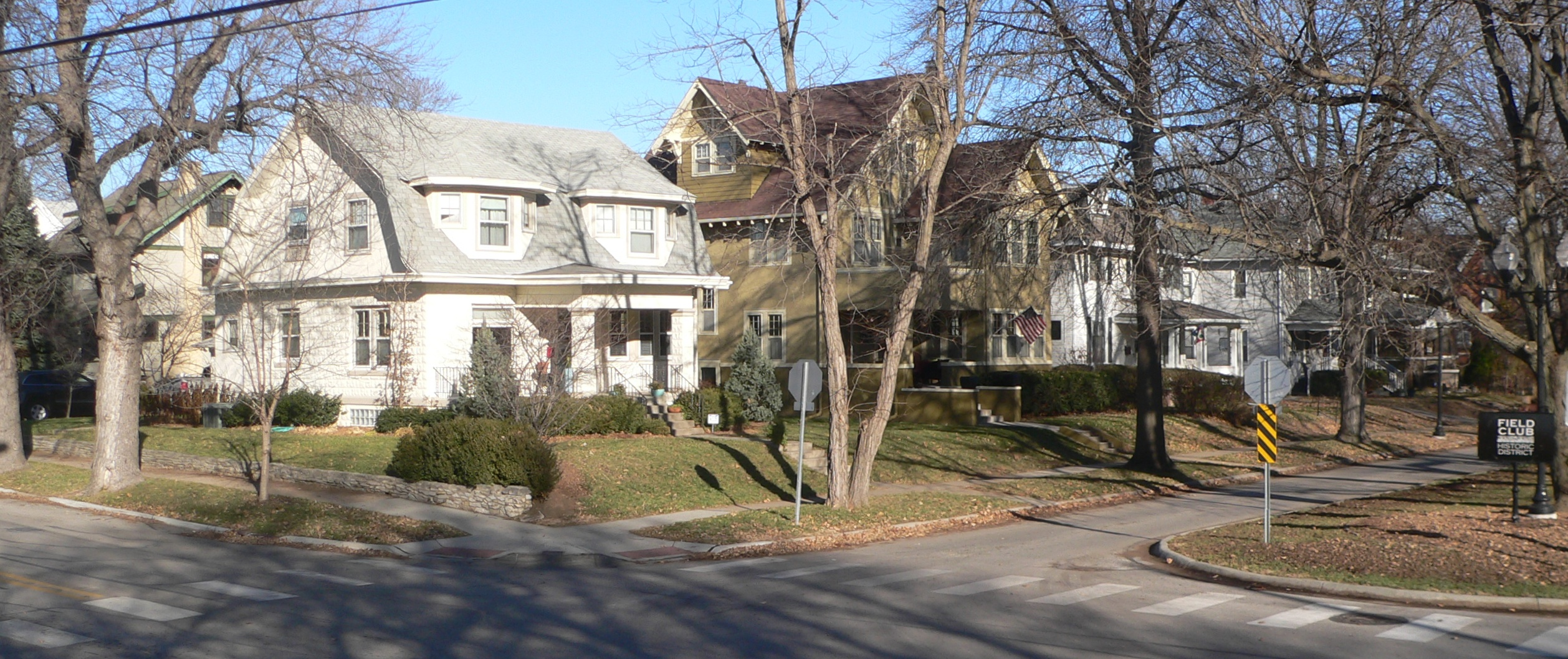
- Northeast corner of 36th Street and Woolworth Avenue

- Location within Nebraska Location within the United States
- Location: Omaha, Nebraska
- Coordinates: 41°14′43″N 95°57′50″W
- Architect: John McDonald, et al.
- Architectural style: Late Victorian, Late 19th And 20th Century Revivals
- NRHP reference No.: 00001380
- Added to NRHP: November 15, 2000

Field Club is an affluent and historic neighborhood located in the Midtown region of Omaha, Nebraska. Roughly bounded by Pacific Street, 32nd Avenue, Center St., and 36th Street, the neighborhood was placed on the National Register of Historic Places as a historic district on November 15, 2000. Field Club is the location of dozens of historically significant homes in the Omaha area, including the Gerald R. Ford Birthsite and Gardens.

== History ==
In its earlier years, Field Club was a late 19th-century suburb located at the southwest boundaries of Omaha. It was connected to the city center by the new trolley system which made it a convenient place to live for the well-to-do of the time. It was a highly desirable area, as it was plotted between two developed green sites. The first of these green areas, east of the neighborhood, was Hanscom Park, Omaha's first city park, which was founded in 1872. Hanscom Park was named for early Omaha attorney Andrew Jackson Hanscom, influential in the battle to secure Omaha as the territorial capital. He was a major donor of land that became that park. The second site, located on the west, was the Omaha Field Club. Founded in 1900, it was Omaha's first country club and golf course, and is the namesake of the neighborhood.

By the turn of the 20th century, many of Omaha's most noteworthy citizens had houses designed and built in the district by many prominent architects of the time. These houses have been well preserved over the last hundred-plus years. In the late 1990s, a local historian named Edward J. Quinn began the research to get the neighborhood listed on the National Register of Historic Places with the support of the Field Club Homeowners League and the Nebraska State Historical Society. The Field Club Historic District was listed in 2000. For his work, in 2001 Mayor Fahey appointed Quinn to sit on the City of Omaha Landmarks Heritage Preservation Commission, and in 2007 Quinn was honored for his efforts by the Douglas County Historical Society.

The Omaha Quartermaster Depot Historic District lies just east of the neighborhood.

== See also ==
- Neighborhoods of Omaha, Nebraska
