= Blackstone Hotel (Omaha, Nebraska) =

Building in Omaha, Nebraska

- U.S. National Register of Historic Places
- Omaha Landmark
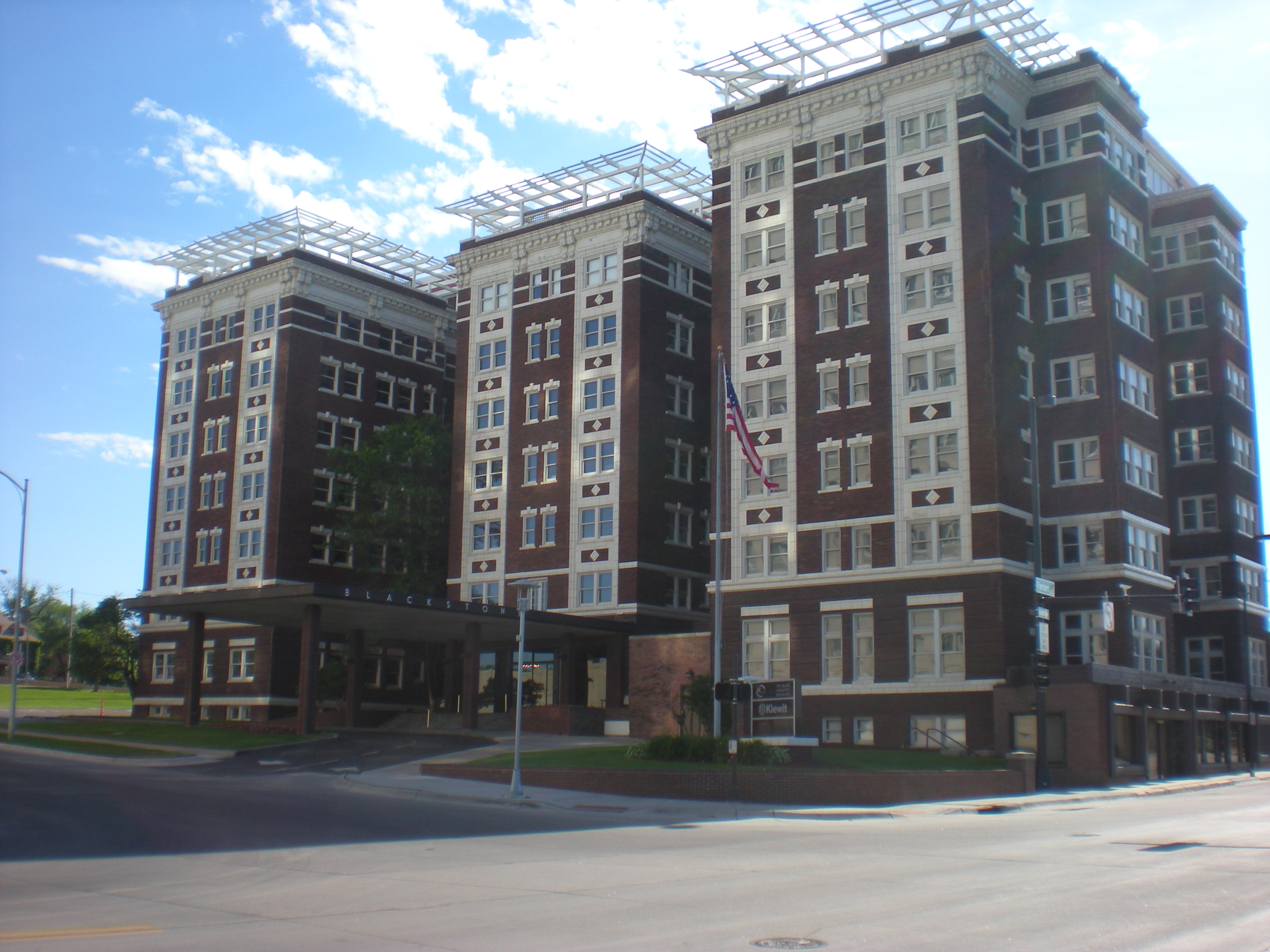
- Front view of the Blackstone; 2010

- Location within Nebraska Location within the United States
- Interactive map showing the location of Blackstone Hotel
- Location: 302 S. 36th St., Omaha, Nebraska
- Coordinates: 41°15′26″N 95°57′59″W
- Area: 1.5 acres (0.61 ha)
- Built: 1916
- Architect: F.W. Fitzpatrick
- Architectural style: Late 19th And 20th Century Revivals, Second Renaissance Revival
- NRHP reference No.: 85000067

Significant dates
- Added to NRHP: January 11, 1985
- Designated OMAL: April 12, 1983

The Blackstone Hotel is a historic hotel located at 302 South 36th Street in the Blackstone neighborhood of the Midtown area in Omaha, Nebraska. Built in 1915, it was declared an Omaha Landmark in 1983 and listed on the National Register of Historic Places in 1985.

== History ==
The Blackstone was built by the Bankers Realty Investment Company as a residential hotel in 1915. Residents generally rented by the year rather than the day and received hotel services. Although there were single room units, most were suites with six to eight rooms. Each floor had four glass sunrooms and ornate furnishings throughout.

In 1920, the building was purchased by Charles Schimmel, an immigrant from Vienna. After converting the Blackstone to a regular hotel, it soon became a "symbol of elegance" and gained a high stature nationwide as the premier hotel between Chicago and San Francisco along the Lincoln Highway. Among its amenities, the hotel published its own magazine, The Blackstonian, and kept a small fleet of Pierce-Arrow limousines for visiting dignitaries who arrived in Omaha by train. There were also a ballroom, rooftop gardens, and award-winning restaurants. The Orleans Room was the Blackstone's most famous restaurant; it received Holiday Magazine's "Award for Excellence" for 16 straight years. Through the 1970s the building was one of the most successful elegant small hotels in the country.

In 1968, the Radisson Hotel Corporation bought the hotel and operated it until 1976. The Blackstone was renovated for use as offices in 1984 and renamed the Blackstone Center.

In September 2007, Kiewit Corporation, one of five Fortune 500 companies based in Omaha, bought the Blackstone. Kiewit sold the property in 2017 to local investors Clarity Development Co. and Green Slate Development, who restored it as a luxury hotel, at a cost of $75 million. It opened in November 2020 as the Kimpton Cottonwood Hotel, operated by the Kimpton Hotel & Restaurant Group The original name can no longer be used due to legal issues.

== Construction ==
Built on a steel frame, the building is covered in brick with terra cotta detailing.

== Legacy ==
The Reuben sandwich was likely invented in Omaha by Bernard Schimmel for local grocer Reuben Kulakofsky. According to one version of the sandwich's disputed history, it was first introduced to the world in 1925 on a menu in one of the Blackstone's restaurants. Butter brickle ice cream was also first introduced to the world at the Blackstone.

== See also ==
- National Register of Historic Places listings in Douglas County, Nebraska
