= Omaha Children's Museum =

Children's Museum in Omaha, Nebraska, U.S.

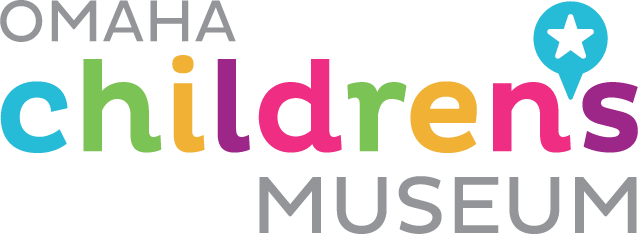

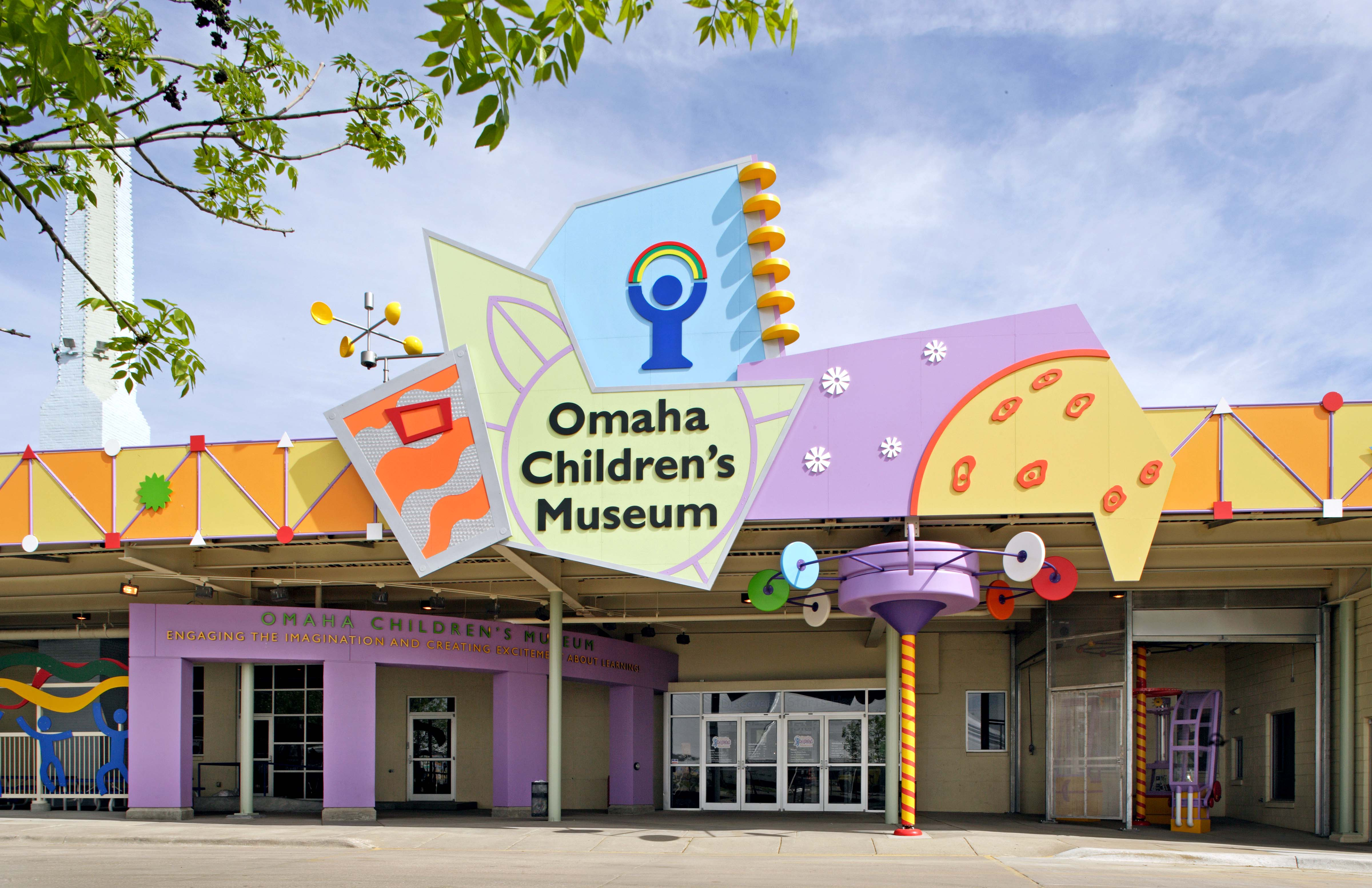
- The museum in 2011
- Established: 1977
- Location: 500 S 20th St., Downtown Omaha, Nebraska, U.S.
- Coordinates: 41.2552400551534°N 95.94293469755203°W
- Type: Children's museum
- Website: ocm.org

The Omaha Children's Museum is a nonprofit children's museum located at 500 South 20th Street in Downtown Omaha, Nebraska, United States. The museum has ten permanent exhibits and also includes many temporary exhibits called, "special exhibits." The museum was founded in 1977, originally located inside the Omaha/Douglas Civic Center. The museum later moved to many different locations until it moved to its current location in 1989.

The museum building was renovated from 1990 to 1993. The museum underwent a second renovation in 2004, adding the current awning and redesigning the exterior. The Omaha Children's Museum planned on building a new location near 8th and Douglas streets. However, it was later put on pause in 2025. The museum has received a national award from the Association of Science and Technology Museums.

== History ==
The Omaha Children's Museum was founded in 1977 and opened in 1978 in a temporary location inside the Omaha-Douglas Civic Center. The museum would later move to 551 S. 18th Street in 1980.

In 1989, the Omaha Children's Museum temporarily moved to the former Team One Ford Building at 20th and Howard Streets. In 1990, it was announced that the building would become the permanent home of the children's museum. Renovations to the building began shortly after, and the children's museum re-opened in July 1993.

In April 2005, a major renovation was announced for the children's museum, which would also add a new facade to the outside of the building. Renovations were completed in 2006, during the museum's 30th anniversary.

In October 2024, the Omaha Children's Museum announced that it would be moving to a new location near 8th and Douglas streets. If built, the new museum would have been four stories tall, contain an estimated 76,000 square feet (7,100 m^{2}) of space, and was expected to be completed by 2027. In November 2025, the museum announced that it was pausing the fundraising campaign and would refocus its efforts to the current location. This came to the surprise of NuStyle, who was developing the mass timber building known as the Beam in coordination with the museum.

== Exhibits ==
The Omaha Children's Museum contains ten permanent exhibits and several temporary exhibits, labeled as, "special exhibits." The permanent exhibits include the Imagination Playground, Charlie Campbell Science & Technology Center, Art Smart Center, Streck Science Showplace, S.T.E.A.M. Cave, Zoo Land, Bay Family Carousal, Susie's Station, Sandy's Splish-Splash Garden, and the Grass Patch. The most notable temporary exhibit, the Dinosaur Exhibit from 1989, was the most visited exhibit at the museum in its history.

== See also ==
- Culture in Omaha
