= Garneau (surname) =

== Origin ==
The Garneau family originally derived its surname from the seigneury of Garneau in the region of Poitou. In France, hereditary surnames were adopted according to fairly general rules and during the late Middle Ages, names that were derived from localities became increasingly widespread. Local names often denoted the proprietorship of a village or estate; in other instances they indicated where a person had moved from.

The surname Garneau was first found in Poitou where they held a family seat in the honor of the seigneury of Garneau in the region of Saintonge in the diocese of Saintes in the parliament of Bordeaux.

Spelling variations include: Garnaud, Garnault, Garneau, Garneault, Garineau, Garinaud, Garino, Garinois, Garinot, Garnot, Garnoux, Le Garnaud, Legarnaud, Le Garnault, Legarnault, Le Garneau and many more.

== Notable people ==
- Chris Garneau (born 1982), American singer-songwriter
- Dustin Garneau (born 1987), American baseball player
- Francois Xavier Garneau, (1809–66) French Canadian historian
- Louis Garneau, Canadian cyclist
- Marc Garneau (1949–2025), Canadian astronaut and politician
- Richard Garneau (1930–2013), Canadian sports journalist and writer
