= Mary Rogers Kimball House =

Historic house in Nebraska, United States

- U.S. National Register of Historic Places
- Omaha Landmark
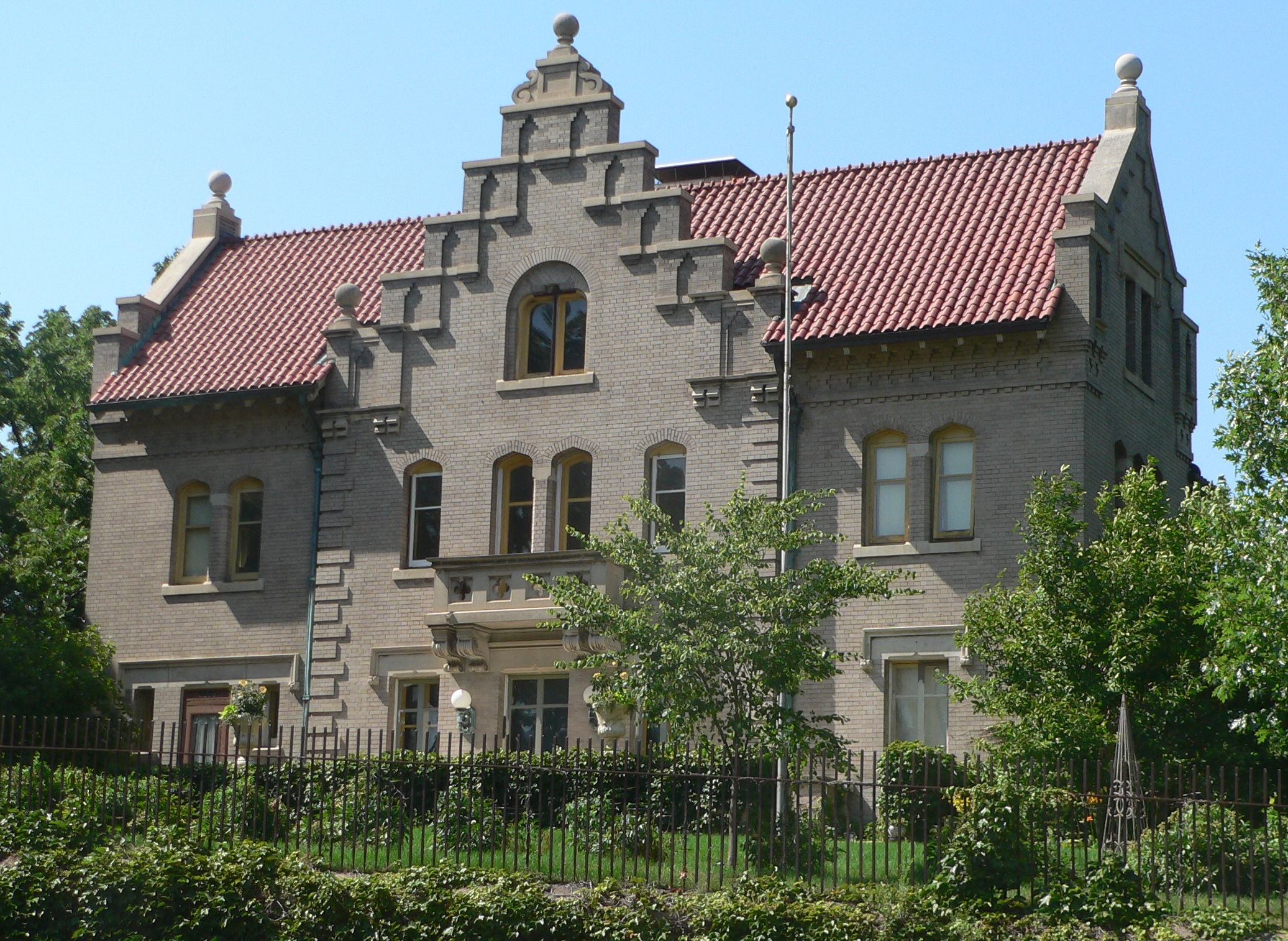
- View from the south, across St. Mary's

- Location within Nebraska Location within the United States
- Location: Omaha, Nebraska
- Coordinates: 41°15′15.6″N 95°56′46″W
- Built: 1906; 120 years ago
- Architect: Kimball, Thomas Rogers; Parrish, Wallace H.
- Architectural style: Late 19th And 20th Century Revivals
- NRHP reference No.: 96000765

Significant dates
- Added to NRHP: July 19, 1996; 30 years ago
- Designated OMAL: April 2, 1996; 30 years ago

The Mary Rogers Kimball House, also known as the Kimball House, is located at 2236 St. Mary's Avenue in Downtown Omaha, Nebraska.

It is an official Omaha City Landmark and also is listed on the National Register of Historic Places. It was designed by Thomas Rogers Kimball.
