= Midtown Crossing at Turner Park =

Mixed-use development in Omaha, Nebraska

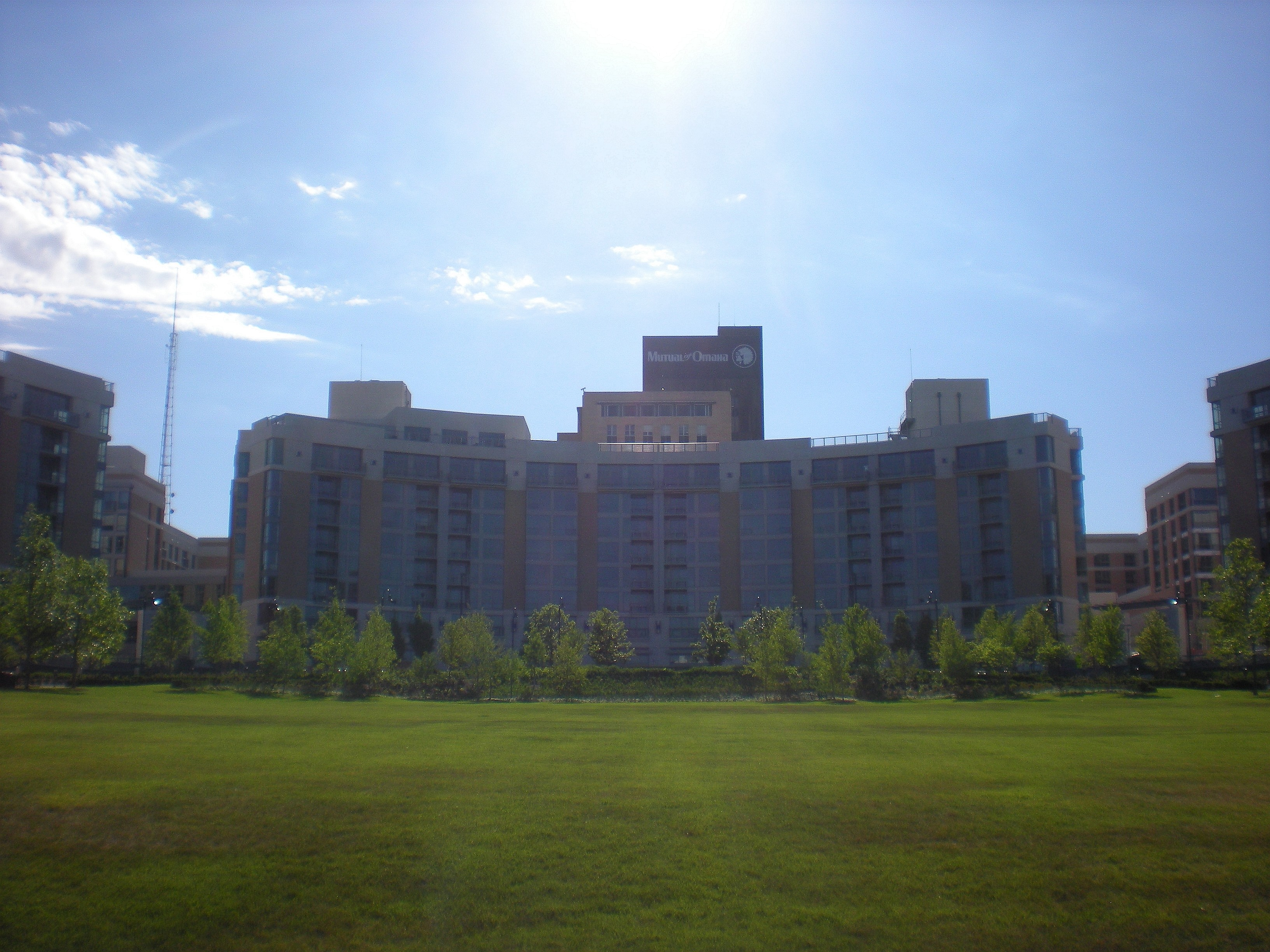
- Condos in Midtown Crossing in 2010
- Interactive map of the Midtown Crossing at Turner Park area
- Alternative names: Midtown Crossing

General information
- Status: Completed
- Location: Omaha, Nebraska, U.S.
- Coordinates: 41.25830641676946°N 95.96022209485794°W
- Opening: May 19, 2010

Design and construction
- Architects: Holland Basham Architects & Cope Linder Architects
- Developer: ECI Investment Advisors
- Structural engineer: Nielsen-Baumert Engineering
- Main contractor: Weitz

Midtown Crossing at Turner Park, commonly referred to as Midtown Crossing, is a mixed-use development in Midtown Omaha, Nebraska, United States. The 16-acre seven-building development hosts more than 30 retail and office tenants, 297 condominiums, 196 apartment units, and the Turner Park. The development was announced in 2006 and opened on May 19, 2010. The neighborhood sits between Farnam and Dodge Streets and 31st and 33rd Streets, East of the Blackstone District and West of downtown Omaha.

== History ==
In October 2006, Mutual of Omaha announced that it would be building a $250 million mixed-use development known as Midtown Crossing. Demolition began shortly after and ground was officially broken in September 2007. In July 2008, it was announced that Marcus Theatres would take over theater operations. The parking garage was completed in the Fall of 2008. The mid-rise buildings were topped-out by February 2009. Midtown Crossing officially opened on May 19, 2010.

In the years following Midtown Crossings opening, many buildings have been demolished to make the area more desirable for development. The North Tower of the then-Twin Towers Condos was demolished in 2013, excluding the parking garage. In 2014, the Clarinda & Page Building had its historic status revoked by the Omaha City Council and was then demolished as well. In 2016, Midtown Crossing added two murals, "Turner Park," and "Eastbound Zeppelins".

In 2022, it was announced that Mutual of Omaha would be building a new headquarters in Downtown Omaha. With moving out of Midtown Omaha, Mutual of Omaha would step away from developing the property. During the construction of Omaha Streetcar in the 2025, many businesses in Midtown Crossing reported declining sales due to construction.

== See also ==
- History of Omaha
- Midtown Omaha
