= Country Club Historic District (Omaha, Nebraska) =

Historic district in Nebraska, United States

Coordinates: 41°16′53″N 95°59′50″W

- U.S. National Register of Historic Places
- U.S. Historic district
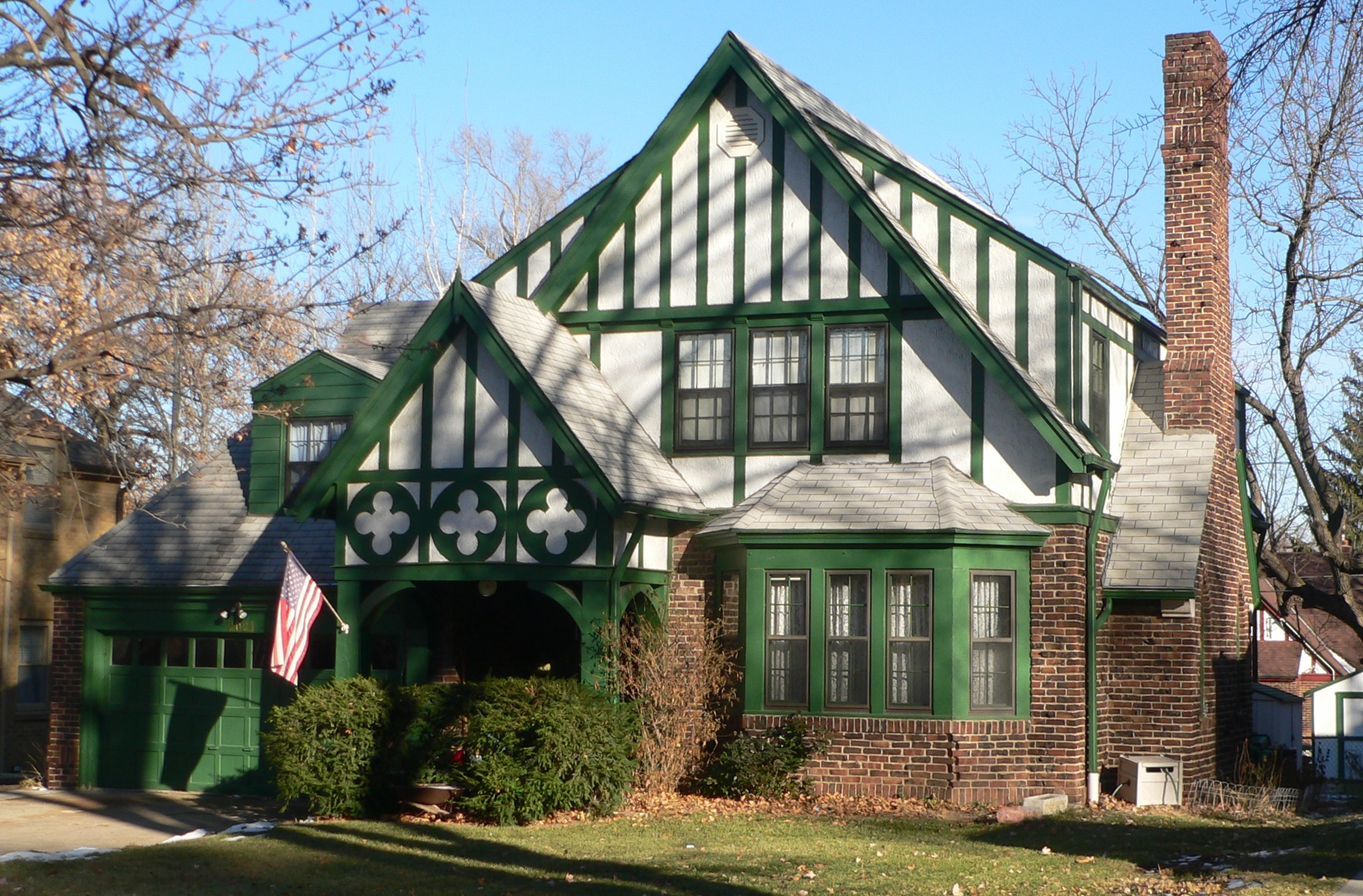
- Tudor Revival house in district

- Location within Nebraska Location within the United States
- Location: Omaha, Nebraska
- Architectural style: Late 19th And 20th Century Revivals
- NRHP reference No.: 04001410
- Added to NRHP: December 30, 2004

The Country Club Historic District is located in Omaha, Nebraska from 50th to 56th Streets and from Corby to Seward Streets. It includes dozens of homes built between 1925 and 1949 in the late 19th and 20th Century Revival styles. It was added to the National Register of Historic Places in 2004.

According to the district's National Register of Historic Places nomination, "the Country Club Historic District is significant as an early 20th century Omaha subdivision that was planned and marketed to attract homebuyers who expected an exceptionally high level of quality and consistency in neighborhood layout, amenities, home design, and environment. The district has a large concentration and variety of fine period revival houses, many of them designed by local architects."

== See also ==
- Neighborhoods of Omaha, Nebraska
