= Omaha Quartermaster Depot Historic District =

Historic district in Nebraska, United States

- U.S. National Register of Historic Places
- U.S. Historic district
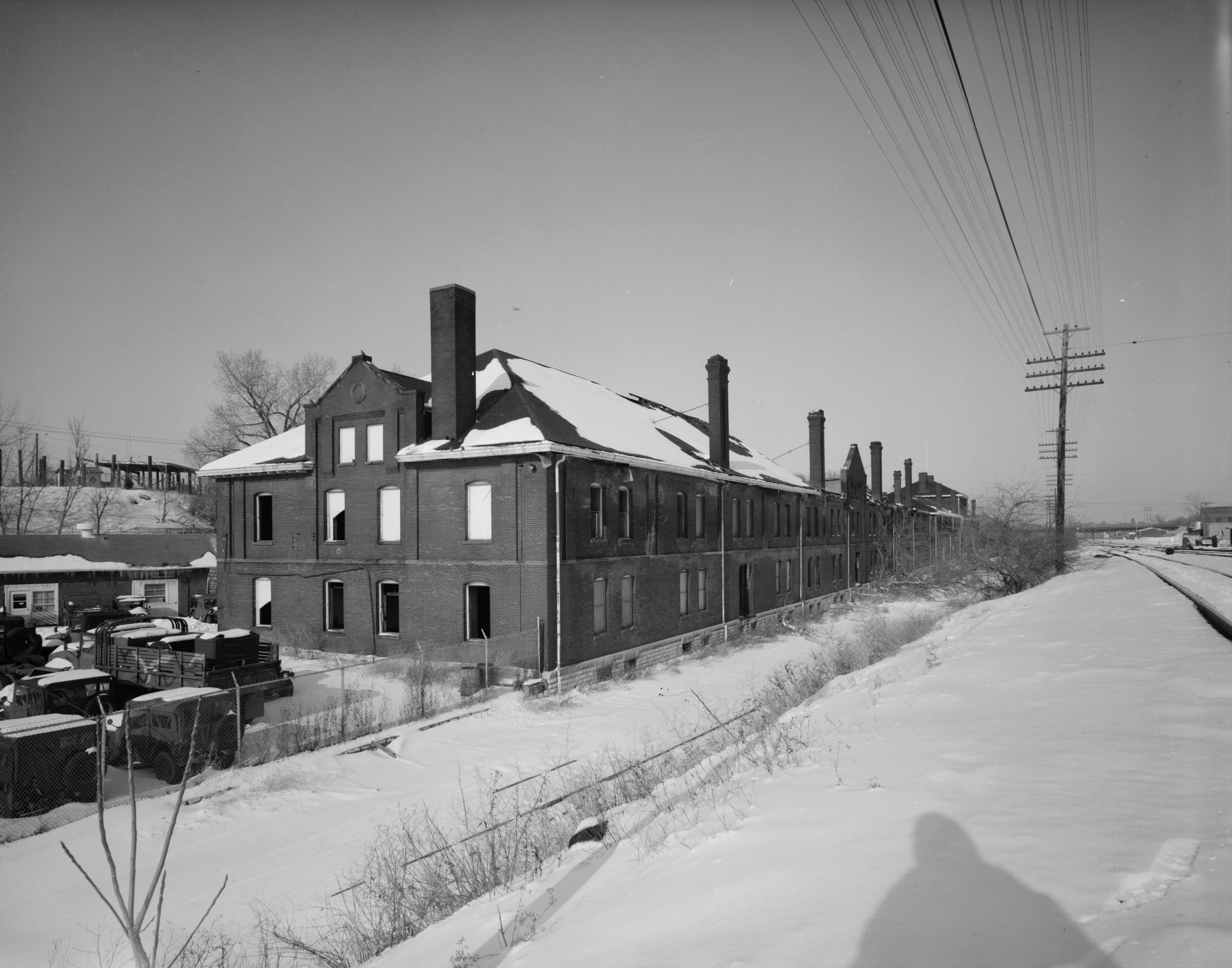
- Exterior of the depot

- Location within Nebraska Location within the United States
- Location: Omaha, Nebraska
- Coordinates: 41°14′39.45″N 95°56′35.85″W
- Architectural style: Italianate
- NRHP reference No.: 79003685
- Added to NRHP: July 26, 1979

The Omaha Quartermaster Depot Historic District, including several brick structures built in Italianate and other styles, was built for the U.S. Army between 1881 and 1894. Located in South Omaha between Hickory and 22nd Streets, Woolworth Avenue and the Union Pacific Railroad main line in Omaha, Nebraska, the depot was listed on the National Register of Historic Places as a historic district in 1979. The depot previously operated as United States Army Reserve facility. The facility is considered surplus by the GSA and was put up for auction in the fall of 2013.

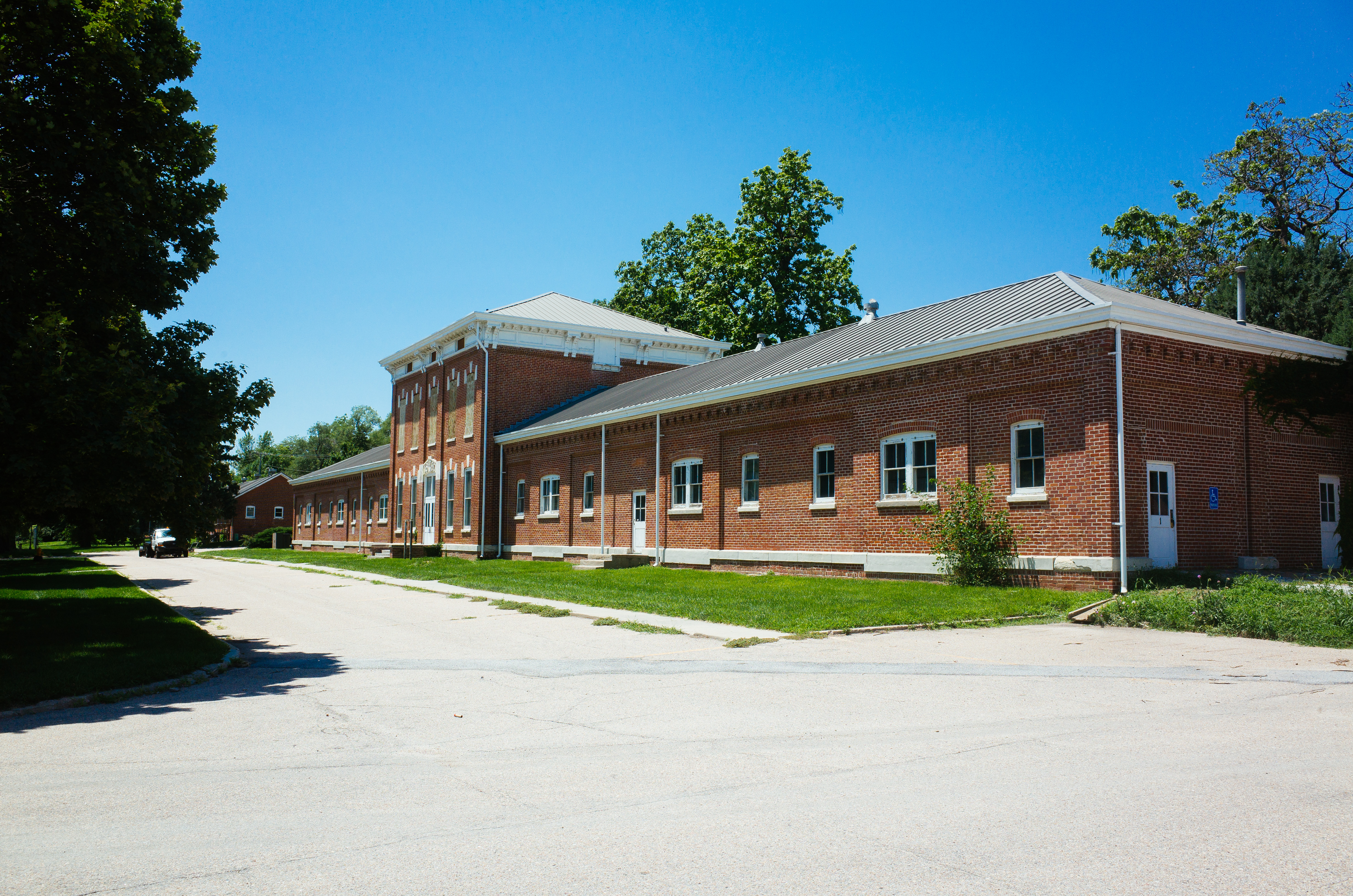

== History ==
In 1892, the depot commissary from Fort Leavenworth, Kansas, moved to Omaha. The U.S. Army's Department of the Platte used the depot as a storage and distribution source for military outposts for 20 years, including its peak activity during World War I. During that period, the depot supplied camps and National Guard units throughout the Midwest.

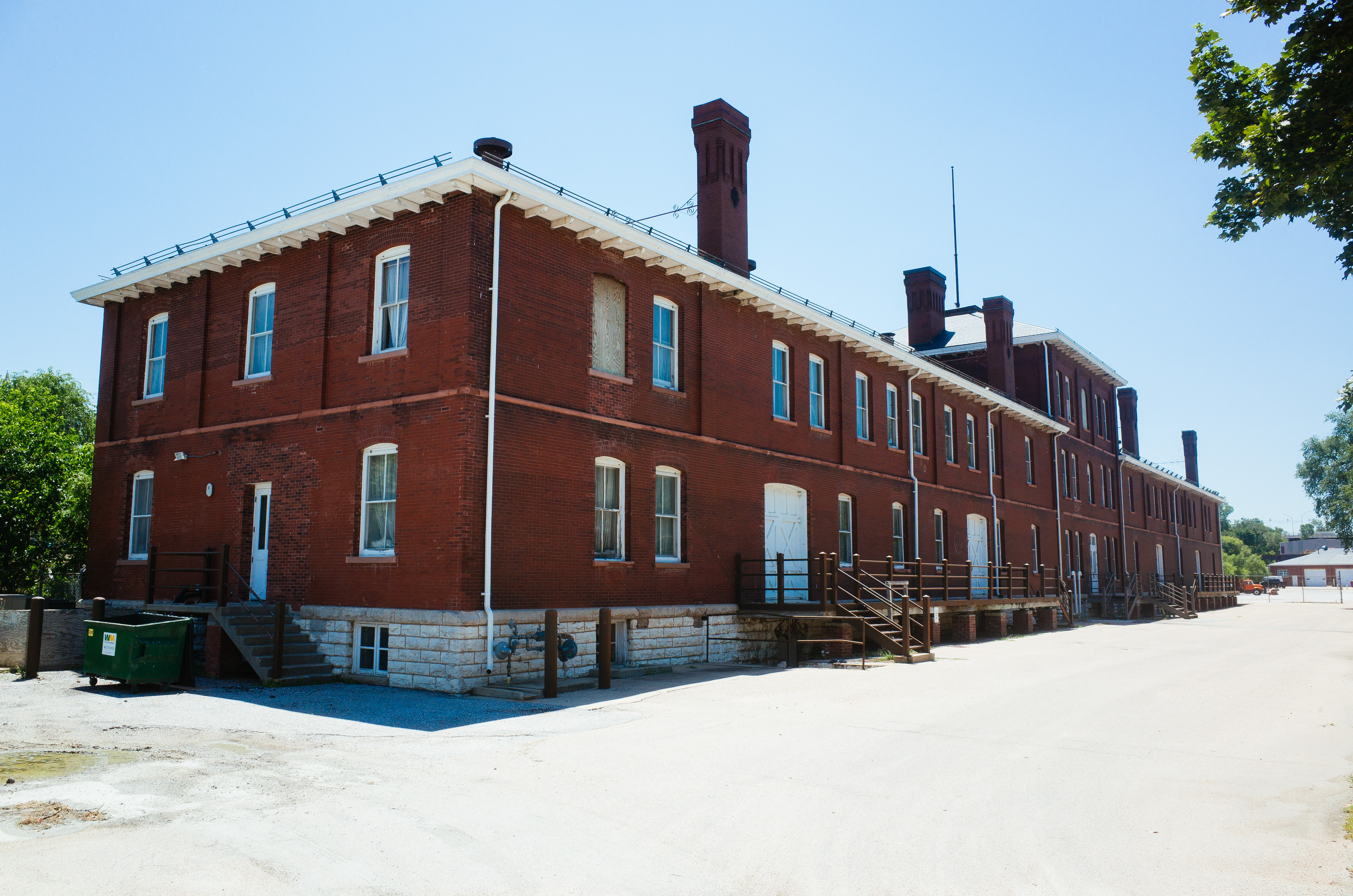
Depot

During the Great Depression, the depot was activated as part of Franklin D. Roosevelt's New Deal program as a supply base for Civilian Conservation Corps camps across the United States. On 31 January 1968 the depot became home to the 561st Support Group. The depot previously operated as a United States Army Reserve facility. On November 19, 2013, the property was put up for auction by the General Services Administration.
