= Gold Coast Historic District (Omaha, Nebraska) =

Historic district in Nebraska, United States

Coordinates: 41°15′40″N 95°58′08″W

- U.S. National Register of Historic Places
- U.S. Historic district
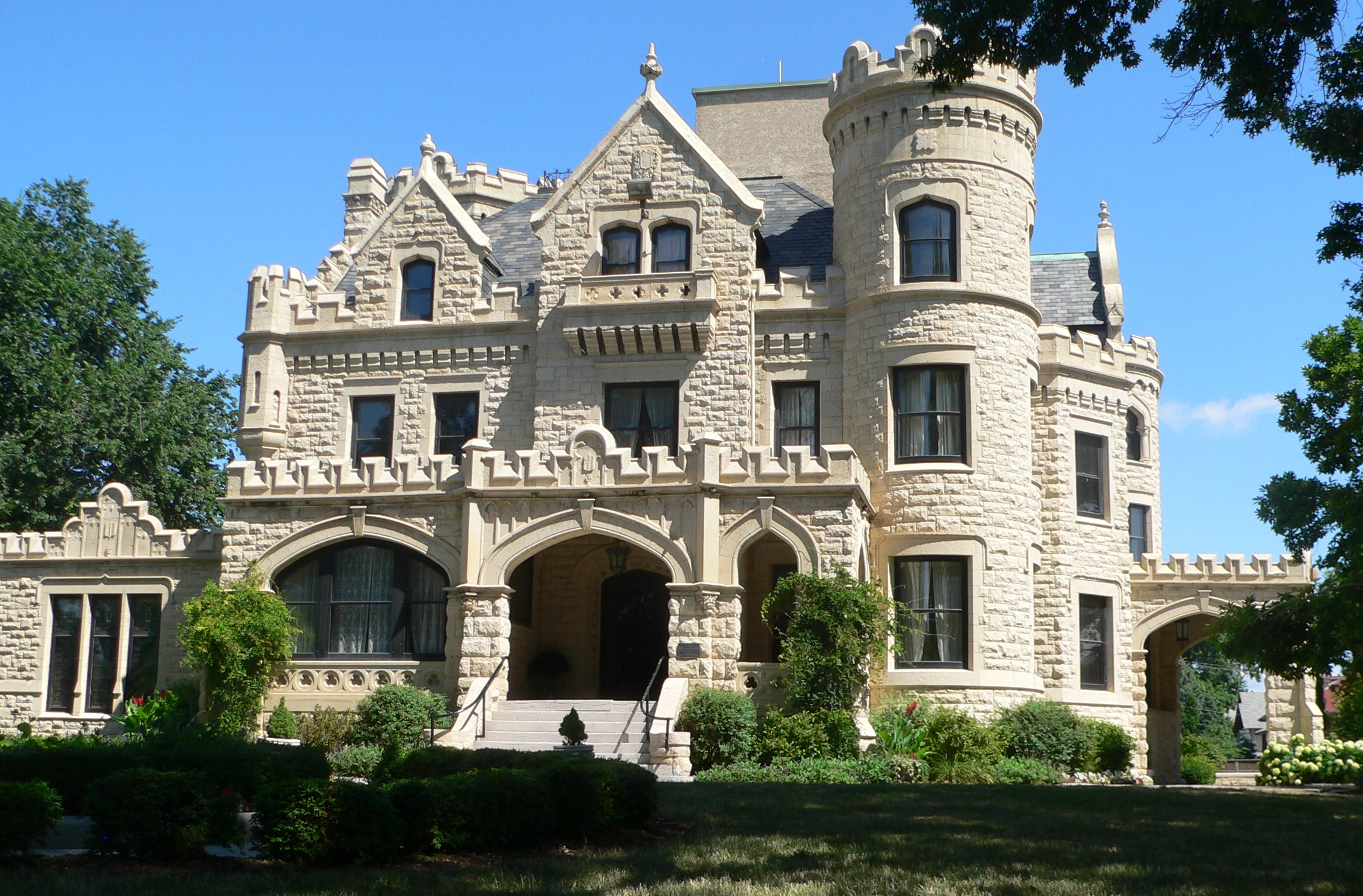
- Joslyn Castle, a landmark in Omaha's Gold Coast.

- Location within Nebraska Location within the United States
- Location: Omaha, Nebraska
- Area: 138 acres (56 ha)
- Built: 1889
- Architect: multiple
- Architectural style: Colonial Revival, Tudor Revival, Queen Anne
- NRHP reference No.: 97000237
- Added to NRHP: March 14, 1997

The Gold Coast Historic District is located in Midtown Omaha, Nebraska. Listed on the National Register of Historic Places in 1997, this historic district covers approximately a 30 block area roughly bounded by 36th, 40th, Jones, and Cuming Streets. The neighborhood housed many of Omaha's cultural and financial leaders between 1900 and 1920, taking over from Omaha's original Gold Coast in prominence.

After the area was developed in the late 1800s and early 1900s the area had mostly middle- and upper-class residents, and it included mansions and single family homes, and also some apartment buildings and duplexes. The West Farnam neighborhood, later called the Blackstone, was distinct from the Cathedral neighborhood at the time; both are included in the larger Gold Coast.

== About ==
This historic district was a trendy social hotspot in the 1920s, and was called the "Gold Coast" for its concentration of high-value homes. From 1880 through the 1940s, several large mansions were built for upper middle and upper class commuters. During this time Omaha's downtown was a long trolley-ride away, and the community was in the country. Two neighborhoods within the district (the Blackstone and Cathedral neighborhoods) reflect the housing styles of the times. The Joslyn Castle neighborhood is also within the area.

The area is home to several locally and nationally historically significant landmarks, including Joslyn Castle, Saunders School and St. Cecilia Cathedral, as well as several homes which are individually listed on the National Register of Historic Places.

== Modern developments ==
The Omaha Women's Club moved into the Henninger House at 518 South 38th Street in the Gold Coast area in 1963. The Upstream Brewing Company named a blonde ale after the neighborhood in the early 2000s.

== See also ==
- Old Gold Coast - The original Gold Coast neighborhood in Omaha
- Neighborhoods of Omaha, Nebraska
- Interactive map of Omaha historic districts
