= Midtown Omaha =

Municipal area

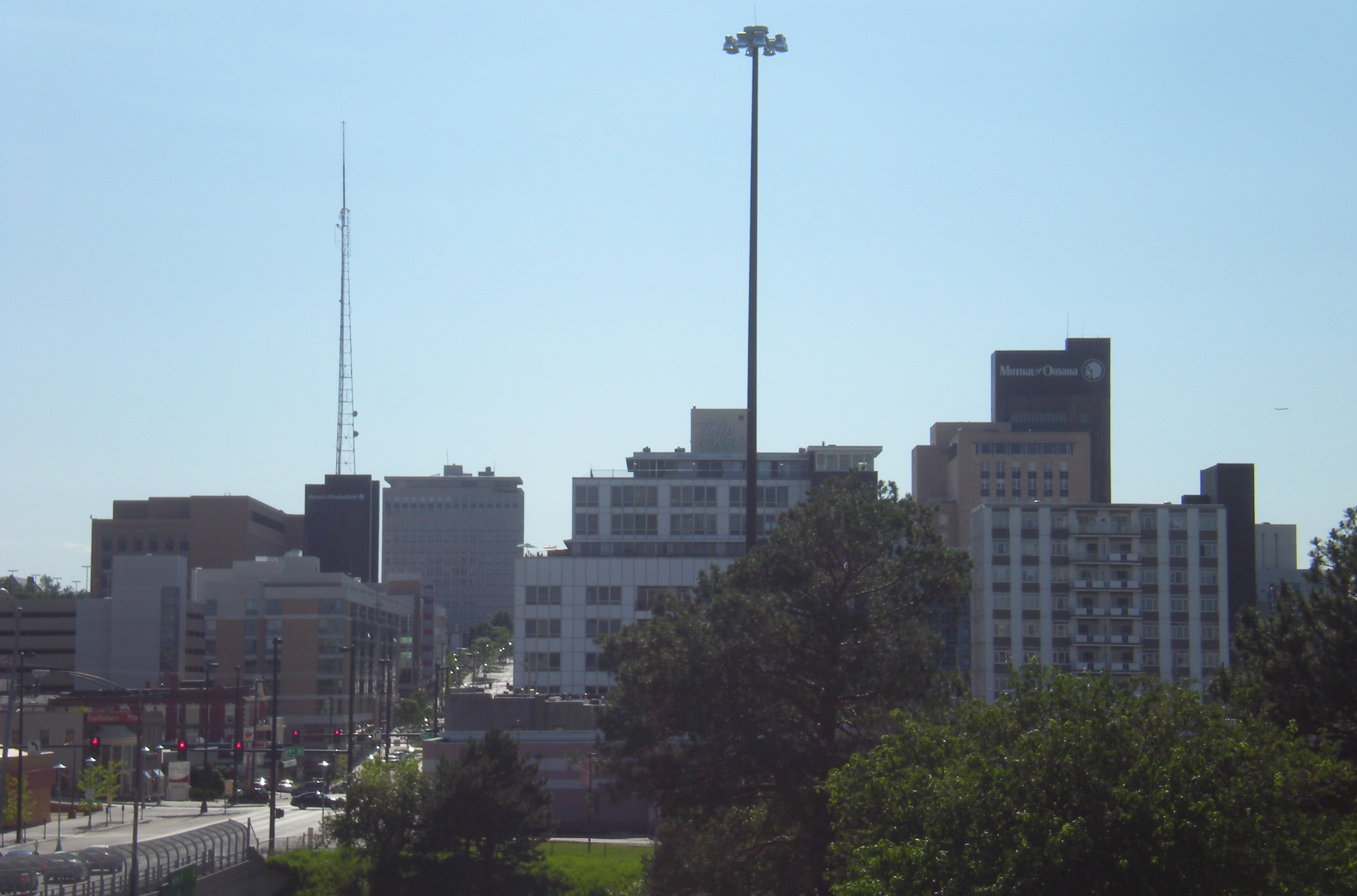
Midtown Omaha looking west from the Park East neighborhood of Downtown Omaha.

Midtown is a geographic area of Omaha, Nebraska that is a culturally, socially and economically important area of the city. It is home to major research centers, national corporations, several historic districts, and a number of historic residences.

== About ==
Midtown comprises 1.36 square miles (3.5 km^{2}) and is bordered on the north by Davenport Street, the south by Pacific Street, the east by I-480, and west by 48th street. The area is home to approximately 15,000 residents and 30,000 employees. It is densely populated with 11,000 residents per square mile, and is known for its tree-lined streets, historic architecture and economic and racial diversity.

=== Significant places ===
Many buildings in Midtown Omaha are listed on the National Register of Historic Places. Midtown has several places of local, regional and national importance, including the University of Nebraska Medical Center. The Walnut Hill Reservoir is a 125-year-old water supply source for the city. Nearby are several historic places of worship, including St. Cecilia Cathedral at 701 North 40th Street, the ninth largest cathedral in the United States. First Unitarian Church of Omaha was built in 1917 and is located at 3114 Harney Street. The Blackstone Hotel built in 1916 is located at 302 South 36th Street.

Other buildings around the area include the Mutual of Omaha headquarters and the Danish Brotherhood in America Headquarters. Berkshire Hathaway and Kiewit Corporation also have their corporate headquarters in Midtown.

=== Neighborhoods ===
Midtown is home to several historic neighborhoods, as well as modern developments after which Midtown is named.

A new neighborhood development in the area is called "Midtown Crossing at Turner Park." Being developed by Mutual of Omaha, this new community will include condominiums, apartments, hotel, movie theater, grocery store, restaurants and a health club. It will also renovate and expand Turner Park, one of Midtown's public parks.

The Morton Meadows Neighborhood is located in between Saddle Creek Road to the west, South 42nd Street to the east, Leavenworth Street to the north and Center Street to the south. With approximately 500 single family homes in the neighborhood, Morton Meadows is best known for its charming older houses built mostly in the early 1900s and the large tree lined boulevard running through the center of the neighborhood. The Morton Meadows Neighborhood Association officers include Michael Terry as president and Kathy Callahan as secretary.

Midtown Omaha property values have on a whole consistently improved over the past four years. The City of Omaha's efforts at revitalization through economic development, rising gas prices and Midtown Omaha's close proximity to large employers have all played an important role in the Midtown Omaha's appreciating home values.

=== Historical significance ===
The area is nearby to the home of several historic districts and other places that are listed on the National Register of Historic Places. They include the Drake Court Apartments and the Dartmore Apartments Historic District, the Gold Coast Historic District, the Field Club Historic District and the Bemis Park Historic District. The Omaha Quartermaster Depot Historic District is just outside the formal Midtown boundaries.

== See also ==
- History of Omaha, Nebraska
- Neighborhoods of Omaha, Nebraska
