= Railroads in Omaha =

History of rail transportation in Omaha, Nebraska

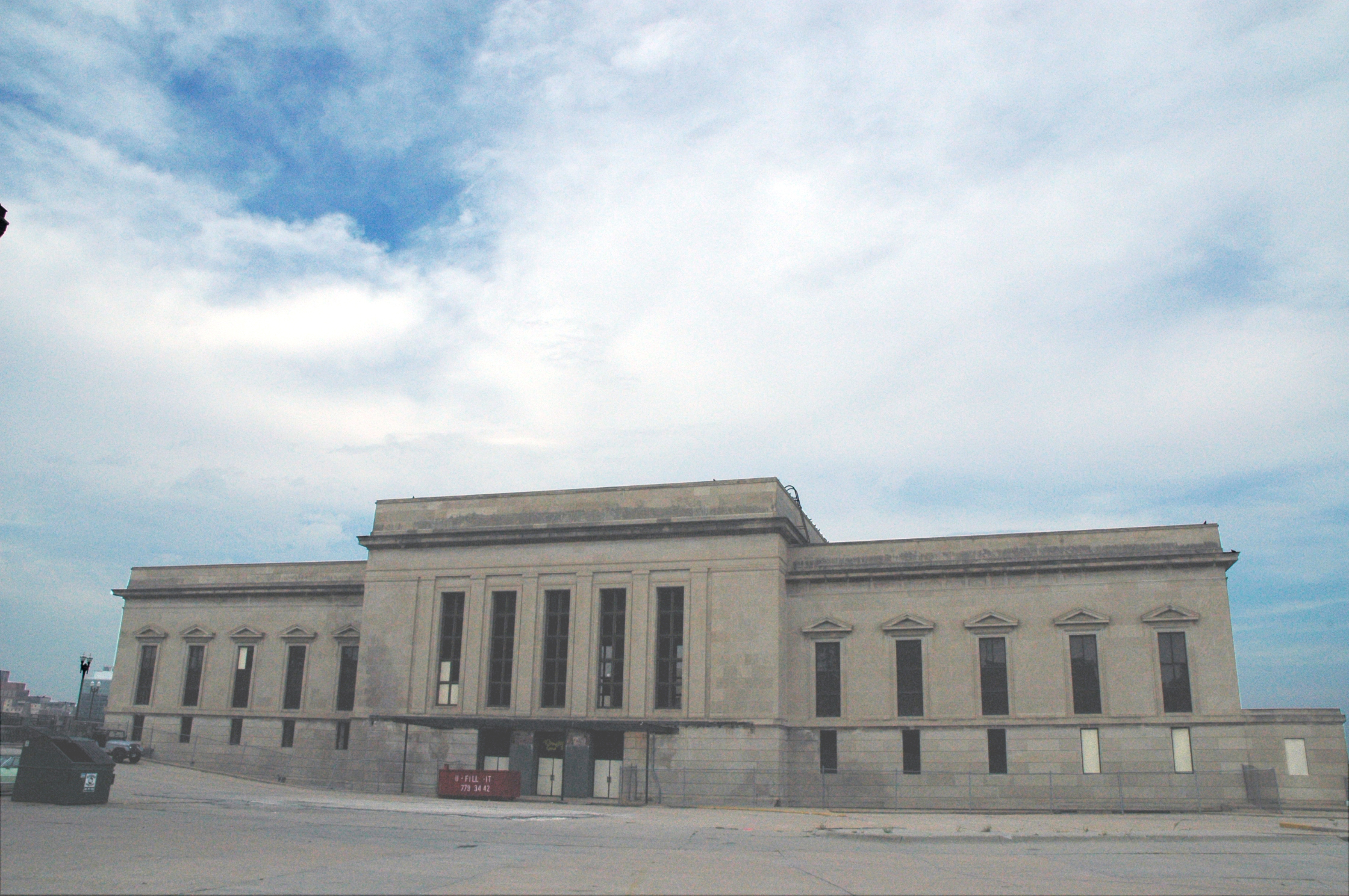
The Burlington Station in the Omaha Rail and Commerce Historic District near the Old Market

Railroads in Omaha, Nebraska, have been integral to the growth and development of the city, the state of Nebraska, the Western United States and the entire United States. The convergence of many railroad forces upon the city was by happenstance and synergy, as none of the Omaha leaders had a comprehensive strategy for bringing railroads to the city.

== History ==
Omaha was not supposed to be the center of the First transcontinental railroad; its neighbor across the Missouri River, Council Bluffs, Iowa was. In July 1862 President Abraham Lincoln signed the Pacific Railroad Act into law, which chartered a new organization called the Union Pacific Railroad. It was authorized to build a single line west from an "initial point" at the 100-degree meridian (near present-day Lexington, Nebraska). While the legislation seemed to favor Omaha, in 1863 Lincoln issued an executive order designating the terminal at Council Bluffs. Thomas C. Durant, the first head of the Union Pacific, arbitrarily decided the railroad should start at Omaha.

=== First Transcontinental Railroad ===
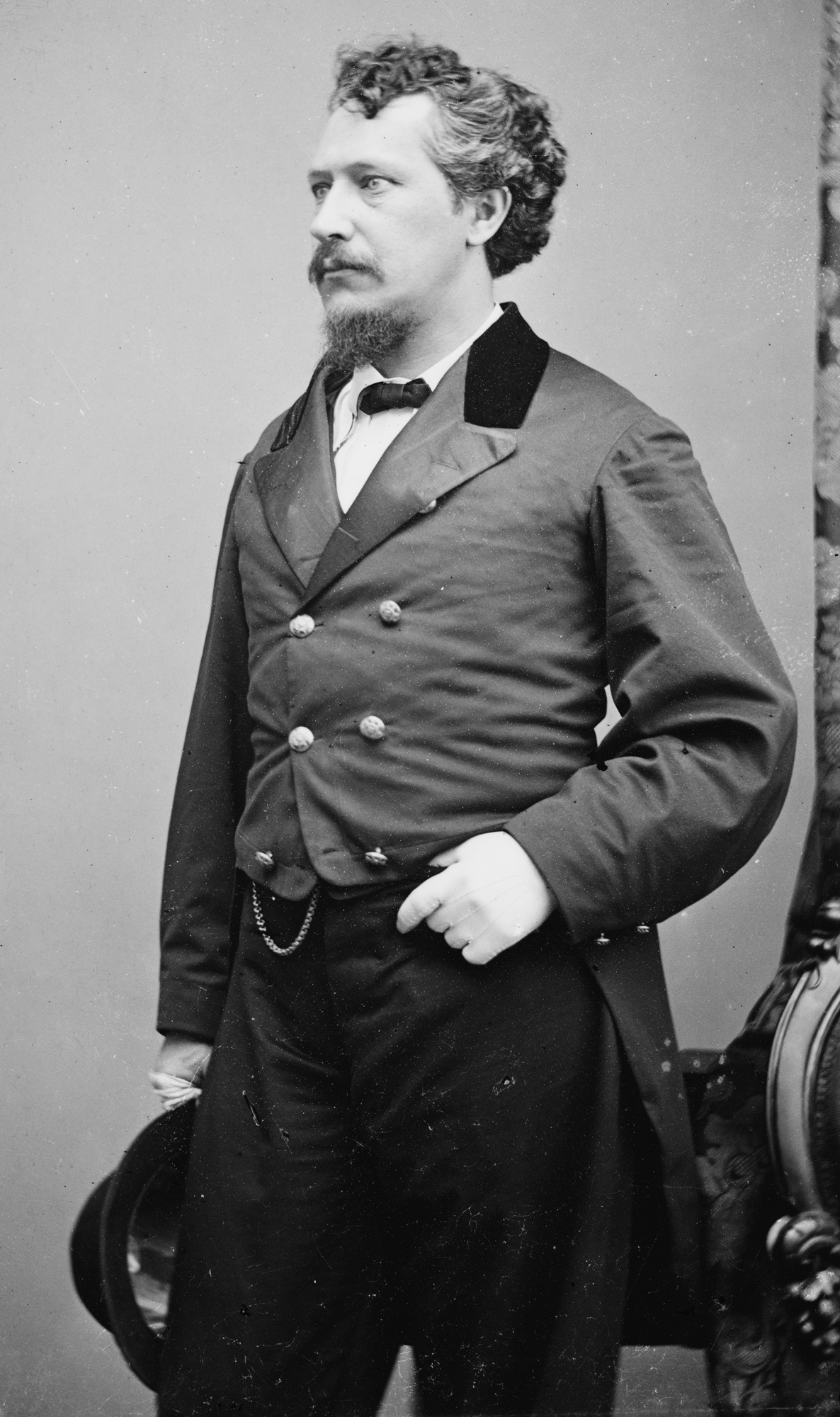
George Francis Train, Omaha promoter and land owner

In 1863 ground was broken near Miller's Landing on the Missouri River for the First Transcontinental Railroad. Along with local financier Edward Creighton, George Francis Train was the promoter who was chiefly responsible for the city's landing the railroad. He was made rich by its location convenient to the land which he owned near Deer Park. Landing the railroad made the value of his property for development skyrocket. The Union Pacific Railroad has been headquartered in Omaha since its inception in 1867, starting with its fifty-year occupancy of the Herndon House in downtown. In 1872 Union Pacific opened the first bridge across the Missouri to Omaha. The historic Overland Route continues to run through the city.

=== Omaha Stockyards ===
The South Omaha Terminal Railway, a subsidiary of the Union Stock Yards Company of Omaha, was a spur line established to serve the Omaha Stockyards, which opened in the 1880s. It was transformed into the South Omaha Terminal Railway in the 1920s. Because of the Stockyards, by the 1880s Omaha was served by every major railroad in the country. Other railroads in the city included the Omaha Road, Omaha, Lincoln and Beatrice Railway, Omaha Southern Railroad, Kansas, Nebraska and Omaha Railway, Omaha and Republican Valley Railway, Omaha and South Western Railroad and Omaha, Abilene and Wichita Railway.

Making use of the constellation of railroads, the US Army built the Omaha Quartermaster Depot in Omaha in 1881. It supplied many military institutions in Nebraska and throughout the Western United States.

By 1955, Omaha had surpassed Chicago as the largest stockyards and packing center in the world. It processed thousands of animals per week. The packing plants received animals from 22 states, with most of the stock transported by railroad.

=== Omaha Belt Line ===
The Omaha Belt Line was a 15-mile (24 km) long railroad that circumnavigated the city starting in 1885. Carrying passengers and cargo, the rail was operated by the Missouri Pacific Railroad. The railroad also had branches into Lincoln, Wahoo and Nebraska City. The line was discontinued in the early 1960s.

=== Defunct railroads from Omaha ===
There were several railroads that went from Omaha throughout the state of Nebraska and beyond. The Kansas, Nebraska and Omaha Railway ran from Omaha to southwestern Kansas, specifically to provide access from the cattle regions of present-day Oklahoma and Texas.

=== General service ===
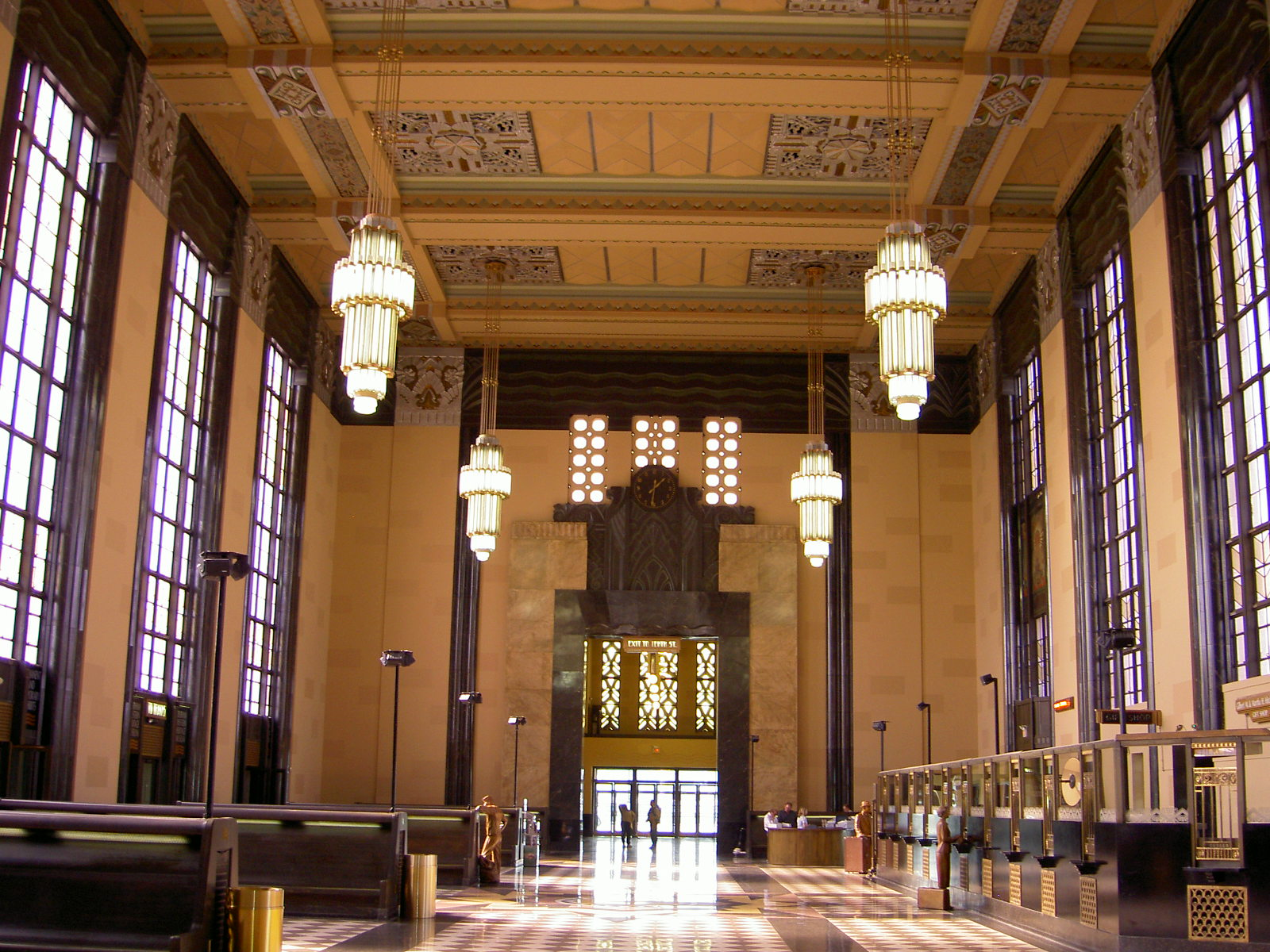
Inside the Union Station, the current home of the Union Pacific Railroad archives

In 1867 Ezra Millard, Andrew J. Hanscom, and Augustus Kountze formed the Omaha Horse Railway, the first horsecar in the city. The Omaha Cable Tramway Company was the city's only cable car. It started in 1884 and ended in 1895 after consolidating with the Horse Railway as the Omaha Street Railway Company. In 1896 the new company disbanded as competitors moved in. An electric car was built between Omaha and Benson specifically to promote that suburb's development during these years.

By 1901 Gurdon Wattles consolidated several of the older companies to organize the Omaha and Council Bluffs Streetcar Company. After receiving a 30-year franchise from the City of Omaha, the company established a mass transit system that covered the entire city, including commuter trains and interurbans. Streetcar lines operated in Omaha until 1955.

== Train stations ==
By the opening of the Trans-Mississippi Exposition in 1898 the city boasted two important train stations. The Union Station was served by the Chicago and North Western Railroad, Wabash Railroad, Missouri Pacific Railroad, Chicago Great Western Railway, Rock Island Railroad, Milwaukee Road and the Union Pacific Railroad.

It also served as the Union Pacific headquarters, which needed to expand in the 20th century. Architect Gilbert Stanley Underwood remarked on his 1931 design of Union Station, "We have tried to express the distinctive character of the railroad: strength, power, masculinity." Union Station was the first Art Deco station in the country.

The Burlington Station was served by the Chicago, Burlington and Quincy Railroad, and later the Amtrak. Other stations in the city included the Webster Street Station, Gibson Station, Ralston Station, Florence Depot and the North 34 Street Station.

=== Defunct stations ===
There have been many railroad stations downtown and smaller depots throughout Omaha since the inception of the Union Pacific in the city.

Name	Location	Opened	Closed	Notes
Burlington Station	925 South 10th Street	1898	1974	2015 home of KETV 7
Briggs Station	5300 Sargent St (demolished)			
DeBolt Station	7000 North 60th Street			
Druid Hill Depot	North 32nd and John Creighton Boulevard	1888	Unknown	Former station on the Omaha Belt Line.
Florence Depot	9000 North 30th Street	1887	1966	Open and operated as a historical museum.
Gibson Station				
Lake Street Station	North 40th and Lake Streets	1887	Still standing	
Missouri Pacific Freight Depot	North 14th and Webster Street			
Nicholas Street Depot	North 43rd and Nicholas Street	1887		
Nicholas Street Freight Depot	North 15th and Nicholas Street	1887		
Oak Chatham Depot	4351 North 22nd Street	1887		
Ralston Station				
Union Station	801 South 10th Street	1938	1971	Current home of the Durham Western Heritage Museum.
Union Stockyards Depot	South 28th and L Streets			The station for the South Omaha Terminal Railway.
Walnut Hill Depot	Military Avenue and Hamilton Street	1887		
Webster Street Station	Webster and Saddle Creek Road	1887		
West Lawn Station	Aksarben Drive and Mercy Road			Former station on Chicago and North Western Railroad.
Walnut Hill Station				34th and Nicholas Street.
	South 28th and B Streets			

== Bridges ==
=== Railroad bridges ===
There have been many railroad bridges, trestles and other structures to carry railroads over structures in Omaha.

Name	Location	Opened	Closed	Notes
Union Pacific Missouri River Bridge	Across the Missouri River			
East Omaha Bridge	Across the Missouri River	1893 / 1903	1980	Built by the Illinois Central Railroad.
O Street Viaduct	O Street	1885 / 2001		
Cuming Street Trestle	4448 Cuming St	1887		Built for the Belt Line Railway, owned by the Missouri Pacific, demolished.
North 30th Street Trestle	4900 N. 30th			Owned by the Chicago and Northwestern Railroad, demolished.
OPPD Trestle	41°19’39.1″N 95°56’25.6″W			Built to serve the Omaha Public Power District Coal Plant on J.J. Pershing Drive, demolished.
Omaha Road Trestle	41°19’37.2″N 95°56’58.4″W			Built by the Omaha Road to straddle Sharon Drive.
North 16th Street Trestle	4140 N. 16th Street	1887		Built for the Belt Line Railway, owned by the Missouri Pacific, demolished.
Union Pacific Carter Lake Bridge	4405 Carter Lake Shore Dr. West			Demolished.
Missouri Pacific Carter Lake Bridge	35 Carter Lake Shore Drive			Demolished.
Union Pacific Missouri River Bridge	Across the Missouri River	1893 / 1903		
Union Pacific Missouri River Bridge	Across the Missouri River	1893 / 1903		

Because of agreements and lawsuits between the City of Omaha and railroad companies with trackage in Omaha, the companies were responsible for building and maintaining several overpasses for wagons, cars, pedestrians, and streetcars to travel over tracks. These included the Locust Street viaduct and the Nicholas Street viaduct.

== 20th century ==
In 1939 Union Pacific, a major Hollywood film, was premiered in Omaha to celebrate the city's railroad heritage. The McKeen railroad motor car was a specialized self-propelled passenger car manufactured in Omaha.

The railroads continued to be important to freight, business and passenger travel into the 20th century. In 1947 the city's two stations had 114 passenger trains per day that connected all across the West and Midwest.

Railroads carried many of the tens of thousands of animals for processing at the packing plants, located near the stockyards and railroads. The city's stockyards and packing industry were the largest in the world by the mid-1950s, surpassing Chicago.

== Railroads in the 21st century ==
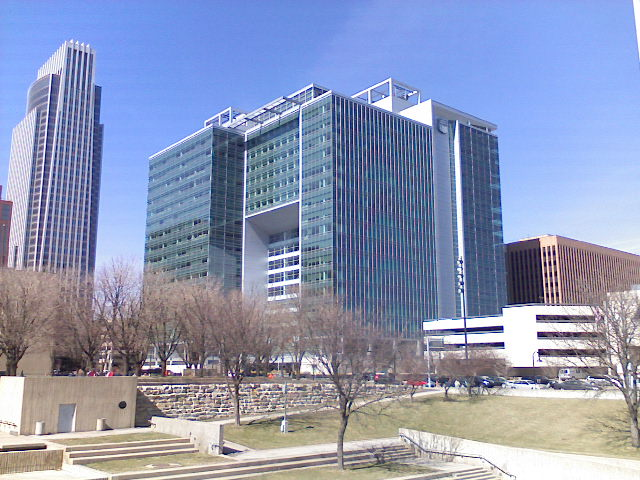
The Union Pacific Center in Downtown Omaha

Today, the Omaha Rail and Commerce Historic District celebrates this connection, as do the listing of the Burlington Train Station and the Union Station on the National Register of Historic Places. Two large train engines have been placed as monuments and industrial art in Kenefick Park in South Omaha. They face Interstate 80, one of the successor transportation modes.

Several major railroads formerly served Omaha, including Chicago, Rock Island and Pacific (CRIP), Chicago, Burlington & Quincy (CBQ); Chicago Great Western (CGW); Illinois Central (IC); Chicago & Northwestern (CNW); Wabash (WAB); Chicago, Milwaukee, St Paul & Pacific (The Milwaukee Road) (CMStP&P); Chicago, St. Paul, Minneapolis and Omaha; Missouri Pacific (MP); and the Union Pacific.

Omaha was not spared from the steep decline in passenger service in the second half of the 20th century. Amtrak took over most passenger service in 1971. By the 1980s, it had cut back service to just three trains, all running out of Chicago–the California Zephyrto Emeryville, California, near San Francisco; the Desert Wind to Los Angeles via Salt Lake City and Las Vegas; and the Pioneer to Seattle. The Desert Wind and Pioneer were eliminated in 1997, leaving Omaha served by only the California Zephyr. Reflecting the decline in passenger service, Amtrak abandoned the old Burlington station in 1974, and operated from a nearby "Amshack" before moving to a smaller station just 220 feet from the old Burlington station.

Omaha is the location of Union Pacific Railroad's corporate headquarters. Located downtown, Union Pacific Center is the largest building by square feet in the state of Nebraska, and the 4th tallest in Omaha.

== See also ==
- Transportation in Omaha
