= Transportation in Omaha =

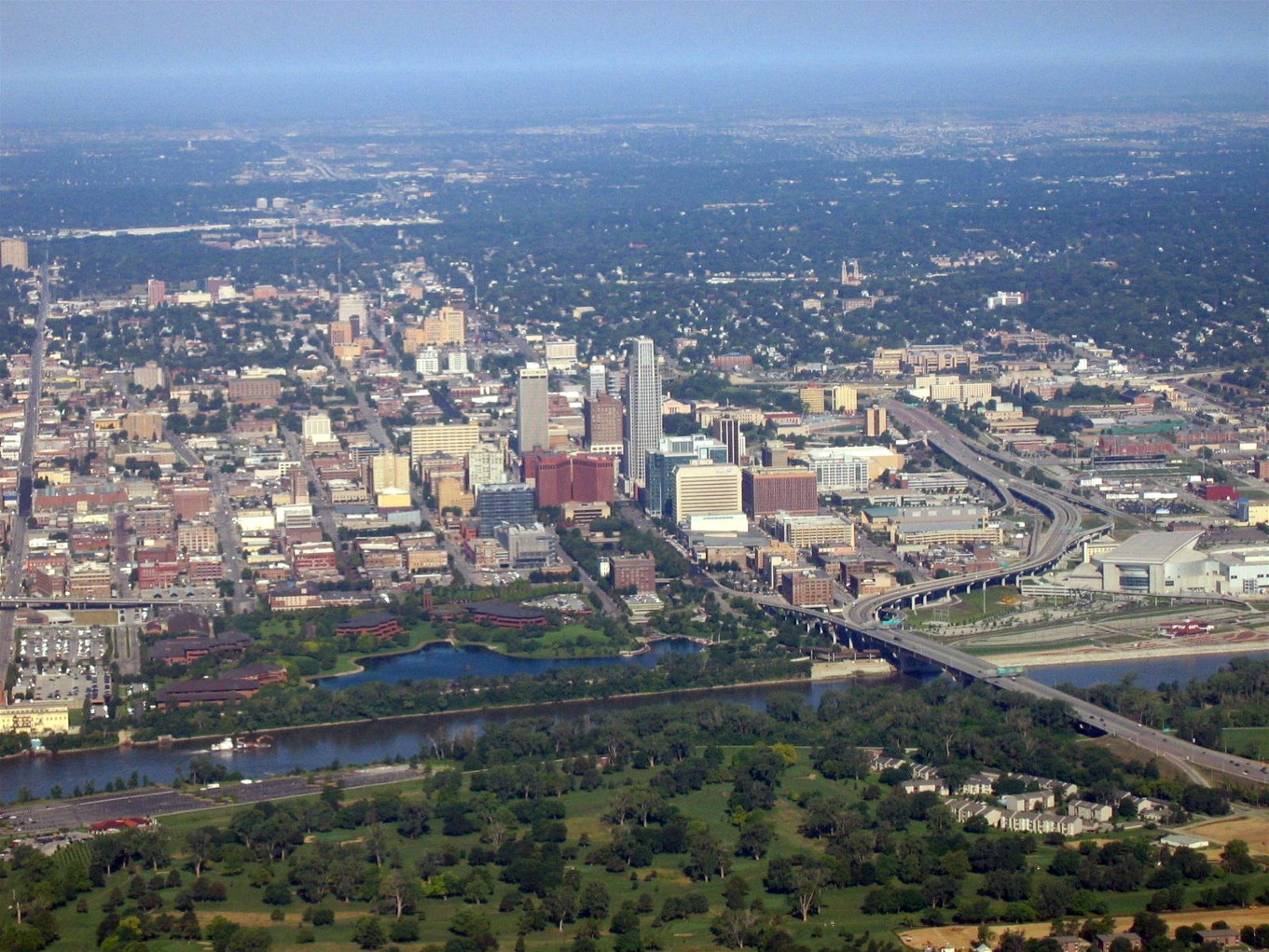
The Missouri River and the Interstate Highway System have both been important to transportation in Omaha.

Transportation in Omaha, Nebraska, includes most major modes, such as pedestrian, bicycle, automobile, bus, train and airplane. While early transportation consisted of ferries, stagecoaches, steamboats, street railroads, and railroads, the city's transportation systems have evolved to include the Interstate Highway System, parklike boulevards and a variety of bicycle and pedestrian trails. The historic head of several important emigrant trails and the First transcontinental railroad, its center as a national transportation hub earned Omaha the nickname "Gate City of the West" as early as the 1860s.

During a tumultuous pioneer period characterized by its centrality in proximity to the Western United States, transportation in Omaha demanded the construction of massive warehouses where frontier settlers could stock up and communities west of Omaha got food and supplies to build themselves with. Riverboats and stagecoaches jammed the riverside city with a variety of newcomers, prospectors and shady characters. Early Omaha also landed the Union Pacific Railroad headquarters, leading to its important place in national railroad lore.

After quickly growing into a city, Omaha failed to pave its streets accordingly. A chaotic transportation system was highlighted by several miles of successful horsecar tracks; however, the city only ever had four miles (6 km) of cable car service. Several early suburbs were built on reliance of service from these lines, including Dundee, Benson and Kountze Place. In the early 1880s an extensive boulevard system was built to create a park-like atmosphere for drivers throughout the city. The Trans-Mississippi Exposition in 1889 led to the construction of many new transportation features, particularly the magnificent Burlington Station.

In the 1930s the city's transportation system was marred by violent protests. Transit workers wanted to unionize, and with the main company's management against any effort to change Omaha's reputation as a non-unionized city. After the introduction of buses in the early 1950s, streetcars were closed down, and in the last years of the decade the city began construction on its components in the Interstate Highway System.

Today Omaha's transportation system is growing with the city, and trails for bicycles and pedestrians, as well as public transport, highways and parkways, and other innovations are being developed. The city has a section of the Lincoln Highway listed on the National Register of Historic Places, and there are more than 100 miles (160 km) of Interstate and freeway lanes, more than any other area in the state of Nebraska.

== Pioneer period ==
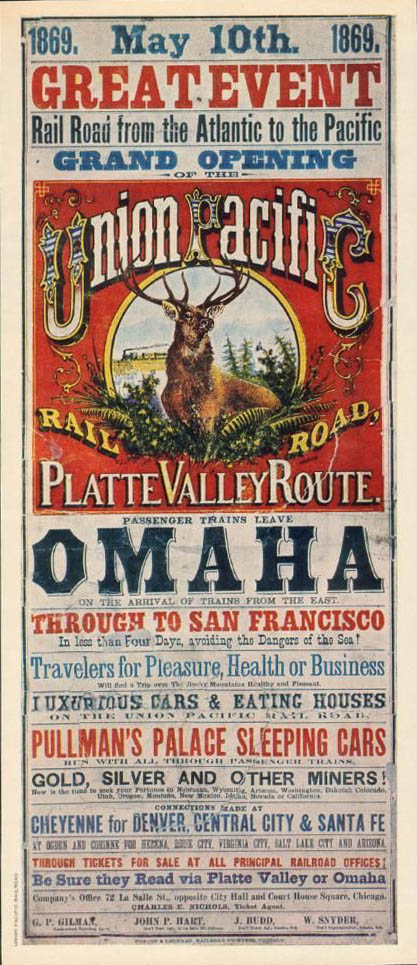
A period Union Pacific poster advertising their route from Omaha.

Omaha was not projected to become a great city or bigger than its neighbor across the Missouri River, Council Bluffs, Iowa. In 1856 a land speculator reported to his East Coast concerns that,

"C. Bluffs is steadily growing down towards the river and someday it will be one great city on both sides the river with Rail Road & foot & Carriage Bridges connecting the two – and this is now the hope and talk of the Bluffers." – J. Barker, 1856.

In August 1859 Abraham Lincoln visited land he had invested in Council Bluffs, and while there did not consider it worth the time to cross the river to the village of Omaha.

=== Water traffic ===
In 1804, fifty years before the city of Omaha was founded, the Lewis and Clark Expedition first arrived via the Missouri River. The 1806 Fort Lisa and 1820 Cabanne's Trading Post were important fur trading outposts located in proximity to the river, along with earlier Fontenelle's Post in Bellevue. The Engineer Cantonment was built by Captain Stephen Watts Kearny's Yellowstone Expedition in 1819. The Expedition's craft, the Western Engineer, was the first steamboat to successfully venture up the Missouri River to the Omaha-Council Bluffs area.

The Missouri was the reason Omaha was founded, and continued to be important to the city's growth for many years. In 1853 William D. Brown had the first vision for the city, leading him to found the Lone Tree Ferry crossing the Missouri River from Council Bluffs, Iowa. Later the Council Bluffs and Nebraska Ferry Company hired Alfred D. Jones to plat Omaha City, which was among the first settlements in the Nebraska Territory. Along with the Lone Tree Ferry Landing in Downtown Omaha, other ferries were established in the Omaha area at Florence, Saratoga and Bellevue. Large steamboats would carry provisions up the Missouri from St. Louis, stocking the warehouses in Jobbers Canyon and loading the trains of the Union Pacific and at the Omaha Quartermaster Depot, which in turn supplied the U.S. Army's Department of the Platte.

The Banner State was the first steamboat to land materials for building the city in early 1854, before the city was formally founded. Until 1879 Captain Joseph La Barge was the principal figure among the Missouri steamboat captains in the early years of the city. According to J. Sterling Morton, the golden era for steamboating on the Missouri was from 1855 to 1860, just before the advent of the railroads. In 1857, 174 steamboats carrying 13,000 tons of freight tied up at Omaha wharves. When Omaha became the outfitting center for Colorado gold seekers headed for Pikes Peak in 1859, 268 steamboats arrived at Omaha between March and November.

With railroads becoming the dominant form of long-range shipping and passenger travel in the early 1870s, riverboats like those in Omaha became obsolete. However, as late at 1949 the steamship Avalon was letting passengers in Omaha, before becoming one of the famous St. Louis steamboats in the 1960s.

=== Railroads ===
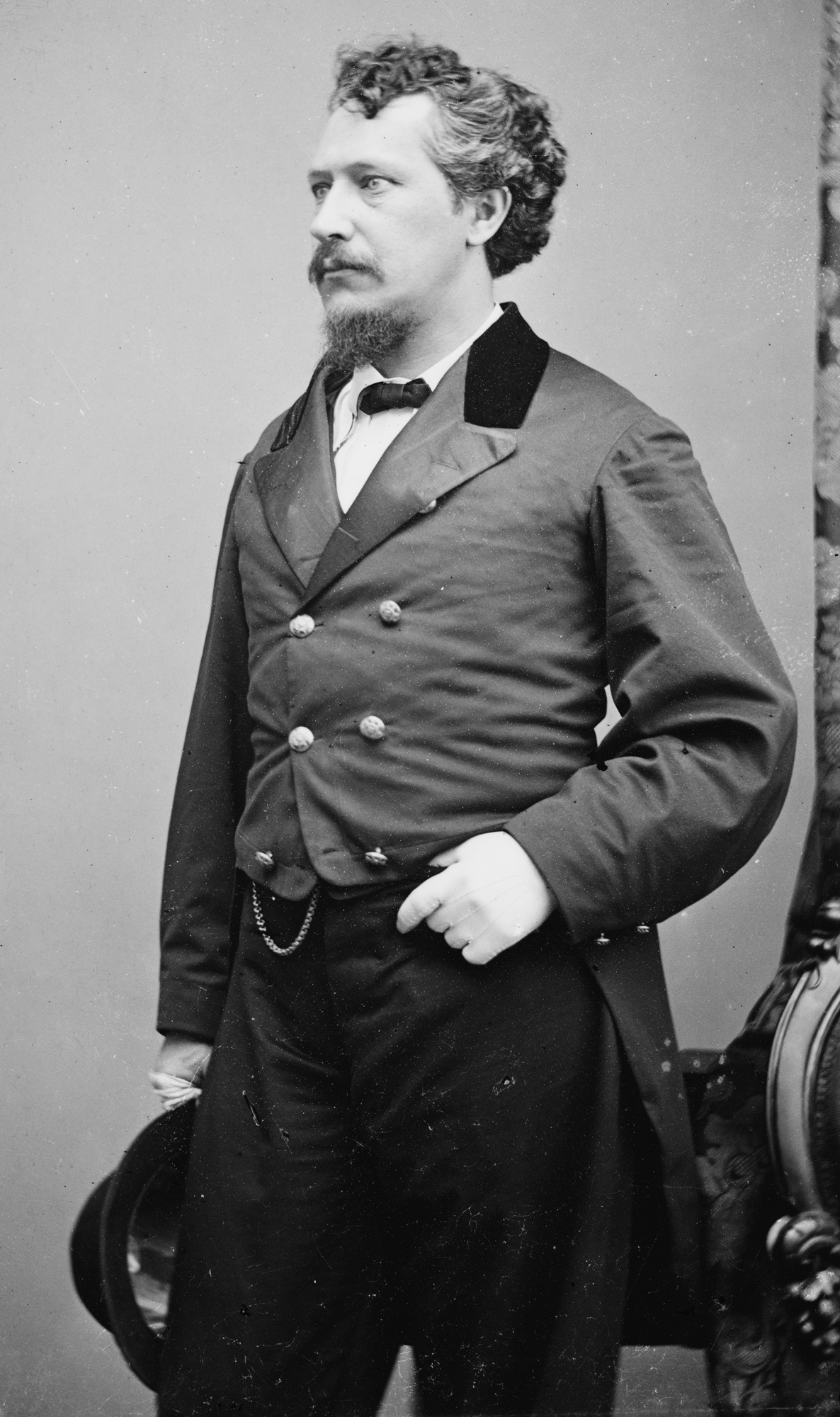
George Francis Train, Omaha promoter and land owner.

In 1863, ground was broken near Miller's Landing on the Missouri River for the First transcontinental railroad. Along with local financier Edward Creighton, George Francis Train was the promoter who was mostly responsible for the city landing the railroad. He was made rich from its convenient placement near land that he owned (near Deer Park. The Union Pacific Railroad has been headquartered in Omaha since its inception in 1867. In 1872, Union Pacific opened the first [railroad] bridge across the Missouri to Omaha.

=== Trails ===
In the 1860s and 1870s, the city became a major outfitting center for the major trails that went across Nebraska, including the Oregon, California and Mormon Trails. Jobbers Canyon was built in Downtown Omaha for the purpose of outfitting these migrants. Stagecoach lines had arrived by 1858, including the Local Stage Coach Company in 1857, and the Western Stage Company which began its easterly and westerly routes in Omaha. The Pony Express and Wells Fargo lines maintained offices in the city.

=== Streets ===
Omaha had terrible streets through the late 1880s, which caused many residents to believe the city was not progressing appropriately. This lack of responsiveness by the city government was caused by property owners throughout the city who did not want to pay for improvements. On rainy days stagecoaches would sink up to their hubcaps, and residents wore knee-high boots to wade through the mud, and at times rivers ran through the streets.

=== Public transportation ===
In 1867 Ezra Millard, Andrew J. Hanscom, and Augustus Kountze formed the Omaha Horse Railway Company to provide horsecar service in the city. By the late 1870s the line had five miles (8 km) of track, 10 cars, 70 horses, 20 employees and 495,000 passengers annually. The Omaha Cable Tramway Company was the city's only cable car, and started in 1884 and ended in 1895 after consolidating with the Horse Railway as the Omaha Street Railway Company. In 1896 the new company disbanded as competitors moved in. An electric car was built by Eurastus Benson between Omaha and Benson specifically to promote that suburbs development during this time.

== 1880s – 1950 ==
=== Streets ===
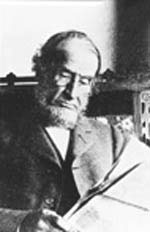
Horace William Shaler Cleveland, designer of Omaha's boulevard system.

In 1880 only a quarter-mile of Omaha's estimated 118 miles (190 km) of streets were paved. In 1883 Andrew Rosewater, brother of newspaper owner Edward Rosewater, became city engineer and began an ambitious project to modernize city streets. By 1886 the city had 44 miles (71 km) of paved streets, including asphaltum, Colorado sandstone, Sioux Falls granite and wooden blocks.

In 1889 Horace W.S. Cleveland proposed that the city of Omaha develop a series of "broad ornamental avenues, known as boulevards or parkways" designed "with a tasteful arrangement of trees and shrubbery at the sides and in the center", similar to the comprehensive plans of European cities in the mid-19th century. His plan was accepted by the city's Parks Commission, resulting in the construction of Omaha's Prettiest Mile Boulevard in 1892, and dozens of other boulevards in the through to the present. Today, Fontenelle and Lincoln boulevards are among the many remnants of the early plan; Sorenson Parkway is a modern version of the historical plan. Saddle Creek Boulevard, currently known as Saddle Creek Road, which was originally the westernmost boulevard in the system.

=== Bridges ===
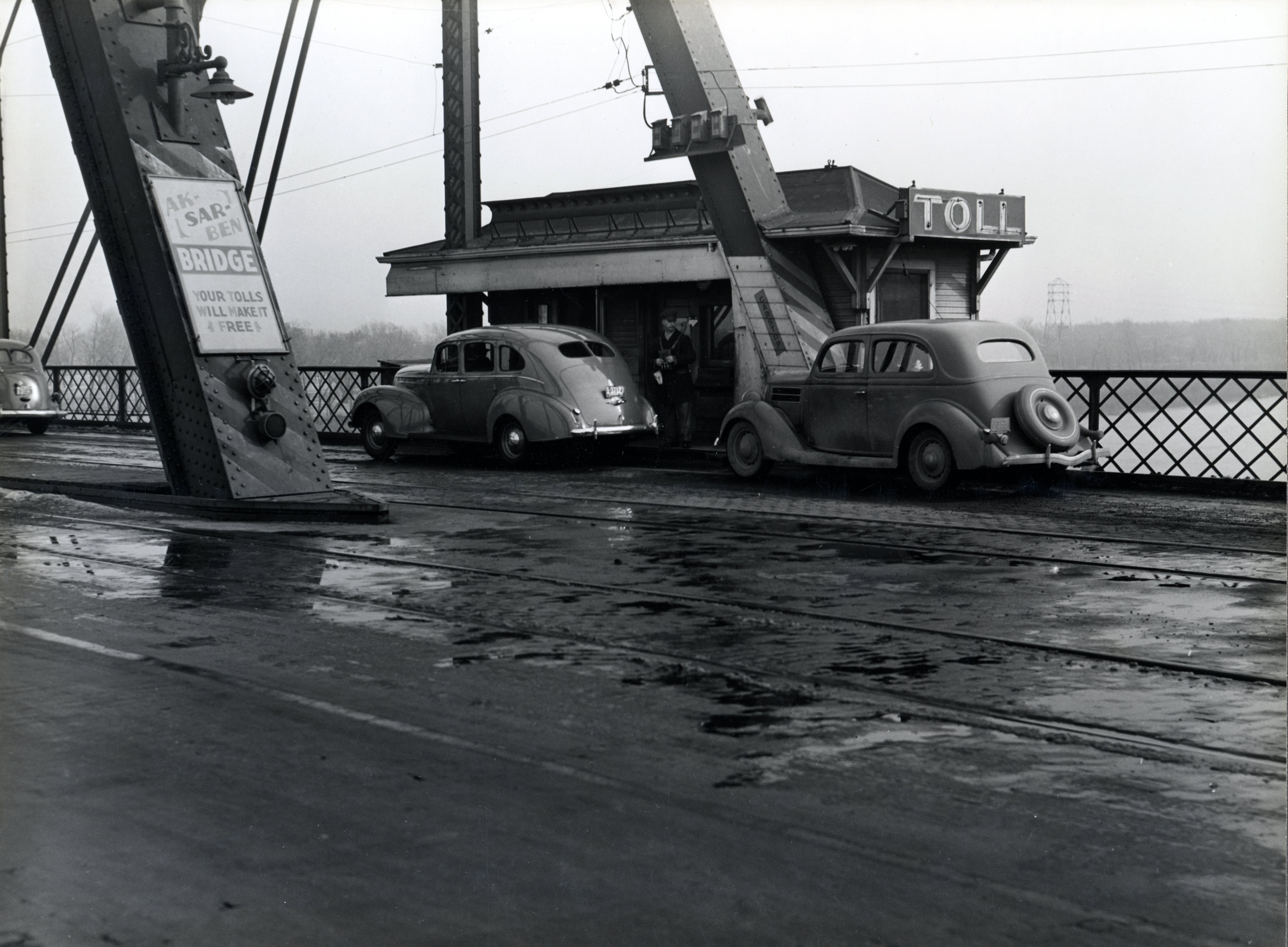
Ak-Sar-Ben Bridge toll booth in November 1938.

While the Union Pacific Missouri River Bridge was the first railroad bridge across the river, the 1,400-foot (430 m) Douglas Street Bridge opened in 1888 as the first road bridge. The East Omaha Bridge was originally opened in 1893, and rebuilt a decade later in 1903. The Mormon Bridge was first attempted to be built across the river in 1932, and failed; it was finally successfully constructed in 1952. The South Omaha Bridge opened in 1936. The Knights of Ak-Sar-Ben operated the Douglas Street Bridge as a toll bridge from 1938 to 1947. The bridge was removed in 1968. Traffic was carried by a new girder bridge built in 1966 for I-480. The Saddle Creek Underpass, over which is the Dodge Street Overpass, was completed in 1934 by the Works Progress Administration. Over 1,175 cubic yards (898 m^{3}) of dirt were excavated to lower Saddle Creek Road sufficiently to pass under the overpass, which is still in use today. Listed on the National Register of Historic Places in 1992, it is part of the Bridges in Nebraska Multiple Property Submission as well.

=== Highways ===
Official Lincoln Highway marker.

In 1889 Otto Baysdorfer built Omaha's first auto, an electric car. The "Ottomobile" was the first of nearly a dozen car manufacturers eventually started in Omaha. The Ottomobile weighed 265 pounds, had two cylinders, and could achieve a speed of 15 miles per hour. An "Auto Row" developed along Farnam Street and featured dealers, garages, and parts stores.

The original Lincoln Highway in Omaha was designated through Omaha in 1913. Crossing the Missouri River into Omaha on the old Douglas Street Bridge, it traveled west on Dodge Street, then meandered across the state following section lines. Some of these sections were built exclusively to accommodate the highway. Important buildings on the Lincoln Highway in Omaha included the Hupmobile Building, the Nash Building at 902–912 Farnam and 901–911 Douglas streets, and the Blackstone Hotel at Farnum Street and 36th Street. Additionally, the Rose Blumkin Performance Arts Center at 20th and Farnum Street and the Farnum Street Automobile Row, from 30th to 40th Streets were both important landmarks.

In 1930 49,128 autos were registered in Omaha; ten years later 65,489 were registered to drive on local streets.

After trucks became popular in the 1910s, the Omaha Stockyards grew exponentially. Cattle, hogs and sheep were shipped cheaper by truck than by trains. In 1919 27% of livestock at the Stockyards was shipped by truck; by 1940's it rose to over 75%. In 1955 the Stockyards became the biggest livestock distribution center in the United States, and almost all of the cattle was shipped by truck.

=== Airport ===
The aforementioned Baysdorfer provided Omaha with another invention by successfully flying an airship in the city in 1889. In 1929 a bond was passed that would construct the Omaha Municipal Airport in East Omaha. This was thought to embody the city's hope for the future; however, air travel did not become popular in Omaha until the 1960s. The land was swampy and had to be filled in with silt taken from the bottom of Carter Lake. Northwest Airlines started service between Minneapolis and Omaha in 1930.

In the late 1940s Eppley Airfield was completed. In 1959 the airport was named for Eugene C. Eppley, the Omaha Eppley Hotel magnate. Eppley's estate donated $1 million to be used to convert the Omaha Municipal Airport into a jet port.

=== Public transportation ===
The Omaha and Council Bluffs Railway and Bridge Company was founded in 1886 to span the Missouri River. In the late 1880s the city had five franchise companies providing transit services within city limits. They included the Omaha and Southwestern Street Railway Company, which provided services to Kountze Place, Dundee, Bemis Park and the Gold Coast neighborhoods. Short lines ran with limited purposes: one went only to a baseball field at the end of its line, while another ran to and from a park.

By 1901 local businessman Gurdon W. Wattles consolidated several of the older horsecar and cable car companies to create the Omaha and Council Bluffs Streetcar Company, which later became the Omaha Traction Company. After receiving a 30-year franchise from the city of Omaha, the company established a mass transit system that covered the entire city, including commuter trains and interurbans.

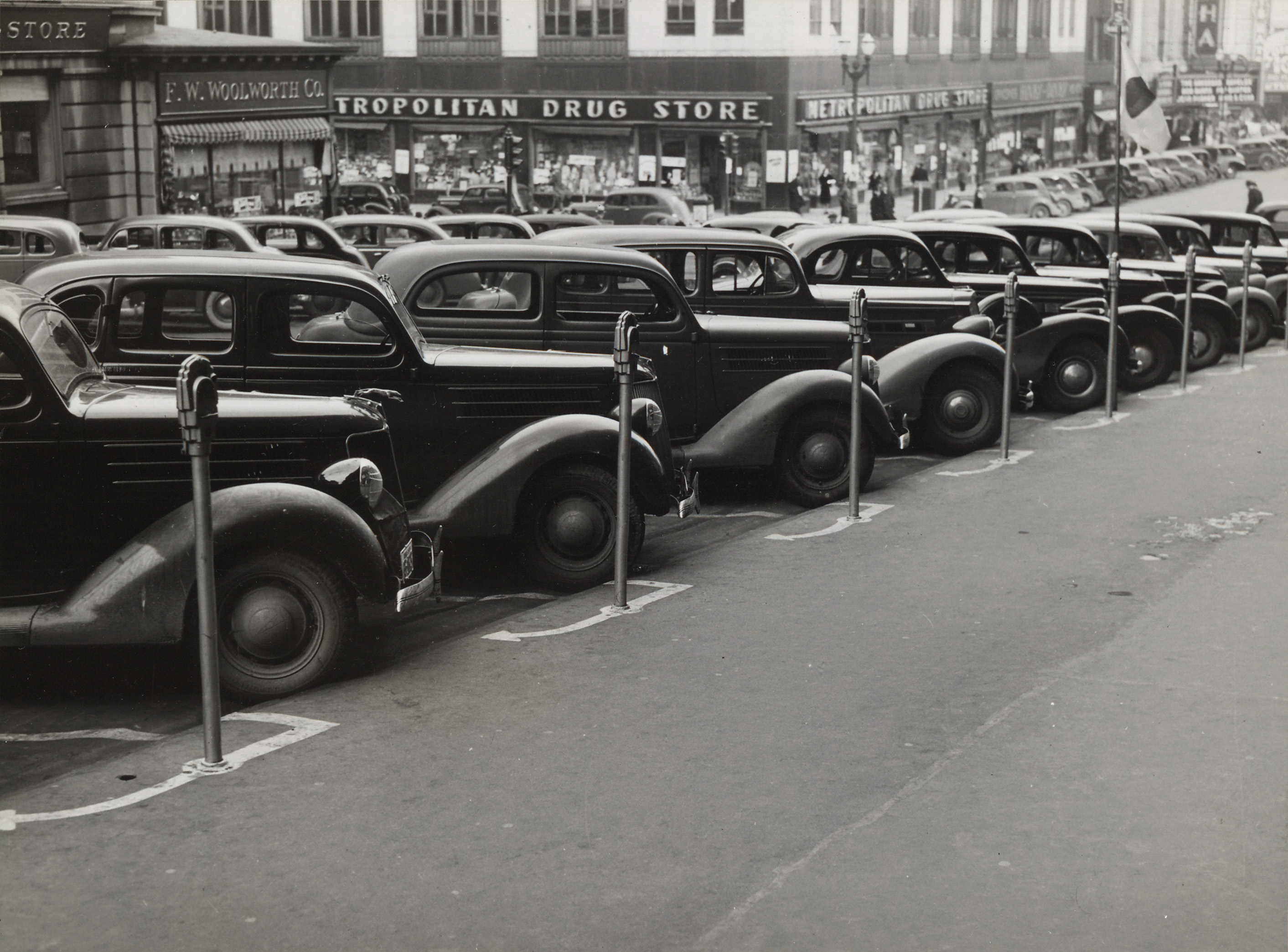
The Woolworth's Store in Downtown Omaha in 1938.

==== Traction Company strike ====
Wattles was vehemently opposed to unionization, and in 1909 fought strikes in favor of unionization with hired policemen and rampant violence. By 1934 the Amalgamated Association of Street and Electric Railway Employees was organized in Omaha.

However, by April 1935 the fragile truce between pro-open shop management and pro-union forces broke. A long, violent strike ensued. Strikebreakers were hired, and within four days the company rolled out heavily fortified streetcars, complete with windows covered by heavy wire and armed guards on board. While few cars attracted passengers, the cars encountered little resistance. The company resisted calls for arbitration from the Omaha City Council, and continued employing strikebreakers. In early May violence broke out, with rifle attacks, violent beatings and bombings across the city. In June riots broke out throughout the city with mobs burning streetcars, looting and two deaths. The city government lost control of the violence and called in the National Guard, which sent 1,800 troops while Governor Robert Cochran declared martial law and ordered the streetcars to stop running. After the governor intervened and Wattles allowed arbitration, a number of agreements were made. However, no changes occurred, and strikebreakers stayed on the job. The violence ended, court cases ensued, and the situation slowly faded away. The Omaha Traction Company never unionized.

=== Omaha Belt Line ===
The Omaha Belt Line was formed in 1883 by the Union Pacific; some shady dealings by Jay Gould brought the Belt Line into the control of the Missouri Pacific Railroad by 1885, when it was constructed with Union Pacific materials under the control of the MoPac. Stations along with Line included the Florence Depot, Webster Street Station and the Ralston Station. Operated by that company until the early 1960s, today the Line is largely abandoned, with a section redeveloped into the recreational MoPac Trail.

== 1950–present ==
=== Streets ===
Starting in 1950 the city has continuously developed and redeveloped its major streets, particularly relying on them for east-west traffic. Major east-west thoroughfares in Omaha include Fort, Ames, Maple, Blondo, Dodge, Pacific, Center, L, Q and Harrison streets. Major north-south thoroughfares in Omaha include North and South 24th streets, 30th street, Saddle Creek Road, and 72nd, 84th, 90th, and 120th streets. South 10th Street is important in South Omaha.

=== Highways ===
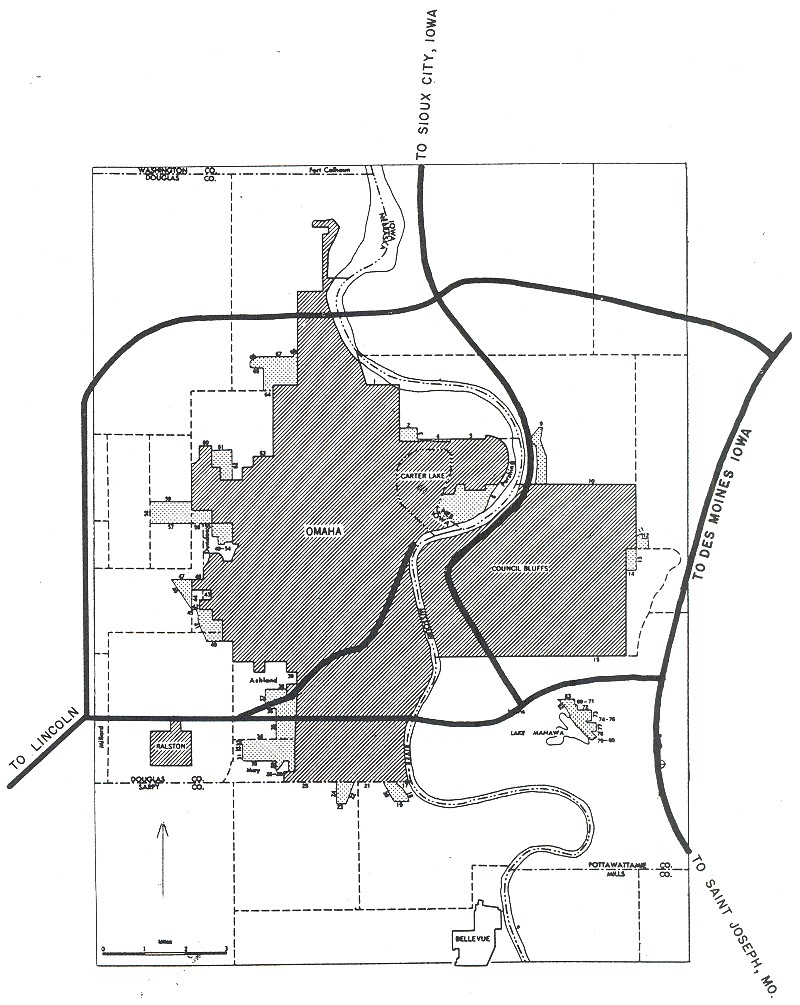
Early planned routes for Omaha's Interstate highways.

The first long segment of Interstate 80 in Nebraska to be opened was a fifty-mile section between Dodge Street in Omaha and the West Lincoln interchange in 1961.

Construction of the freeway in North Omaha in the 1970s faced many hurdles. Built immediately after the construction of I-480, this 4-mile (6.4 km) section was originally supposed to be designated as Interstate 580. However, the city refused to invest the additional money the federal government required to gain the designation. Coupled with social unrest in the 1970s, the highway is blamed for causing a 30 percent housing loss and major increase in crime. The freeway became the route of U.S. Highway 75 and is known locally as the North Freeway.

Today, Omaha is well connected to the Interstate Highway System. The city has eleven highway exits along Interstate 80. From that Interstate drivers can connect to Nebraska Highway 50, US 275/NE 92, I-680 and I-480/US 75. Continuing north, I-680 connects with I-29 near Crescent, Iowa and, prior to October 2019, reconnected with I-80 near Neola, Iowa (that segment from I-29 near Crescent to I-80 near Neola is now signed as I-880); I-480 cuts through Downtown Omaha to connect with I-29 in Council Bluffs, Iowa. The North Freeway also veers from I-480, and in 2005, the Nebraska Department of Roads began a project to bring the I-480/US 75 interchange up to Interstate standards. Construction is expected to be complete in 2009, and it is unknown if the North Freeway will receive an Interstate designation upon completion of the project.

There are a number of important arterial roads throughout Omaha. U.S. Route 75 comes south through Omaha from Fort Calhoun along North 30 Street, North Freeway, I-480 and Kennedy Freeway, exiting through Bellevue. U.S. Route 6 crosses into the city from Council Bluffs on I-480, also called the Gerald R. Ford Freeway in honor of the Omaha native son. It then follows Dodge Street, until it intersects South 204th Street, when it runs south towards Gretna. Nebraska Highway 64 assumes the route of the former Military Road northwest out of Omaha, following Maple Road and West Maple Road to converge with US 275 at Waterloo. US 275 becomes Nebraska Highway 92 after crossing the South Omaha Veterans Memorial Bridge, following Missouri Avenue, which then becomes "L" Street. At South 132nd Street, at which point it veers northeast to follow the old Mormon Trail along Industrial Road when it joins West Center Road, crossing the Platte River and continuing westward.

In 2005 a portion of the Lincoln Highway in Omaha was listed on the National Register of Historic Places.

==== Traffic monitoring ====
Beginning in fall 2007 there will be more than 30 traffic cameras operating on Omaha area freeways, including one at I-80 near Gretna and another on West Dodge near 120th Street. Operated by the Nebraska Department of Roads, the sensors and cameras are not used to catch speeders or for other traffic enforcement. The state also operates an extensive traffic operations center that uses the cameras to monitor Omaha traffic patterns. Similar to traffic monitoring centers in Lincoln and North Platte, the one in Omaha is the biggest and has the greatest capability to provide traffic information.

=== Public transportation ===
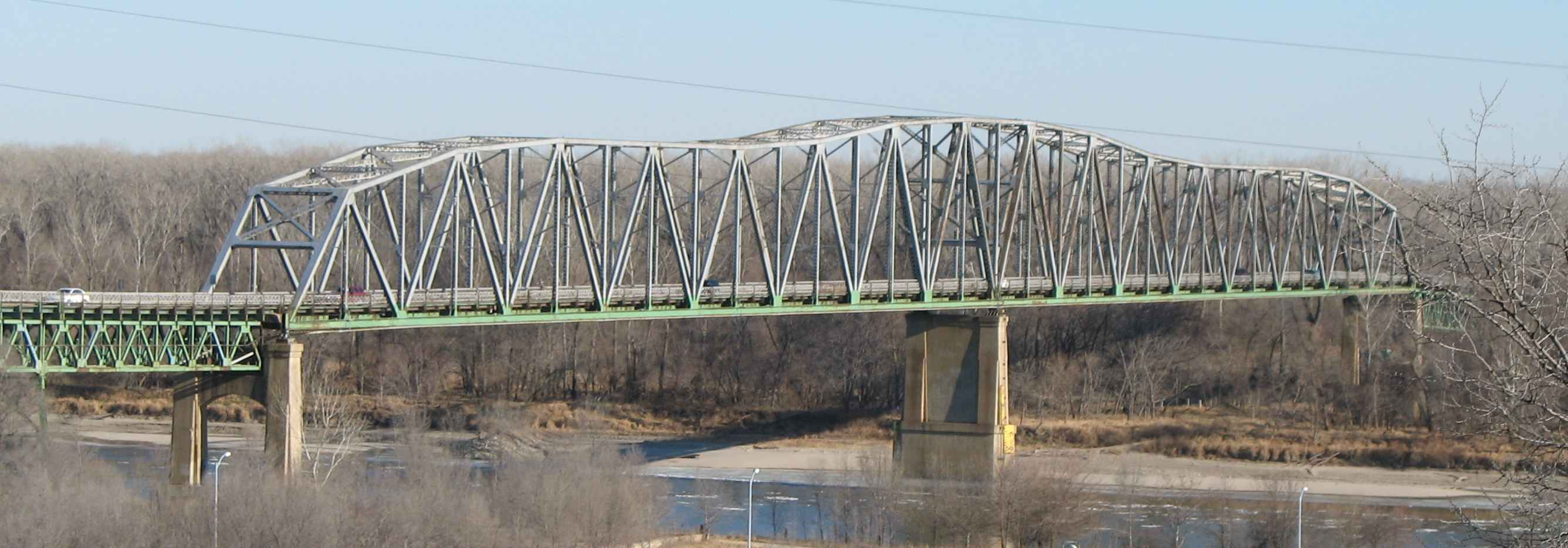
The South Omaha Veterans Memorial Bridge from the Nebraska side.

The Omaha Traction Company, which operated as the Street Railway Company, changed its name to the Omaha Transit Company when streetcar service ended in the city in 1952. After World War II Omahans preferred their automobiles and new highways. When the Urban Mass Transit Act of 1964 was passed, Omaha's private transit companies were not able to apply for federal subsidies available to public transit operators. The Omaha Transit Company ceased operations on June 30, 1972, when the City of Omaha assumed authority for public transportation in the city. City Transit Lines, another private company in Omaha, went out of business on that day as well. The Metro Area Transit Authority was created by the Nebraska Legislature, consisting of a five-member board appointed by the mayor and confirmed by Omaha's City Council and the Douglas County Commissioners. It acquired the assets of the Omaha Transit Company and selected assets of the City Transit Lines of Council Bluffs, along with more than $3,000,000 in federal funding. The Authority operates today as Metro Transit.

Today the Authority supervises the level of service, miles and hours of operation within Omaha, and maintains individual service contracts with local authorities outside Omaha. Currently, Metro has three contracts, including the cities of Council Bluffs, Bellevue and the Tri-Communities of Ralston, LaVista and Papillion.

Metro recently completed three new transit centers, which function much like airport hubs. Located at Benson Park, Westroads Mall, and Metro Community College in South Omaha, they are designed to bolster the city's public busing needs. These join existing centers in Midtown and North Omaha.

Construction on ORBT, a bus rapid transit system began in fall of 2018 and concluded in fall of 2020. The city has also proposed the Omaha Streetcar, with an initial opening date of 2026. However, the streetcar's rail began being put in place starting in early 2026, with it now being planned to open to public use in 2028. The streetcar is expected to be free to ride.

In addition to local public transportation, Omaha is served by several carriers for intercity public transportation. The Omaha station provides Amtrak passenger rail service to residents with one daily train between Chicago and Emeryville, California on the California Zephyr. Intercity bus service is provided by Burlington Trailways, Express Arrow, and Jefferson Lines.

=== Air ===
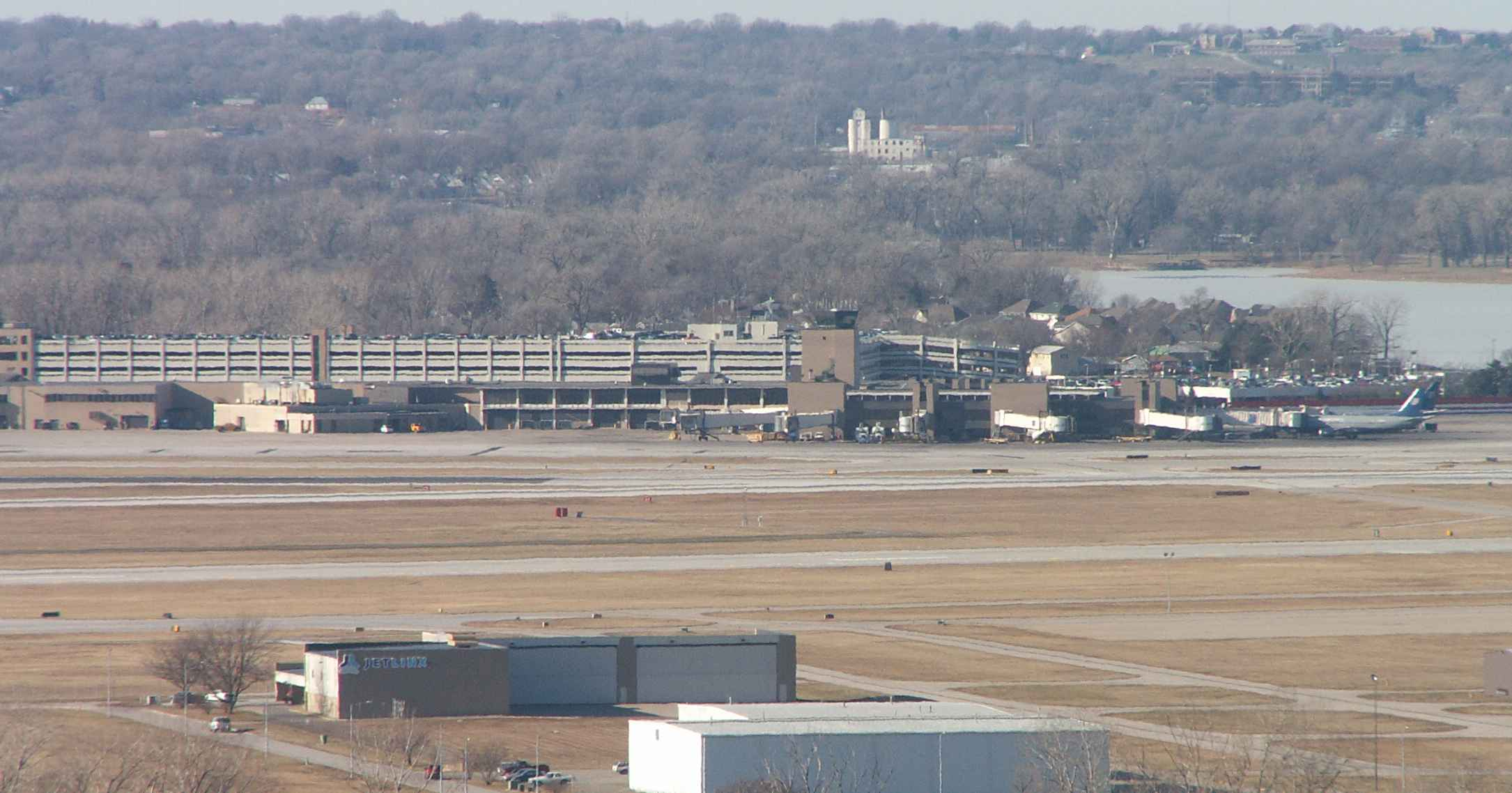
Eppley Airfield terminal in Omaha.

Today Eppley Airfield sits on 2,650 acres (10.7 km^{2}) and handles approximately 400 flights a week. There are two concourses that hold 20 gates. The airport handled more than 4.4 million passengers in 2007, and as of September 2008, Southwest Airlines is the largest carrier handling approximately 24 percent of passengers. United is the second-largest carrier, handling approximately 19 percent of passengers. Currently, all regularly scheduled flights from Eppley Airfield terminate within the United States.

Airlines serving Omaha include Alaska, Allegiant Air, American, Delta, Frontier, Southwest, and United.

=== Trails ===
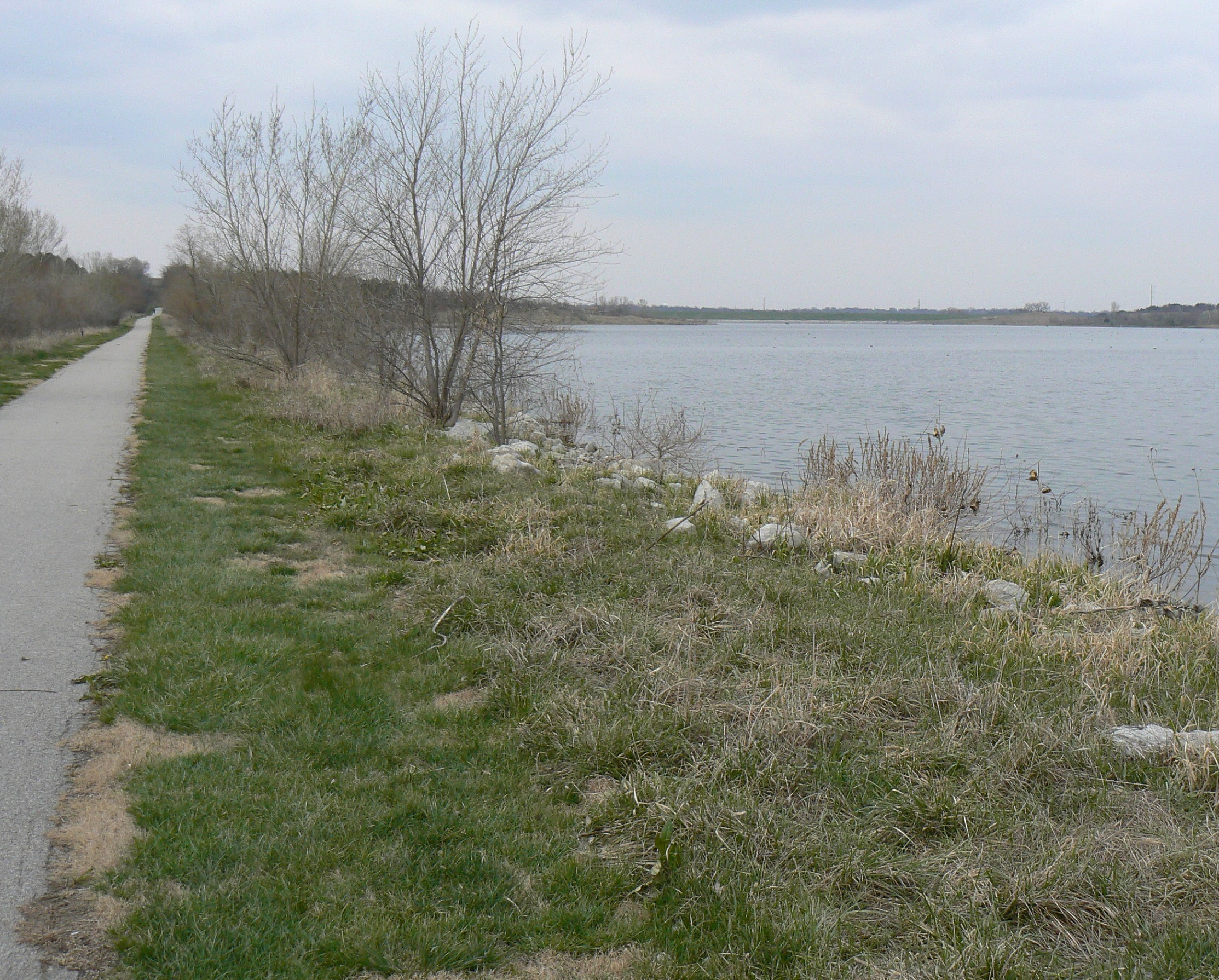
One of the Trails in Omaha, located at the Chalco Hills Recreation Area.

Omaha was completely devoid of trails leading up to early 1989. That year the city began developing trails, and since then the city of Omaha has developed approximately 67 miles (108 km) of paved recreational trails, and another 35 miles (56 km) of trails are scheduled for completion within the next eight years.

Paved and unpaved trails and paths are used for recreational and commuter purposes throughout the city. Popular among bicyclists, runners, hikers and recreational walkers, these trails are included in comprehensive plans for the city of Omaha, the Omaha metro area, Douglas County, and long-distance coordinated plans between the municipalities of southeast Nebraska.

The Missouri River Pedestrian Bridge will connect Miller's Landing to Council Bluffs in 2009. A riverfront trail will run the length of the river from the South Omaha Bridge to N.P. Dodge Park.

=== Water traffic ===
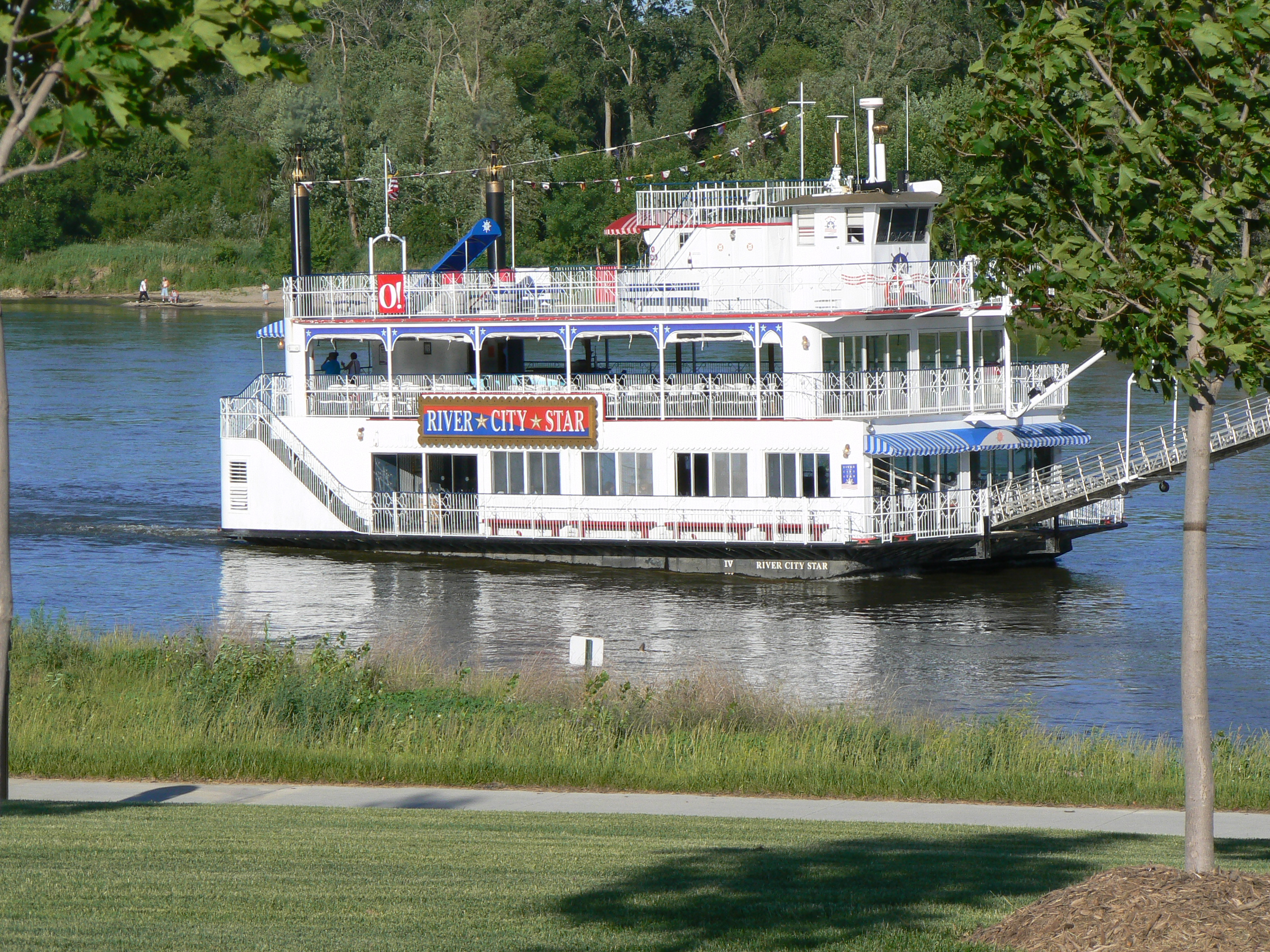
The River City Star.

An anomaly in the city's transportation is the River City Star, a passenger excursion paddleboat that sails between Omaha and Council Bluffs. The boat is docked at Miller's Landing near the CHI Health Center, near mile marker 617 on the Missouri River.

Marinas for public usage are operated by the Omaha Parks and Recreation Department. Dodge Park, located in North Omaha, has 326 slips, while the new Riverfront Marina in Downtown Omaha has 31. Levi Carter Park, which has a long history as a water haven, offers non-restricted boating for jet skis, recreational boating and water skiing. No wake boating allowed available at Lake Cunningham, Standing Bear Lake or Zorinsky Lake; however, these lakes offer opportunities for sailing, fishing and pleasure boating. Cunningham Lake offers a small marina where rental boats are available.

The Port of Omaha was located downtown where Miller's Landing is now. In addition to handling outbound barge shipments of grain, it also handled inbound shipments of steel and asphalt.

The Omaha District of the U.S. Army Corps of Engineers operates from the city.

== See also ==
- Interstate 80 in Nebraska
- Omaha Streetcar
- Plug-in electric vehicles in Nebraska § Omaha

== Image gallery ==
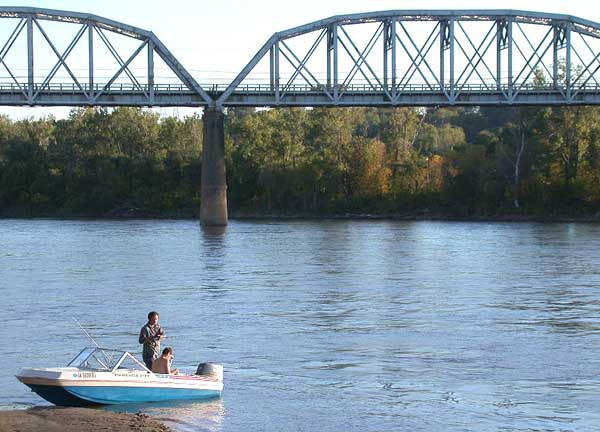
Fishermen on the Missouri River facing the Union Pacific Bridge.

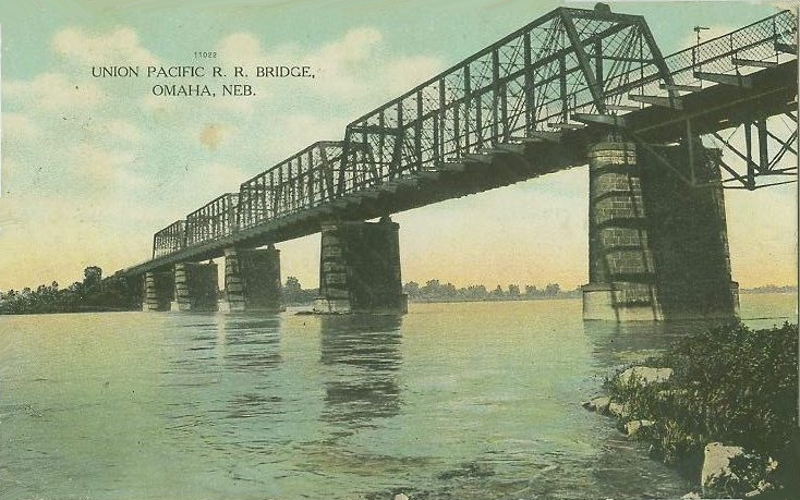
Union Pacific Bridge about 1909.

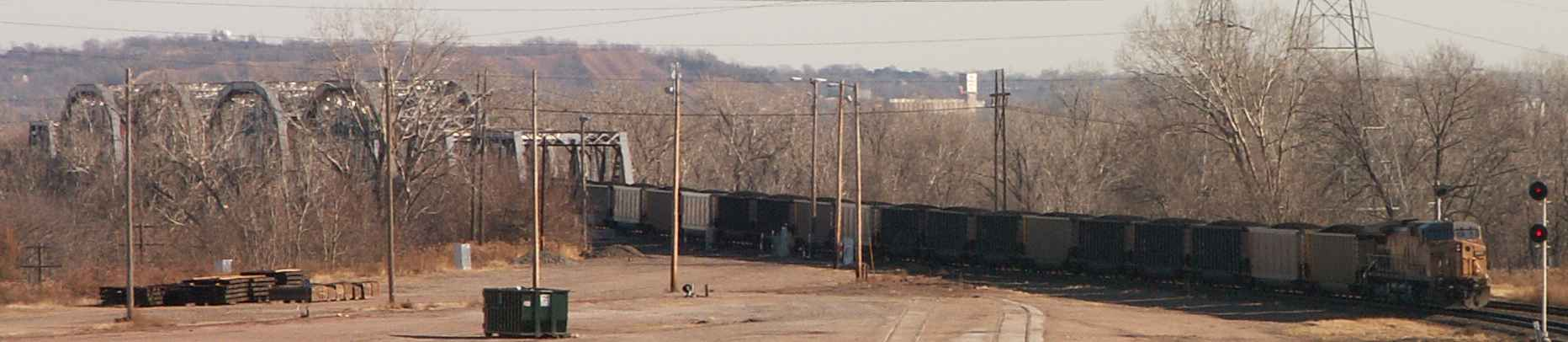
Coal train crossing the Union Pacific Bridge with the Loess Hills in background.

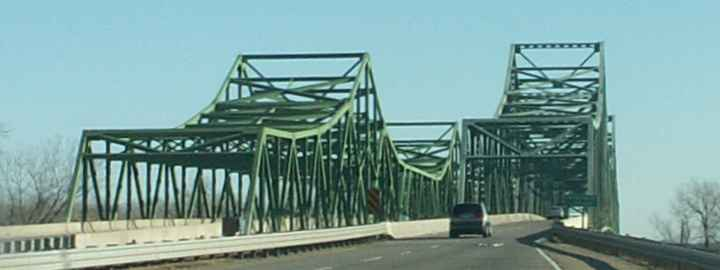
Mormon Bridge from Omaha going into Iowa. The original bridge is the east bound bridge on the right.

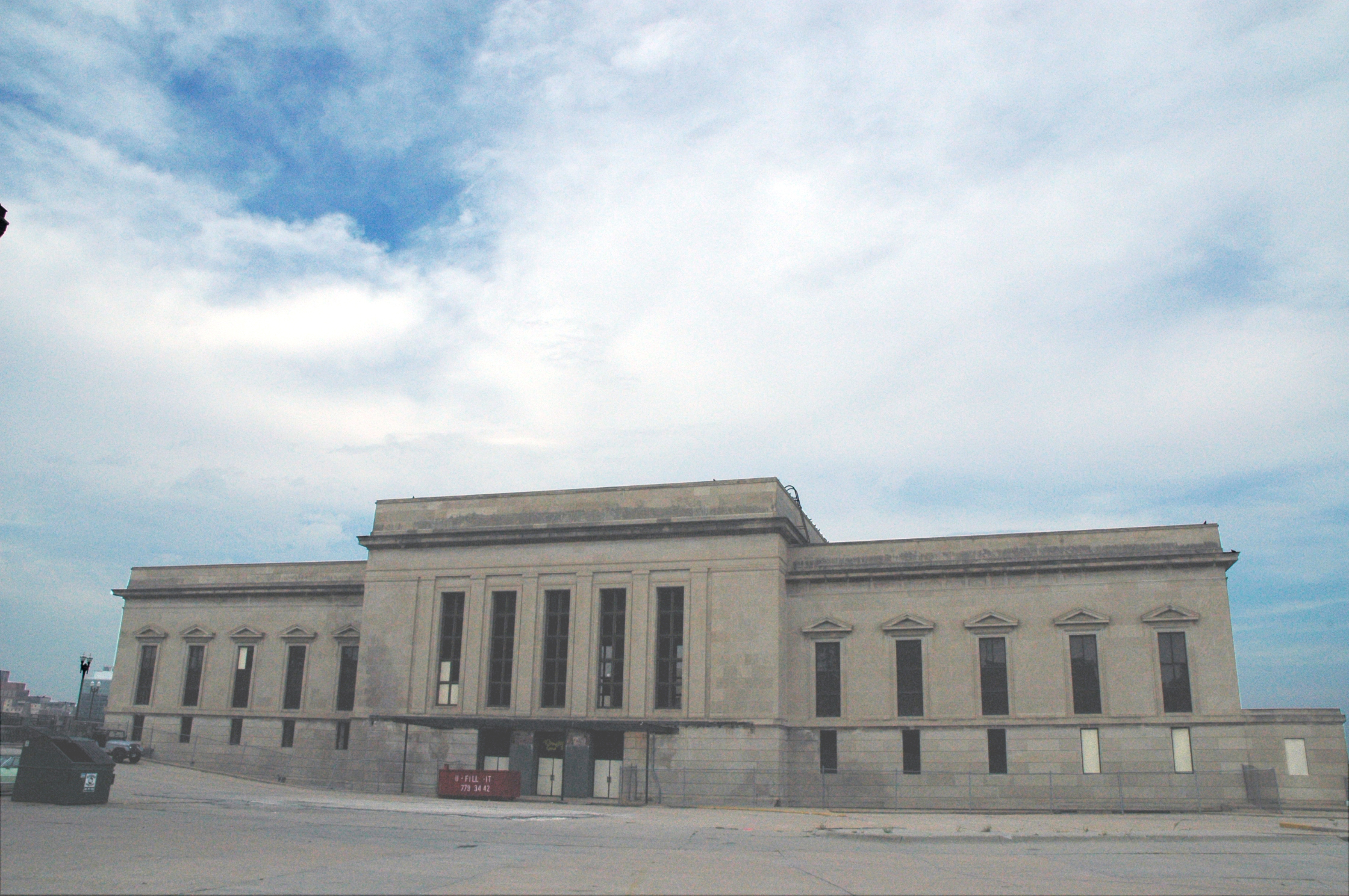
The main entrance to Omaha's Burlington Station.

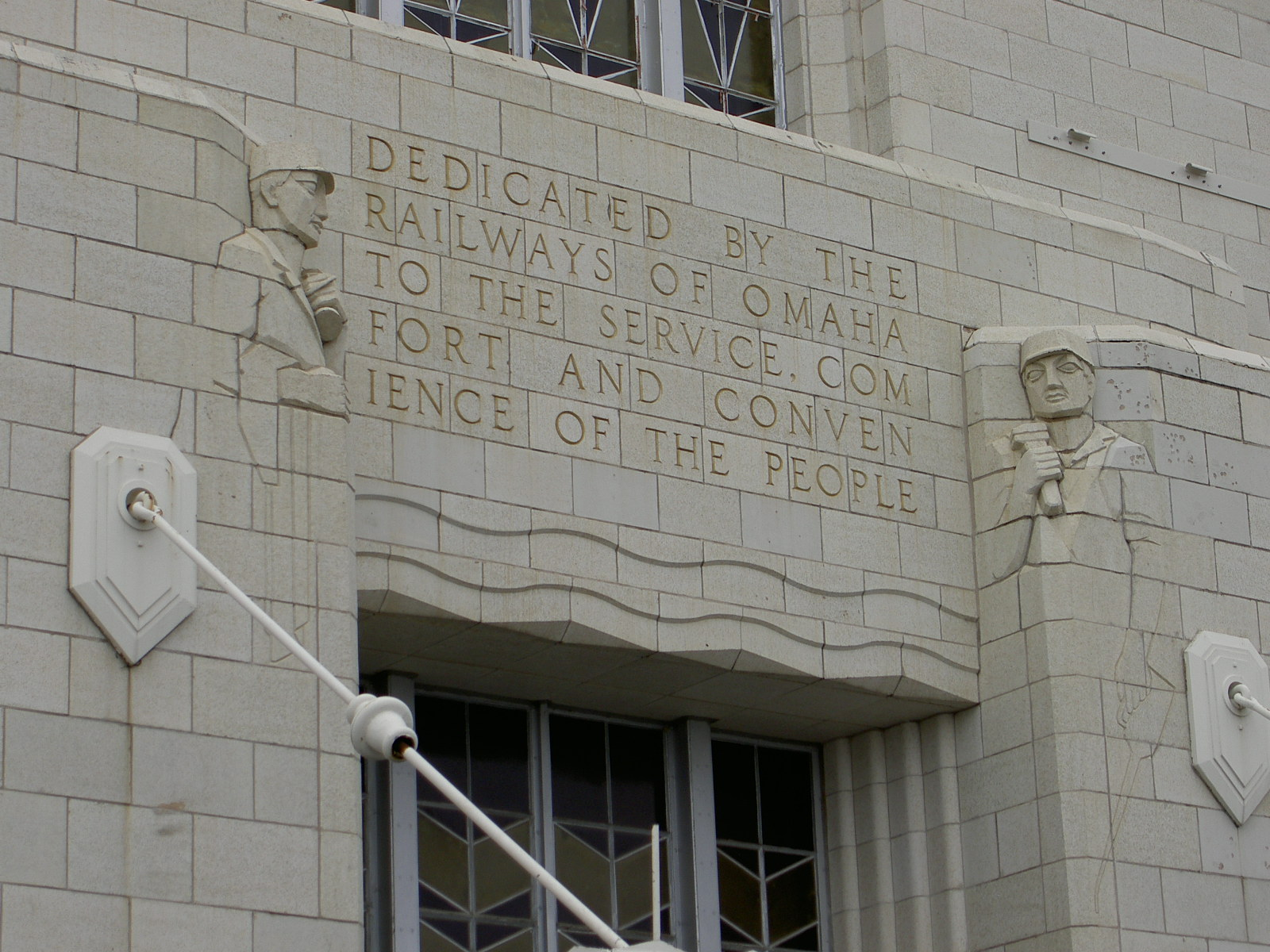
"Dedicated by the railways of Omaha the service, comfort and convenience of the people," etched in stone above an entrance to the Union Station in Omaha.

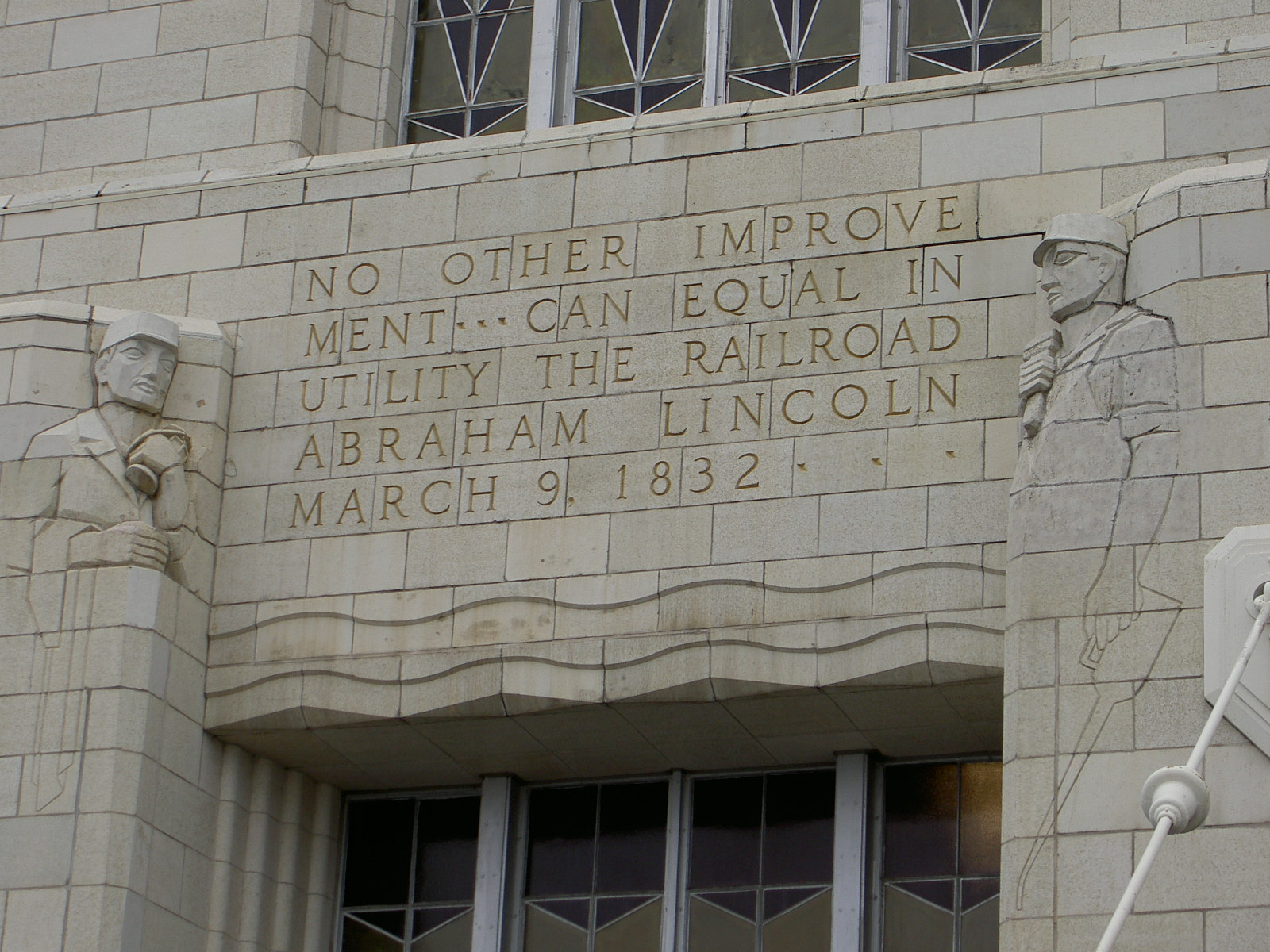
"No other improvement... can equal in utility the railroad," etched in stone above another doorway.

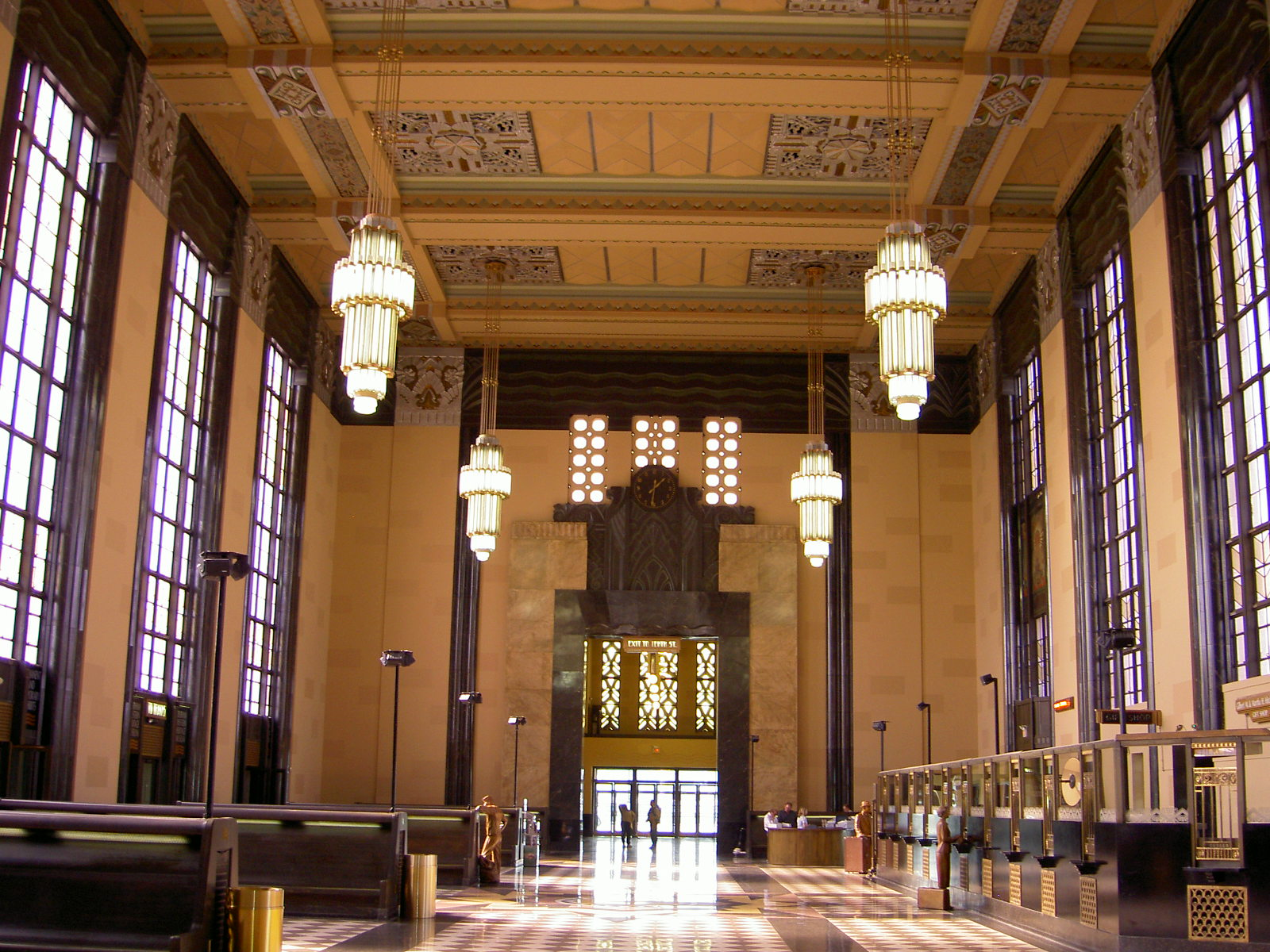
Interior of the Union Station in Omaha.

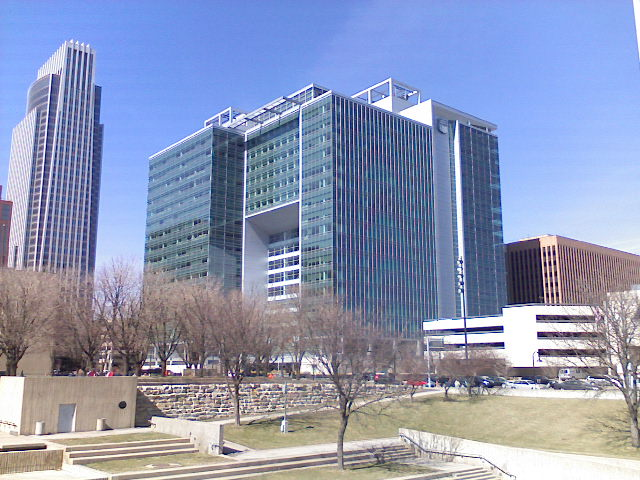
The Union Pacific Center in Downtown Omaha.

== Bibliography ==
- Raschke, W.A. (1998) "Omaha Belt Line Railway" The Eagle, 23 a journal of the Missouri Pacific Historical Society. p 20.
- Bartels, M.M. (1997) Missouri Pacific River & Prairie Rails: The MoPac in Nebraska. South Platte Press.
- Greer, D.L. (2000) Omaha Recreational Trails: Their Effect on Property Values and Public Safety. University of Nebraska at Omaha. Retrieved 9/20/07.
- RDG Martin Shukert and Ciaccio Dennell Group. (1994) A Network of Discovery: A Comprehensive Trails Plan for the State of Nebraska. Nebraska Energy Office and the Nebraska Department of Economic Development.
