= Omaha Cable Tramway Company =

The Cable Tramway Company of Omaha, Nebraska started in 1884 and ended in 1895. It was the only cable car line ever built in Omaha, and had only four lines of tracks in operation.

== History ==
The Omaha Cable Tramway Company was originally formed in 1884, and began operating in 1887. Its power house was at 20th and Harney Streets in Downtown Omaha.

Frederick Drexel, who came to Omaha in 1856, helped incorporate the Cable Tramway Company in 1887. Former Omaha mayor Ezra Millard was the first treasurer of the company when he died in 1886, and Samuel R. Johnson was the president.

The company had a bad image because of frequent disruptions in service caused by cable breakages. The cables were made of wire and hemp rope. In 1887 the company was sued by the Omaha Horse Railway for infringing on its territory after the Cable Tramway Company built tracks on the same street the railway operated on. The case was dismissed by a district court judge.

After electrically powered trams were introduced in Omaha, in April 1889 the Cable Tramway Company consolidated with the Omaha Horse Railway under the name Omaha Street Railway Company, which was then disbanded in 1896.

== See also ==
- History of Omaha
- Omaha and Council Bluffs Railway and Bridge Company
- Omaha Streetcar
- Transportation in Omaha
