= O Street Viaduct =

- Coordinates: 41°13′N 95°57′W
- Carries: O Street
- Crosses: Union Pacific railroad tracks
- Locale: South Omaha
- Owner: City of Omaha

Characteristics
- Total length: 510 ft.
- Width: 20 ft.

History
- Designer: George S. Morison
- Construction start: 1885
- Opened: 1904
- Closed: 2001

Location
- Interactive map of O Street Viaduct

The O Street Viaduct was located in the South Omaha, Nebraska. Built to accommodate O Street traversing over the Union Pacific tracks, the overpass was constructed in 1885 by interests associated with the Omaha Stockyards. It was included on the Bridges in Nebraska Multiple Property Submission on June 29, 1992. The bridge was demolished in 2001 as part of the redevelopment of the stockyards.

== See also ==
- Transportation in Omaha
- History of Omaha
