= Omaha Traction Company =

American public transportation business

- Industry: Public transportation
- Founded: 1904; 122 years ago
- Defunct: 1971
- Fate: Defunct
- Successor: Metro Area Transit
- Headquarters: Omaha and Council Bluffs
- Key people: Gurdon Wattles

The Omaha Traction Company was a privately owned public transportation business in Omaha, Nebraska. Created in the early 1900s by wealthy Omaha banker Gurdon Wattles, the company was involved in a series of contentious disputes with organized labor.

== History ==
Gurdon Wattles bought the Omaha and Council Bluffs Railway and Bridge Company, or O&CB, along with several competing local lines and merged them into one unit called the Omaha Traction Company in the early 1900s. Wattles continued using the O&CB brand. In 1943, the company began training women as streetcar operators after many of its male drivers were called into military service during World War II. The women learned quickly and were paid the same wages as their male counterparts. The company disbanded with the creation of Metro Area Transit in the early 1970s.

== Labor relations ==
The Amalgamated Association of Street and Electric Railway Employees attempted to unionize workers in Omaha Traction Company in the first decade of the 20th century with an organizer arriving in the city in 1902. That early effort faded within a year; however, Gurdon Wattles formed the Omaha Business Men's Association within the year to fight the prospect of losing the city's open shop status.

Wattles resisted any unionization within his businesses, as well as the city. When workers struck in early September 1909 he quickly hired strikebreakers from across the country to cross picket lines. He further provoked unionizers by publicly refusing arbitration in two of the city's business community's organs, the Omaha Bee and the Omaha Herald. Starting September 19, 1909 mobs rioted in the streets of downtown destroying streetcars, terrorizing company officials and attacking strikebreakers. Wattles kept the strikebreakers on, hiring others from Eastern United States cities to come in until the strikers agreed to his terms. Wattles later wrote a booklet about the events entitled A Crime Against Labor: A brief history of the Omaha and Council Bluffs Street Railway Strike, 1909. In the book he referred to the strikebreakers as, "a jolly lot of disreputables, always ready for a fight." The riots continued through September 23, 1909, eventually subsiding to the pressure of the strikebreakers.

In April 1935 the fragile truce between pro-open shop management of the Omaha Traction Company and pro-union labor forces broke, causing a long, violent strike. The company hired strikebreakers from Brooklyn and several other Eastern cities. Within days the company rolled out heavily fortified streetcars, complete with windows covered by heavy wire and armed guards on board. While few cars attracted passengers, the cars initially encountered little resistance. The company resisted calls for arbitration from the Omaha City Council and continued employing strikebreakers. In early May violence broke out, with workers attacking the streetcars and strikebreakers by rifle potshots, violent beatings, and bombings across the city.

On June 13, rioting began in which a man was killed and more than ninety persons, including women and children, were wounded. The city government lost control of the situation and asked Nebraska governor Robert Leroy Cochran to declare martial law and call in the Nebraska National Guard, which sent 103 officers and 1,273 enlisted men to restore order. The streetcars were temporarily ordered to stop running.

Governor Cochran ordered arbitration later in the week; owner Wattles agreed to arbitrate and a number of agreements were made with workers' representatives, but no substantive changes were made and strikebreakers stayed on the job. With the National Guard present, the violence quickly ended, and the troops returned home on June 21. Court cases ensued, and the situation slowly faded. However, new riots were reported by the end of the month.

The Omaha Traction Company never unionized.

== See also ==
- Transportation in Omaha
- History of Omaha
- Omaha Streetcar
