= Omaha and Council Bluffs Railway and Bridge Company =

- Industry: Public transportation
- Founded: 1886
- Defunct: 1955
- Fate: Merged
- Successor: Omaha Traction Company
- Headquarters: Omaha and Council Bluffs
- Key people: George F. Wright, Gurdon Wattles

The Omaha and Council Bluffs Railway and Bridge Company, known as O&CB, was incorporated in 1886 in order to connect Omaha, Nebraska with Council Bluffs, Iowa over the Missouri River. With a sanctioned monopoly over streetcar service in the two cities, the O&CB was among the earliest major electric street railway systems in the nation, and was one of the last streetcar operators in the U.S., making its last run in 1955.

== Background ==
The predecessor of the O&CB was the Omaha Horse Railway Company, which was incorporated by an act of the Nebraska Legislature in 1867. Electric streetcar service in Omaha is said to be the outgrowth of the 1887 Omaha Motor Railway, which was formed when the Omaha Horse Railway and the Omaha Cable Tramway Company were consolidated under the leadership of Samuel D. Mercer.

George F. Wright, builder of the 1868 Council Bluffs Street Railway company, organized the Omaha and Council Bluffs Railway and Bridge Company in 1886, along with Frank Murphy and Guy C. Barton of Omaha and John T. Stewart, Thomas J. Evans and George F. Wright of Council Bluffs. Majority stockholders included Marshall Field of Chicago and U.S. Senator Joseph Millard of Nebraska, and officials from the American Smelting Company.

The last horse car route in the city ceased operation in June 1895.

== Douglas Street Bridge ==
The O&CB's proposal for a combined wagon and railway bridge over the Missouri River was accepted by United States Congress and the Secretary of War in 1887. This led to the construction of the Douglas Street Bridge, which was later known as the Ak-Sar-Ben Bridge. The bridge was opened to traffic on October 30, 1888.

== Operations ==
After the construction of the bridge, O&CB laid out streetcar lines throughout Omaha and its suburbs, including South Omaha, Benson, Dundee, and Florence. In 1888 Wright was elected Secretary of the company, and the O&CB built the first electric street railway line ever constructed in Iowa or Nebraska. In 1898 the Omaha Street Railway, later acquired by the O&CB, ordered new cars, repaired and refurbished older cars, and allocated $100,000 for improvements to the streetcar system in anticipation of providing to and from Omaha's Trans-Mississippi Exposition. This increased the capacity of the company's power plant at 20th and Nicholas Streets.

By 1902 all of the electric-powered railways in Omaha were consolidated in the O&CB. The company was sold to a New York City-based syndicate for $4,000,000 that year, with the syndicate taking control of all stock.

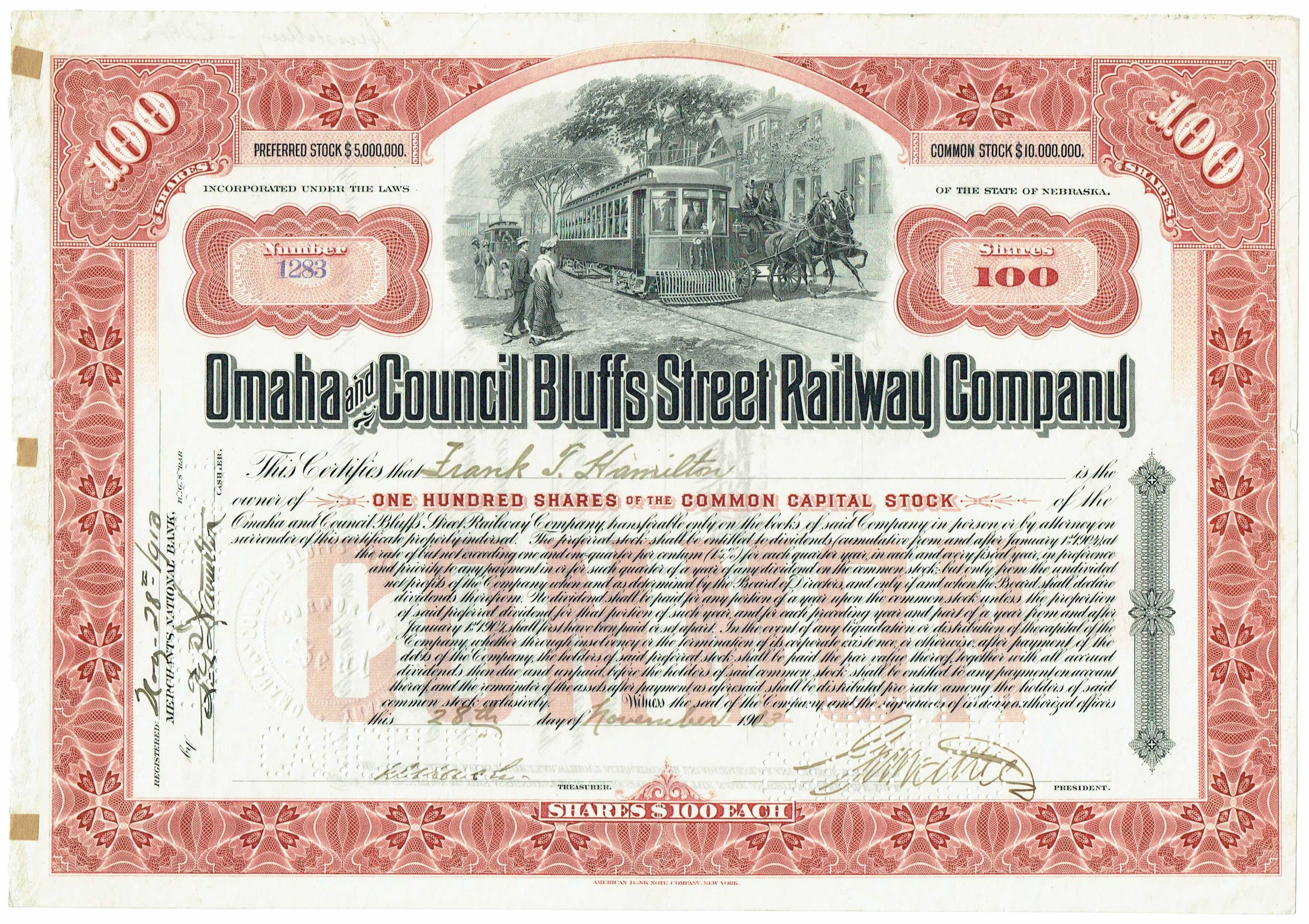
Share of the Omaha and Council Bluffs Street Railway Company, issued 28. November 1913

The Omaha and Council Bluffs Street Railway Company bought the Omaha and Council Bluffs Railway and Bridge Company in 1902, taking a hundred-year lease on the city's rails. It also consumed other local transportation franchises, including the Omaha Street Railway Company and the Council Bluffs Street Railway Company.

When local banker Gurdon Wattles bought the company along with several competing lines and merged them into one unit called the Omaha Traction Company the O&CB ceased operating as an independent line. However, Wattles continued using the brand. In 1943 the company began training women as streetcar operators after many of its male drivers were called into military service during World War II. The women learned quickly and were paid the same wages as their male counterparts.

In the late 1940s the O&CB was the target of a general boycott called by the DePorres Club, a central group in Omaha's civil rights movement. The youth-led organization targeted the railroad for its segregation practices and poor service to the Near North Side neighborhood four years before the Montgomery bus boycott.

The still-standing Omaha and Council Bluffs Street Railway Company Car Barn at the intersection of South 10th Street and Pierce Street was the last active barn in the city. The O&CB line ceased operating on March 4, 1955.

The still-standing Car Barn at South 10th Street and Pierce Street was used by the United States Postal Service. There are plans to renovate this building in the near future

There is a still-standing Sub-Station in Council Bluffs, Iowa. A streetcar is preserved, on freight car trucks, on the Northeast corner of South 11th Street and Leavenworth Street in Omaha. A streetcar, off its trucks, is preserved inside the Durham Western Heritage Museum at 801 South 10th Street in Omaha. Also a streetcar body remains as part of a cabin off Allied Road on the south side of Bellevue, NE.

== See also ==
- Omaha Cable Tramway Company
- Transportation in Omaha
- History of Omaha
- Omaha Streetcar
