= Omaha Horse Railway =

Private transportation company in early Omaha, Nebraska USA

- Industry: Public transportation
- Founded: 1867
- Defunct: 1889
- Fate: Merged
- Successor: Omaha and Council Bluffs Railway and Bridge Company
- Headquarters: Omaha
- Key people: Ezra Millard, Andrew J. Hanscom, Augustus Kountze, William W. Marsh

The Omaha Horse Railway was a private transportation company in early Omaha, Nebraska. The company was founded in 1867 by Omaha pioneers Ezra Millard, Andrew J. Hanscom and Augustus Kountze to provide horsecar service in the city. On February 19 of that year the Nebraska Territory Legislature awarded the company a 50-year franchise and exclusive rights to run tracks on Omaha's streets in its closing session. The company was noted for an 1888 United States District Court trial in which they sued another company for infringing on the exclusive rights to Omaha's streets granted to them by the Nebraska Territory Legislature.

== History ==
The first formal meeting of the directors was held at the Omaha National Bank on May 1, 1867. In the years following the founding of the company through the mid-1870s a boon period presided in Omaha, bringing the foundation of several businesses important to the city's growth, including the Horse Railway. The city expanded from 12 square miles (31 km^{2}) to 24 within 15 years, and the Horse Railway struggled to keep up with it. The company switched from horses to mules and painted their cars yellow in an attempt to strengthen their image. By the late 1870s the line had 18 miles (29 km) of track, 10 cars, 70 horses, 20 employees and 495,000 passengers annually. After the company hit hard times in the mid to late 1870s, William W. Marsh purchased a controlling interest in the company from A.J. Hanscom. His purchase was effective January 1, 1879.

In 1887 the Omaha Cable Tramway Company was founded, leaving the Horse Railway with a competitor. The companies merged in 1889. In 1888 the Horse Railway Company took the Cable Tramway Company and the City of Omaha to court on the grounds they violated the Horse Railway's exclusive 50-year franchise allotted to them by the Territorial Legislature. The City of Omaha held a public vote that gave the Cable Tramway the ability to compete, in violation of the Legislature's act. The courts found for the Cable Tramway Company, allowing them to share the streets; however, they did order the Cable Tramway Company repay the Horse Railway for losses due to intrusion upon that company's lines. The case was exceptional because the courts ruled that the exclusivity clause granted the rights to the company operating horse railways, not cable cars. This interpretation allowed for competition in a formerly monopolized market, and was credited with changing the economic landscape of American public transportation thereafter.

By 1902 the company that was formed became the Omaha and Council Bluffs Railway and Bridge Company, after the consolidation of several competitors in the previous 20 years.

== Routes ==
When they incorporated the company the Legislature specified that the road should be built by 1869. After awarding the contract ground was broken for the first route from Cuming street south to Cass street, jogging to 18th and then along Capitol Avenue to South 15th. At Farnam it turned east and traveled to 9th to the Union Station, a total distance of about three miles (5 km).

A double track was laid on Farnam Street from 10th to 15th, and another from North 20th Street along Cuming to Saunders Street, following that street to Hamilton. Another track went from Cuming Street and 20th to 18th Street, following that street northwards to Kountze Place in what was then the extreme northern part of the city. A line ran from Capitol Avenue up North 16th Street to Izard Street, and Izard to 18th where it connected with the line running to Kountze Place. In the south end of Downtown Omaha a track was laid from Farnam Street to 9th Street to Davenport, and from there to 10th to Farnam again. A track was then laid from Farnam down 15th and out Howard and St. Mary's Avenue to Hanscom Park.

== See also ==
- Railroads in Omaha
- Transportation in Omaha
