= Gurdon Wattles =

Businessman who bankrolled much of early Hollywood

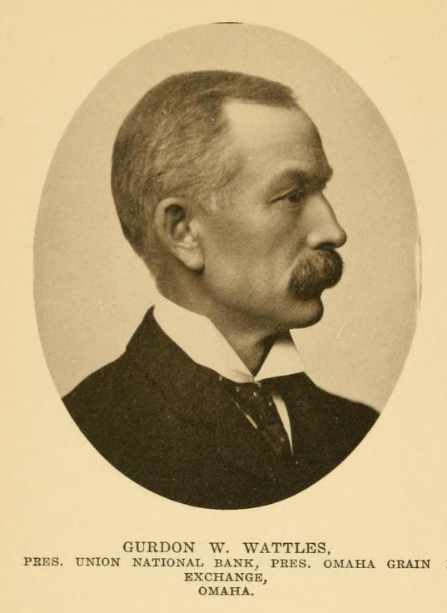
- Gurdon Wattles in 1904
- Born: May 12, 1855; Richford, New York
- Died: January 31, 1932 (aged 76); Hollywood, California
- Occupations: Banker, civic leader
- Known for: Financing early Hollywood

Gurdon Wallace Wattles (May 12, 1855 - January 31, 1932) was an early businessman, banker, and civic leader in Omaha, Nebraska, who became responsible for bankrolling much of early Hollywood. Wattles was said to possess "all the right credentials to direct Omaha's fortunes for the twentieth century in the post-pioneer era: humble beginnings, outstanding ability, a fine intellect, impeccable manners, driving ambition, and a ruthless streak."

== Personal life ==
Gurdon Wallace Wattles was the third son of James Wattles and Elizabeth Whitton. He was born on May 12, 1855, in the town of Richford, New York, and died on January 31, 1932, in Hollywood, California. He was the grandson of Dr. Tower Whitton, a 1796 graduate of Dartmouth College.

His first name, Gurdon, was derived from his ancestor Brampton Gurdon, who was a member of Parliament for Sudbury (1621) and high sheriff of Suffolk. His daughter, Muriel Gurdon, married Richard Saltonstall Jr., the son of Sir Richard Saltonstall Sr., who led a group of English settlers up the Charles River to settle in what is now Watertown, Massachusetts, in 1630.

He was a descendant of Mayflower passengers Elder William Brewster and John Howland. He was also a descendant of John Lothropp, an English Anglican clergyman who became a Congregationalist minister and emigrant to New England. Lothropp was the founder of Barnstable, Massachusetts. Wattles was also a descendant of John Mason, an English army major, a deputy governor of Connecticut, and the principal founder of Norwich, Connecticut. One of Wattles' distant relatives from his father's side is Edward Everett, an American politician and president of Harvard University.

Wattles' father served as a lieutenant in the 109th New York Volunteer Infantry Regiment during the War of the Rebellion, and after the war, he decided to move the family. They traveled in a covered wagon settling in Glidden, Iowa, in 1868. Wattles graduated from high school there, and soon after became a teacher for several years to finance his college education. During the summer before his junior year at Iowa Agricultural College in 1878, Wattles’s lungs began to bleed and he was told by a physician that he suffered from consumption (the same disease by which his brother and sister had died). “Thus ended my college training”. After losing re-election in 1880 for a second two-year term as county superintendent of schools, Wattles was motivated to complete his legal studies. “I then entered the law office of Thomas F Barbee of Carroll, Iowa, and soon was admitted to the bar.” Twenty-seven years later, Iowa State University would confer upon Wattles the honorary degree of Master of Philosophy for “worthy achievements”.

Wattles married Abigail Jane Leete, known as "Jennie", on October 20, 1882, in her hometown of Clarksville, Iowa. They met while attending at Iowa Agricultural College. Jennie was the daughter of Allen N. Leete and Abigail Button, and a direct descendant of Governor William Leete, who was governor of the Colony of New Haven from 1661 to 1665 and governor of Connecticut from 1676 to 1683. She was born about 1858 in Clarksville, Iowa, and died on May 25, 1916, at Presbyterian Hospital in Chicago, Illinois. They were the parents of three children: Frederick Leete Wattles, Margaret Elizabeth Wattles, and Mary Louise Wattles.

Wattles married Julia Vance at Estes Park, Colorado, on June 26, 1918. She was born at Milford, Nebraska, on August 23, 1883, the daughter of Alexander Hamilton Vance. She died in November 1977 in Los Angeles. She studied for three years at Doane College, and was a graduate of both Oberlin College and Columbia College. She was the director of the home economics department at the University of Nebraska when she met Gurdon Wattles. She gave birth to a son, Gurdon Wallace Wattles Jr., on May 5, 1920, at their home in Hollywood.

== Career ==
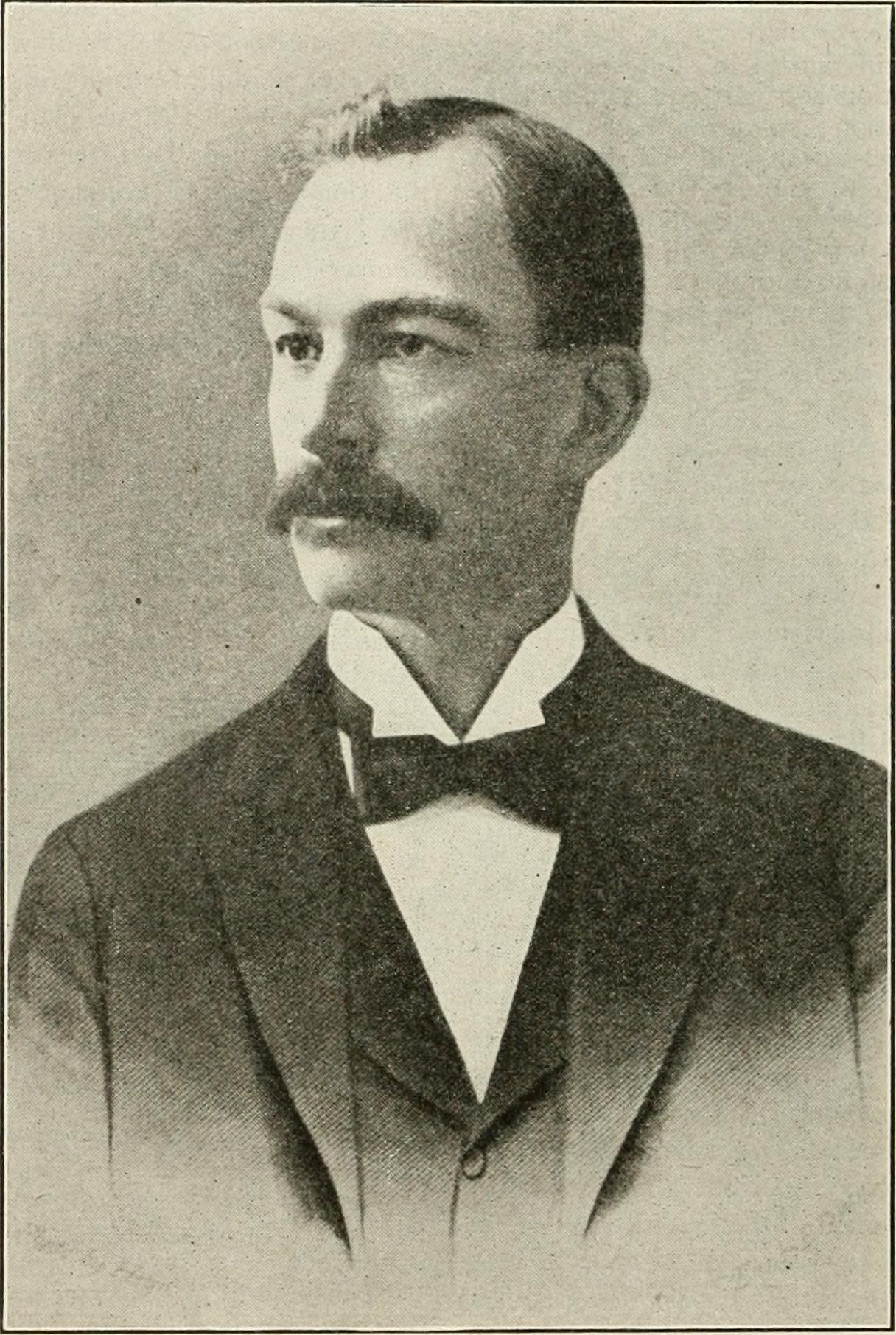
Gurdon W. Wattles

After graduating from college and joining the bar, Wattles joined a law firm in Carroll, Iowa. Soon after, he convinced his parents to move there, and at their behest, he donated a lot to the Trinity Episcopal Church congregation to build an edifice. In 1882 Wattles first ventured into banking by working with silent partners to found the Farmer's Bank in Carroll. Focusing directly on assisting the many German immigrants who wanted to farm in eastern Nebraska during this time, the Farmer's Bank "prospered beyond our fondest hopes." After arriving in Omaha in 1892 Wattles became the vice-president of the city's Union National Bank.

By 1901, Wattles had consolidated all the independent streetcar lines in Omaha into one company called the Omaha and Council Bluffs Streetcar Company, which later became the Omaha Traction Company. In 1903, he helped organize the Omaha Grain Exchange and the Omaha Business Men's Association, a group organized to keep labor unions out of Omaha and maintain open shops. In 1905, Wattles became the president, and then the chairman of the board of the United States National Bank of Omaha, serving until 1920. Also in 1905, Wattles was the lead of Nebraska's exhibit at the Louisiana Purchase Exposition in St. Louis, Missouri. There, he pioneered the use of filmed footage for advertising. Wattles was a director of the Chicago Great Western Railroad, and was responsible for the construction of the Omaha landmark Hotel Fontenelle in 1914.

A long-time member of the exclusive Omaha Club, Wattles maintained a sleeping room there after permanently relocating his family to "Jualita", their California estate, in January 1922. It became his Omaha residence when he returned for business dealings.

== Trans-Mississippi and International Exposition ==
In 1897, Wattles became the organizer and chairman of the Trans-Mississippi and International Exposition and Indian Congress. His leadership is credited with bringing over 2.6 million people to Omaha to view the 4,062 exhibits during the five months of the exposition. When President William McKinley visited, Wattles introduced him to the crowd of nearly 100,000 assembled on the plaza. Wattles' expo stretched over a 180-acre (0.73 km^{2}) tract in North Omaha and featured a 2,000-foot (610 m)-long lagoon encircled by 21 classical buildings that featured fine and modern products from around the world. During the grand parade for the expo, Wattles rode alongside William Jennings Bryan, a three-time candidate for president of the United States, who was also a close friend. This event enhanced Wattles' influence across Nebraska and throughout the Midwestern United States.

== Politics ==
Wattles was elected delegate to the Republican National Convention in 1904. There he voted for Theodore Roosevelt for president, and when he became a member of the notification committee from Nebraska, he visited Roosevelt at his home in Oyster Bay, New York. Their friendship lasted until Roosevelt died in 1919. Wattles was appointed the Federal Food Administrator for Nebraska by Herbert Hoover during World War I.

== Honors ==
In an elaborate ceremony, Wattles was crowned King of the Knights of Ak-Sar-Ben in 1905. The Iowa State College awarded him an honorary degree in the 1910s.

== Wattles House ==
Noted Omaha architect Thomas Rogers Kimball designed the Wattles House in the popular historical revival Chateauesque style. It was built in 1895. Today, the majority of the house retains its historical significance. It has been listed as an Omaha Landmark and is a contributing building in the Gold Coast Historic District, listed on the National Register of Historic Places. Wattles lived in the residence from 1896 to 1921. In January 1922 he moved permanently to Hollywood, California.

== Wattles Mansion ==
In April 1905, Wattles purchased ninety acres in Hollywood, California to build a home for rest and recreation. The land reached from Hollywood Boulevard back into a spur of the Sierra Madre Mountains. Noted local architects Myron Hunt and Elmer Grey designed the Mission Revival residence in 1907. Known by the Spanish name “Jualita” the grounds featured a Japanese garden, an Italian rose garden, a formal Spanish garden, a palm court, and orchards. The extant mansion has been recognized as "the only remaining intact example of the once plentiful Hollywood estates from the period preceding the film industry, when Hollywood was primarily agricultural and was a wintering home for wealthy Easterners and Midwesterners."

Wattles permanently relocated his family to their new California home in January 1922, and opened an office in the Hellman Bank Building at 7th and Spring Street in downtown Los Angeles. Around this time, Wattles befriended fellow Iowa émigré Margaret J Anderson and provided her with business advice and assistance in establishing the Beverly Hills Hotel, “...in those early days when Hollywood was young and Beverly Hills was in its infancy.”

== See also ==
- History of Omaha
