= Florence station (Nebraska) =

Railroad Museum in Omaha

Coordinates: 41°20′32″N 95°57′39″W

Florence Depot

General information
- Location: 9000 North 30th Street; Omaha, Nebraska, United States
- Owner: Florence Historical Foundation
- Line: Omaha Belt Line

History
- Opened: 1887
- Rebuilt: 1976

Services
Preceding station	Chicago and North Western Railway	Following station
Fort Calhoun toward Sioux City	Sioux City – Omaha (Omaha Road)	Omaha (Webster Street) Terminus
Location

The Florence Depot at 9000 North 30th Street in the Florence community of Omaha, Nebraska. Originally built in 1887 at 28th and Grebe in downtown Florence, the Depot closed in 1966. It was moved to its present location in 1971, and has been used as a historical railroad museum since 1976.

The depot is operated by the Florence Historical Foundation and features exhibits about the local railroads and the depot's history. The site also features an 1890 caboose and a flat car.

== About ==
Constructed in 1888 as part of a train line from Omaha to Sioux City, the Florence Depot was used as a commuter station, mail drop off and large cargo such as coal, lumber, stone and ice.

== See also ==
- History of North Omaha, Nebraska
