= Webster Street station =

Former train station in Nebraska

General information
- Location: Webster Street and Saddle Creek Road
- Lines: Missouri Pacific Railway: Omaha Belt Line

History
- Opened: 1887

Services
Preceding station	Chicago and North Western Railway	Following station
Florence toward Sioux City	Sioux City – Omaha (Omaha Road)	Terminus

The Webster Street station was a train station located at Webster and North 15th Streets in Omaha, Nebraska, United States. Located on the Omaha Belt Line, which was operated by the Omaha Road and the Missouri Pacific Railroad as a local railroad passenger depot, the station was built in 1887. In 1902 the New York Times noted the station for its innovations in the treatment of passenger luggage.

The Swedes in Omaha used the Webster Street Station to connect with their ethnic communities in Oakland, Pender, Wakefield, and Wausa.
