= Plug-in electric vehicles in Nebraska =

As of September 2022, there were about 2,600 electric vehicles in Nebraska, equivalent to 0.2% of all vehicles in the state.

== Government policy ==
As of April 2022, the state government offers tax rebates of up to $4,000 for electric vehicle purchases.

As of 2022, the state government charges a $75 annual registration fee for electric vehicles. Including all fees and taxes, EV drivers pay approximately $78 more in tax every year than similar fossil-fuel powered car drivers.

Politicians who have led the effort to implement these fees have been found to have received significant funding from the oil and gas industry. In addition, organizations funded by the oil and gas industry, such as ALEC, are actively pushing for fee increases.

== Charging stations ==
As of April 2022, there were 181 public charging station locations with 383 charging ports in Nebraska.

The Infrastructure Investment and Jobs Act, signed into law in November 2021, allocates US$30 million to charging stations in Nebraska.

As of 2022, the state government recognizes the following highways as potential "alternative fuel corridors", with charging stations every 50 miles (80 km): I-80, US-6, and NE-31.

== By region ==
=== Lincoln ===
As of 2020, there were about 500 electric vehicles registered in Lincoln.
