= Andrew J. Hanscom =

American lawyer

1st Speaker of the Nebraska Territorial House of Representatives
- In office January 16, 1855 – March 16, 1855
- Preceded by: Position created
- Succeeded by: Potter C. Sullivan

Personal details
- Born: February 3, 1828 Pontiac, Michigan
- Died: September 11, 1907 (aged 79) New York City
- Occupation: Lawyer, politician

Andrew Jackson Hanscom (February 3, 1828 – September 11, 1907) was a pioneer, lawyer, politician, and real estate broker from Omaha, Nebraska.

== Biography ==
Born in Pontiac, Michigan, Andrew was the youngest child of Irving Hanscom, a pioneer of Macomb County, Michigan. He was sent to Detroit for elementary school, and later completed high school there, as well. At 17 Hanscom attended Antioch College in Yellow Springs, Ohio, and during this period he served as first lieutenant of Company C., First Michigan Infantry, during the Mexican–American War. While in Mexico Hanscom commanded Thomas B. Cuming, which would be helpful again to him in the future.

After the war Hanscom came to Council Bluffs, Iowa and opened a mercantile. In 1854 he attended July 4 picnic during which the city was founded. That year he moved across the Missouri River and built a claim shack and small frame building near 15th and Farnam Streets in present-day Downtown Omaha. When Alfred Jones surveyed Omaha later that year he divided it into 320 blocks, after which point Hanscom discovered his claim had been reserved for schools. He quickly traded the land for a 400-acre (1.6 km^{2}) claim belonging to Colonel Sam Bayliss. Late that year Hanscom was appointed colonel of the First Nebraska Regiment, and he helped found the Omaha Claim Club.

=== Legislative service ===
While working for A.J. Poppleton's law firm, he served as speaker of the first House of Representatives of the Nebraska Territory in 1855. He quickly made enemies within the House as a strong anti-slavery advocate, and clashed strongly with those of differing views, including J. Sterling Morton. As the speaker he was also the unofficial leader of the Omaha promoters in the House.

Hanscom is attributed as being responsible for stoking a feud between Omaha City and Nebraska City over where a statehood convention would be located. An 1855 motion by Hanscom to designate Omaha City as the place for holding the first statehood convention in 1859 was lost by a vote of 15 to 19. A following motion by Milton W. Reynolds, of Otoe County to bring that event to Nebraska City was carried by 21 to 13. However, Hanscom led a motion to reconsider the next day, which brought the vote in at 21 to 15. Immediately before the vote Hanscom led a motion to substitute "the capital of the territory" without roll call.

==== House brawl ====
In January 1858 another battle ensued when a bill was introduced that would move the state capital away from Omaha to a new, non-existent town. While this had happened every year since the capital was located in Omaha in 1854, it was different this time because Omaha did not have the votes to stop it. Convening in private, political leaders in the city could not decide which method to use to stop the vote. Hanscom proposed violence, and was taken seriously. The scheme led to a large-scale breakdown on the House floor, including a fight between almost all the members of the body. Hanscom led the events, with his ally Poppleton and others throwing fists and chairs and virtually demolishing the chambers. These events led to the illegal convening of several anti-Omaha legislators in the notorious Florence session, in which they called for a new government to rule on the proceedings. The acting governor Thomas B. Cuming ruled that the capital would not leave Omaha and the session ended before any further antics could happen. Omaha remained as the Nebraska capital until statehood in 1867, when it was ceded to Lincoln. Hanscom was on the committee that wrote the Nebraska State Constitution.

=== Later life ===
Hanscom continued to live in Omaha and became wealthy as a real estate and securities broker in the city. In 1872 he donated 72 acres (290,000 m^{2}) to the City of Omaha which became Hanscom Park. His motives were suspect because his company, the Omaha Horse Railway, ended its line at that location, which was undeveloped after several years. However, within a few years Hanscom Park was lauded for its beauty and was the primary park in Omaha. It still serves as a park in Omaha.

Hanscom lived at the Fifth Avenue Hotel in New York City for several years before his death. Hanscom died of pneumonia in 1907 and was buried in Omaha.

== See also ==
- History of Omaha
