= Omaha Streetcar =

Streetcar system in Omaha, Nebraska, US

Overview
- Other name: Oscar
- Status: Under construction
- Owner: City of Omaha, Nebraska
- Locale: Omaha, Nebraska, U.S.
- Stations: 13
- Website: omahastreetcar.org

Service
- Type: Streetcar
- Services: 1
- Rolling stock: CAF Urbos

History
- Planned opening: 2028

Technical
- Line length: 3.0 mi (4.8 km)
- Character: Streetcar in mixed traffic

The Omaha Streetcar is a streetcar system under construction in Omaha, Nebraska, United States. It is estimated to be completed in 2028.

== History ==
=== Background ===
The Omaha-Council Bluffs streetcar era began operations in 1868. By 1890, the metropolitan area had 90 miles (140 km) of tracks — more than any city except Boston. The Omaha Traction Company was the dominant private streetcar provider of the time; it was engulfed in repeated labor disputes. By 1955, the city closed its streetcar system in favor of buses.

=== Planning and development ===
In 2009, the City of Omaha and Heritage Services developed a Downtown Omaha Masterplan to improve the Omaha downtown area by 2030. The transportation element of the Omaha Master Plan was completed in 2012, and included a bus rapid transit (BRT) and other non-car transit as part of the transportation blueprints. In 2013 as part of a central Omaha transit analysis, SB Friedman Development Advisors forecast central Omaha development impacts from improved transit. The Friedman analysis compared streetcar projects from Portland, Seattle, and Tampa to BRT alternatives from Cleveland and Kansas City, estimating the streetcar increases development by $1 billion and the BRT alternative by $262 million. However, the Friedman analysis ignored Portland's $725 million, Seattle's $1 billion, and Tampa's $165 million in direct subsidies to developers, calling into question if streetcar economic impact differs from other modes of transportation. The central Omaha transit alternatives analysis was completed in 2014, narrowing down the alternatives to a BRT or streetcar system along Farnam and Harney or a Farnam Contraflow route.

2014 Central Omaha Transit Alternatives Analysis Final Screening Summary
Criteria	Alternative 1	Alternative 2	Alternative 2A	Alternative 3	Alternative 3A
Criteria	BRT	BRT		Streetcar	
Criteria	Dodge/Douglas Couplet	Farnam/Harney Couplet	Farnam Contraflow	Farnam/Harney Couplet	Farnam Contraflow
RIDERSHIP
Ridership	1,180 passengers	1,430 passengers		1,380 passengers	
CAPITAL COSTS
Capital Cost (2013)	$36,638,000	$37,196,000	$42,543,000	$141,386,000	$141,724,000
Annualized capital cost	$2,007,000	$2,037,000	$2,330,000	$7,745,000	$7,763,000
Cost per mile	$6,242,000	$6,048,000	$7,102,000	$42,331,000	$44,567,000
OPERATION AND MAINTENANCE COST (O&M)
Annual O&M Cost (2013)	$2,647,486	$2,681,234		$6,883,515	
COST BENEFIT
Cost per user	$3.94	$3.30	$3.50	$10.60	$10.61
RECOMMENDATION	Eliminate	Advance	Advance	Advance	Advance

During her re-election campaign in April 2017, Mayor Jean Stothert said voters should decide the streetcar's future, hoping to put it on the November 2018 ballot, "I've always wanted the people to be the final decision," the mayor said. "That's nothing different." In the 2019 to 2020 election cycle Stothert received: $10,000 from HDR Inc., an engineering firm advocating for streetcars nationwide, and $5,000 from Kutak Rock LLP, a legal firm with specialists in Tax Increment Financing (TIF).

Representative Don Bacon was unsuccessful in obtaining an $8 million earmark for the project in 2021.

In 2022, a revised plan was announced by Mayor Jean Stothert and the Greater Omaha Chamber of Commerce's Urban Core Committee.

State Senator Justin Wayne, champion of TIF legislation for 'extremely blighted' areas of the state, questioned the use of TIF for the streetcar saying “For them to extremely blight that area is a slap in the face to North and South Omaha," citing multimillion-dollar investment and renovation projects going on in the urban core of the state's biggest city, “In no way is downtown Omaha extremely blighted.”

At the December 6, 2022, Omaha City Council meeting Thomas Rubin, CPA, CMA, CMC, CIA, CGFM, CFM, a transit industry senior executive, consultant, and auditor with four decades experience in transportation and an Omaha native provided a presentation. Rubin states the Omaha Rapid Bus Transit (ORBT) excels over the proposed streetcar line on almost all standard transportation measures: going over three times as far west to serve more potential riders and destinations, faster operating speed, and more trips/day – and at a far lower cost that does not require hundreds of millions of dollars of additional taxpayer capital. Rubin also highlights, per HDR analysis, the Omaha streetcar achieved most of the development potential already since ORBT began operations two years ago with two-thirds of the growth development ability of the proposed streetcar in the development corridor under study. On December 13, 2022, the Omaha City Council approved $440 million in bonds to fund the streetcar, $360 million TIF bonds and $80 million from lease purchase bonds. The City of Omaha published a plan to pay back the $600 million needed, $440 million principle plus $160 million in interest, by: first, diverting $421 million from $2.2 billion in new TIF subsidized projects in the streetcar district; second, diverting $71 million from existing development in the streetcar district; and third, diverting $115 million from existing TIF subsidized projects by extending those TIFs 5 years for a total of $607 million in diverted property taxes. Subsequently, investor Warren Buffett, an Omaha resident and owner of Berkshire Hathaway, published a letter to the editor in the Omaha World-Herald to oppose the street project. He cited its cost and inflexibility compared to a bus system.

The streetcar would run on a three-mile (4.8 km) route from Cass to Farnam on South 10th Street, Farnam west to 42nd Street, and back to 10th Street on Harney. The streetcar was originally expected to be operational in 2026, and free for all riders. On June 12, 2023 streetcar officials stated plans to hire an outside company to run the streetcar, as Omaha has no one capable, and moved the beginning of operations to spring 2027. While future expansions north, south, and west in Omaha and Council Bluffs, Iowa, have been proposed, Omaha city planning stated an alternatives analysis has yet to be completed on any proposal and would take a total of 8 to 10 years once started.

Utility relocation work along the route began in September 2023.

At a June 18, 2024 news conference Omaha Mayor Jean Stothert and Omaha Streetcar Authority Chairman and developer Jay Noddle updated streetcar corridor costs to $459 million, with $39 million of the increase to be paid by city sewer fees, and a potential cost-sharing agreement with Nebraska Department of Transportation to cover about $21.5 million in bridge replacement costs.

Nebraska State Auditor Mike Foley issued a 26-page advisory letter to the Nebraska Unicameral on the increased use of TIF in Nebraska and highlighted Omaha's streetcar project summarizing “My purpose for discussing the ‘Streetcar Project’ in the letter is not to criticize or pass judgement on this half-billion dollar undertaking, which uses TIF on over 1,100 parcels of prime real estate,” Foley stated. “It is merely to shed light on the potential impact of the financing techniques being employed to fund it. In the final analysis, construction of the ‘Streetcar Project’ will be anything but free.” In that same advisory, Foley noted that during the time property taxes are diverted to pay off costs of a redevelopment project, those property taxes are not available for public education and other local services.

City of Omaha announced a new projected operational date of 2028.

2025 Omaha mayoral candidate Mike McDonnell proposed a referendum allowing residents to decide whether to continue the streetcar project, even though opponents, including Douglas County Treasure John Ewing, Candidate Jasmine Harris, and Mayor Jean Stothert, argue that it is too late to halt the project.

In September 2025, Omaha's Metropolitan Utilities District (MUD) sought a payment plan to protect ratepayers and the utility district from shouldering a significant increase in streetcar-related construction costs. Omaha has called for a way to monitor MUD's streetcar expenses, stating the city was blindsided by the cost of the utility district's first phases of work. As part of the 2026 budget and capital improvement program, the City of Omaha approved an additional $61 million in non-bond funding for the streetcar project for the first time, with $35 million from the Sewer Revenue Improvement fund. City of Omaha Public Works Director Robert Stubbe confirmed non-bond funding for the streetcar would be used during Omaha Street Car Authority's 2026 budget deliberation, Resolution 2025–031.

On February 24, 2026, the Omaha City Council held a public hearing on an additional $70 million in lease-purchase bonds for the streetcar project. During the meeting, Deputy Chief of Staff Economic Development Steve Jensen stated that the administration did not expect to issue more than approximately $490 million in streetcar-related bonds in total, explaining the additional authorization was intended in part to allow the city to shift a portion of the planned financing from 20 year TIF revenue bonds to 40-year lease-purchase bonds. The following table summarizes streetcar related bond ordinances adopted since 2022:

Omaha streetcar–related bond ordinances
Ordinance	Date passed	Type of bonds	"Not to exceed" amount	New money or amendment	Notes
ORD 43221	December 13, 2022	Tax increment financing (TIF) revenue bonds	US$360,000,000	New authorization	Master TIF bond ordinance for the streetcar project; payable from TIF revenues.
ORD 43220	December 13, 2022	Lease‑revenue bonds (via Omaha Public Facilities Corporation)	US$80,000,000	New authorization	First lease‑revenue tranche for streetcar facility and equipment.
ORD 43636	December 19, 2023	N/A (amendment only)	N/A	Amends ORD 43220	Extends maximum maturity to 40 years; does not add new money.
ORD 43637	December 19, 2023	Lease‑revenue bonds (master lease‑purchase)	US$50,000,000	New authorization	Establishes master lease‑purchase framework for the 2024 project.
ORD 44355	July 29, 2025	Lease‑revenue bonds, Series 2025C	US$65,000,000	New authorization	Third supplemental indenture; provides financing for the 2025 project.
ORD 44611	February 2026 (proposed)	Lease‑revenue bonds, Series 2026D	US$70,000,000	New authorization	Fourth supplemental indenture; provides financing for the 2026 project.

City Councilman Brinker Harding stated during the public hearing that he holds no personal equity stake in land within the streetcar district. Harding is also a senior vice president at Colliers International in Omaha, a commercial real estate firm that specializes in investment sales and landlord representation in the local market.

In August 2026, renderings of the Omaha Streetcar were shared by the Omaha Streetcar Authority, which showed that the final design will have an orange, white, and blue color scheme. It was also announced that the streetcar will be nicknamed Oscar as a shortening of the words, "Omaha Streetcar".

== Rolling stock ==
In February 2024, it was announced that the line will use six CAF Urbos streetcars similar to those currently in use in Kansas City and Cincinnati. Funding was approved in May of that year.

== See also ==
- Light rail in the United States
- Streetcars in North America
- Transportation in Omaha
- General Motors streetcar conspiracy
