= Ezra Millard =

American politician

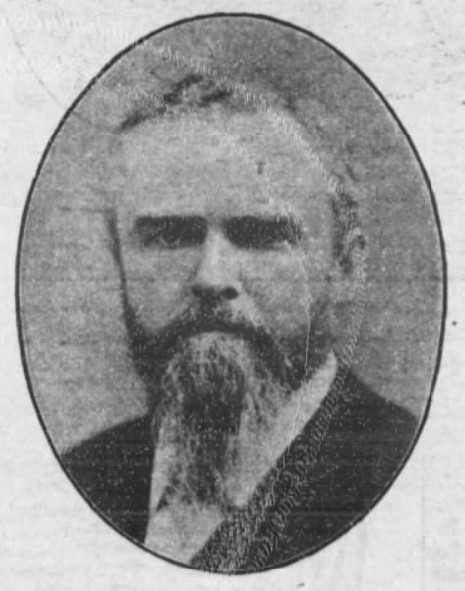

Mayor of Omaha
- In office 1869–1871
- Preceded by: George M. Roberts
- Succeeded by: Smith Samuel Caldwell

Personal details
- Born: February 2, 1833
- Died: August 20, 1886 (aged 53) Saratoga Springs, New York
- Party: Democratic

Ezra Millard (February 2, 1833 – August 20, 1886) was a U.S. politician who was mayor of Omaha, Nebraska, from 1869 to 1871. He was also brother to Joseph Millard, another mayor of Omaha, and namesake of Millard, Nebraska.

Millard died in Saratoga Springs, New York of heart complications in 1886. At the time of his death he was employed as the treasurer of the Omaha Cable Tramway Company.

| Preceded by George M. Roberts | Mayor of Omaha; 1869–1871 | Succeeded by Smith Samuel Caldwell |
