= Omaha Belt Line =

19th Century train line in Nebraska

Overview
- Locale: Omaha, Nebraska
- Dates of operation: 1883–Early 1960s

The Omaha Belt Line was a 15-mile (24 km) long railroad that circumnavigated Omaha, Nebraska, starting in 1885. The organization behind the line, called the Omaha Belt Railway, was incorporated two years earlier, in 1883. Carrying passengers and cargo, the original line was operated by the Missouri Pacific Railroad, with the first line from the Sarpy County line into Downtown Omaha.

== History ==
The line was first associated with the Union Pacific Railroad, whose officers first registered it as a "pet project" in 1883. In 1885, a young railroad tycoon named Jay Gould noticed that the Omaha Belt Line would be a perfect route to run his burgeoning Missouri Pacific Railroad around Omaha, thereby giving his railroad direct access to Downtown Omaha, something his railroad had previously only been able to reach via Union Pacific-owned tracks, which Missouri Pacific's line from Kansas City connected with at Portal, NE, just west of Papillion, NE.

While being constructed with Union Pacific employees and materials, the Belt Railway had only weak ties to UP on a business level, so, the always ambitious Gould decided he would expropriate Union Pacific of the 15-mile rail line around Omaha. To ensure local agreement, Gould, known for his charisma and strategic use of easily swayed government officials, stacked the Omaha Belt Board of directors with local officials whom Gould had frequent, personal contact with - except S.H.H. Clark, who was a former president of the Union Pacific - eager to work for Gould's growing empire. This acquisition of the Omaha Belt Railway from the Union Pacific was viewed as a masterfully enacted business coup in later years. The line was finished using materials from both railroads. That use of combined resources was the subject of a later dispute between the railroad companies which they carried to the US Railway Commission. The case was eventually dropped. By the 1920s, 178 trains per day went in and out of Omaha carrying mail, passengers, and freight.

The line was abandoned and removed piecemeal throughout the 1980s and 1990s as freight customers moved to bigger facilities away from the rail line and public transportation service in Omaha became less popular and dominated by an inefficient bus system. Today a portion of the Belt Line has been turned into the MoPac Trail (MoPac being the age-old nickname of the Missouri Pacific Railroad), also known as the "Field Club Trail", a recreational trail in Omaha. A small portion of the Belt Line Railway is still in use on the extreme south end of the line, which now serves as a "spur" (a dead end railroad track that provides access to one or more industries) to several South Omaha industries near Dahlman Avenue. It is operated by the Union Pacific Railroad.

== Lines and properties ==
Missouri Pacific's Omaha Belt Line included the main yard at Nicholas Street in North Omaha, the "Alley" switching district in Downtown Omaha, the "short belt" industrial area and the Westside Junction near 48th and Leavenworth streets. The Belt Line interchanged with several other roads including the Union Pacific, the Chicago and Northwestern Railway, the "Omaha Road" Railway and the Illinois Central. The Belt connected with the Missouri Pacific Railroad's original mainline at Westside Junction, as well as the newer mainline to Kansas City and St. Louis at Dahlman Ave. in South Omaha. The Missouri Pacific railroad also had branches in Lincoln, Wahoo and Nebraska City.

== See also ==
- History of Omaha
- Missouri Pacific Railroad
