= Boulevards in Omaha, Nebraska =

- Omaha Park and Boulevard System
- U.S. National Register of Historic Places
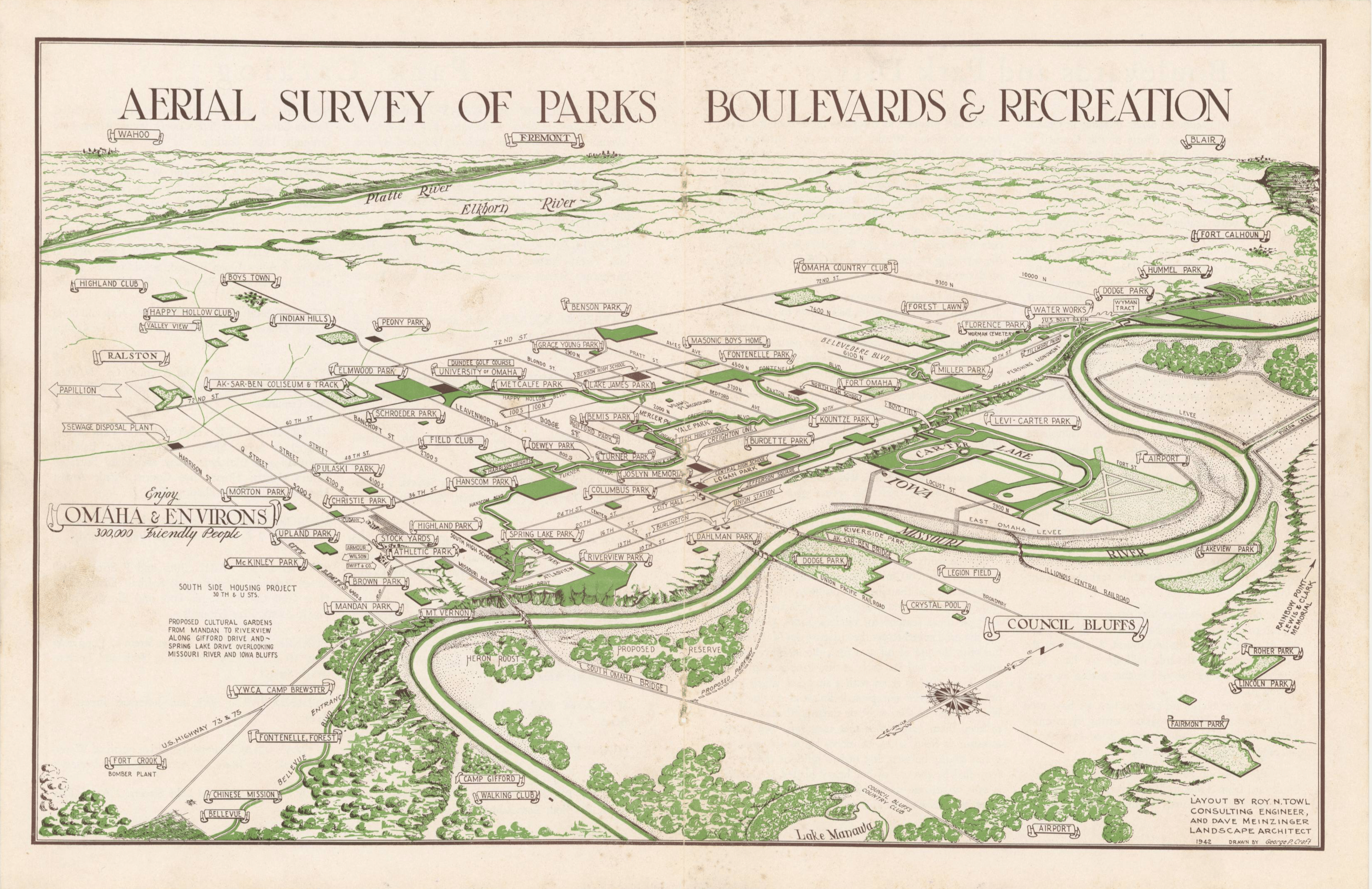
- Aerial survey of Parks, Boulevards, and Recreation for Omaha, NE in 1942
- Location: Omaha
- Coordinates: 41°14′32″N 95°57′29″W
- NRHP reference No.: 13000196
- Added to NRHP: April 23, 2013

Boulevards in Omaha are part of a park and boulevard system originally designed in 1889 by Horace Cleveland. There are more than one hundred miles (160 km) of boulevards throughout the city of Omaha, Nebraska today.

The park-and-boulevard system is listed in the National Register of Historic Places.

== History ==
In 1889 Horace W.S. Cleveland proposed that the city of Omaha develop a series of "broad ornamental avenues, known as boulevards or parkways" designed "with a tasteful arrangement of trees and shrubbery at the sides and in the center", similar to the comprehensive plans of European cities in the mid-19th century. His plan was accepted by the city's Parks Commission, resulting in the construction of Florence Boulevard, then called "Omaha's Prettiest Mile Boulevard", in 1892.

Omaha's early boulevard system was viewed as an extension of the parks system in the early park of the 20th century. Florence Boulevard was the first link; the second was Hanscom Boulevard, which was designed to connect the city's first two park, Hanscom Park, with its second, Riverview Park. Happy Hollow, Fontenelle and Turner Boulevards followed. The development of Lincoln Boulevard in Bemis Park was credited with the rapid growth of that subdivision in the early 20th century. A large segment of that boulevard was demolished during the construction of Interstate 480 in the early 1960s, and only a small segment remains.

The boulevard system originally weaved North Omaha, Midtown Omaha and South Omaha together, with sections traveling to Dundee, Gifford Park, Field Club and Benson. Plantings, tree-lined drives and smooth roadways throughout the city were treated with park-like value. A 1915 plan epitomized this ideal by calling for a riverfront boulevard that weaved the entire length of the Missouri River through Omaha. The northern section, called J.J. Pershing Drive, was finished by 1920; Gifford Drive in South Omaha was designed to do the same. However, influential Omaha architect John Latenser was adamant about preventing this project from coming to fruition in Downtown Omaha, where he saw the boulevard potentially impeding on his plans for the Port of Omaha. Because of his resistance this early "back to the river" plan did not succeed.

In the 1930s the city pushed to reconstruct its boulevard system, and received forty percent of the revenue from its wheel tax to do that. The Works Progress Administration assisted with construction, leading to the city adding more than 30 miles (48 km) onto the existing system of 65 miles (105 km) of roadway. In 1934 the WPA completed work on the Saddle Creek Underpass, which took what was then the westernmost addition to the system under Dodge Street. Today Saddle Creek Boulevard is called Saddle Creek Road.

The late 1940s construction of the Deer Park Boulevard leading to the new Johnny Rosenblatt stadium on that street is credited with giving John Rosenblatt the political ability to become the mayor of Omaha. Abbott Drive was built by Eppley Airfield during this period, too, becoming the easternmost link in Omaha's boulevard system.

== Present ==
The Sorensen Parkway is a modern version of the historic boulevard system that was built in the 1880s.

In the early first decade of the 21st century a plan was adopted by the city of Omaha to introduce more boulevards throughout the suburbs of Omaha. The Revised Suburban Parks Master Plan identifies two types of boulevard as the "Grand Boulevard", which is designed as Cleveland originally conceptualized it, and the "Parkway" style. The Grand Boulevard is characterized by wide lanes, planting medians in between roadways, and limited access through narrow driveways and side streets. The Parkway features a faster speed limit, broad, tree-lined roadways and limited residential access. Both have large trees with broad canopies. Lighting, roundabouts, signage and concrete types are all also considerations. The boulevard system is also included in the city of Omaha's Green Streets Master Plan.

Boulevards in Omaha alphabetical order
Name	Constructed	Notes
Abbott Drive		Connects NoDo with Eppley Airfield, runs north through East Omaha
Belvedere Boulevard		Runs east–west through the Belvedere neighborhood
Deer Park Boulevard		Runs east–west in Sheelytown from South 15th Street past Deer Hollow Park to South 24th Street
Florence Boulevard	1892	First in system; runs north from NoDo through several neighborhoods towards Florence
Fontenelle Boulevard		Named after Logan Fontenelle; runs north from Benson to Belvedre neighborhood.
Gifford Drive		Originally part of a 1915 "back-to-the-river" plan in which a boulevard would follow the entire length of the Missouri River from South Omaha through Downtown to North Omaha.
Hanscom Boulevard		Named after Andrew J. Hanscom; runs from Vinton Street north through Hanscom Park to the Ford Birthsite neighborhood
Happy Hollow Boulevard		Runs north from Elmwood Park past University of Nebraska at Omaha campus and Memorial Park, then veers east through Metcalfe Park to the Northwest Radial Highway in Benson
Hoctor Boulevard		Runs southeast to northwest starting in Deer Park; intersected by Interstate 80, ending at Deer Park Boulevard.
John A. Creighton Boulevard		Named after John A. Creighton; runs south–north from Mercer Park through the Pleasant Hill neighborhood north and east to Adams Park Paxton Boulevard at Sprague Street.
John J. Pershing Drive		Named after J.J. Pershing; runs south–north in East Omaha from Abbott Drive at North 16th Street past Florence under the Mormon Bridge past Dodge and Hummel parks, ending at Ponca Road. Originally part of a 1915 "back-to-the-river" plan in which a boulevard would follow the entire length of the Missouri River from North Omaha through Downtown to South Omaha.
Lafayette Ave		Runs east–west from North 36 Street to North 38 Street ending at entrance for Walnut Hill park.
Lincoln Boulevard		Runs through the Bemis Park neighborhood east–west from North 33 Street to Mercer Boulevard.
Minne Lusa Boulevard		Runs south–north through the Minne Lusa neighborhood from Redick Avenue along Miller Park to J.J. Pershing Drive.
Paxton Boulevard		Runs east–west through North Omaha from John A. Creighton Blvd at North 31st Avenue, connecting with Fontenelle Boulevard in Fontenelle Park.
Riverview Boulevard		Runs south–north from Grover Street, immediately east of Henry Doorly Zoo, to the Riverview Baseball Park on Bancroft Street.
Sorenson Parkway		Runs east–west through North Omaha from North 30 Street to Irvington Road at North 90 Street.
Spring Lake Drive		Runs south–north through the Spring Lake neighborhood from South 13 and "J" Streets through Spring Lake Park to Hoctor Blvd.
Turner Boulevard		Runs south–north from the Field Club neighborhood at Woolworth Avenue past Leavenworth Park meandering northeast at Dewey Park on South 33 Street to become Lincoln Boulevard at Dodge Street.
Twin Ridge Boulevard		Runs south–north from Woolworth Avenue heading southwest ending before Center Street between South 43rd Street and South 45th Street.

== See also ==
- List of streets in Omaha, Nebraska
- History of Omaha
