= List of streets in Omaha, Nebraska =

This is a list of streets in Omaha, Nebraska. Founded in 1854, today Omaha's population is over 490,000 making it the nation's 41st-most populous city in the United States. There are more than 1.2 million residents within a 50-mile (80-km) radius of the city's center, forming the Greater Omaha area. Streets are used primarily for automobile traffic, including public buses. An increasing number of bike lanes are being dedicated on streets throughout the city, as well.

== History ==
The original 1865 plat of the city contained 22 streets. In 1880, only a quarter mile of Omaha's estimated 118 miles (190 km) of streets were paved. In 1883, Andrew Rosewater (brother of newspaper owner Edward Rosewater) became city engineer and began an ambitious project to modernize city streets. By 1886, the city had 44 miles (71 km) of paved streets, including asphaltum, Colorado sandstone, Sioux Falls granite and wooden blocks.

In 1889, Horace W.S. Cleveland proposed that the city of Omaha develop a series of "broad ornamental avenues, known as boulevards or parkways" designed "with a tasteful arrangement of trees and shrubbery at the sides and in the center". This proposal was similar to the comprehensive plans of European cities in the mid-19th century. His plan was accepted by the city's Parks Commission, resulting in the construction of Omaha's Prettiest Mile Boulevard in 1892, and dozens of other boulevards to present day. Today, Fontenelle and Lincoln boulevards are among the many remnants of the early plan; Sorensen Parkway is a modern version of the historical plan. Saddle Creek Boulevard, currently known as Saddle Creek Road, which was originally the westernmost boulevard in the system.

== List ==
Main streets in Omaha alphabetical order
Name	Constructed	Notes
Ames Avenue		Starts at 72nd Street and goes east until it turns into Commercial Avenue.
Aksarben Drive		
Bennington Road		Goes east through Bennington, Nebraska and becomes NE-36 when it connects to Pawnee Road and goes east to 72nd Street, where it then turns south as McKinley Street.
Blondo Street		Starts as Blondo Parkway and goes east.
Blair High Road		Starts south of Blair, and splits into 204th Street, eventually going south and turns into Military Avenue.
Burt Street		
California Street		
Cass Street		West Dodge Road splits into Cass Street and the southeast bound West Dodge Road.
Center Street		Starts at 67th Street passing through Aksarben Village, then goes east towards Hanscom Park.
Commercial Avenue		Starts at Ames Avenue and goes south until it hits 16th Street.
Crown Point Avenue		Branches off of Blair High Road and goes east until it hits Hartman Avenue.
Cuming Street		NE-64 after the splitting of the NW Radial Highway.
Curtis Avenue		Starts at the intersection of 52nd Street and the Sorenson Parkway and goes west to 30th Street at Miller Park.
Dodge Street	From 1856 to present	Connects from the Missouri River to 240th Street, serving as the main north/south boundary in the city
Douglas Street		Dodge Street splits into two streets that are Route 6, Dodge and Douglas.
Dunlop Avenue		The main street of Omaha's Frenchtown.
Ed Creighton Avenue		Starts at 32nd Avenue and ends when it hits the Interstate 480.
F Street		
Farnam Street		Originally the main street of Omaha, it branches off of Dodge Street and goes east until it hits Eighth Street.
Florence Boulevard		A boulevard that starts at 20th Street and goes north to the southern part of the Florence Neighborhood until it hits John J Pershing Drive.
Fontenelle Boulevard		
Fort Street		Named for Fort Omaha, goes into Iowa and is a northern street.
Grover Street		
Harrison Street		Border street between Douglas and Sarpy Counties. The most southern main street in Omaha.
Harney Street		Named for William S. Harney.
Hartman Avenue		Starts at 72nd Street and connects to Crown Point Avenue, and goes east, ending at 42nd Street at Redman Circle.
Happy Hollow Boulevard		Boulevard that starts at the NW Radial Highway and turns south onto Underwood Avenue, then goes south to Dodge and Farnam Streets, eventually turning into 57th Street when it hits Leavenworth Street.
John A. Creighton Boulevard		
I Street		
Industrial Rd.		Route 275. Goes from West Center Rd. to L Street. Turns Route 275 from West Center Rd. to L Street.
L Street		Route 275 and NE-92.
Leavenworth St.		Starts at 60th Street and goes east until it stops at Sixth Street.
Lincoln Boulevard		
Lincoln Highway		Longest segment of the original Lincoln Highway.
Locust Street (Omaha)		Goes through Iowa as East Locust Street and loops around Eppley Airport as Lindbergh Plaza.
Maple Street		Route 64 until taken over by Military Avenue.
Martha Street		Starts at Tenth Street and goes west until hitting Interstate 480 and turns into Ed Creighton Avenue.
Martin Avenue		Starts in the Florence Neighborhood and does southwest, turning into North 36th Avenue when it hits Redick Avenue, and Fontenelle Boulevard when it hits Curtis Avenue.
McKinley Street		Named for President William McKinley, it is NE-36 and goes southeast from 72nd Street to 30th Avenue, turning into Dick Collins Road.
Missouri Avenue		Route 275 and NE-92. Splits from L Street at around 21st Street, and goes across the Missouri River as the South Omaha Bridge.
Navarro Avenue		Also known as the Navarro Freeway. Runs from South 204th Street to South 32nd Avenue.
Nicholas Street		
North 24th Street		
North 30th Street		
Pacific Street		Starts at Skyline Drive and goes east until it hits 60th Street.
Pawnee Road		NE-36, and goes east until it hit Bennington Road on a southbound course.
Q Street		One of the most southern streets in Omaha, eventually becoming West Q Rd.
Regency Parkway Drive		Starts at California Street and goes south until it hits Pacific Street, then becoming 103rd Street.
Saddle Creek Road		Starts at Hickory Street and runs north going, under Dodge Street in the Saddle Creek Underpass, then merges with the NW Radial Highway.
Saint Mary's Avenue		Starts at Howard Street and goes southwest until it hits Leavenworth Street.
Sorensen Parkway		90th Street turns east to create the Sorenson Parkway.
South 10th Street		
South 24th Street		
State Street		Northernmost Main Street in Omaha, going through northwest and Florence in Omaha.
Stony Brook Boulevard		Starts at 156th Street and goes through the Stonybrook Neighborhood until it turns into 142nd Street.
Underwood Avenue		Branches off of Cass Street and becomes the main street of Dundee until it turns into California Street.
Vinton Street		Starts at 11th Street and turns south.
West Center Road		Route 275 until it hits Industrial Rd.
West Dodge Road		
West Maple Road		
Western Avenue		
Woolworth Avenue		Starts at 48th Street and goes east to Columbus Park.
Wilson Avenue		Runs of 228th Street south of West Dodge Road.
Young Street		
72nd Street		Serves as the main east/west boundary in the city
84th Street		
90th Street		
120th Street		
132nd Street		
138th Street		
144th Street		Main Street of Millard.
150th Street		
156th Street		
168th Street		
180th Street		
192nd Street		
204th Street		Main Street of Elkhorn

== See also ==
- History of Omaha
