= Dundee City Hall (Omaha, Nebraska) =

Coordinates: 41.264815°N 95.989899°W

Dundee City Hall and Fire Station
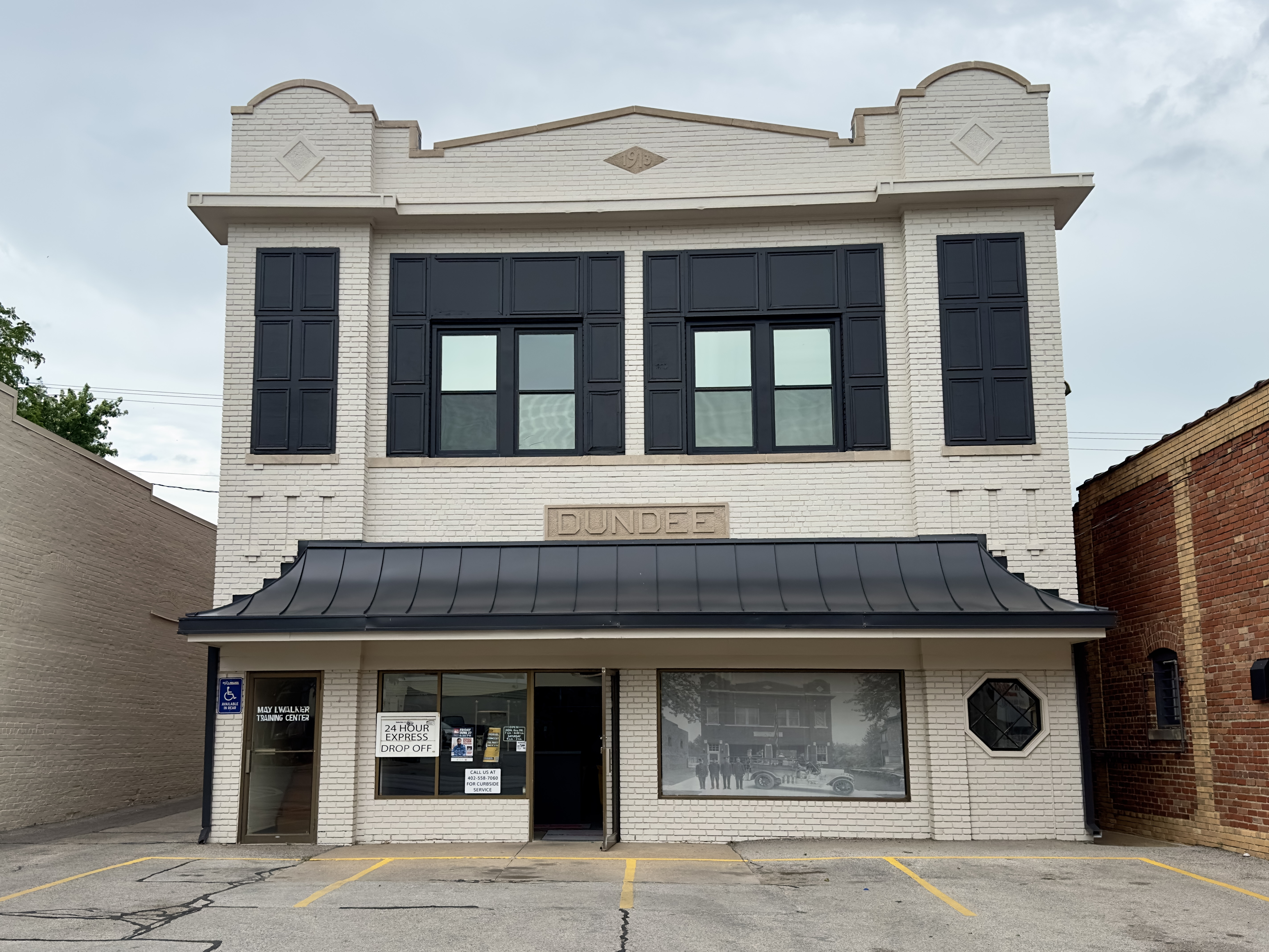
- Interactive map of the Dundee City Hall and Fire Station area

General information
- Location: Omaha, Nebraska, United States
- Construction started: 1914
- Completed: 1914

Design and construction
- Engineer: Peter Kiewit, Sr.

The Dundee City Hall and Fire Station was located at 4921 Underwood Avenue in the present-day Dundee neighborhood of Omaha, Nebraska.

== History ==
Dundee's downtown was located at 50th and Underwood by 1910. The combined Dundee City Hall and fire station was built in 1913, and was located along the streetcar line.

== See also ==
- History of Omaha, Nebraska
