= King Science and Technology Magnet Center =

Coordinates: 41°17′35″N 95°56′36″W

- 3720 Florence Blvd; Omaha, Nebraska; United States

Information
- Type: Public middle school
- School district: Omaha Public Schools
- Teaching staff: 41
- Grades: 5-8
- Enrollment: 667 (2022-2023)
- Student to teacher ratio: 16.27
- Colors: Orange and black
- Mascot: Wildcat
- Website: https://www.ops.org/kingscience

King Science and Technology Magnet Center is a magnet middle school in Omaha, Nebraska, United States.

The school was constructed in 1969 and opened in 1973 in predominantly black North Omaha as Martin Luther King Middle School. In 1976, the school, under Omaha Public Schools' Desegregation Plan, became a site of forced busing from non-local neighborhoods.

In 1988, the school moved to Florence Boulevard, to the site of the former Horace Mann Middle School, and was reconstituted as King Science Center. In 2003, technology was added as a magnet theme and the school gained its current name.
