= Community gardens in Nebraska =

There are numerous community gardens in the U.S. state of Nebraska. A community garden is a piece of land collectively farmed by several people and may be created by local residents purchasing or taking over a vacant plot, or by an institution such as a church donating land to the community. In Nebraska many of the community gardens are to be found in or near the principal cities of Omaha and Lincoln, although examples may also be found in smaller communities such as Grand Island.

== Omaha ==
=== Dundee Community Garden ===
Dundee Community Garden is in the Dundee neighborhood of Omaha. The garden site is located at 4902 Underwood. Dundee Community Garden is one of the most notable. Dundee Community Garden is a member of the American Community Gardening Association. The garden was founded on a vacant lot in 2009 by a group of local residents. In early 2013, Dundee Community Garden Inc., received non-profit status as a 501(c)(3) organization. After a fundraising campaign, which included support from the Sherwood Foundation and the Peter Kiewit Foundation, on 15 May 2013, DCG purchased the land from the previous owner.

=== The Big Garden ===
The Big Garden began in 2005. Initially funded by the USDA's Community Food Project, the Big Garden had a goal of creating 12 community gardens in three years. Five years later the Big Garden included 26 gardens in the metro-Omaha area and added a sister project, the Big Rural Garden, in Southeast Nebraska. Today, the Big Garden is a network of over 100 community gardens in metro-Omaha and rural and semi-rural communities in Nebraska, Kansas, and Iowa---and growing!

The second annual "Tour de Gardens" was held in Omaha in 2014 with approximately 100 bicycle riders visiting 8 gardens and a root facility.

=== Other ===
Community Gardens in Omaha
Name	Location
Benson Community Garden	1302 North 60th Street
The Big Garden	(multiple locations)
Big Muddy Urban Farm	33rd and California, 35th and Cass, 18th and Fowler, 48th and Sahler
City Sprouts	4002 Seward Street
Earth Shelter Community Garden	65th and Ames
Farnam Farm	49th Street and Farnam Street
Gifford Park Community Garden	3416 Cass Street
Hands to Harvest Community Garden	1113 South 31st Street
New Omaha Garden Park	495 S. 192nd, Elkhorn
Root Down Community Garden	32nd and Webster
Sherman Community Center Garden	5701 North 16th Street
Springbrook Community Garden	7322 North 76th Street

== Lincoln ==
Lincoln, Nebraska has 13 community gardens as of May 2014. All of these are full and the organizing institution, Community CROPS (Combining Resources, Opportunities, and People for Sustainability), which was founded in 2003 with one garden, is now looking for new sites around Lincoln. In addition to the community gardens, CROPS also runs a training farm, a community supported agriculture program, and a regular stand at a local farmers' market.

Community Gardens in Lincoln
Name	Location
46th Street	46th Street and Pioneers Boulevard
Antelope	Sumner Street and Normal Boulevard
Southern Heights	S 40th Street and Old Cheney Road
1st and L	1st and L Street
Northeast Church	Adams Street
Oak Lake Church	N 1st Street
Peter Pan Park	Peter Pan Park
Mustard Seed	N 70th Street
1st Presbyterian	S 18th Street
Southminster	Otoe Street
14th and Hudson	S 14th Street and Hudson Street

== Grand Island ==
A new community garden in Grand Island called the Cherry Street Community Garden was started in 2014, with 10 by 10 feet (3.0 m × 3.0 m) plots available for rent, supported by a city councilwoman and the adjacent Cherry Street Apartments complex.

== See also ==
- Community gardens in Omaha, Nebraska
