= North Omaha, Nebraska =

Neighborhood in Omaha, Nebraska, U.S.

Coordinates: 41°19′N 95°59′W

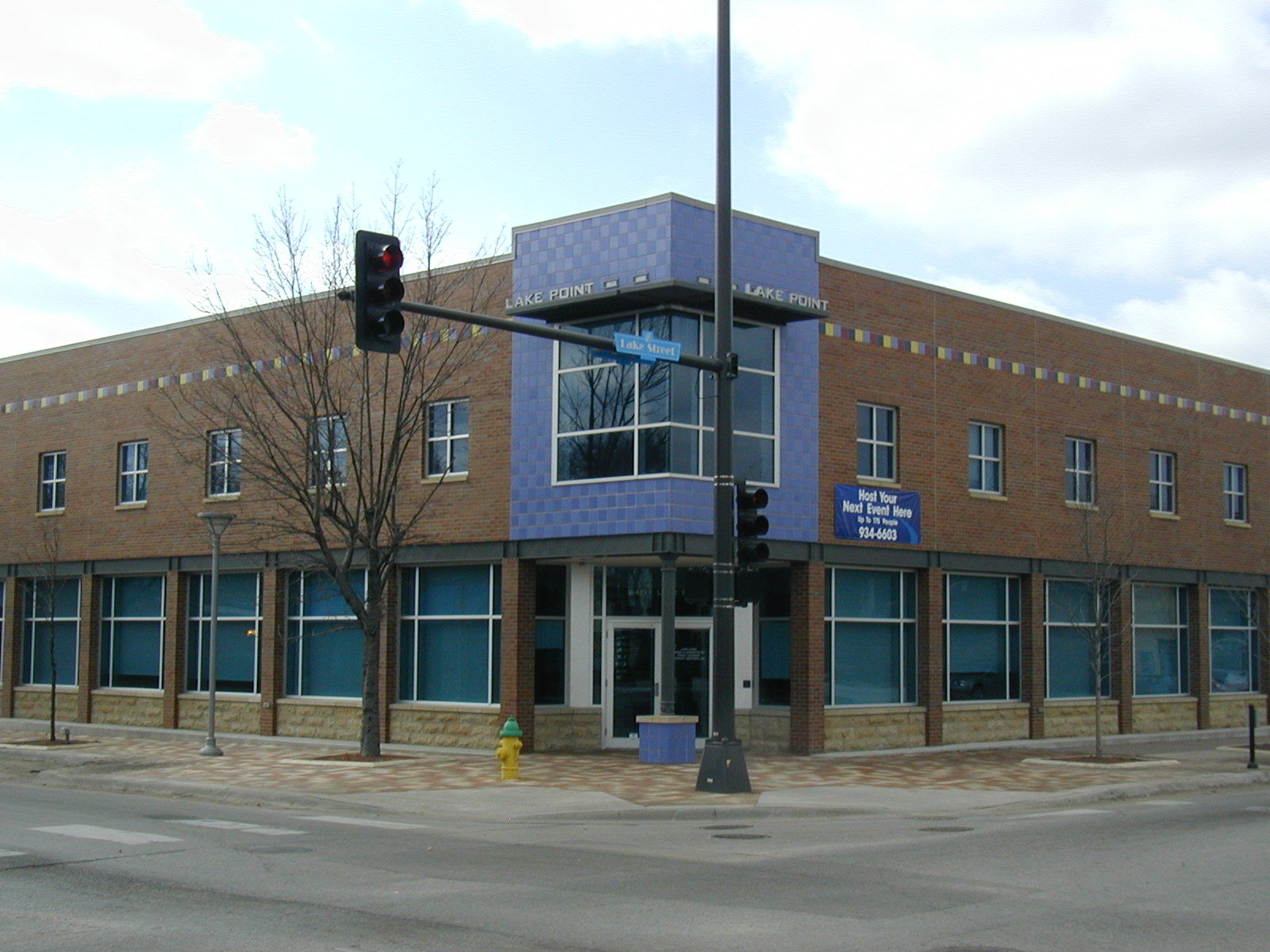
The southwest corner of 24th and Lake Streets in North Omaha

North Omaha is a community area in Omaha, Nebraska, in the United States. It is bordered by Cuming and Dodge Streets on the south, Interstate 680 on the north, North 72nd Street on the west and the Missouri River and Carter Lake, Iowa on the east, as defined by the University of Nebraska at Omaha and the Omaha Chamber of Commerce.

Located just north of Downtown Omaha, the community includes some of the oldest neighborhoods in the city, including the Near North Side, Bemis Park, Saratoga and Florence. It is the site of the Mormon Pioneers' Winter Quarters and the Mormon Temple, a center of European immigration as well as the historically significant African-American community, and the birthplace of Malcolm X. Important landmarks in the community include the Bank of Florence, Prospect Hill Cemetery and the Fort Omaha Historical District.

In 2006, North Omaha became the focus of national attention after local State Senator Ernie Chambers introduced an amendment to divide the Omaha school system into three, which some observers suggested would have created de facto segregated school systems based on residential patterns. The measure was eventually repealed.

== History ==
North Omaha has a recorded history extending to 1812 with the founding of Fort Lisa by Manuel Lisa. The area was home to Cabanne's Trading Post from the 1820s through the 40s, and in 1846 became home to two encampments that were some 3½ miles apart from one another: Cutler's Park and Winter Quarters. This whole area became part of what is now the city of Omaha, Nebraska.

When Omaha City was founded in 1854 the boundaries were around the present-day downtown core. Prospect Hill Cemetery, a North Omaha landmark, was founded on a high hill on the outskirts of Omaha in 1856, and with more than 15,000 burials it included many of the founding figures of Omaha, as well as soldiers from nearby Fort Omaha, immigrants, and many black people who worked throughout the city.

During the initial period of Omaha history there were a number of outlying towns surrounding it, many of which were located in present-day North Omaha, including Florence, East Omaha, and Saratoga, all of which were settled within a few years of Omaha. Scriptown was a land grab by early legislators of the Nebraska Territory who sought to award themselves for working for the new territory. Casey's Row was a small neighborhood of Black porters who worked for the local railroads. Squatter's Row was an area between North 11th and North 13th Streets, from Nicholas to Locust Streets, behind the Storz Brewery. For more than 75 years this area was inhabited solely by squatters. Before the city of Omaha extended north beyond Lake Street, mostly Irish settlers inhabited an area known as Gophertown, located north of Saratoga and south of Florence. The towns of Benson and Dundee, both in North Omaha, were suburbs of Omaha founded in the 1880s. Fort Omaha was a U.S. Army installation that was built starting in 1878, and was home to the Department of the Platte. Growth in North Omaha was spurred by the arrival of the Union Pacific Railroad and railyards to the east.

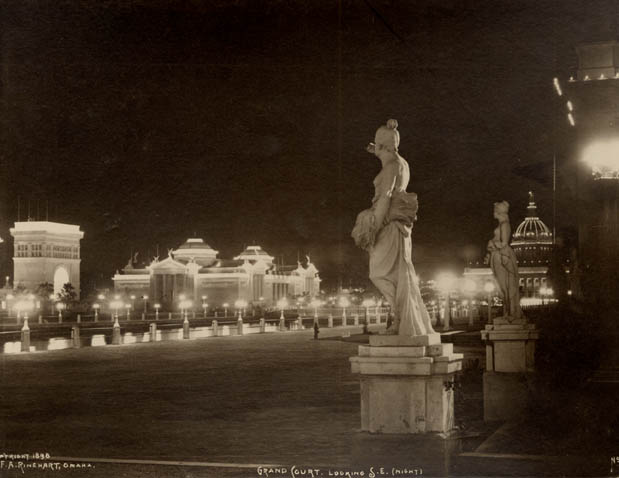
Night view of the Grand Court. Photograph by Frank Rinehart, 1898.

The grand Trans-Mississippi and International Exposition was a world's fair held in North Omaha from June through November 1898. It attracted more than 1,000,000 visitors to the area in and surrounding Kountze Park, which won the location over other areas, including the Miller Park neighborhood. The Expo featured many events in the community, including performances by Buffalo Bill's Wild West Show at the Omaha Driving Park, where it was founded several years prior. In 1909 Omaha University opened in the Redick Mansion in the Kountze Place neighborhood.

Perhaps the most important community, if not the most visible, in all of North Omaha was the Near North Side. This neighborhood was one of the first in Omaha, emerging in the 1860s as a home to the city's influx of German and Irish. In the later 19th century, they were joined by eastern European Jewish immigrants and African American migrants from the South. The bustling corridors of North 24th Street and North 16th Street were long the centers of important commercial and social activity.

From the 1920s through the 1950s North 24th Street was seen as a "Street of Dreams" where the city's African-American culture thrived. It was home to such important locations at the Dreamland Ballroom, and fostered a variety of social and political developments, including the founding of the Hamitic League of the World. Omaha had early chapters of the National Association for the Advancement of Colored People and the National Urban League. The early years of noted Harlem Renaissance writer Wallace Thurman were spent in the Near North Side, and Jewish feminist author Tillie Olsen grew up in the neighborhood. During this period Malcolm X was born in the neighborhood.

After restructuring of railroads and the meatpacking industries, massive job loss resulted in poverty and social unrest. In the 1960s and 70s three major riots tore apart the North 24th Street corridor. One broke out after the assassination of Martin Luther King Jr. in April 1968. With lower tax revenue because of job losses, the city had neglected many of the neighborhoods, leading to decreased police response times, decreased funding for education in the community, decreased support for youth and community programs, and other problems. A 1966 documentary film entitled A Time for Burning highlighted the racial tension which had been driving white flight from the community for the two previous decades. That film portrayed a young Ernie Chambers. A barber who later earned a law degree, in 1970 Chambers started his service as the longest serving State Senator in the history of Nebraska.

That year's Rice/Poindexter Case proved controversial as two leaders of Omaha's Black Panther Party were sentenced to life in prison for bombing a house in which a policeman was killed. Contention spread throughout the 1970s, when, according to one government agency, "Construction of the North Omaha Freeway, coupled with social unrest in the 1970s, greatly impacted the North Omaha area. One neighborhood experienced a 30 percent housing loss and major increase in crime." However, North Omaha has not seen another riot since 1970.

In the 1990s the Omaha Housing Authority demolished the Logan Fontenelle Housing Project in North Omaha. Built in the 1930s by the Works Progress Administration as improved housing for working families, by the late 20th century, the project was called "Little Vietnam" because of its association with gangs, violence and drug dealing.

=== Notable figures ===
North Omaha has been the birthplace and home of many figures of national and local import. They include Jewish-American author Tillie Olsen, who was a labor organizer in a packinghouse and wrote about women and the poor working class; Whitney Young, an important civil rights leader and later national director of the Urban League; the Nebraska State Senator Ernie Chambers; actor John Beasley; and actress Gabrielle Union. Malcolm X was born there in the early 1920s but his family moved away before he was a year old.

Singer Wynonie Harris, saxophonist Preston Love, and drummer Buddy Miles all called North Omaha home. Businesswoman Cathy Hughes is from North Omaha. The community was also the native home of several sports stars, including Baseball Hall of Famer Bob Gibson, football player Johnny Rodgers, Pro Football Hall of Famer, Chicago Bears Gale Sayers, Houston Texans starting running back Ahman Green, Former lightweight, Former unified Super lightweight and current WBO welterweight champion Terence Crawford and basketball player Bob Boozer.

=== Landmarks ===
Due to its diverse history, North Omaha is home to numerous historical and modern landmarks. There are many buildings listed on the Registered Historic Places and designated Omaha Landmarks within its boundaries. These include the 1856 Bank of Florence, which is the oldest standing building in Omaha; the 1892 Florence Boulevard, part of H.W.W. Cleveland's grand boulevard scheme for Omaha, and; the 1897 the Sherman, the oldest standing apartment building in Omaha.

African-American community leader Jack Broomfield commissioned noted African-American architect Clarence W. Wigington to design the Broomfield Rowhouse in 1913 after the Easter Sunday Tornado ravaged much of North Omaha. This building was listed on the National Register of Historic Places in 2007.

=== Neighborhoods ===
There are more than 50 defined historic neighborhoods in North Omaha today. The oldest neighborhoods in North Omaha were established between 1856 and 1900. They include Bemis Park, Gifford Park, Gold Coast, Kountze Place, Miller Park, Walnut Hill and Orchard Hill.

Some of the oldest neighborhoods in North Omaha today were originally hamlets, villages or towns of their own. They include Saratoga, established by real estate speculators and abandoned by 1857; Briggs, a whistle stop on the Omaha Road heading north to Blair, Nebraska; Florence, once a contender for the Nebraska Territorial capital; and others.

There are several North Omaha neighborhoods listed on the National Register of Historic Places as historic districts including the 24th and Lake Historic District, Benson Downtown Historic District, Country Club Historic District, Dundee–Happy Hollow Historic District, Florence Main Street Historic District, Fairacres Historic District, Fort Omaha Historic District, Minne Lusa Residential Historic District, and the Nicholas Street Historic District.

=== Architecture ===
Houses built in Queen Anne, Arts and Crafts, Romanesque Revival and Classical Revival styles in the late 19th century and early 20th century occupy several neighborhoods throughout Omaha. Greek Revival commercial buildings and a Spanish Renaissance Revival church represent the reverence many architects held for history. Buildings in the 20th century Prairie School and work by Thomas Rogers Kimball represented a more modern perspective. The area is also home to many modern developments.

== Race relations ==
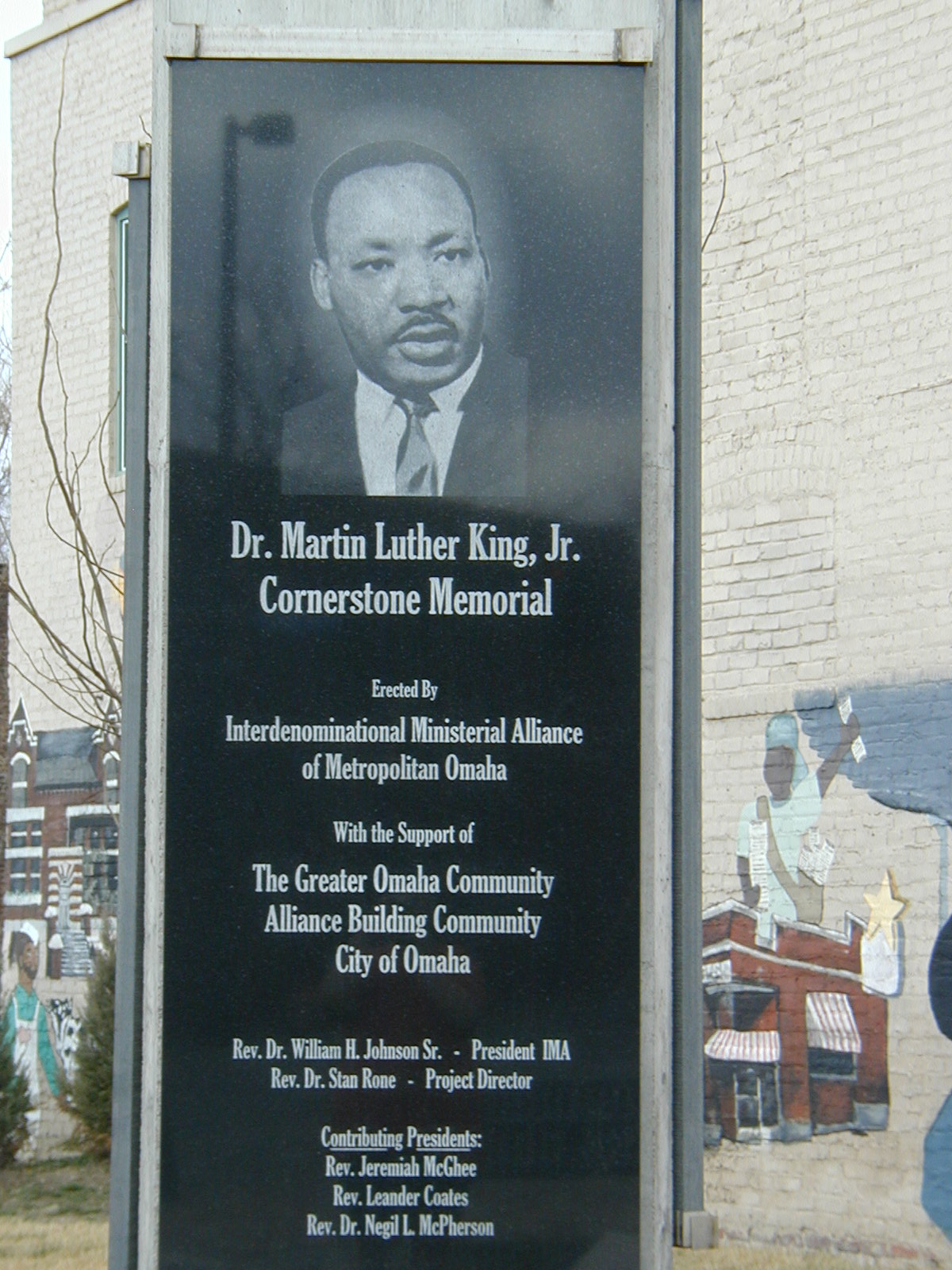
Dr. Martin Luther King Jr. Cornerstone Memorial at the NW corner of 24th and Lake St in North Omaha

Because of its troubles, many residents of Omaha view the North Omaha community as violent, poor, and drug-riddled. A recent local news report stated the area was "71 percent Black". Despite positive activities directed at improving North Omaha over the years, including those listed above, local media tend to focus on dramatic stories of racial and economic strife within the community.

Controversy arose from a 2006 spoof aired by a local radio station in which a popular area radio DJ parodied a recent North Omaha tourism promotion campaign, reportedly saying on air, "Discover miles of mayhem, discover drive-bys, discover gang violence, discover North Omaha." The City Council fought against this portrayal, with North Omaha city councilman Frank Brown demanding an apology from the radio station because "the spoof paints all residents of north Omaha as criminals."

=== Historic racial tension ===
There have been a number of distinct events throughout the history of North Omaha that were caused by racial tension between African Americans and Caucasians throughout the city. Omaha had events in common with other high-growth, major industrial cities that attracted many new immigrants and migrants, including lynchings and a race riot in 1919, a period known as Red Summer because of riots of whites against blacks in numerous cities across the country, due to social tensions after World War I, including competition for jobs and housing. These took place most often between ethnic whites and blacks. Community members have been activists for civil rights from the 1920s through the 1970s; during the 1960s and 1970s, mass protests and grassroots activism became typical. Several bloody and destructive riots within the community took place in the late 1960s.

In the 20th century, some of this tension has been expressed in city policies and relations with the police force. In June 1968, the shooting of a black 14-yr. old teenager named Vivian Strong by a white Omaha police officer in the Logan Fontenelle Projects marked the first of a number of incidents between individual members of the African-American community in North Omaha and the Omaha Police Department. Since the late 1980s, there have been a number of gang-related clashes, as well.

=== Historic civil rights movement ===
The early phase of the civil rights movement in North Omaha goes back to at least 1912, when residents founded a local chapter of the newly established National Association for the Advancement of Colored People (NAACP). In 1928 the first Urban League chapter in the western United States was started in North Omaha. Both of these organizations continue today.

Some industrial unions in Omaha became forces of change, after having excluded blacks in a discriminatory way. Many blacks had worked at the stockyards and other industries in South Omaha. In the 1940s student and youth activism in North Omaha led to the creation of two unique groups: Creighton University's DePorres Club, started in 1947, and the Black Association for Nationalism Through Unity (BANTU), popular through the 1960s. In the summer of 1963, the Citizens Civic Committee for Civil Liberties rallied to demand change and equal rights for all African Americans in Omaha.

While the Omaha civil rights movement did not reach its stated goals of gaining a state law ensuring equal housing opportunities or a separate state law ensuring equal job opportunities, it was successful for raising awareness of the inequities facing African Americans in Omaha. From the film A Time for Burning to Senator Ernie Chambers' recent legislative action, the civil rights movement has had a significant legacy in Omaha. For instance, hiring practices were changed within the police department and city government, where African Americans have gained positions.

== Community development ==
North Omaha has a range of important community-based organizations and government programs conducting community development, educational assistance and low-income housing. Additionally, a series of private and public ventures are developing local businesses in the community.

=== Housing ===
Path Concept Homes is a project that concentrates on urban development in the residential area between 25th and Parker; it is funded by the U.S. Department of Housing and Urban Development. The PCH plan will serve as a template for other development projects to follow, providing homes which are good for the consumer-friendly and the environmentally conscious. These homes are required to be sold to low-income and minority families. Other organizations providing housing in North Omaha include Holy Name Housing Corporation, Family Housing Advisory Services, Inc. and Rebuilding Together Omaha.

=== Children and youth ===
A number of youth organizations and programs serve North Omaha children and youth. They include the North Omaha B.E.A.R.S. Youth and Sports club. BEARS is an acronym which stands for Building Esteem and Responsibility Systematically and the program combines sports with academics and social enhancement. The Hope Center and Hope Skate are programs aimed at meeting the recreational and social needs of the community's young people. The Safe Haven Community Center is a youth center located at 2895 Binney Street. The North Omaha Boys & Girls Club Jaguars Football Team, North Omaha Christ Child Center, YEP! (Youth Empowerment Program) and Girls Inc. serve the area as well. The NorthStar Foundation directs its efforts toward young men with the goal of increasing the high school graduation rate.

=== Health programs ===
North Omaha is home to several medical institutions. They include Creighton University Medical Center - Bergan Mercy, the University of Nebraska Medical Center, and Immanuel Medical Center. Charles Drew Health Center also provides a variety of social services to low-income community members, as do many community development programs, such as the historic Urban League of Nebraska; Heartland Family Services-FAST; New Community Development; and the Benson-Ames Alliance Community Plan, which is community-driven planning process for neighborhood revitalization.

North Omaha was affected by pollution and harmful emissions from the American Smelting and Refining Company (which later changed its name to official name to its acronym, Asarco). The windfall from their downtown Omaha plant led to more than 8,000 acres (3,237 ha) in North Omaha being placed on the Superfund National Priorities List by the Environmental Protection Agency. As of 2003, 290 acres (117 ha) were cleaned.

Today North Omaha is the focus of the Lead-Safe Omaha Coalition. As is usual in older homes, there are sources of lead in older paints and other products which have been found to be harmful. The Coalition offers lead screenings and workshops on hazards of lead poisoning, safe home evaluations, lead-safe practices workshops, environmental certification training, HEPA vacuum rental, and the Information Resource Center on Lead to residents through North Omaha.

=== Economic development ===
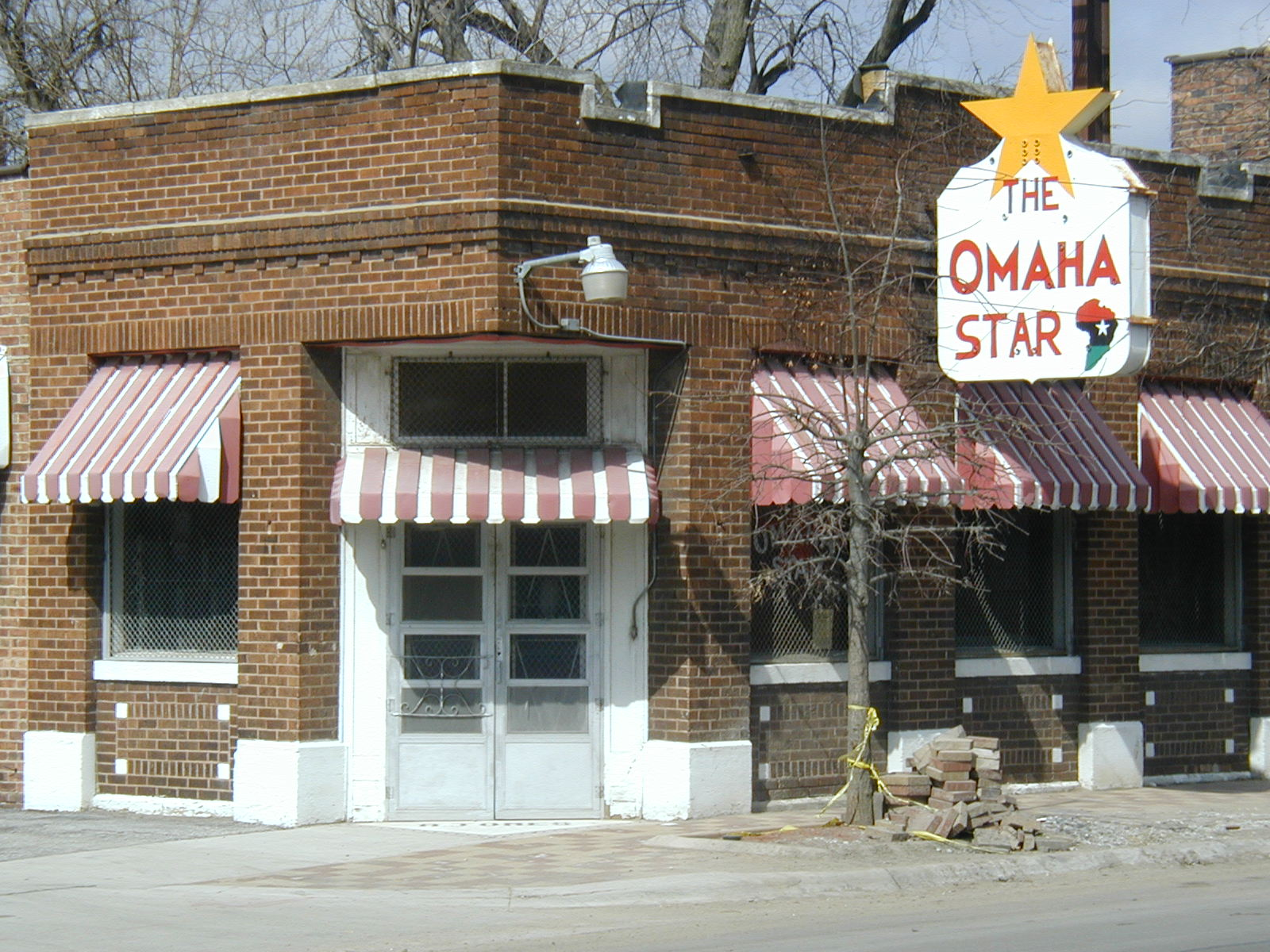
The historic office of the Omaha Star

Past industries have included housing component manufacturers, household products manufacturers, railroad industry companies, food manufacturers, and vehicle makers. Companies in these sectors included the Carter White Lead Company, Tip Top Products Company, Tidy House Company, Union Pacific, Missouri Pacific Railroad, Storz Brewery, Uncle Sam Breakfast Cereal, Stroud Company, Douglas Motors Corporation, Overland Tire Rubber Company, and several others.

The North Omaha Development Project is a project of the Greater Omaha Chamber of Commerce designed to "bring... business and community leaders together to find ways to positively impact the economic growth of the North Omaha community." It seeks to leverage city, federal and private sector funding to support public infrastructure and economic development. The North Omaha Business Park is located at 24th and Clark Streets the business park is "a joint effort of the Omaha Chamber and the City of Omaha... [It is] a 15 acre development on the former Logan Fontenelle Housing Projects site." It is home to several businesses, including Wes & Willy's, Cintas Corporation, Jobosh, Inc., and Armored Knights Company.

Longtime employers in the community include Lozier Corporation, a manufacturer of store fixtures with a large factory on Pershing Drive, and the Omaha Star, which has long been a source of employment and positive news for citizens in North Omaha.

== Culture ==
North Omaha is home to a wide variety of cultural institutions, events and activities that anchor the community. In the 20th century, North Omaha was home to several important cultural venues. They included the Druid Hall on Ames Avenue, where Maceo Pinkard performed frequently, and the Dreamland Ballroom was a historic venue that featured a wide range of national jazz talent, as well as local legends including saxophonist Preston Love. He said, "North Omaha used to be a hub for black jazz musicians, 'the triple-A league' where national bands would go to find a player to fill out their ensemble."

Early North Omaha jazz bands included Dan Desdunes Band, Simon Harrold's Melody Boys, the Sam Turner Orchestra, the Ted Adams Orchestra, and the Omaha Night Owls, as well as Red Perkins and His Original Dixie Ramblers. In 1931 Lloyd Hunter's Serenaders became the first Omaha band to record their music. A Lloyd Hunter concert poster can be seen on display at the Community Center in nearby Mineola, Iowa. Nat Towles was a renowned territory band leader based in Omaha. One of Omaha's most notable musicians of the 1940s was Anna Mae Winburn. As the leader of North Omaha's Cotton Club Boys, which included guitarist Charlie Christian, Winburn traveled the local region as a typical territorial band. Upon the advice of Jimmie Jewell, owner of the Jewel Building, Winburn left Omaha and hit the "big time" with the International Sweethearts of Rhythm.

North Omaha's musical culture also gave rise to several nationally and internationally reputable African-American musicians. Influential drummer Buddy Miles was friends with Love while they grew up and played together. They collaborated throughout their lives, and while they were playing with the greatest names in Rock and Roll, Jazz, R&B and Fund. Funk band leader Lester Abrams is also from North Omaha. Omaha-born Wynonie Harris, one of the founders of rock and roll, got his start at the North Omaha clubs and for a time lived in the now-demolished Logan Fontenelle Housing Project. Another notable local musician was Lomie Washburn. Born in North Omaha, she went on to write songs and sing backup with such legends as Chaka Khan, Rufus, Stevie Wonder and Aretha Franklin. She and many of the musicians from North Omaha have been inducted in the Omaha Black Music Hall of Fame.

North Omaha is home to several important annual events that help define and celebrate the community, its history, and its future. Native Omaha Days is a biennial North Omaha cultural tradition, reuniting members of the city's African-American community. The Days are commemorated with a variety of events, including the Evergreen Reunion, named after a town in Alabama from where many families' ancestors migrated. Other annual activities include the Juneteenth Parade, to mark Emancipation; the Fort Omaha Intertribal Powwow; the Omaha Blues, Jazz & Gospel Festival, Florence Days, and the Omaha North High School Homecoming, which includes a parade for the community. The Stone Soul Picnic is also an important annual event in the community.

== Religion ==
With its long history of migration from other regions and immigration from other countries, North Omaha has developed a rich religious tapestry representing the range of faith in Nebraska today. The diversity includes its Mormon roots in Florence, as well as the historic locations of Jewish synagogues established by European immigrants in the Near North Side. Several African-American congregations are located in the area, including the historic St. John's African Methodist Episcopal Church, St.Benedict the Moor Catholic Church, and Salem Baptist Church.

Historic Christian denominations once or currently represented in the community include Methodists, Baptists, Roman Catholics, Presbyterians, Lutherans, Church of God in Christ, and Lutherans, as well as non-denominational congregations and others. There is also an Anglican church in North Omaha, as well as Mennonite, Church of Latter-Day Saints, Seventh-Day Adventists, and others. Historic former religious institutions located in North Omaha include a Catholic St. Clare's Monastery, the Omaha Presbyterian Theological Seminary, schools, hospitals and others.

Today, the Episcopal Church of the Resurrection on 30th Street by Miller Park is an integrated Episcopal parish. Hope Lutheran Church is Nebraska's only African American Lutheran congregation. The Holy Family Catholic Church is the oldest surviving Catholic church in Omaha. St. Cecilia Cathedral, designed by Thomas Rogers Kimball, took more than fifty years to build. Evidence of the community's Jewish history can also been seen at the Pleasant Hill Cemetery or the Golden Hill Cemetery, while Christian burials have long been held at Prospect Hill Cemetery, Forest Lawn Memorial Park and the historic poor cemetery called Potter's Field.

== Education ==
Education has been a key to the community for several generations. The first public school in Omaha was opened in Jefferson Square Park at the heart of the Near North Side neighborhood when it opened in 1867. According to a local historian, the community has been home to more than 100 schools throughout its history.

Some of the former public schools in Omaha include Webster Grade School, Pershing Grade School, Beechwood Grade School, Lake Grade School, Long Grade School, Nathan Hale Junior High, and Tech High, once the largest technical education high school in the Western United States. Each of these buildings and many others are closed, and some have been repurposed while others have been demolished.

The North Omaha community has played host to several institutions of higher education. After an early proposal to establish the first University of Nebraska in 1863 in the Saratoga neighborhood, in 1909 Omaha University was founded nearby along North 24th Street, and their football team once played on the field at Saratoga School. Several other higher education institutions were started in North Omaha too, including the Omaha Presbyterian Theological Seminary, once located in the heart of the Kountze Place neighborhood. It closed permanently in 1947. Grace University, which closed in 2018, was opened in North Omaha for a school year in 1947–48. From 1908 to 1968, Duchesne College was located there. Several nursing schools were located in North Omaha as well, including the Immanuel Deaconess Institute School of Nursing that operated from 1891 to 1974, and the Evangelical Covenant Hospital nursing school graduated nurses from 1906 to 1937.

Today, education institutions remaining in North Omaha include Creighton University and the Metropolitan Community College (Omaha) located at Fort Omaha. The community continues to be served by Omaha Public Schools, including the local feeder high school, Omaha North High School as well as Benson High.

=== Libraries ===
The Omaha Public Library has several branches located in North Omaha. The Charles B. Washington Branch is located at 2868 Ames Avenue. The Benson Branch is located at 6015 Binney Street, and Florence Branch is at 2920 Bondesson Street.

There are also libraries at Creighton University and Metro Community College at Fort Omaha.

== Transportation ==
North Omaha has several main arterials. The major routes running north and south are Abbott Drive, North 16th Street (also called Sherman Avenue), North 24th Street (locally called "The Deuce"), North 30th Street, North 42nd Street, North 52nd Street, North 60th Street and North 72nd Street. Fontenelle Boulevard, Northwest Radial Highway, Military Road, Happy Hollow Boulevard, Country Club Avenue, John A. Creighton Boulevard and Saddle Creek Road each run north, south, east and west. Other important streets in the area include Burt and then Cuming Streets, which are the same street, and eventually earn the designation as Nebraska Highway 64 from North 27th Street west. Hamilton Street, Bedford Avenue, Sprague Street, Ames Avenue, Sorenson Parkway, Fort Street, Martin Avenue, Forest Lawn Avenue and McKinley Street are all important, as well. Lake Street eventually becomes Maple Street, which also spurs off as Military Avenue, all in North Omaha.

Several streets in the area are named after locally, regionally, and nationally important individuals. One of the main thoroughfares is North 24th Street, which from Cuming Street on the south to Reed Street on the north, is commonly thought to represent North Omaha's greatest historical legacy and hope for the future. North 24th was addressed as Omaha's "Street of Dreams" because of the prosperity and hope it embodied for its early African American, Eastern European and Jewish residents.

Florence Boulevard, Lincoln Boulevard and Fontenelle Boulevard are three components of Omaha's boulevard system that are located in North Omaha.

Several North Omaha traffic ways are named after military interests. They include Military Road, which is a historic road first laid out in 1854 by the US Army. It starts in North Omaha just off Hamilton at North 45th Street, where it is signed as Military Avenue. General John J. Pershing Drive was named after the successful World War I U.S. Army leader, and flows from East Omaha north by Florence, by the historic site of Fort Lisa and towards Blair. Similarly, Sherman Avenue, also known as North 16th Street, was named after William Tecumseh Sherman, the commander general of the U.S. Army in charge of the Indian Wars. Fort Street between North 30th and North 24th is named for Fort Omaha.

Sorensen Parkway, a modern contribution to the historic park boulevard system, was named after an Omaha mayor. It was built along an abandoned railroad bed and runs from North 72nd Street to North 30th Street, which is the historic Main Street of Florence. Sorensen is an example of a street in North Omaha which has been renamed; prior to 1996 Sorensen Parkway west of Northampton Boulevard was called Redick Avenue until 72nd Street. That year the city changed the name, and currently Sorensen Parkway travels beyond 72nd Street, continuing to the intersection of Blair High Road and North 90th Street, which is the start of Nebraska Highway 133. John A. Creighton Boulevard was named after the brother of Edward Creighton.

U.S. Highway 75 is a historic highway flowing along North 30th Street to become the North Expressway. This stretch of the highway was the source of much contention in when it was constructed in the 1970s and 80s. As a Nebraska state agency reports, "Construction of the North Omaha Freeway, coupled with social unrest in the 1970s, greatly impacted the North Omaha area. One neighborhood experienced a 30 percent housing loss and major increase in crime." Interstate 680 is the north bypass freeway that is a boundary for North Omaha. The Mormon Bridge is located on this stretch.

Other important streets in the area include Lake Street, Ames Avenue, Cuming Street, State Street, Abbott Drive and North 20th Avenue.

== Geography ==
The historic founding, development and current identification of North Omaha is bound to its geography. Located west of the Missouri River and next to Carter Lake, North Omaha includes several streams, small lakes, cliffs, and artesian springs. One historic report identifies a sulphur spring at the "foot of Spencer Street", with another at the "foot of Grand Avenue". The foot is presumed to be where 16th Street meets Commercial Avenue.

== Neighborhoods ==
In addition to its many historic neighborhoods, North Omaha has a number of substantial neighborhoods. In successive generations the area has been home to Irish, German, Jewish, Lithuanian and other European immigrants, as well as African-American migrants from across the Southeast. Their community in North Omaha has lasted more than 100 years.

== Demographics ==
Statistics gathered from the 2000 United States census for the North Omaha area show that by percentages, North Omaha has a population of 43,621 and is 59% African-American, 29% White, 5% Hispanic and 7% other.

Race	68102	68110	68111
White	3,477	3,432	6,457
Black	1,230	5,314	19,108
Hispanic	465	401	1,056
Asian	287	43	129
Other	435	551	1,236
Total	5,894	9,741	27,986

In 2003, the African-American population in Omaha was estimated at 52,273 or 13.1 percent of the city's total estimated population of 397,713. African Americans are the largest minority group in Omaha, according to the U.S. Census Bureau.

== See also ==
- List of people from North Omaha, Nebraska
- List of landmarks in North Omaha, Nebraska

== Gallery ==
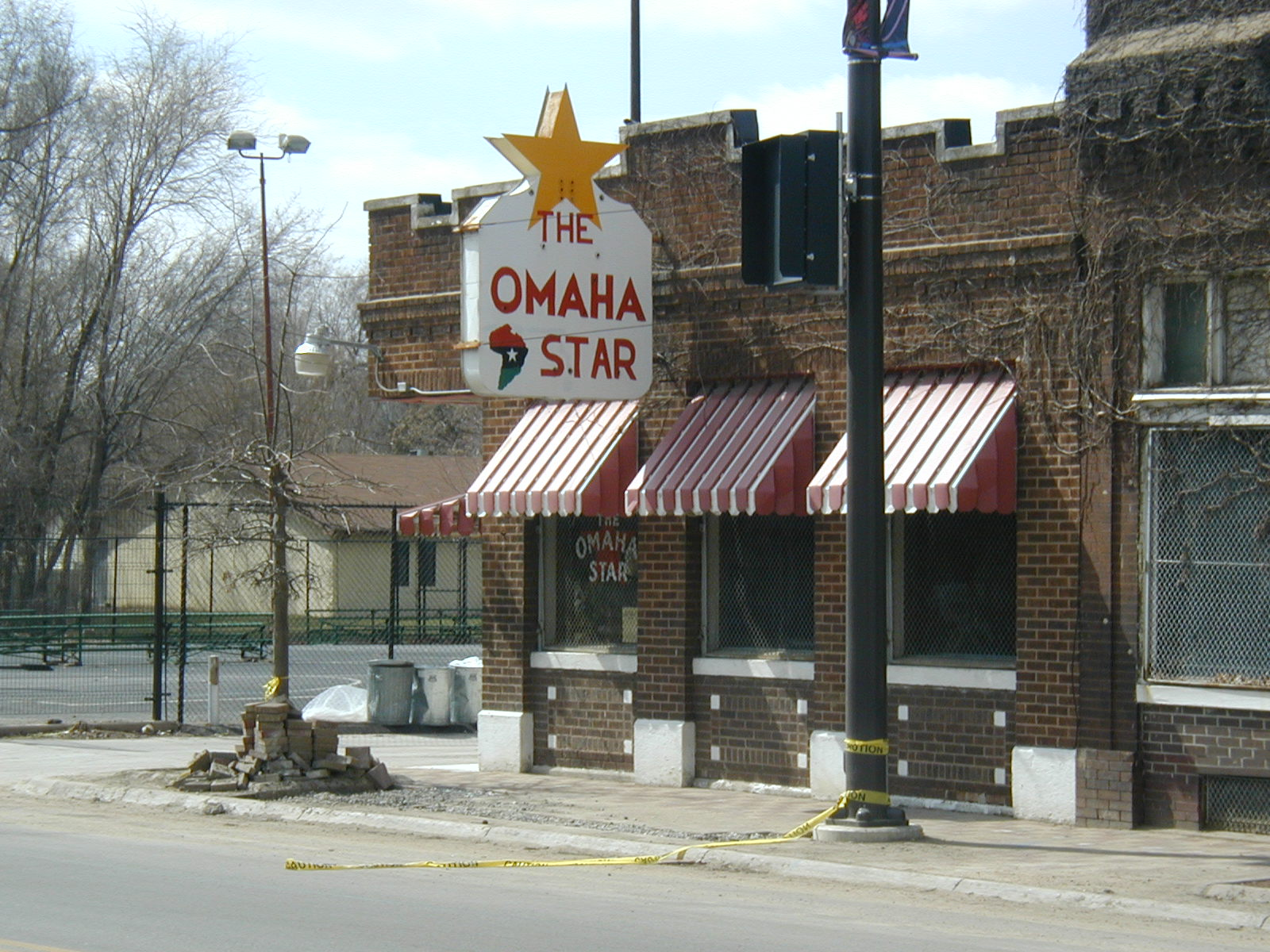
Omaha Star office at NE corner of 24th & Grant Streets

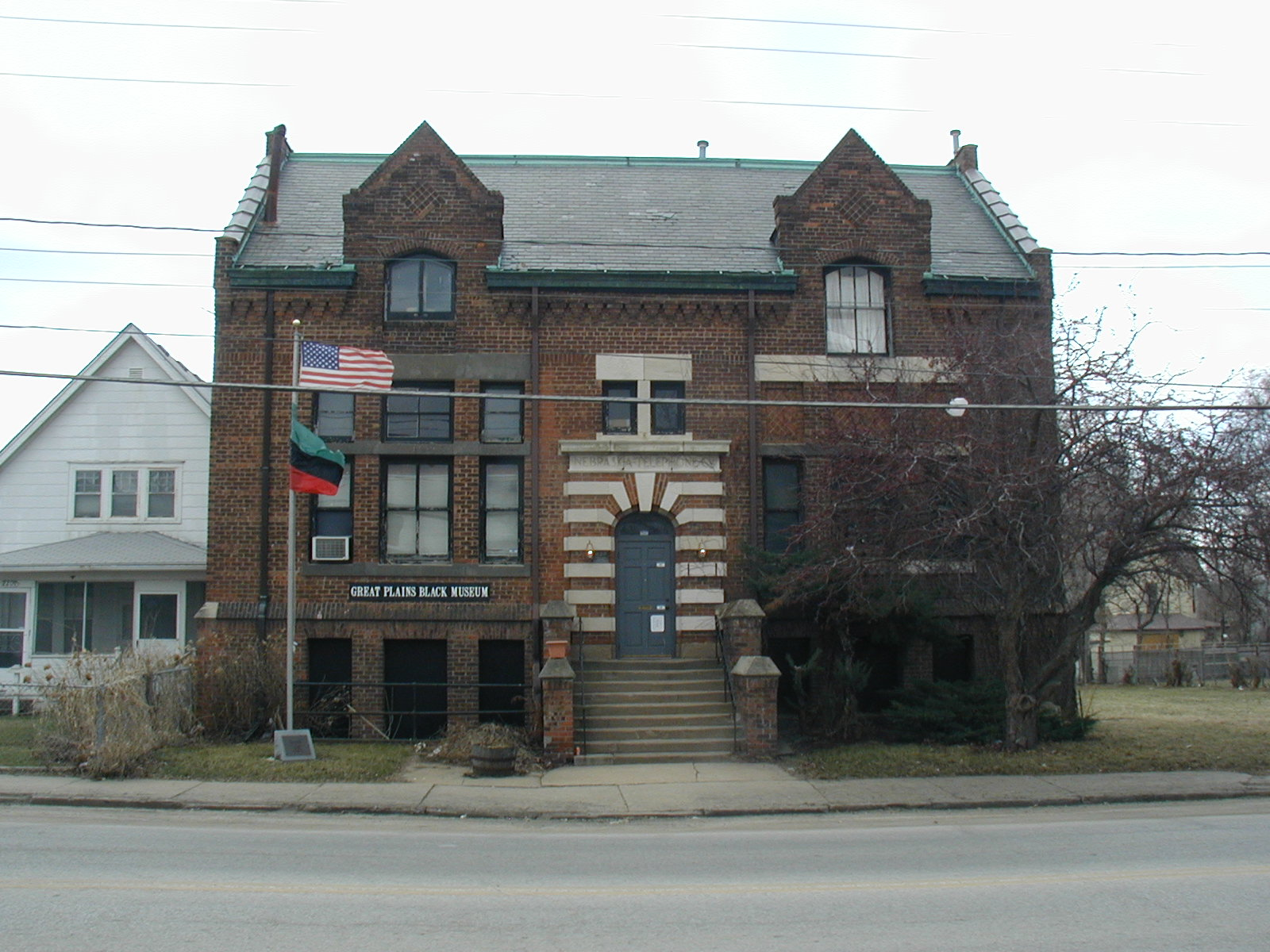
Webster Telephone Exchange Building, also used for the 20th-century Great Plains Black Museum

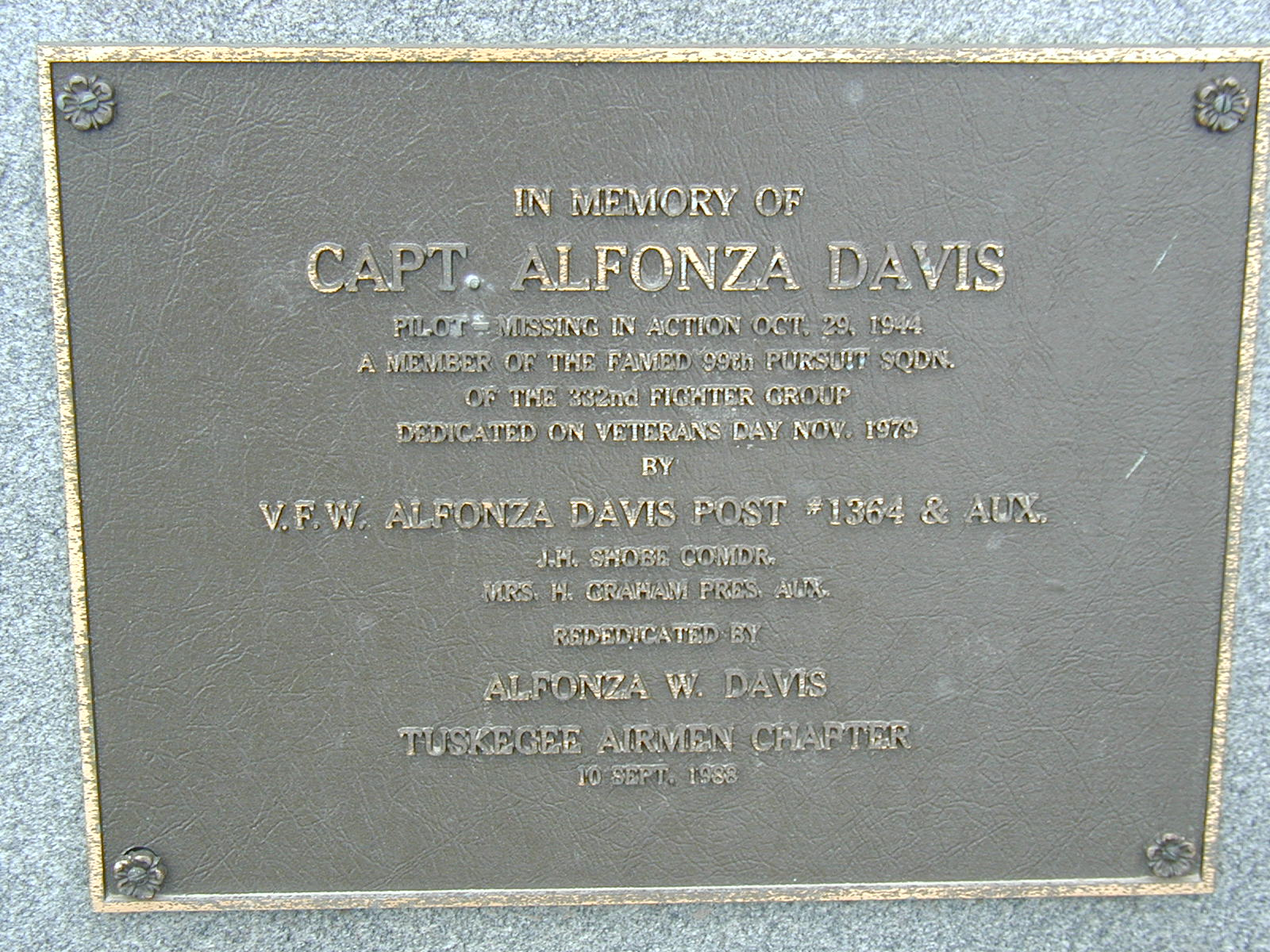
Captain Alfonza Davis commemorative plaque; Tuskegee Airman from N.O.

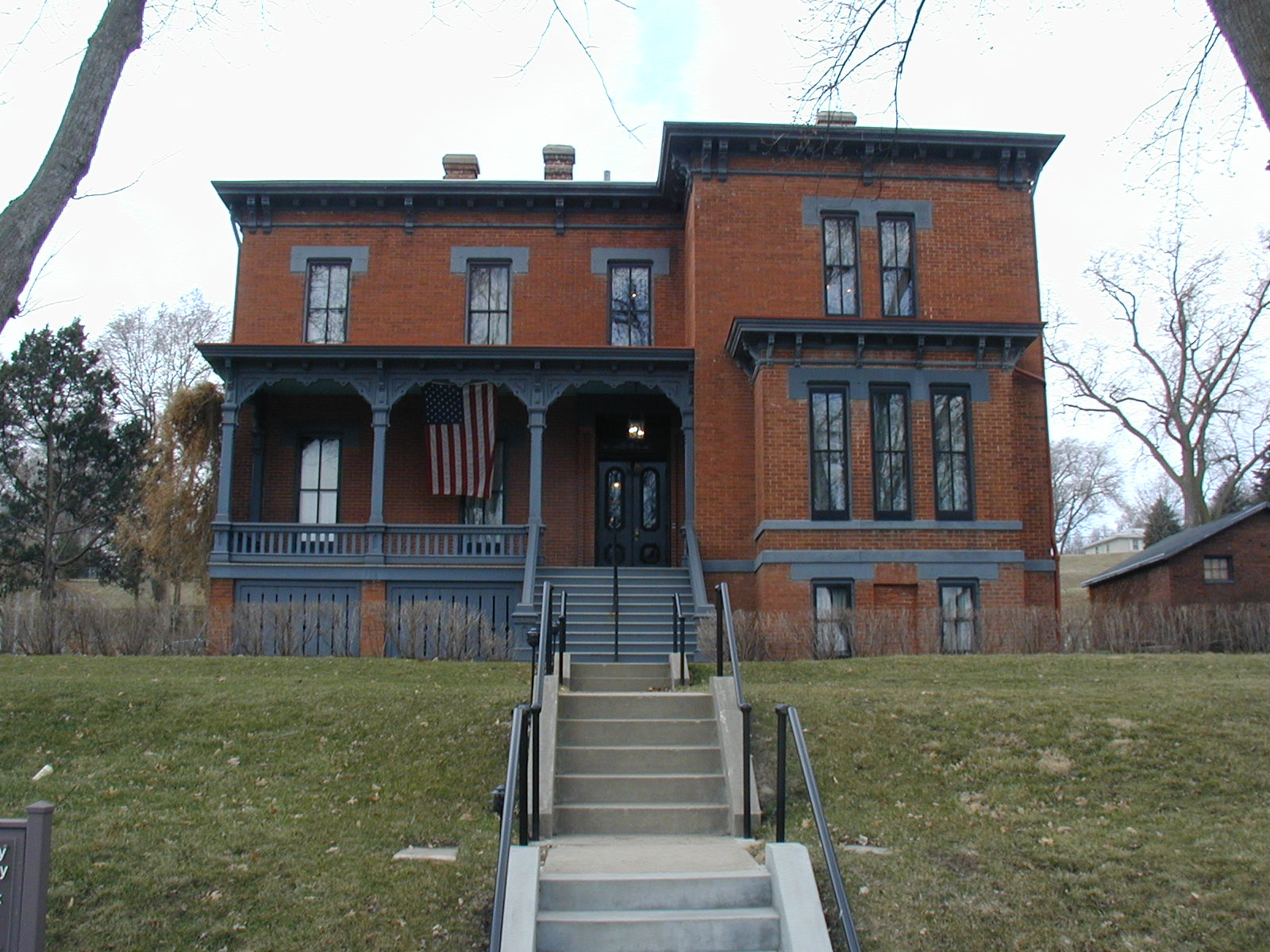
General Crook House at Fort Omaha

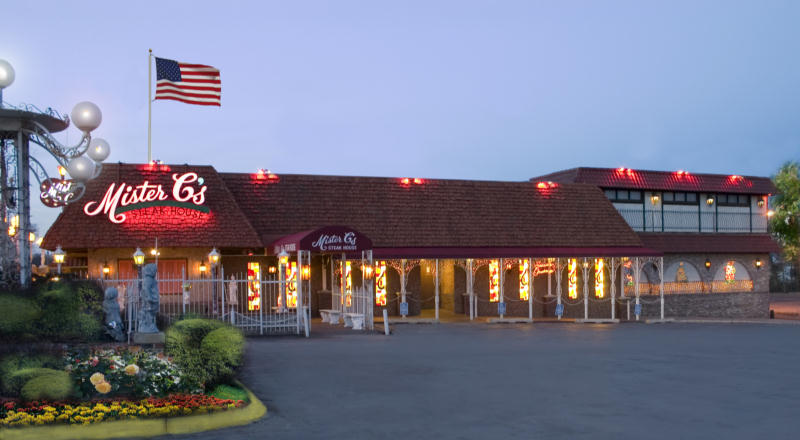
Now-closed Mister C's, a local landmark restaurant

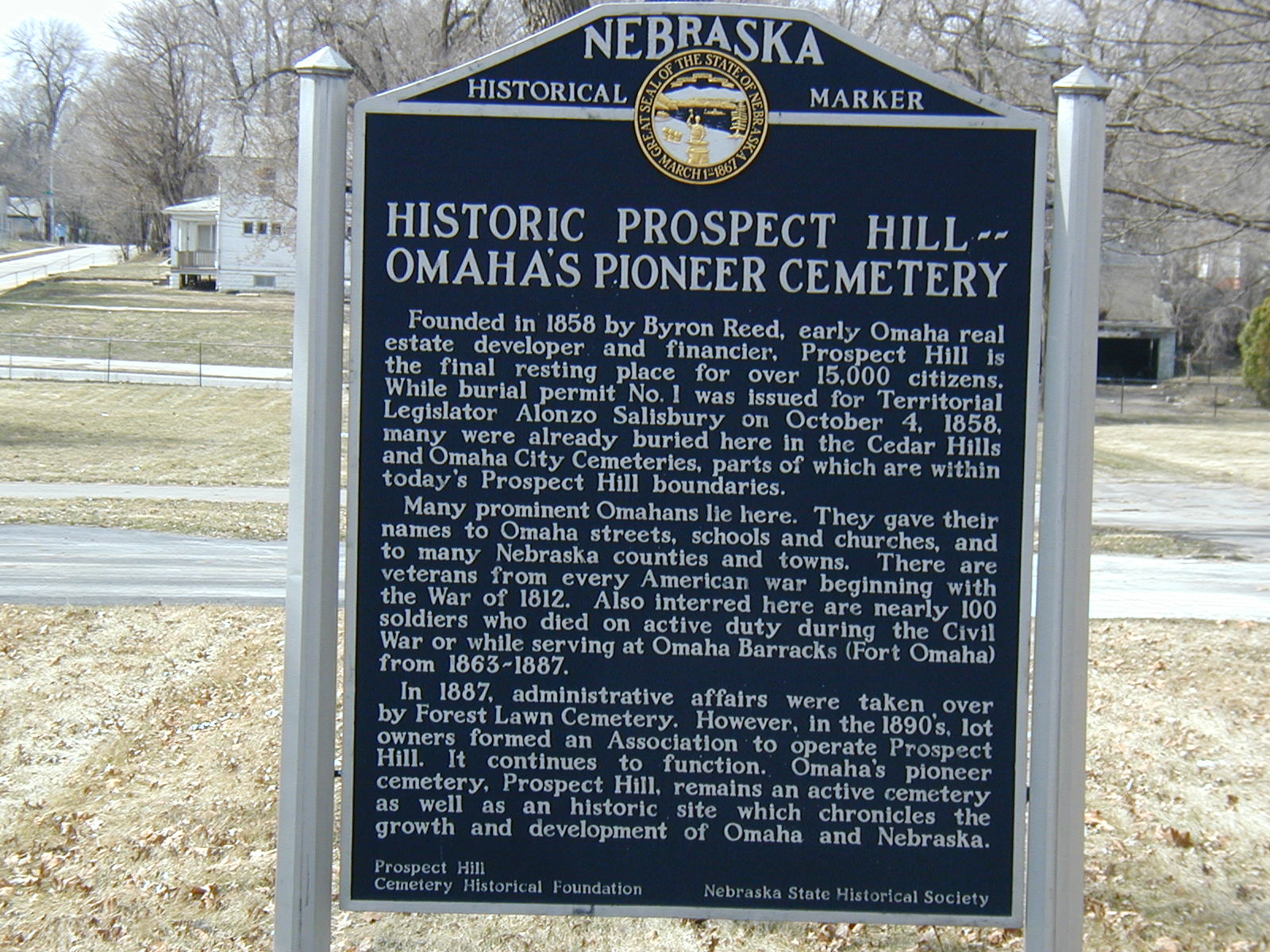
Historical marker for Omaha's pioneer Prospect Hill Cemetery

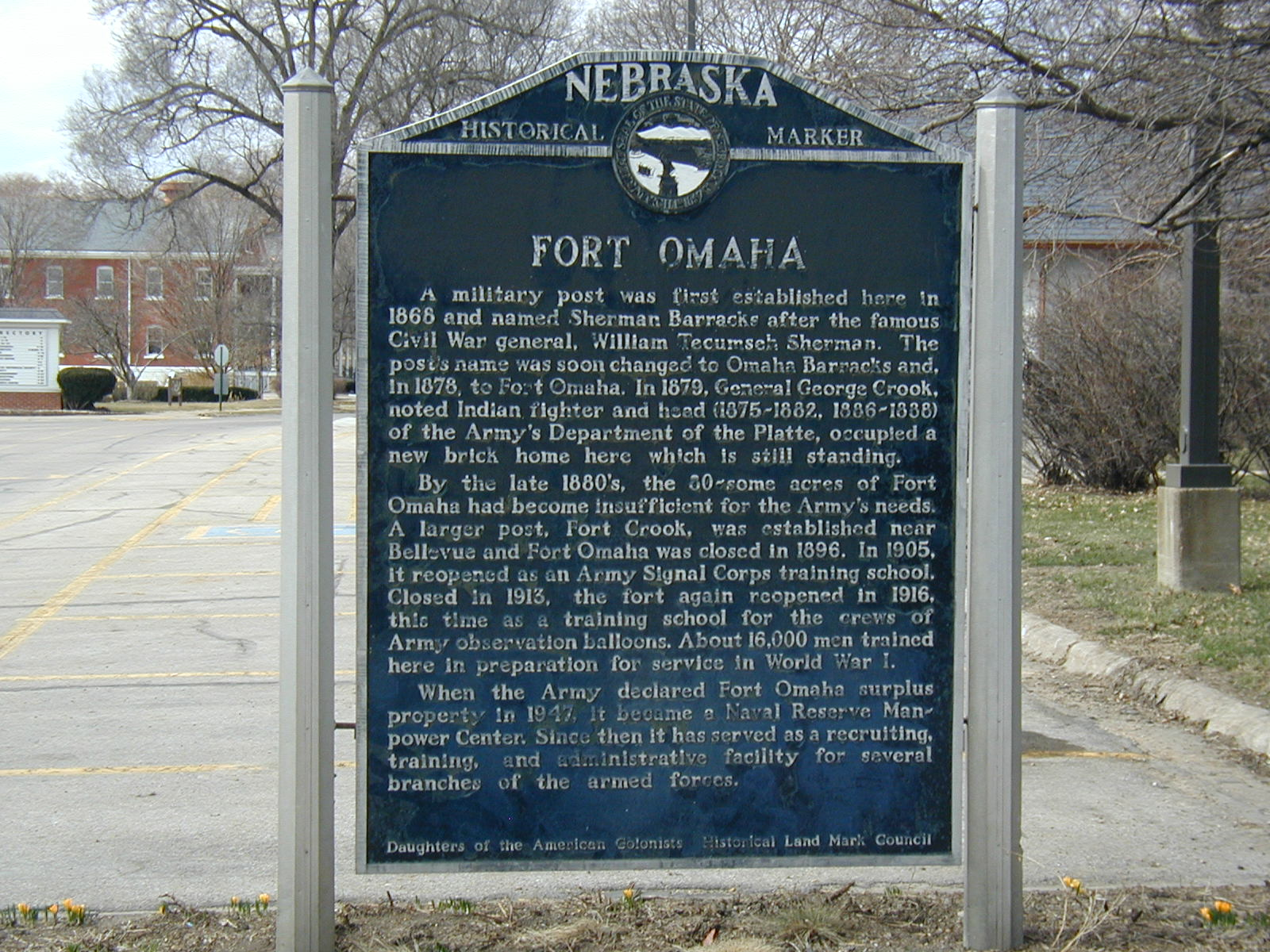
Historical marker for Fort Omaha

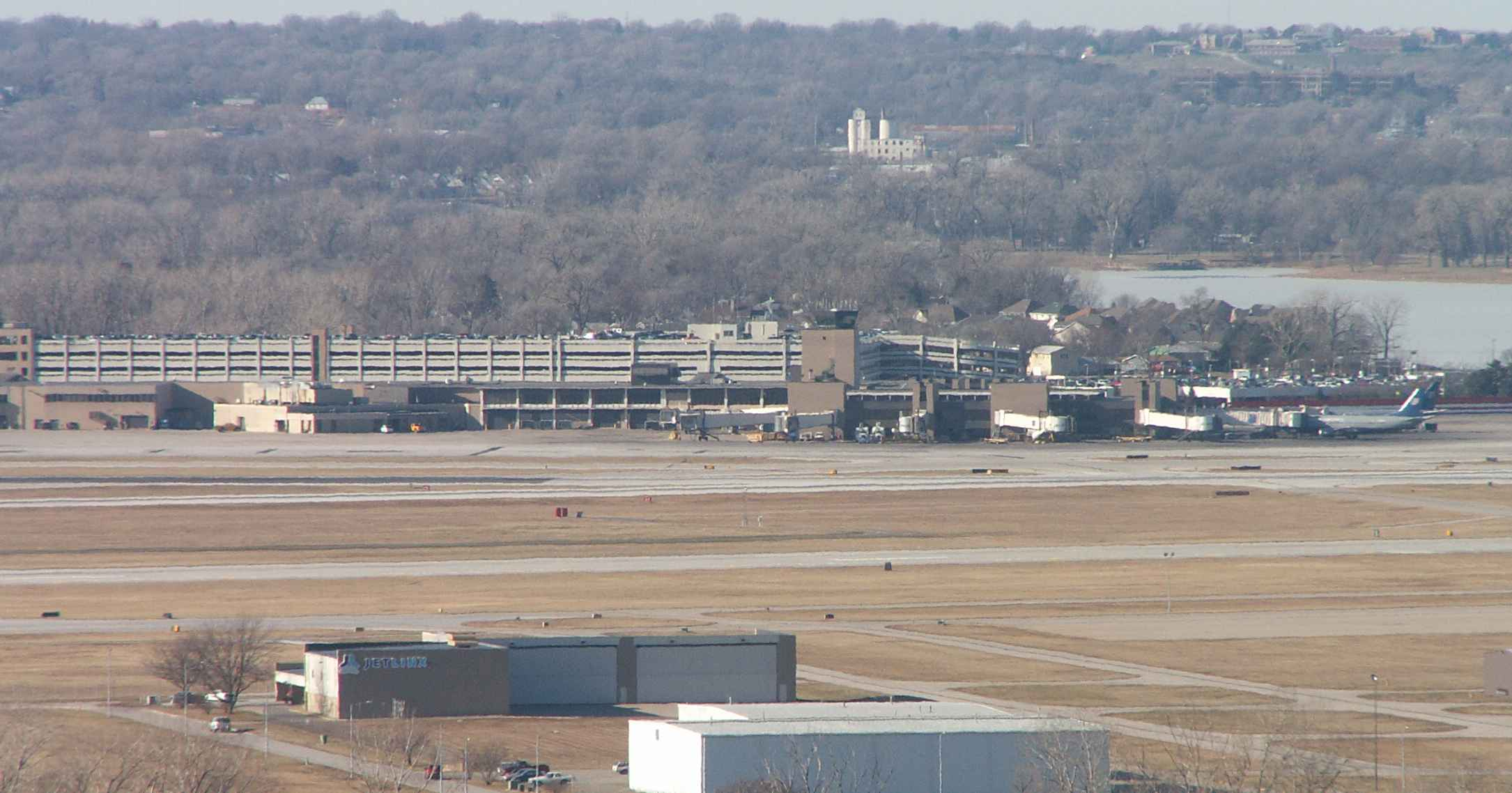
North Omaha above Eppley Airfield and Levi Carter Park

== Related publications ==
- Fletcher Sasse, Adam (2016) North Omaha History: Volume 1. Olympia, WA: CommonAction Publishing.
- Fletcher Sasse, Adam (2016) North Omaha History: Volume 2. Olympia, WA: CommonAction Publishing.
- Fletcher Sasse, Adam (2016) North Omaha History: Volume 3. Olympia, WA: CommonAction Publishing.
- Alexander, C. (1981) Rebirth of the Inner City: The North Omaha Plan. Center for Environmental Structure.
- (1992) The North Omaha Renaissance 2000 Plan. Ciaccio Dennell Group Inc.
- (2004) Housing Study: Omaha Housing Authority—Population & Housing Demand Profile.
- (n.d.) Multiethnic Guide. Greater Omaha Economic Partnership.
