= Commuter tax =

A commuter tax is a tax (generally on either income or wages) levied upon persons who work, but do not live, in a particular jurisdiction. The argument for a commuter tax is that it pays for public services, such as police, fire, and sanitation, received by and beneficial to people who work within the jurisdiction levying the commuter tax. Arguments against such a tax are that it acts as an incentive for businesses to relocate outside of the jurisdiction, along with their residents. In some cases, individual cities may be barred from enacting a commuter tax even though the state governments may impose a non-resident income tax. States may choose to enter "reciprocal tax agreements" to exempt non-residents from some local taxes.

Until 1999, New York City had a commuter tax, and there are periodic calls for its reinstatement. A commuter tax in New York City would need to have support from the State Legislature in order for reinstatement, and since the majority of state legislators represent people who do not live in New York City, the tax tends to be unpopular.

While the city of New York is barred from charging its own commuter tax, the state of New York does impose an income tax on non-residents that work in the state. In 2009, New York enacted the Metropolitan Commuter Transportation Mobility Tax, a 0.34% levy on payrolls and self-employment earnings in New York City and Nassau, Suffolk, Westchester, Rockland, Orange, Putnam, and Dutchess counties. This tax, known popularly as the "mobility tax", or the "MTA tax", is intended to provide funds for the Metropolitan Transportation Authority, which transports many of the region's commuters.

Philadelphia has a 3.924% wage tax on residents and a 3.495% tax on non-residents for wages earned in the city as of August 2013.

Washington, D.C., has sought to enact a commuter tax to recover costs of providing city services to the approximately 300,000 people who commute to the city from suburban Maryland and Virginia. However, in the 1973 District of Columbia Home Rule Act, the U.S. Congress barred the city from enacting such a tax .

== See also ==
- Employer transportation benefits in the United States
- Income tax
- Payroll tax
- Wheel tax
