= John A. Creighton Boulevard =

Road in Omaha, Nebraska

- Location: Omaha
- From: Hamilton Street 41°16′20″N 95°58′02″W
- To: Bedford Avenue 41°17′49″N 95°57′33″W

Construction
- Inauguration: = 1912

John A. Creighton Boulevard, is a boulevard-type north–south roadway in North Omaha, Nebraska. Running through the Adams Park neighborhood, the boulevard runs from Hamilton Avenue to Bedford Street. It originally ran from Lincoln Boulevard to Paxton Boulevard, ending in the Orchard Hill neighborhood.

In 1912 the City of Omaha spent almost $4,000 on expenses related to the finishing of this roadway, named in honor of Omaha philanthropist John A. Creighton. In recent years it has recently been the target of historic road preservationists intent on keeping the H.W.S. Cleveland-inspired design intact. Plans for the boulevard include upgrading the roadway, adding roundabouts and reconnecting the boulevard with its historic connecting streets.

== See also ==
- Boulevards in Omaha
- History of Omaha
