= NorthStar Foundation =

Organization based in Omaha, Nebraska

NorthStar Foundation is an Omaha foundation serving North Omaha's young males – from third grade to high school graduation – through academic, athletic and adventure programming with the goal of high school graduation and career readiness.

== History ==
The NorthStar Foundation 501(c)(3) was created in August 2007 by Scott Hazelrigg in partnership with the Board of Directors to address some of Greater Omaha’s greatest needs in before and after school programming.

== Program structure ==
The NorthStar Foundation is focused on developing an exciting before and after school model that places youth in a safe and secure environment with mentors, staff, and peers, who share common goals that focus on self-reliance, self-actualization, and accountability. At the heart of NorthStar are five program areas of emphasis:

- Academic Achievement
- Athletics & Healthy Lifestyles
- Adventure & Experiential Learning
- Arts Immersion
- Actualization & Employment Readiness

== Board of directors ==
Richard "Dick" Holland, Chairman
J. Robert "Bob" Kerrey, Vice Chair
Scott Hazelrigg, President
Susie Buffett, Secretary
Tim Clark
John "Buzz" Garlock
Ben Gray
Larry Trussell
