= Florence Boulevard =

Street in Omaha, Nebraska, US

- Location: Omaha
- South end: North 19th and Chicago Streets 41°15′45.82″N 95°56′27.87″W
- North end: J.J. Pershing Drive 41°19′37.79″N 95°56′58.38″W

Construction
- Inauguration: 1892

Florence Boulevard, originally known as the Prettiest Mile in Omaha Boulevard, is a boulevard-type north-south street in the northern part of Omaha, Nebraska. With the start of construction in 1892, Florence Boulevard was the first roadway in Omaha's boulevard system designed by Horace Cleveland. It was also the first in Omaha to be fully lit with electric lamps.

Today the boulevard navigates the neighborhoods of the Near North Side, including Conestoga Place, and goes north through Kountze Place, Miller Park, and the southern end of Florence, where it merges with J.J. Pershing Drive.

== About ==
Originally called "The Prettiest Mile in Omaha Boulevard", it was renamed after the construction of other boulevards throughout the city. Sharing its name with the town of Florence located north of Omaha, both were named after Florence Kilbourn, a niece of a settler who helped organize the Florence Land Company in 1854.

Florence Boulevard was originally designed to connect the city's new Miller Park with the rest of Omaha, and was designed to capture the best views of the Missouri River valley. Florence Boulevard was popular for recreational drives, first by carriage and bicycle and later by car. Tall sycamores, attractive homes and elaborately flowered medians lined the length nearest to Miller Park, and the boulevard became known as "The Prettiest Mile". Because of its level construction and absence of street car rail tracks intersecting it, Florence Boulevard was also called "the only suitable driveway in Omaha".

== History ==
On October 10, 1892, the City of Omaha started building Florence Boulevard. The initial stretch of the Boulevard was constructed north from Ames Avenue to just north of Kansas Street, near the future location of Miller Park. In 1897 an existing linear road configuration along 19th and 20th Streets between Chicago and Ames was improved with landscaping and the addition of land. The Omaha Park Commission took authority of the boulevard in 1897, and the strip became the south part of Florence Boulevard.

In 1912 the city spent almost $6,000 on expenses related to the maintenance of Florence Boulevard, which then commenced at North 19th and Chicago Streets, went west to 20th Street, north to Ames Avenue, and north to Miller Park. It was reported that year that Florence Boulevard was the first roadway in Omaha to be fully lit with electric lamps.

== Present ==
The boulevard remains today, although minus the park-like setting for the majority of its length. The last remainder of the landscaping remains from Fort Street north to Read Street. The City of Omaha has recently been the target of criticism over a poorly redesigned intersection along the northern section of Florence Boulevard. Notable sites along Florence Boulevard include King Science and Technology Magnet Center and Morrison Stadium.

== See also ==
- Boulevards in Omaha
- History of Omaha
