= ECreamery =

American ice cream retailer

eCreamery Ice Cream and Gelato
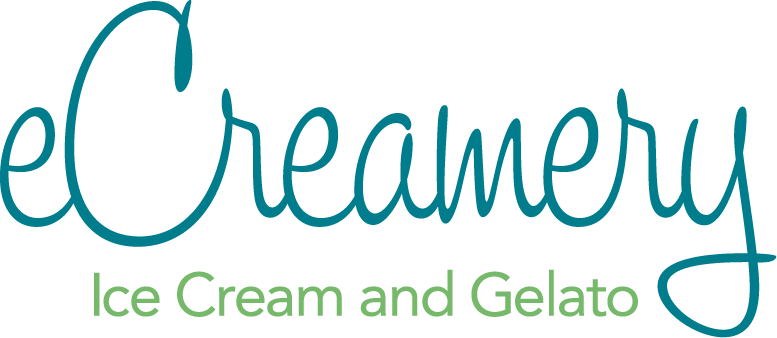
- Type: Privately held company
- Industry: Food industry
- Founded: Omaha, Nebraska in 2002
- Founder: Abby Jordan and Becky App
- Headquarters: Omaha, Nebraska, United States
- Area served: United States
- Key people: Abby Jordan (CEO, Owner), Becky App (Owner), Jim Paschal (President, Owner)
- Products: Ice cream, gelato, sorbet, and desserts
- Website: ecreamery.com

eCreamery is an American ice cream, gelato and sorbet retailer headquartered in Omaha, Nebraska. The company began selling online and shipping customized products nationwide in 2008.

== History ==
In 2007 Becky App and Abby Jordan formed eCreamery Gourmet Ice Cream, Sorbet and Gelato in a small parlor in Omaha, Nebraska. Beginning in 2008, the pair started shipping their personalized ice cream offerings nationwide. In 2012, the company was featured on ABC's Shark Tank.

In 2015, the company outgrew production capabilities at the parlor and opened a shipping warehouse and commercial kitchen.

In 2019, eCreamery merged with Carson's Cookie Fix of Omaha, Nebraska, which specializes in custom, hand decorated cookies.

eCreamery Ice Cream is also distributed throughout the Omaha metro area HyVee grocery stores, select Omaha restaurants, and area theaters.
