= Wheel tax =

A wheel tax is a vehicle registration fee commonly used on automobiles generally less than 8000 pounds in the United States by some cities and counties. The problem that a wheel tax attempts to solve is that many people come into a community from outside to work and, as a result, use the community's roads, water, sewer, and so forth, but pay no taxes into the community as a result of living outside of the municipality. It is an example of a problem in governance sometimes called the free rider problem. The tax is charged to motorists based upon the vehicle's weight, and it is often collected at the time of annual vehicle registration renewals. A proposed wheel tax in Omaha was fifty dollars per year.

Proponents have argued that wheel taxes are fair since persons who drive into a community without paying taxes to that specific community contribute to the wear-and-tear of public roadways, and therefore they should pay for the upkeep. Critics of wheel taxes have argued that wheel taxes are not fair since they are an example of taxation without representation since the people taxed have no political representation within the community.

Chicago has a wheel tax, which is actually a registration fee that is imposed on city residents and businesses, rather than outsiders. Many suburbs of Chicago such as Evanston have also adopted residents-only vehicle registration fees (also called a wheel tax by some of the municipalities). Enforcement of the collection of registration fees has sometimes been expedited by the use of cameras. Authorities can search car registration records to identify what city a car's registered owner lives in, and can issue a tax based on that information.

== See also ==
- Commuter tax
- Road tax
- Free rider problem
