= Metcalfe Park =

Park in Omaha, Nebraska

Coordinates: 41°16′31″N 95°59′31″W

Metcalfe Park is a small park bearing the namesake of the surrounding neighborhood of Metcalfe, Omaha, Nebraska, located at 1700 Country Club Avenue. One lap around the park perimeter sidewalk (excluding the playground area) is equivalent to 1/3 mile (almost 0.5 km). It occupies approximately 4 acres and is bounded by Decatur St (north), Happy Hollow Ave (south), 51st St (west) and Country Club Ave (east).

== History ==
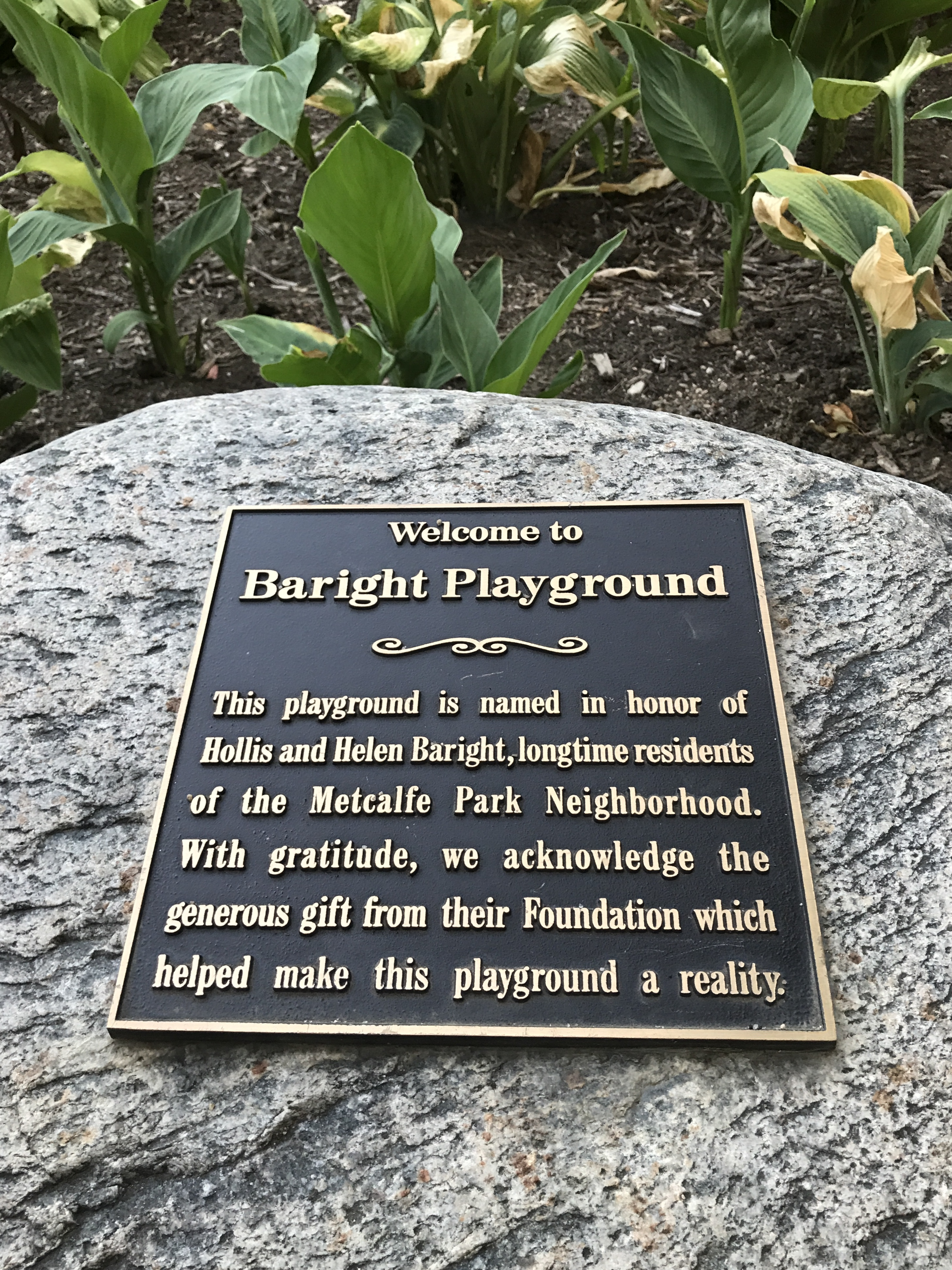
A brass plaque naming the playground in honor of Helen and Hollis Baright.

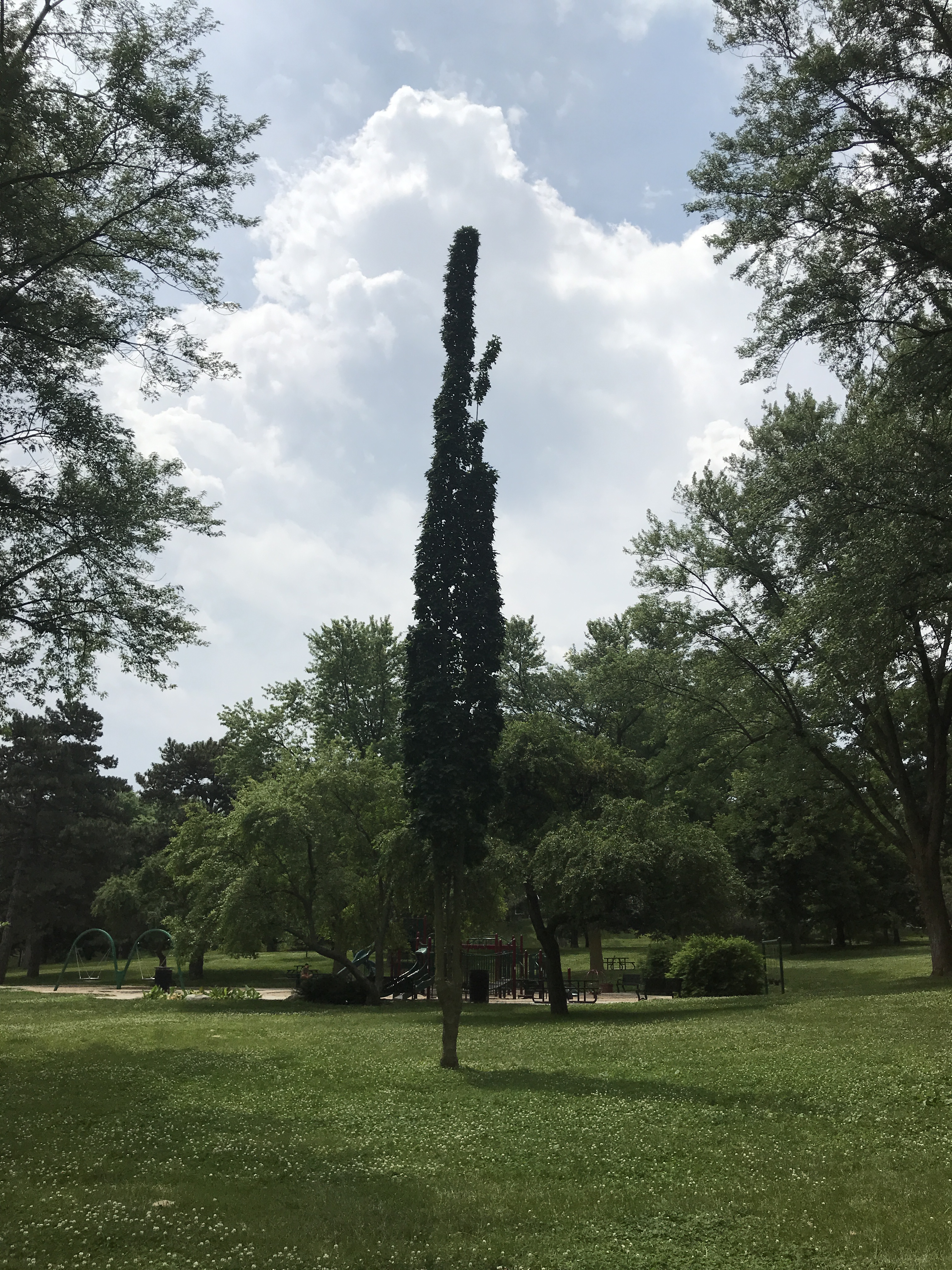
The Pencil Tree has inspired children and artists alike who visit the park.

In 1938 the park and surrounding four-acre plot was named Metcalfe Park for former mayor of Omaha, Richard Lee Metcalfe. Original plans indicate it was intended to be residential lots.

Starting in 2010, residents (including neighborhood children) and local businesses paired with the Hollis and Helen Baright Foundation to raise funds to replace the existing playground with new equipment, a rain garden, picnic tables and benches. Work was finished in 2012. The Barights lived for a long time across the street from the park.

A Little Free Library (Charter #11929) was added at summer 2014.

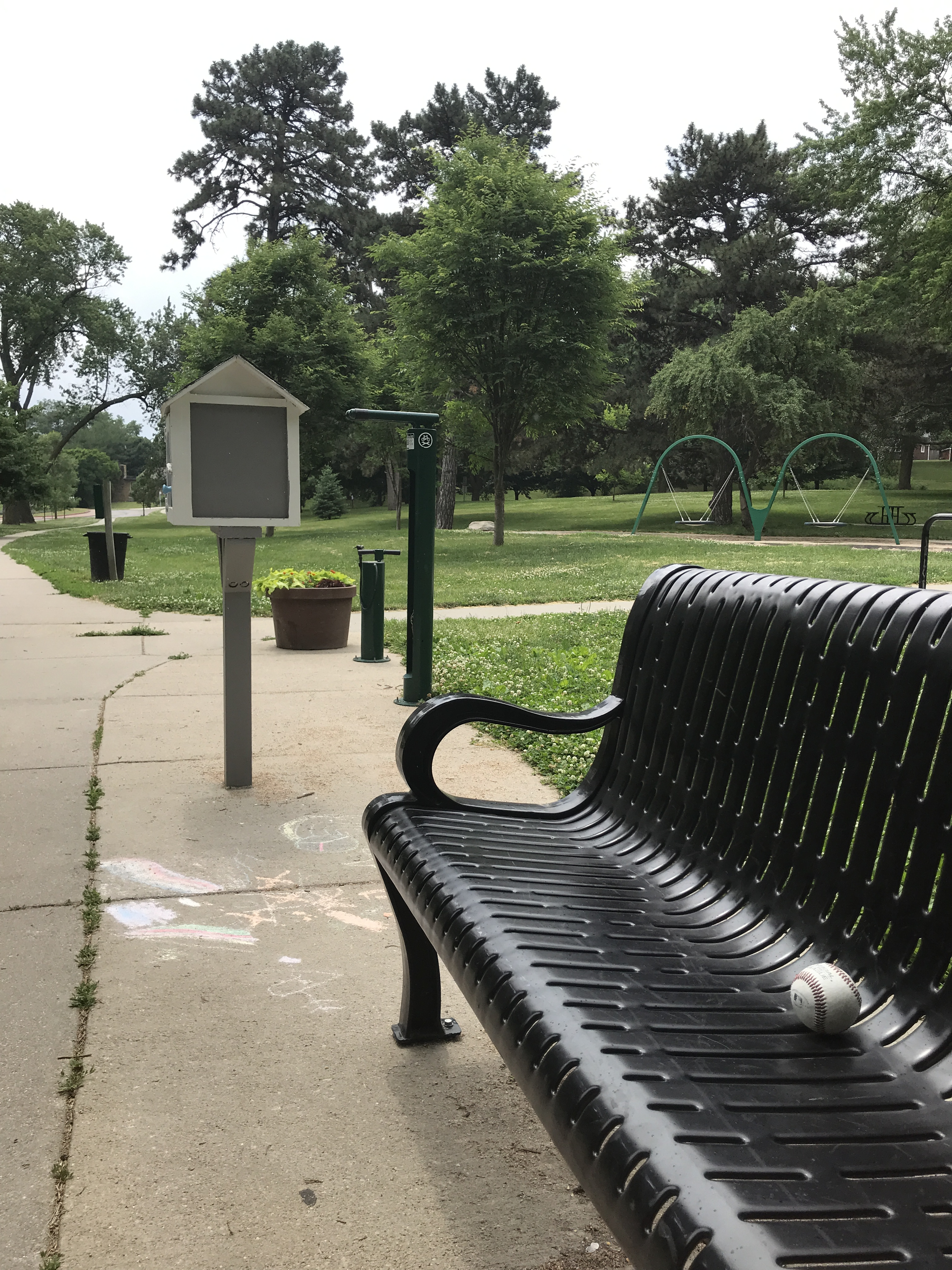
There are many features for a park of this size.

In 2018, a Dero FixIt bike repair stand and tire pump were installed.

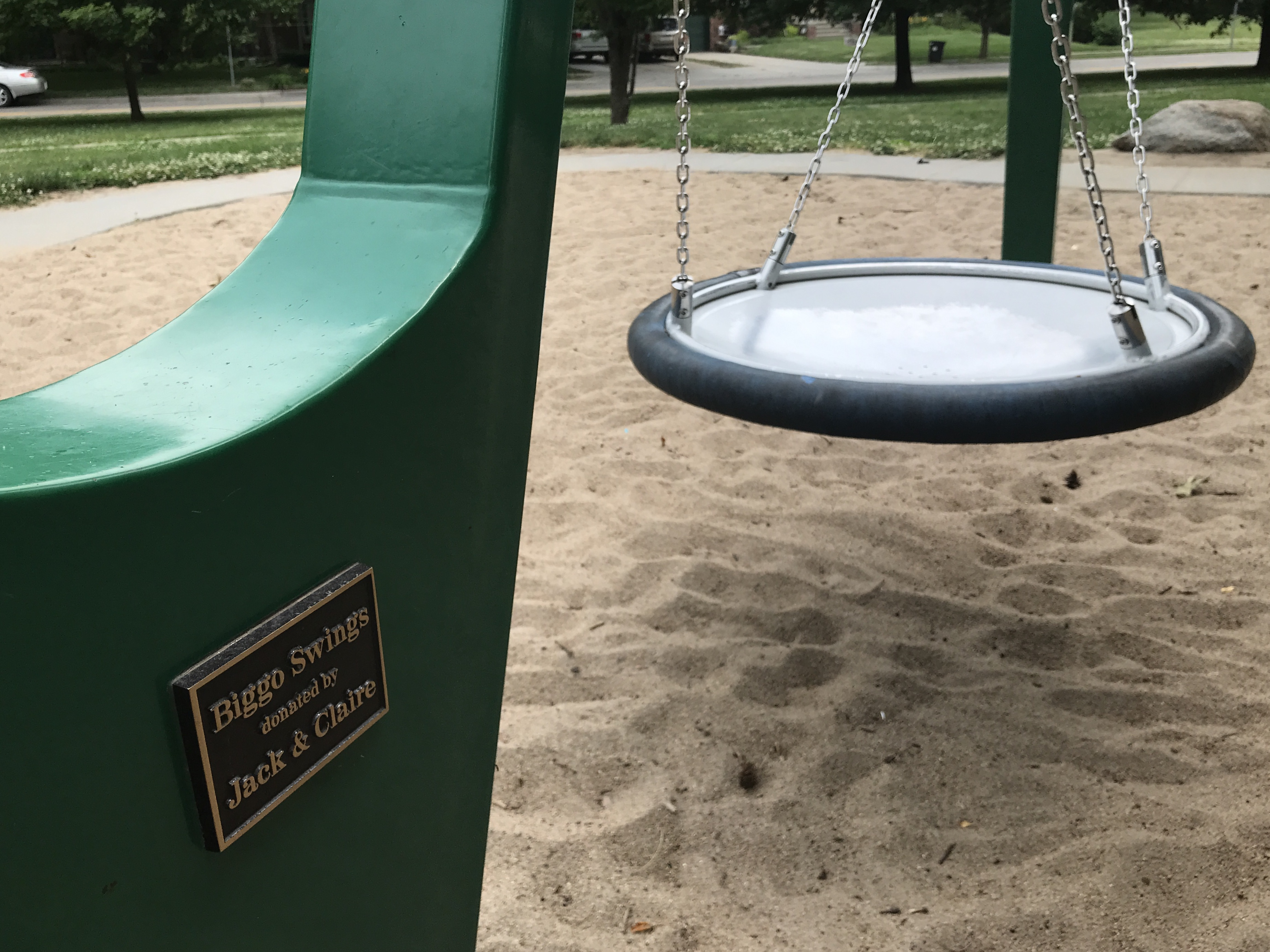
These are some unique Biggo swings donated by a couple children, Jack and Claire, for the benefit of park visitors.

All city park playgrounds were closed during the Coronavirus Pandemic in 2020, including Metcalfe Park. At that time, the Little Free Library doubled as a little free pantry where food goods were left for those affected economically during the resulting crash.

== Facilities ==
The park includes the Hollis and Helen Baright Playground. A long sloping green is popular with kids, dogs and adults for soccer, lacrosse, catch and playing fetch, with “the pencil tree” often playing the role of home base. Other features include a Little Free Library, a bike repair stand with tools and tire pump, three pet waste bag stations, a rain garden and a sundial.

The park also has multiple poke stops for Pokémon Go around the perimeter.
