= Miller Park (Omaha, Nebraska) =

Neighborhood and park of same name in Omaha, Nebraska, US

- Omaha Neighborhood
- Etymology: Named after George L. Miller
- Interactive map of Miller Park
- Coordinates: 41°18′30″N 95°57′24″W
- Country: United States
- State: Nebraska
- City: Omaha
- Time zone: UTC-6 (CST)
  - Summer (DST): UTC-5 (CDT)

Miller Park is a neighborhood in North Omaha, Nebraska named for Dr. George L. Miller. It features the historically significant Minne Lusa Residential Historic District and a municipal park of the same name.

Originally bound by Belt Line Rail Road on the south and Kansas Avenue on the north, it has grown with the addition of Belle Isle in 1914 and Minne Lusa in 1916. The area is now bounded by Redick Avenue on the north, Sorenson Parkway on the south, Florence Boulevard on the east, and 30th Street on the west.

== Minne Lusa Historic District ==
- Minne Lusa Residential Historic District
- U.S. National Register of Historic Places
- U.S. Historic district
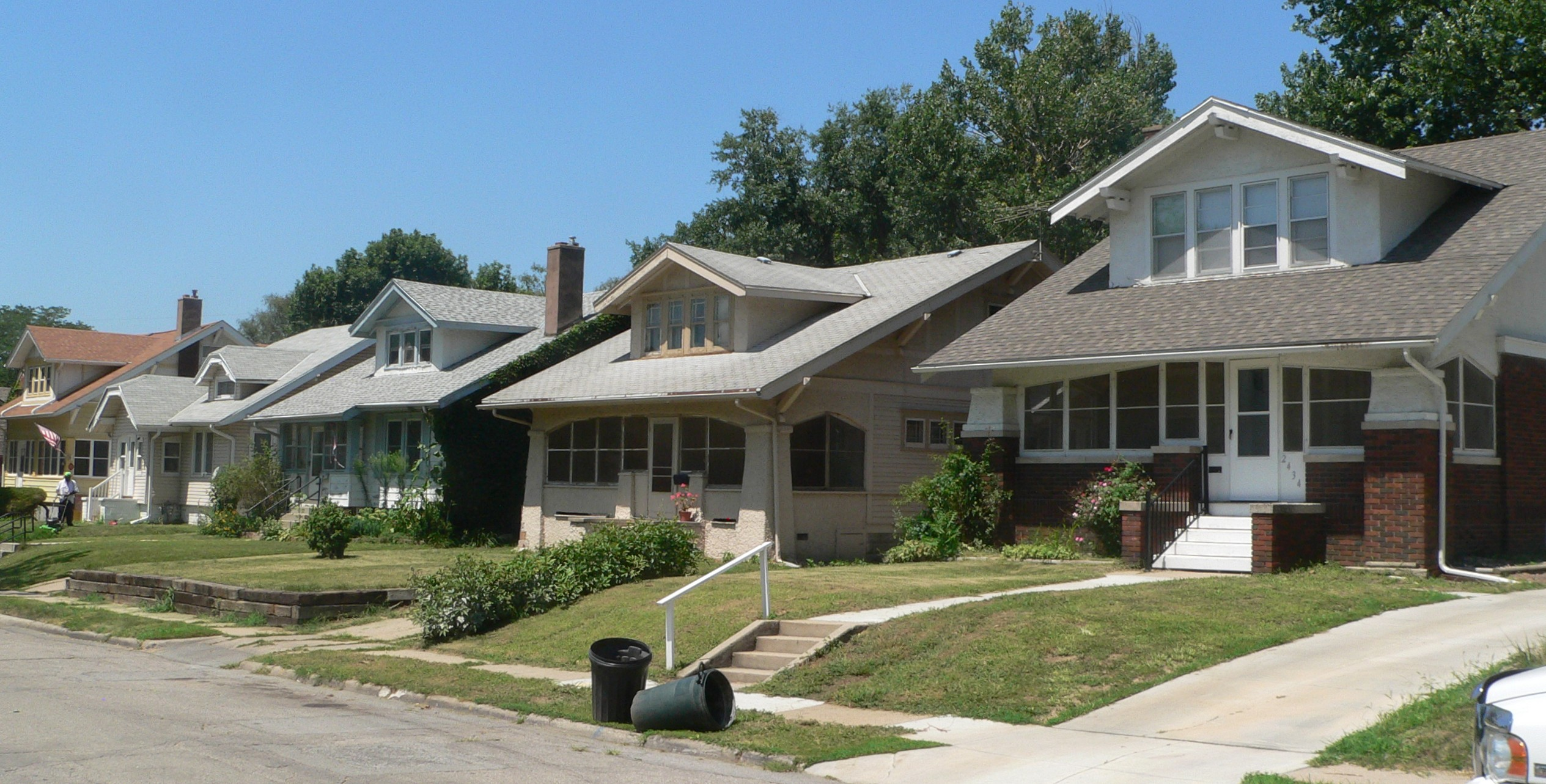
- Houses on Bauman Avenue

- Location within Nebraska Location within the United States
- Location: Omaha, Nebraska
- Coordinates: 41°19′14″N 95°57′06″W
- Architect: Everett Dodd
- Architectural style: Late 19th And 20th Century Revivals, Late 19th And Early 20th Century American Movements
- NRHP reference No.: 14000178
- Added to NRHP: April 25, 2014

Located just north of the municipal park, the Minne Lusa Residential Historic District is centered around Minne Lusa Avenue. It is bounded by Vane Street on the north, Redick Avenue on the south, North 24th Street on the east, and North 30th Street on the west, including all of the area originally known as the Minne Lusa Addition. According to the National Register of Historic Places listing, the Minne Lusa Residential Historic District is an "example of a substantial, affordable single-family residential development within the city limits that was platted, developed and constructed by a single firm between 1915 and 1941". Common architecture includes bungalows, Craftsman, and other styles that were popular in the era. According to the Omaha Public Library, the name "Minne Lusa" was derived from a Sioux word, meaning "clear water", but it is more likely a mis-translation of "Manuel Lisa", a Spanish fur trader the creek is named after.

Development began in 1916, shortly after the banker who owned the farmland sold it to James Parker, a real estate developer in Omaha. Parker's intention was to create homes for a growing middle-class population that would need transit to the city since streetcar routes were already established through the area.

=== Minne Lusa Water Works ===
The Minne Lusa Pumping Station, demolished by the city in the 1960s, was a massive building of Warrensburg sandstone with a central tower rising four stories over an arched entrance. Designed by Omaha architects, it was built in 1889 in a classical style reflecting the influence of the 1898 Trans-Mississippi Exposition. This building contained the high service pump and boilers, and sent the filtered water to city water mains for the entire city of Omaha.

== Urban park ==
Miller Park
- Muncipal Park in Omaha
- Interactive map of Miller Park
- Type: Municipal (Omaha)
- Location: North Omaha, Nebraska
- Coordinates: 41°18′57″N 95°57′06″W
- Area: 79 acres (320,000 m^{2})
- Created: 1891
- Status: Open all year
- Website: https://parks.cityofomaha.org/miller-park-pavilion/

Miller Park is a municipal park in North Omaha established in 1892 and included in the recently created Prettiest Mile in Omaha Boulevard, a thoroughfare meant to connect Omaha's best views of the Missouri River valley. It was one of several sites initially considered for the Trans-Mississippi Exposition of 1898, and selected as the official site for the fairgrounds in February of 1897. A month later, the site was moved again when a better location became available.

A wooden pavilion was constructed on a small lagoon island in 1908, and a golf course was added in 1916.

== Fort Omaha ==
The Miller Park neighborhood is home to the Fort Omaha Historic District. Inside the Fort there are dozens of historical buildings, with the Guard House designated by the City of Omaha as an Omaha Landmark, and the General Crook House listed independently on the National Register of Historic Places.

== See also ==
- History of Omaha
- Parks in Omaha
- Neighborhoods of North Omaha, Nebraska
- Architecture of North Omaha, Nebraska
