= City Sprouts =

Coordinates: 41.2743°N 95.9729°W

- Purpose: Community Garden
- Location: Omaha, Nebraska
- Founded: 1995

City Sprouts is a community garden, urban farm, and educational resource center in the Orchard Hill neighborhood of Omaha, Nebraska. Founded in 1995, City Sprouts is the oldest community garden in the city. The organization is registered as a 501(c)(3) not-for profit entity.

The mission of City Sprouts is to use urban agriculture as a platform to develop equitable food systems, provide educational opportunities, and build community.

Through gardening with City Sprouts, students are provided the opportunity to develop employment skills.

== History ==
City Sprouts formed as a group in 1995, as a response to help foster community connection after a murder that had occurred in the Orchard Hill neighborhood.

== Events ==
City Sprouts hosts regular events and workshops in the Learning Center, including classes on topics such as permaculture, and canning and preserving.

One of the main fundraising events for City Sprouts each year is a Gala in the fall, frequently hosted at Lauritzen Gardens.
