= Bemis Park Landmark Heritage District =

Coordinates: 41°16′12″N 95°58′08″W

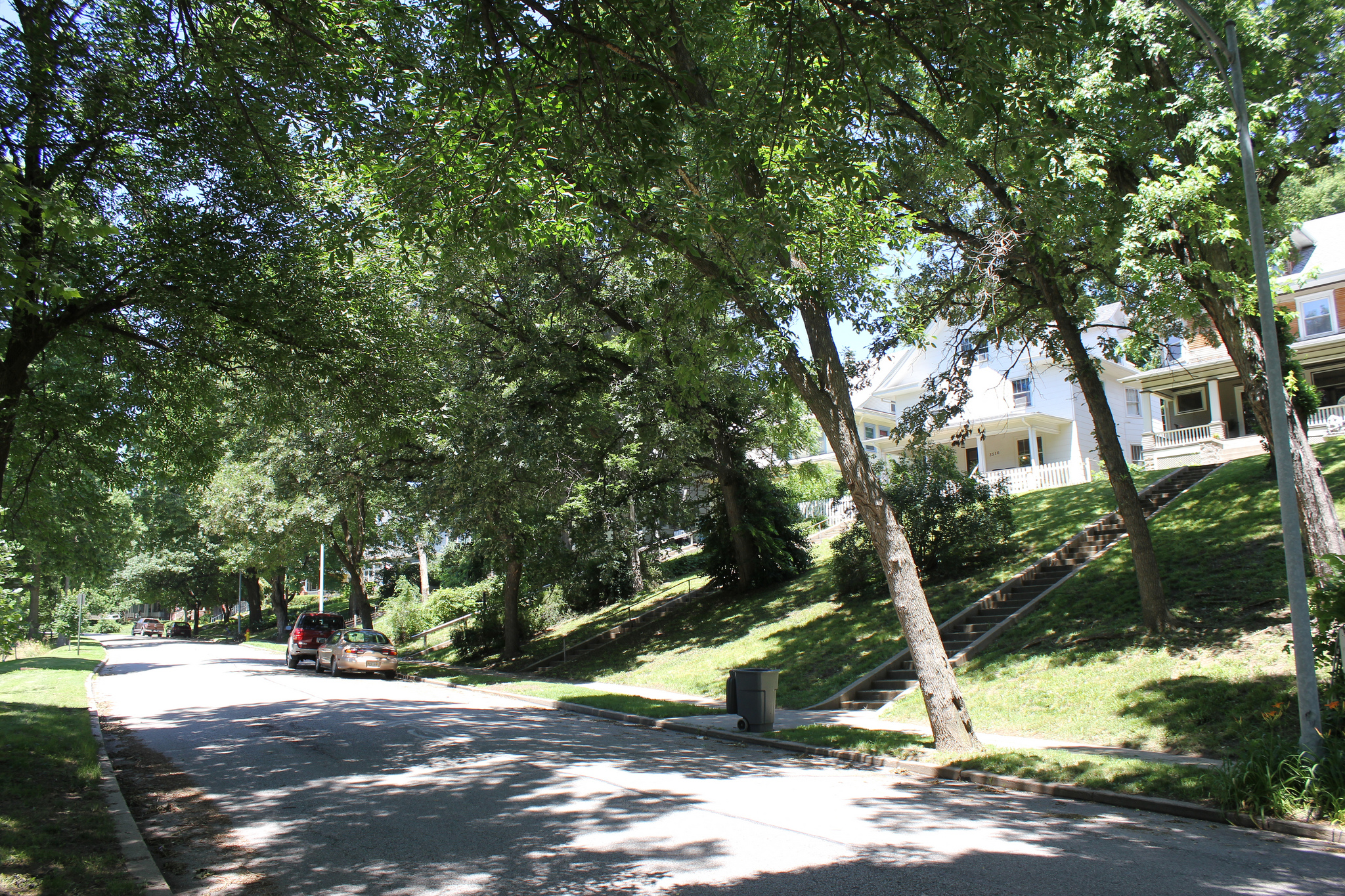
- Interactive map of Bemis Park Landmark Heritage District
- Neighborhood: Bemis Park
- Established: 1887
- Website: link

Omaha Landmark
- Designated: December 20, 1983

The Bemis Park Landmark Heritage District is located in North Omaha, Nebraska. Situated from Cuming Street to Hawthorne Avenue, Glenwood Avenue to 33rd Street, Bemis Park was annexed into Omaha in 1887, and developed from 1889 to 1922. The district was designated an Omaha Landmark in 1983.

== History ==
George Bemis's Bemis Land Company platted this exclusive subdivision in 1889. His namesake park was part of Omaha's parks and boulevard system, and the neighborhood's tree-lined streets were the first in Omaha to be laid out according to topography rather than the grid pattern used throughout the rest of the city.

The Bemis Park Landmark Heritage District is notable for its mix of late nineteenth and early twentieth century homes. Architecture in Bemis Park includes Queen Anne, Arts and Crafts and Neo-Classical style buildings as well as vernacular structures. The district includes a park donated to the city by the subdivision's developer George Bemis and designed as a part of the then developing Omaha parks and boulevard system.

The neighborhood was devastated by the Easter Day Tornado of 1913. According to one report, "This beautiful section of Omaha had been completely ruined. The pretty homes that adorned the graceful winding driveways were beyond redemption. The trees had been broken off short at the base, and many of them were even uprooted. One great home had been turned turtle onto the roof of the house adjoining it on the east."

In the 1940s, Bemis Park was home to workers from the new Mutual of Omaha headquarters, teachers at the nearby Tech High School, or employees of the Methodist Hospital.

According to the City of Omaha, the proposed Bemis Park Residential Historic District is eligible for the National Register of Historic Places.

== Historic properties ==
Historic properties in Bemis Park in alphabetical order
Name	Address	Built	Notes
George Payne House	3602 Lincoln Boulevard	1908	Dutch Colonial Revival architecture
Porter-Thomsen House	3426 Lincoln Boulevard	1902	Georgian Revival architecture
Zabriskie House	3524 Hawthorne Avenue	1889	Considered one of the finest Queen Anne style houses in Omaha.

== See also ==
- Neighborhoods of Omaha, Nebraska
- History of Omaha
