= Lincoln Boulevard (Omaha) =

Street in Omaha, Nebraska, USA

Coordinates: 41°16′06″N 95°58′12″W

- Interactive map of Lincoln Boulevard
- Location: Omaha
- From: Dodge Street and Turner Blvd
- Major junctions: North 28 Street
- To: Mercer Boulevard

Construction
- Commissioned: 1891

Lincoln Boulevard in Omaha, Nebraska was built in the early 1890s as part of the city's boulevard system under control of the Board of Park Commissioners. It runs through the Bemis Park neighborhood west-east from Mercer Boulevard to its end at North 29 Street; it then reemerges immediately north of Dodge Street, where it intersects with Turner Boulevard.

== History ==
When the Bemis Land Company platted the Bemis Park subdivision in 1889 it donated 6-acre (24,000 m^{2}) tract to the Omaha Board of Park Commissioners. As part of the city's boulevard and parks plan designed by Horace Cleveland that same year, Mayor George Bemis was convinced to create a strolling boulevard that started at his park and meandered east towards Creighton University. The boulevard was developed to Cleveland's plans, which preserved the natural features of the area's undulating hillsides.

Many homes along Lincoln Boulevard were demolished by the Easter Sunday Tornado of 1913. Striking the boulevard at about North 35 Street, it uprooted trees and obliterated houses littered the roadway, damage from which much of the area never recovered.

In the 1960s a large portion of Lincoln Boulevard was lost during the construction of I-480. Today the only segment of significant length lies between 30th Street and Mercer Boulevard.

== See also ==
- Boulevards in Omaha
- History of Omaha
