= Dundee–Happy Hollow Historic District =

Historic district in Nebraska, United States

- U.S. National Register of Historic Places
- U.S. Historic district
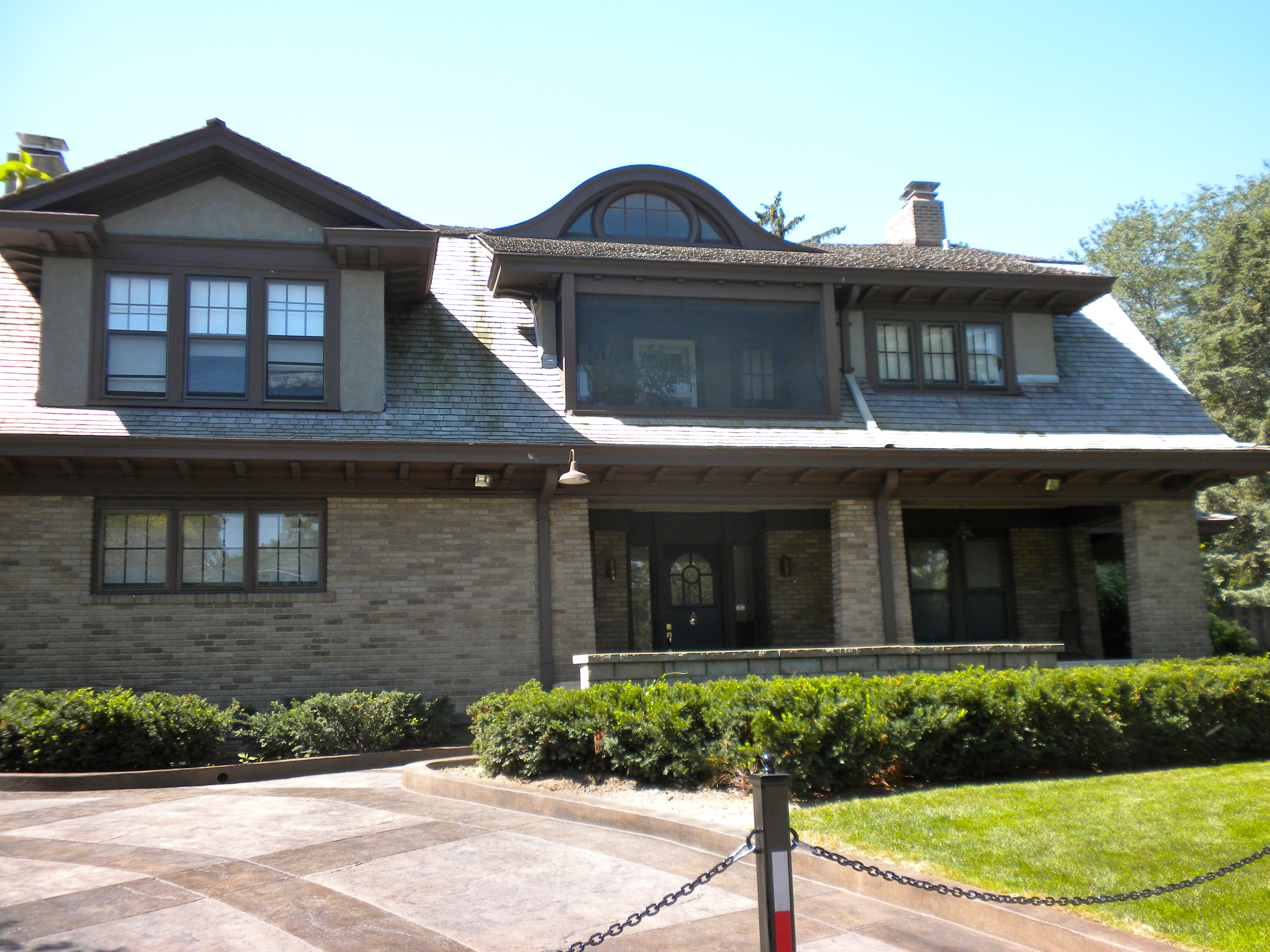
- The home of Warren Buffett which he bought for $31,500 in 1958

- Location within Nebraska Location within the United States
- Location: Omaha, Nebraska
- Coordinates: 41.25967702562128°N 95.99027600860862°W
- Architect: Thomas Rogers Kimball; John and Alan McDonald; others
- Architectural style: Late 19th And 20th Century Revivals, Late 19th And Early 20th Century American Movements
- NRHP reference No.: 05000726
- Added to NRHP: July 22, 2005

The Dundee–Happy Hollow Historic District is located west of Midtown Omaha, Nebraska. It covers the area between Harney Street on the south, Hamilton Street on the north, Happy Hollow Boulevard on the west, and 46th Street on the east. The "heart" of Dundee is located at 50th and Underwood Avenue in Omaha, Nebraska, United States. It was founded in 1880 and annexed into the city in 1915. Dundee is home to Warren Buffett and nationally syndicated editorial cartoonist Jeff Koterba and was the hometown of filmmaker Alexander Payne. Actor Henry Fonda additionally lived in the Dundee neighborhood.

== History ==
The neighborhood was developed in 1880 and has been dubbed Omaha's first suburb.

The Shannon Brothers of Kansas City were hired to construct six homes between 48th and 52nd Street, Capitol to California. The brothers had just converted the Kansas City Fairgrounds on the edge of Downtown Kansas City into a planned residential development called Dundee Place and they hoped to do the same in Omaha. Unlike other suburban development where the houses look similar, the houses in Dundee were built to look distinctive.

The Omaha Herald on October 30, 1888 noted neighborhood covenants required that the buildings be for residential purposes only, stand at least 25 feet away from the street, cost at least $2500, and not be "used for any immoral or illegal business, nor shall any spirits or malt liquors be sold or bartered away."

The houses did not initially sell well and the developers set out to create the neighborhood as a self-contained village. Developers planted 2,000 maple trees along the roadways (one of which was named Underwood for one of the developers). In 1905 developer Luke Toot O'Keefe offered free lots if the buyer built. If the buyer stayed for more than a year he got a bonus of $500. Interest in the neighborhood skyrocketed and the developers expanded to be south of Dodge Street and north of Cuming Street.

C.C. and J.E. George laid out Happy Hollow Boulevard and developed the area south of Dodge and west of 50th to Elmwood Park. They filled in the creek that ran along 50th Street and added sidewalks and the Dundee lights. Homes in the area reflected the Colonial, Georgian and Tudor Revival styles. Omaha annexed Dundee on June 20, 1915. At that time it was 0.7 mi^{2} (1.8 km^{2}) and had 2500 residents.

The district includes 30 known works by Omaha architect F. A. Henninger.

=== World War II bombing ===
In April 1945 a Japanese fire balloon exploded over Dundee. The incident was part of a large World War II campaign by the Japanese military to cause mass chaos in American cities. However, the story was suppressed by the American military until after the war was over. Nobody was hurt in the explosion.

== Education ==
This central Omaha neighborhood is home to Dundee Elementary School, which is in the Omaha Public Schools district. Brownell-Talbot School is a historic, traditionally Episcopalian school. St. Margaret Mary's school is the local Catholic school. SMM was rated the city's best private school when it received the "Blue Ribbon Award" in 2006. On the outskirts of Dundee is Harrison Elementary School, which is also part of the Omaha Public Schools. Most children from the two OPS elementary schools attend Lewis & Clark Middle School, and then Omaha Central High School. The area is renowned for its numerous historic residences.

== Parks and attractions ==
Two major area parks are in the neighborhood are Memorial Park and Elmwood Park. St. Margaret Mary Catholic Church and Dundee Presbyterian Church (the church Warren Buffett attended and in which he was married) are among many congregations in Dundee. The area is home to numerous businesses, including the Dundee Dell, the Dundee Theatre, the Blue Line Coffee Shop, Exist Green Zero Waste Market and Refillery, the Underwood Bar, and eCreamery Ice Cream and Gelato. The area is promoted and preserved by the Dundee-Memorial Park Association. St. Margaret Mary Catholic Church and the associated school are known for extreme pride in their neighborhood. Dundee annually hosts Dundee Day, featuring a neighborhood festival and dance showdown.

Warren Buffett, the "Oracle of Omaha", lives in a house bought for $31,500 in 1958 in Dundee ($340,000 in 2024), on the corner of Farnam and 55th. The average sales price of a home in Dundee as of December 31st, 2023 is $379,544.

Dundee Community Garden, located on 49th and Underwood, serves as a neighborhood common space open to the public. Plots for planting are available to community members for a nominal fee. Members of the garden routinely provide free vegetables from the communal beds to underserved population in the community.

== American Planning Association's Great American Places of 2011 ==
Dundee-Memorial Park district has been named one of APA's Great American Places of 2011 because of the neighborhoods pro-active vibrant community. The community has developed a street car plan and they seek National Register status. The community also created an adopt-a-streetlight program with efforts to restore 328 historic cast-iron poles. They pushed to be named a neighborhood conservation and enhancement district. The neighborhood offers a variety of architecture as well as two major parks in Omaha, Nebraska. The city has made many substantial efforts to improve the daily life within the neighborhood. They decided to allocate “$550,000 of $2.2 million needed to implement merchant-funded street-scape master plan (2009) to improve traffic flow, increase parking, and add amenities.” Dundee Neighborhood Conservation-Enhancement District Plan has also preserved a two block district for historical preservation.

== See also ==
- History of Omaha
