= Leaping Plum =

- Breed: Thoroughbred
- Sire: Lightning Leap
- Grandsire: Nijinsky II
- Dam: Velvet Plum
- Damsire: Dr Blum
- Sex: Gelding
- Foaled: February 16, 1991; Kentucky
- Died: July 16, 2017 (aged 26); Grand Island, Nebraska
- Colour: Chestnut
- Breeder: Marty Takacs
- Owner: Clyde Woods; Paul Miskimins
- Trainer: Joseph A. Moss
- Jockey: Newil Wall
- Record: 66: 29-9-12
- Earnings: $371,584

Major wins
- Grasmick Handicap (1995–2001, 2003); Coca-Cola Sprint Handicap (1995–1998); Tondi Budweiser Handicap (1995, 1998); Grand Island Eagles Handicap (1996); Atchison, Topeka and Santa Fe Handicap (1996)

Leaping Plum (February 16, 1991 – July 16, 2017) was an American Thoroughbred racehorse. He was most notable for winning the Grasmick Handicap at Fonner Park 8 times out of 10 overall starts. He won the race from 1995 to 2001 and again in 2003, the most victories in a single race by a single racehorse. In addition, he won the Coca-Cola Sprint Handicap 4 consecutive times from 1995 to 1998.

== Background ==
Leaping Plum was foaled on February 16, 1991, in Kentucky by Velvet Plum by Dr Blum, and was sired by Lightning Leap.

In September 1992, he was sold at the Keenland Yearling September sale (Hip: 3196) for $11,000 to Clyde Moss and Paul Miskimins.

== Career ==
=== 1993 ===
On November 10, Leaping Plum made his debut at Thistledown Race Course.

=== 1994 ===
Leaping Plum made 12 Allowance starts at Fonner Park, Ak-Sar-Ben, and again at Thistledown, winning 3 of them.

=== 1995 ===
Leaping Plum won his first of eight Grasmick Handicaps on February 18. He would follow it up with victories in the Coca-Cola Sprint Handicap, and Tondi Budweiser Handicap in April.

=== 1996 ===
Leaping Plum won his second Grasmick Handicap. He then won the Grand Island Eagles Handicap, followed by a second win in the Coca-Cola Sprint Handicap.

In September, he won the Atchison, Topeka and Santa Fe Handicap at The Woodlands. This was his only stakes victory outside of Nebraska.

=== 1997 ===
Leaping Plum won his third Grasmick Handicap, and Coca-Cola Sprint Handicap respectively.

=== 1998 ===
Leaping Plum won his fourth Grasmick Handicap, as well as his fourth and final Coca-Cola Sprint Handicap victory.

In May, he won his second Tondi Budweiser Handicap.

=== 1999 ===
Leaping Plum won his fifth Grasmick Handicap, and finished second in the Coca-Cola Sprint Handicap.

=== 2000 ===
Leaping Plum won his sixth Grasmick Handicap.

=== 2001 ===
Leaping Plum won his seventh consecutive Grasmick Handicap.

=== 2002 ===
Leaping Plum would finish third in the Grasmick Handicap, marking his first loss in the race in his career.

=== 2003 ===
Leaping Plum won his eighth and final Grasmick Handicap at 12 years old. He was the fourth horse to win a stakes race at 12 years old.

=== 2004 ===
Leaping Plum made his final career start in the Grasmick Handicap, where he would finish fourth before retiring.

=== Record ===
Date	Track	Race	Finish
2 year old
11/10/1993	Thistledown	Maiden Special Weight	1st
3 year old
2/18/1994	Fonner Park	Allowance	7th
3/4/1994	Fonner Park	Allowance	2nd
4/28/1994	Fonner Park	Allowance	1st
5/6/1994	Ak-sar-ben	Allowance	5th
5/21/1994	Ak-sar-ben	Allowance	11th
6/4/1994	Ak-sar-ben	Allowance	9th
7/9/1994	Ak-sar-ben	Allowance	1st
8/19/1994	Thistledown	Allowance	3rd
9/10/1994	Thistledown	Allowance	2nd
9/24/1994	Thistledown	Allowance	1st
10/3/1994	Thistledown	Allowance	3rd
11/4/1994	Thistledown	Allowance	3rd
4 year old
2/18/1995	Fonner Park	Grasmick Handicap	1st
4/1/1995	Fonner Park	Coca-Cola Sprint Handicap (Black Type)	1st
4/30/1995	Fonner Park	Tondi Budweiser Handicap (Black Type)	1st
5/13/1995	Ak-sar-ben	Beef State Stakes (Black Type)	6th
9/17/1995	Lincoln Race Course	Speed Handicap	1st
10/7/1995	Hawthorne	Allowance	3rd
10/21/1995	Hawthorne	Allowance	4th
11/9/1995	Hawthorne	Allowance	4th
5 year old
2/17/1996	Fonner Park	Grasmick Handicap	1st
3/2/1996	Fonner Park	Grand Island Eagles Handicap	1st
3/30/1996	Fonner Park	Coca-Cola Sprint Handicap (Black Type)	1st
4/21/1996	Fonner Park	Tondi Budweiser Handicap (Black Type)	6th
6/23/1996	Thistledown	Handicap	1st
7/20/1996	Prairie Meadows	Heartland Sprint Stakes (Listed)	6th
9/21/1996	The Woodlands	Atchison, Topeka and Santa Fe Handicap (Black Type)	1st
6 year old
2/15/1997	Fonner Park	Grasmick Handicap	1st
3/22/1997	Fonner Park	Coca-Cola Sprint Handicap (Black Type)	1st
4/13/1997	Fonner Park	Dreisbach's Dowd Mile Handicap (Black Type)	4th
5/3/1997	Prairie Meadows	Prairie Express Stakes (Black Type)	5th
5/26/1997	Prairie Meadows	Bob Feller Stakes (Black Type)	3rd
6/18/1997	Prairie Meadows	Allowance	1st
7/5/1997	Prairie Meadows	Heartland Sprint Handicap (Listed)	3rd
8/5/1997	Prairie Meadows	Allowance	1st
7 year old
2/14/1998	Fonner Park	Grasmick Handicap	1st
3/28/1998	Fonner Park	Coca-Cola Sprint Handicap (Black Type)	1st
5/3/1998	Fonner Park	Tondi Budweiser Handicap (Black Type)	1st
5/30/1998	Prairie Meadows	Bob Feller Stakes (Listed)	3rd
6/23/1998	Prairie Meadows	Allowance	3rd
7/19/1998	Thistledown	Handicap	4th
8/10/1998	Thistledown	Allowance	2nd
8 year old
2/13/1999	Fonner Park	Grasmick Handicap	1st
2/21/1999	Fonner Park	Allowance	1st
3/27/1999	Fonner Park	Coca-Cola Sprint Handicap (Black Type)	2nd
9 year old
2/12/2000	Fonner Park	Grasmick Handicap	1st
3/18/2000	Fonner Park	Allowance	1st
4/1/2000	Fonner Park	Coca-Cola Sprint Handicap (Black Type)	3rd
4/24/2000	Prairie Meadows	Allowance	6th
5/7/2000	Fonner Park	Tondi Budweiser Handicap (Black Type)	2nd
9/24/2000	Beulah Park	Allowance	1st
11/7/2000	Mountaineer	Allowance	3rd
10 year old
2/17/2001	Fonner Park	Grasmick Handicap	1st
3/31/2001	Fonner Park	Coca-Cola Sprint Handicap (Black Type)	2nd
5/6/2001	Fonner Park	Tondi Budweiser Handicap (Black Type)	2nd
8/25/2001	Prairie Meadows	Allowance	6th
10/13/2001	Beulah Park	Allowance	1st
12/15/2001	Beulah Park	Samuel Handicap (Black Type)	5th
11 year old
2/16/2002	Fonner Park	Grasmick Handicap	3rd
3/10/2002	Fonner Park	Allowance	1st
3/23/2002	Fonner Park	Pepsi Sprint Handicap (Black Type)	2nd
12 year old
2/22/2003	Fonner Park	Grasmick Handicap	1st
3/29/2003	Fonner Park	Tondi Budweiser Handicap	3rd
5/17/2003	Lincoln Race Course	Speed Handicap	2nd
13 year old
2/21/2004	Fonner Park	Grasmick Handicap	4th

== Death ==
On July 16, 2017, Leaping Plum died in his sleep at a pasture in Grand Island, Nebraska.

== Pedigree ==
Pedigree of Leaping Plum (1991–2017)
Sire Lightning Leap b.1982	Nijinsky II b.1967	Northern Dancer	Nearctic
Sire Lightning Leap b.1982	Nijinsky II b.1967	Northern Dancer	Natalma
Sire Lightning Leap b.1982	Nijinsky II b.1967	Flaming Rage	Bull Page
Sire Lightning Leap b.1982	Nijinsky II b.1967	Flaming Rage	Flaring Top
Sire Lightning Leap b.1982	First Feather b.1963	First Landing	Turn-To
Sire Lightning Leap b.1982	First Feather b.1963	First Landing	Hildene
Sire Lightning Leap b.1982	First Feather b.1963	Quill	Princequillo
Sire Lightning Leap b.1982	First Feather b.1963	Quill	Quick Touch
Dam Velvet Plum b.1984	Dr. Blum b.1977	Dr. Fager	Rough'n Tumble
Dam Velvet Plum b.1984	Dr. Blum b.1977	Dr. Fager	Aspidistra
Dam Velvet Plum b.1984	Dr. Blum b.1977	Due Dilly	Sir Gaylord
Dam Velvet Plum b.1984	Dr. Blum b.1977	Due Dilly	Bold Matron
Dam Velvet Plum b.1984	Velvet Flight b.1972	Stevward	Nashua
Dam Velvet Plum b.1984	Velvet Flight b.1972	Stevward	Sherry Jen
Dam Velvet Plum b.1984	Velvet Flight b.1972	Dark Duet	Spy Song
Dam Velvet Plum b.1984	Velvet Flight b.1972	Dark Duet	Dark Vintage
