= Knights of Ak-Sar-Ben =

Philanthropic organization based in Omaha, Nebraska

The Knights of Ak-Sar-Ben Foundation is a 501(c)(3) civic and philanthropic organization in Omaha, Nebraska.

== History ==
The Knights of Ak-Sar-Ben was established in 1895 by the Omaha Commercial Club, the predecessor to the Greater Omaha Chamber of Commerce. The Commercial Club sought to demonstrate Omaha's economic viability in the face of the depression following the Panic of 1893. There were also concerns that the city might lose its five-year contract to host the annual state fair after complaints about its management of the 1894 fair. During that time, business leaders in Omaha and other Midwestern metropolises at the time utilized fairs and festivals to boost their cities' images and to compete with each other and East Coast cities for investment and residents. To keep the state fair in Omaha, the Commercial Club provided financial support for an adequate transportation system and for improved buildings for the 1895 state fair. It also organized a new festival in the style of Mardi Gras in New Orleans, which had similarly inspired the Veiled Prophet celebration in St. Louis

The name "Knights of Ak-Sar-Ben" is believed to have been created during an 1895 trip of Commercial Club leadership to buy parade floats and costumes from New Orleans Mardi Gras krewes. During a train discussion, one Club leader suggested, "Why not reverse the name of our beloved state, since everything seems to be going backwards these days? Nebraska hyphenated and spelled backwards is Ak-Sar-Ben." Another on the trip proposed modifying the name to "Knights of Ak-Sar-Ben," since they felt the businessmen had heroically saved the fair for the city. A Catholic priest who overheard the group shared his interpretation of the meaning of Ak-Sar-Ben based on his translations of the syllables into Syrian, Arabic, and Hebrew, respectively. He believed it stood for "the King, his Domain, and his Retainers." The priest and the Club leaders then decided to call the "domain" over which the organization would "rule" the Kingdom of Quivira. This name was inspired by a mythical city of gold that Spanish conquistadors had searched for in the Great Plains during the 16th century. They mistakenly believed that this fabled city was located in Nebraska.

== Initiatives ==
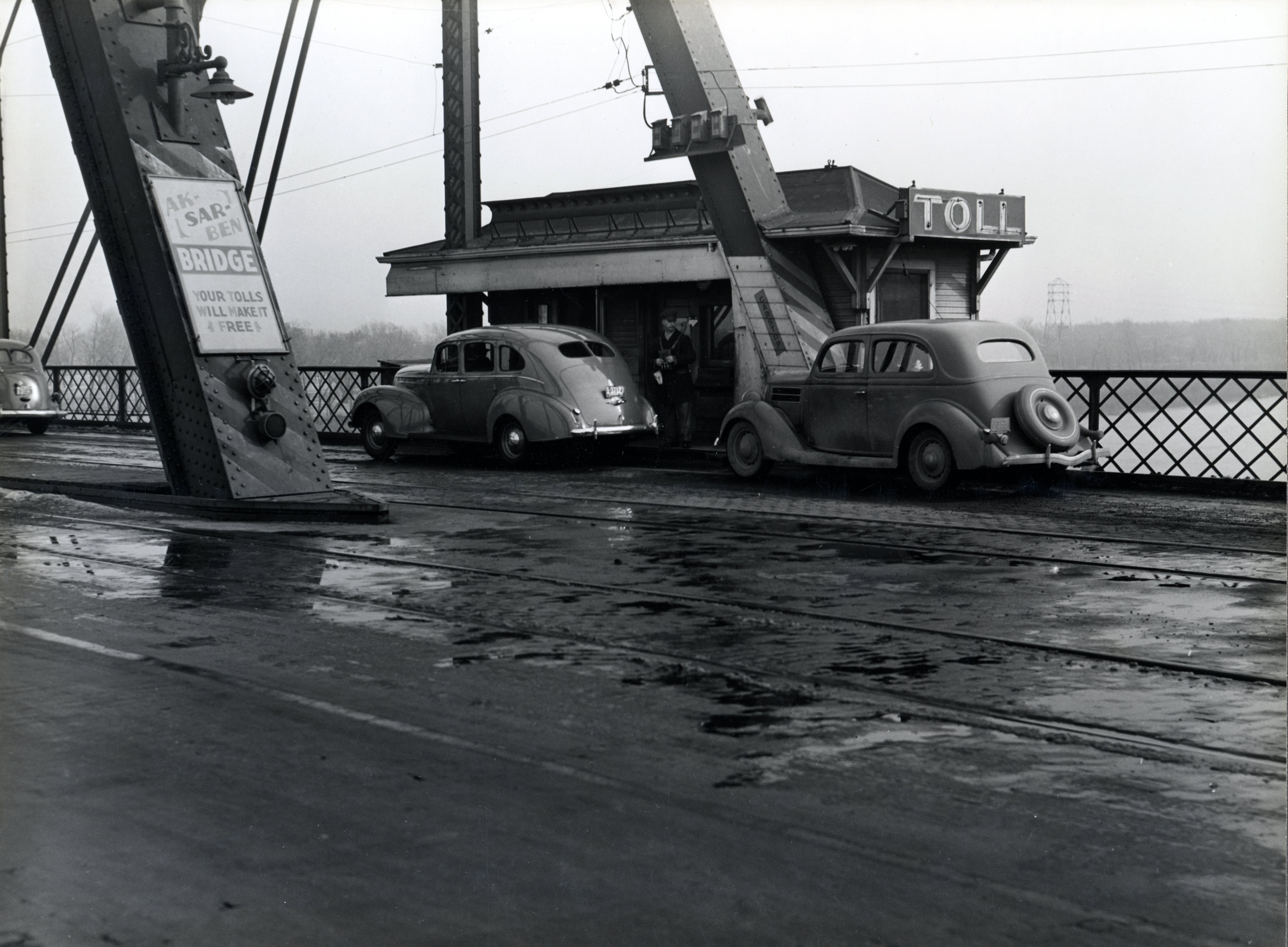
Ak-sar-ben Toll Bridge between Iowa and Nebraska in November 1938

While the initial purpose of the organization was to keep the Nebraska State Fair in Omaha, it was eventually moved to Lincoln and subsequently to Grand Island.

The group has pursued other initiatives, such as purchasing the Douglas Street Bridge, the first road bridge across the Missouri River. Their goal was to remove the tolls on the bridge, which was subsequently renamed the Ak-Sar-Ben Bridge. From the 1920s through the 1990s, the Knights built and operated a horse racing track and arena complex, also named Ak-Sar-Ben. In 1992 the Knights donated the horse racing track and arena complex to a new legal entity – the Ak-Sar-Ben Future Trust. This organization is developing the property for multi-purpose under the name Aksarben Village.

The Knights of AKSARBEN Foundation continues to serve its 112-year-old mission of "building a more prosperous heartland where communities can flourish and every child can succeed." The organization supports financial need-based scholarship programs and administers Nebraska's Pioneer Farm program, Good Neighbor Awards, and Ike Friedman Leadership Awards. It also produces the AKSARBEN Stockshow & Rodeo and the Ak-Sar-Ben Coronation Ball.

The AKSARBEN Stockshow & Rodeo was established in 1927. Its mission is to produce an annual youth livestock show that celebrates the region’s agricultural heritage and educates and benefits families.

AKSARBEN Rodeo is an annual festival of the region's heritage. Its three core events include the Douglas County Fair, The Ak-Sar-Ben 4-H Livestock Exposition, and the Ak-Sar-Ben Rodeo, host of the Wrangler ProRodeo Tour – Omaha Round.

AKSARBEN's Coronation Ball is a celebration of volunteerism and civic pride. It is a fund-raising event that supports need-based scholarship programs and recognizes the volunteer efforts of individuals throughout the region through the honoring of families.

In 2005, the Omaha Ak-Sar-Ben Knights of the American Hockey League were named after the Knights of Ak-Sar-Ben Foundation, who had a minority ownership stake in the team. However, after two seasons of mediocre attendance, the franchise was relocated in 2007 to the Quad Cities. It is currently located in Calgary, Alberta.

== See also ==
- Gambling in Omaha, Nebraska
- History of Omaha
- The Ancient Order of A-kep-ot Ster-boo
