= The Ancient Order of A-kep-ot Ster-boo =

Organization in Topeka, Kansas

The Ancient Order of A-kep-ot Ster-boo was an organization formed June 3, 1916 in Topeka, Kansas. The organization's headquarters were located in the Hamilton Building at Sixth and Quincy Streets.

Modeled after the Knights of Ak-Sar-Ben from Omaha, Nebraska, which took its name from spelling “Nebraska” backwards, the organization based its name on the phrase “Topeka Booster” and was "...entertaining the Democratic population of Topeka and delegates to conventions in this city with the mystic degree work." Its ritual told the story of an Assyrian pirate crew marooned on a south sea island and contained a total of three degrees.

The first initiation was held on June 7, 1916, during Merchants' Week in Topeka. Membership was open to any interested person and anyone attending an initiation were required to become members of the organization. Initiations typically began with a parade containing current members and new initiates, who were frequently "captured" and taken to their initiations in a cage which was included in the parade.

The officers of the organization consisted of Imperial Petoka; Chief Petoka; Assistant Chief Petoka; Scribe; Kepota; Second Petoka; Third Petoka; Guardian and Mysterious A-kep-ot. The Imperial Petoka, Chief Petoka and Assistant Chief Petoka also had assistants.

The organization also consisted of a membership committee and music committee.
