= 6th National Eucharistic Congress (United States) =

1930 Catholic event in Omaha

Sixth National Eucharistic Congress
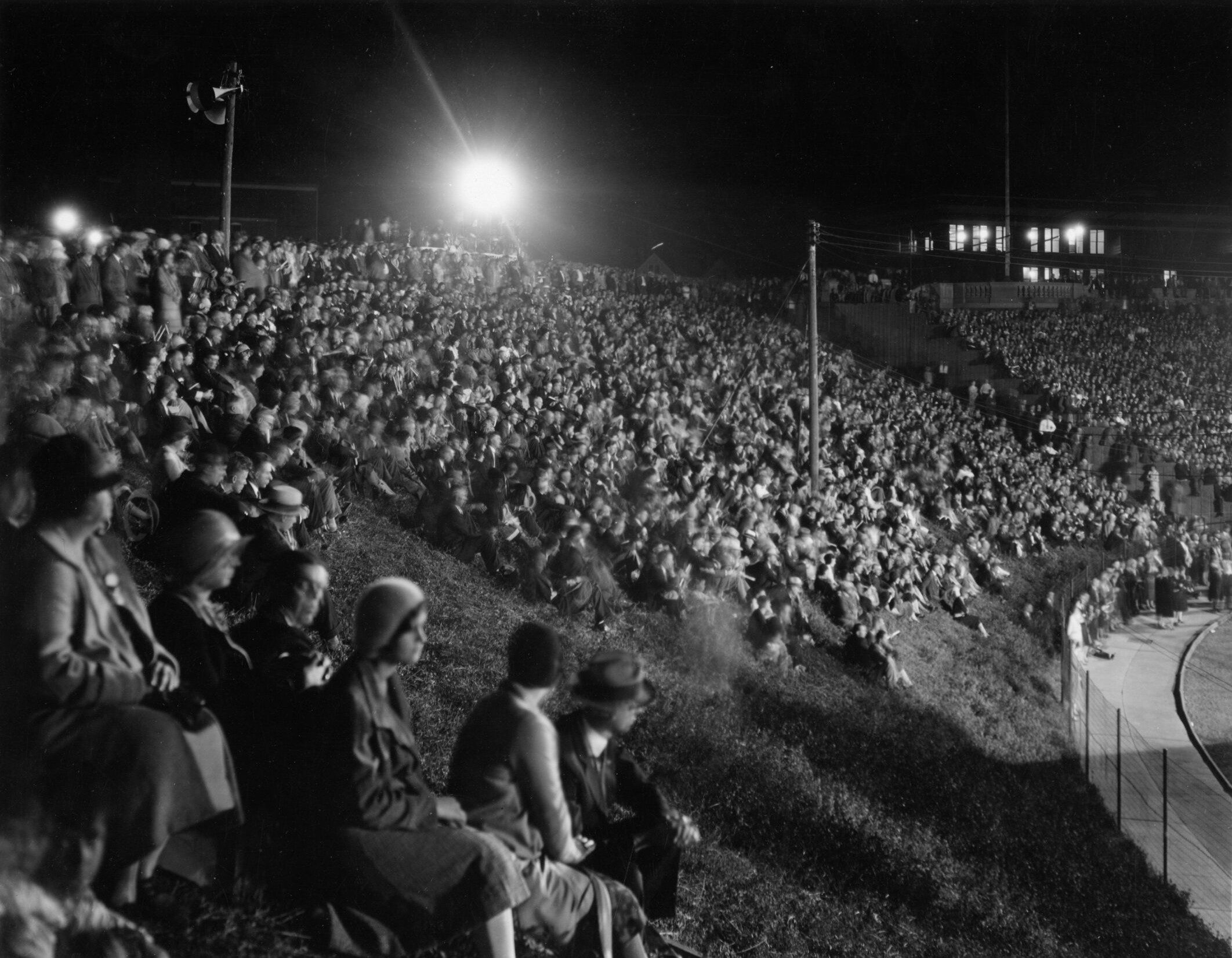
- Pilgrims sitting on the grass at Creighton Stadium
- Date: September 23–25, 1930
- Duration: 3 days
- Venue: Ak-Sar-Ben Coliseum; Creighton Stadium; St. Cecilia Cathedral
- Location: Omaha, Nebraska
- Type: Eucharistic congress
- Theme: The Blessed Eucharist, by Divine Institution, the Source and Center of Christian Life
- Patron: Cardinal George Mundelein
- Organized by: Bishop Joseph Rummel; Priests' Eucharistic League
- Participants: 75,000
- Papal envoy: Archbishop Pietro Fumasoni Biondi

The Sixth National Eucharistic Congress was a Catholic gathering in Omaha, Nebraska, from September 23 to 25, 1930. Hosted by Bishop Joseph Rummel of Omaha, the gathering was the second-largest convention ever held in the city. Events were held at Ak-Sar-Ben Coliseum, Creighton Stadium, and St. Cecilia Cathedral.

== Background ==
The congress was born out of the Priests' Eucharistic League in the United States, who planned to hold their 1930 national convention in Omaha. However, after deliberation and hoping to capitalize on the success of the greatly successful 28th International Eucharistic Congress in Chicago, it was decided that the gathering should not just be a convention of league members but a full Eucharistic congress. The Omaha congress would be the first national Eucharistic congress in the United States since 1911. The Omaha congress would be the first to which the laity were invited; the previous five national congresses had been clergy-only gatherings.

One-third of the American episcopate and several thousand priests expressed their intention to attend.

== Preparation ==
The congress was hosted by Joseph Rummel under the patronage of Cardinal George Mundelein, and sponsored by the Priests' Eucharistic League. The theme "The Blessed Eucharist, by Divine Institution, the Source and Center of Christian Life" was given to the congress.

Twenty-five temporary altars were set up in St. Cecilia Cathedral, with several other parishes also setting up between 10 and 15 temporary altars for the celebration of Mass. Additional bleachers able to accommodate 36,000 people were erected at the 16,000 seat Creighton Stadium, bringing the total capacity to 52,000.

== Congress ==
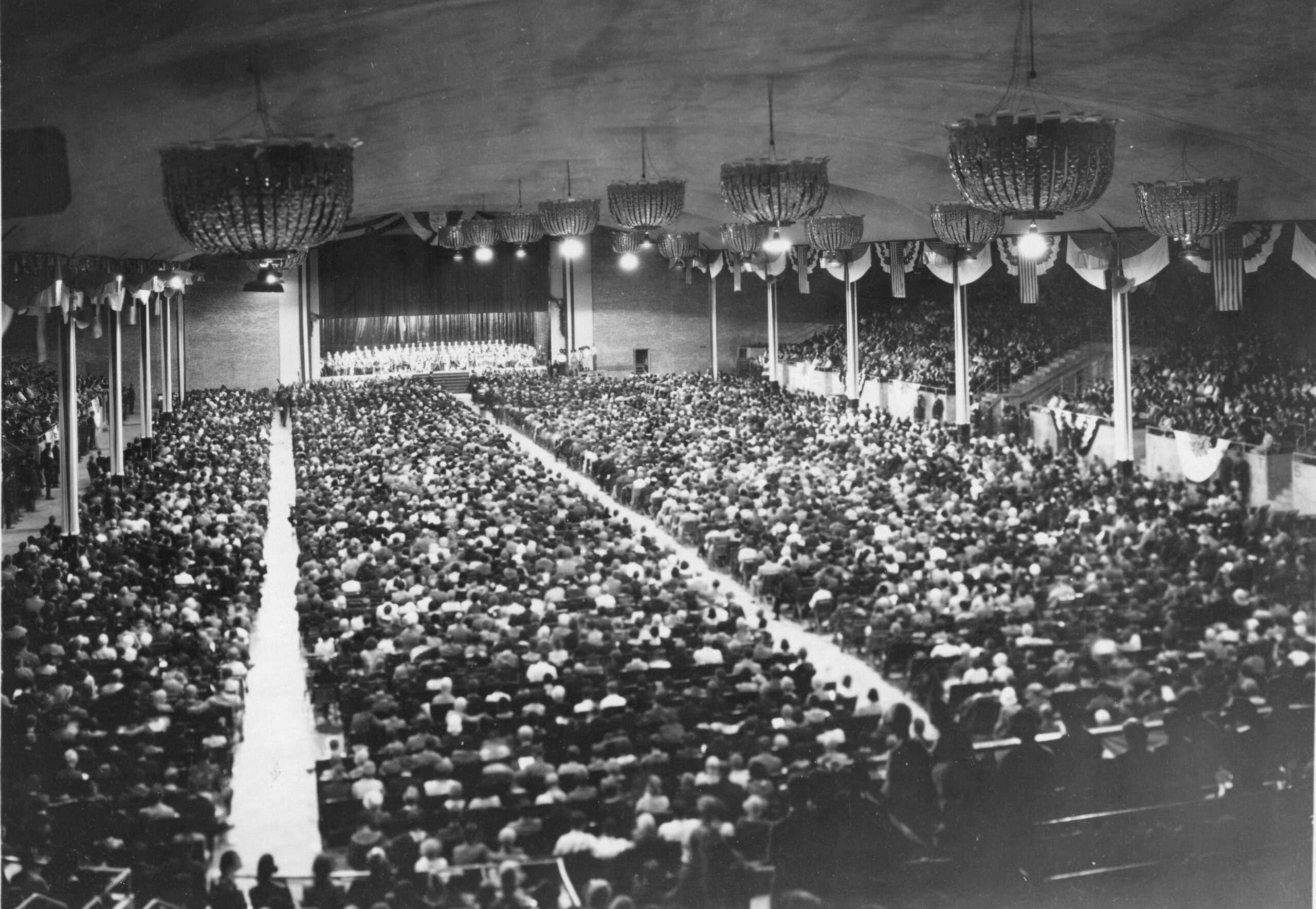
The civic reception at Ak-Sar-Ben Coliseum

=== September 22 ===
Prior to the formal start of the congress, a civil reception was held at the Ak-Sar-Ben Coliseum for visiting prelates and other dignitaries.

=== September 23 ===
The congress was formally opened on Tuesday, September 23 at 9:30 am with a Solemn Pontifical Votive Mass celebrated by Archbishop Pietro Fumasoni Biondi, apostolic delegate to the United States in St. Cecilia Cathedral. The Archbishop of Dubuque, Francis Beckman, preached on the need to "honor the Lord of the Tabernacle" and "offer Him the deepest worship of our souls." Pietro Fumasoni Biondi read a letter from Pope Pius XI sent to the congress, extolling Peter Julian Eymard's Eucharistic League and sending his apostolic blessing.

Several talks were held through the day for clergy at the Creighton auditorium. Around 1,500 women attended a tea gathering at 5 pm at the local Knights of Columbus club. A solemn holy hour for clergy was held in St. Cecilia Cathedral at 8 pm, with public holy hours held in all parishes in the city of Omaha presided at by various bishops. Beginning at 9 pm, the men's Nocturnal Adoration Society began adoration at St. Peter's Church and continued until the following day at 6 pm. A Solemn Pontifical Mass was offered at midnight by Bishop Joseph Rummel. More than one thousand men were present.

=== September 24 ===
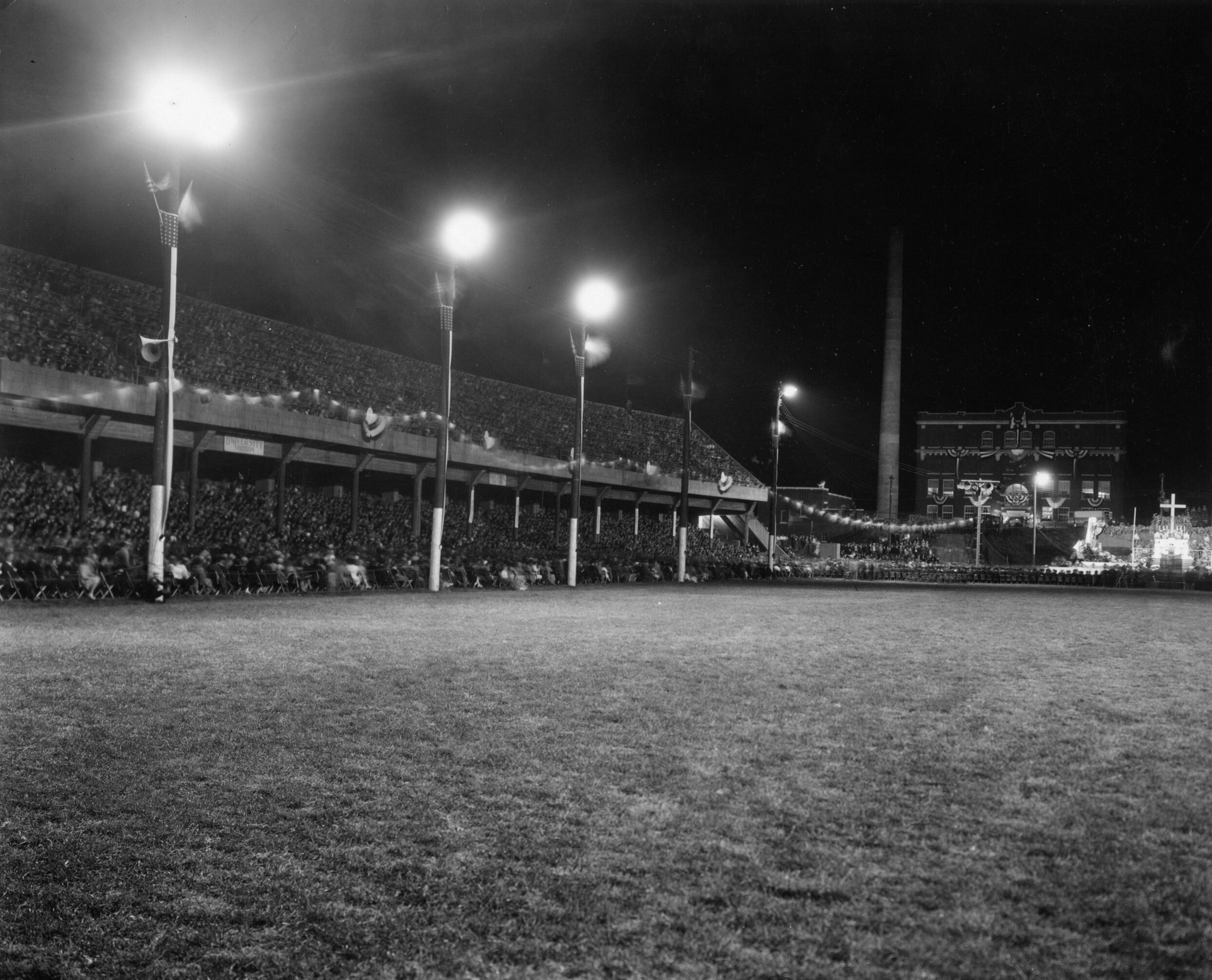
Creighton Stadium illuminated for evening activities

The ceremonies of Wednesday, September 24 were started by an 8 am Pontifical Low Mass offered for deceased members of the Priests' Eucharistic League at St. John's parish in Omaha. At 9 am, Bishop Patrick Aloysius Alphonsus McGovern of Cheyenne celebrated a Solemn Pontifical Mass for children and students in St. Cecilia Cathedral; Archbishop Edward Joseph Hanna of San Francisco gave the sermon. A choir consisting of 100 girls sang the Missa de Angelis.

In the evening, 40,000 people crowded into Creighton Stadium. A telegram from President Herbert Hoover was read, expressing his "cordial greetings" and "appreciation of the value of spiritual ideals and of religious observance in the life of our nation, which are indispensable foundations of the social order." Cardinal George Mundelein of Chicago spoke hopefully about resurgence in religious practice, citing the example and teaching of Pope Pius X. Speaking highly of the former pontiff, Mundelein told the story of the young future pope, Giuseppe Sarto, starting as a peasant boy and simple parish priest and that his closeness with the people gave him great vision of the spiritual. Judge Martin Thomas Manton of the United States district court of appeals of New York spoke on the value of religious diversity. The evening ended with benediction.

=== September 25 ===
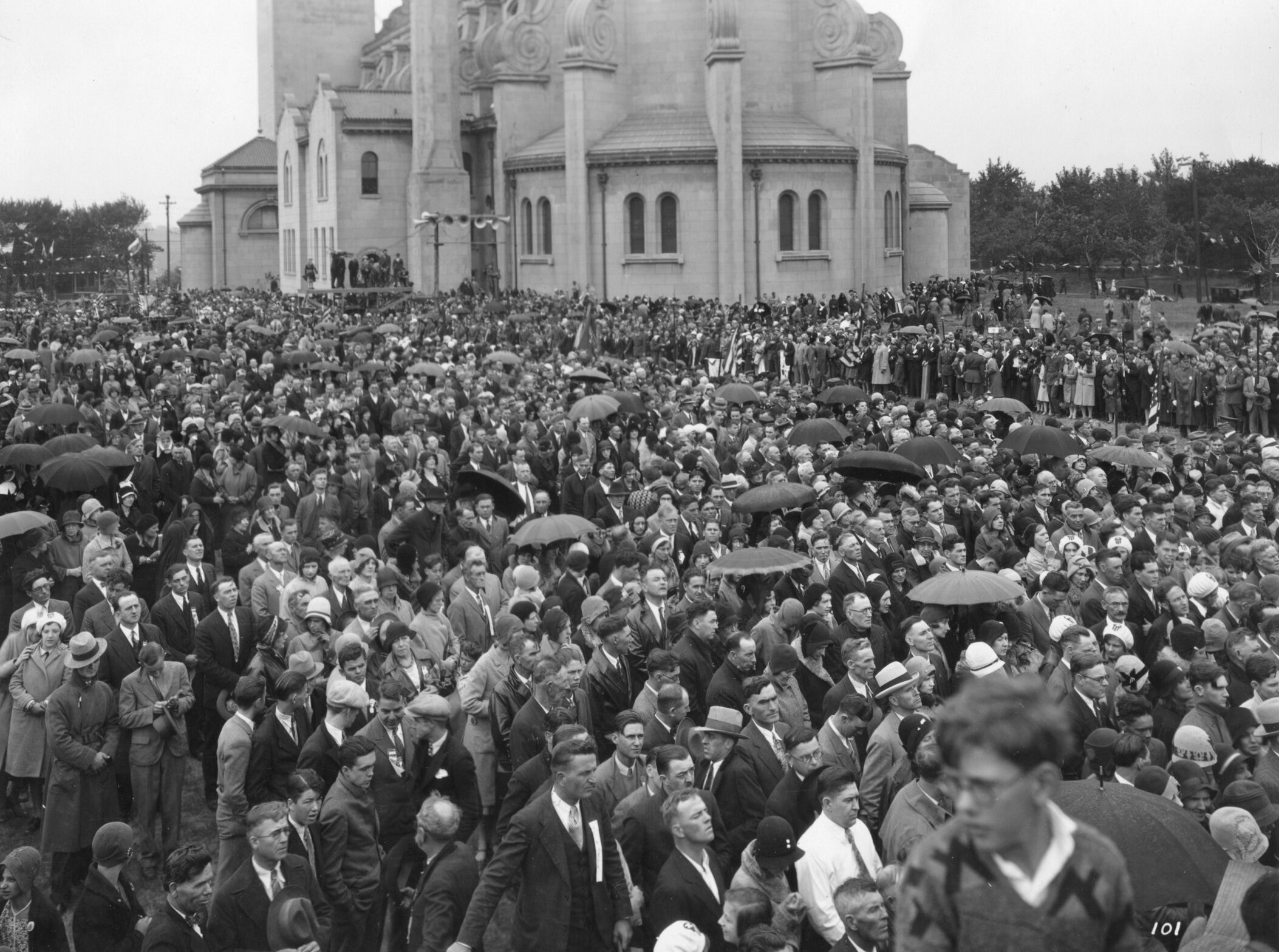
The closing procession outside of the cathedral

A fire broke out in the choir loft during the 9 am Solemn Pontifical Mass for women in St. Cecilia Cathedral, caused by defective wiring. The celebrant, auxiliary bishop of New York John Joseph Dunn, calmly continued with the Mass as members of the men's chorus and firefighters extinguished the inflamed bunting.

Despite rain and mist, 25,000 men, women, and children processed in the final procession in the afternoon. Members of the 17th Infantry Regiment escorted the procession. The procession stopped for benediction at several locations, including Joseph Rummel's episcopal residence and Duchesne College. The final ceremonies were held at the cathedral.

== Legacy ==
A commemorative mosaic of the coat of arms of the congress was placed in St. Cecilia Cathedral. At the time, the gathering was the second-largest gathering to have been held in the city of Omaha, surpassed only by the Trans-Mississippi and International Exposition in 1898.

Bishop Joseph Schrembs of Cleveland stated that twelve dioceses were clamoring to be the host of the next congress. Schrembs would become the Promoter of National Eucharistic Congresses, and himself would be the next host in 1935. Schrembs also stated that the plan was to hold national congresses every five years.
