= Nashua =

Nashua may refer to:

- Nashaway people, Native American tribe living in 17th-century New England

== Places ==
=== Australia ===
- Nashua, New South Wales, a town

=== United States ===
- Nashua, Iowa, a city
- Nashua, Minnesota, a city
- Nashua, Kansas City, a neighborhood of Kansas City, Missouri
- Nashua, Montana, a town
- Nashua, New Hampshire, a city, and the largest city with this name
  - The Nashua River in New Hampshire and Massachusetts

== Other uses ==
- The Nashua Corporation, American company based in Nashua, New Hampshire
- Nashua (horse), Thoroughbred racehorse and 1955 Horse of the Year
- Nashua Dolphins, South African cricket team
- Nashua (YTB-774), United States Navy harbor tug

== See also ==
- Nashua High School (disambiguation)
- Nasua
- Nassau (disambiguation)
