= Fonner Park =

Thoroughbred horse racing facility in Grand Island, Nebraska, US

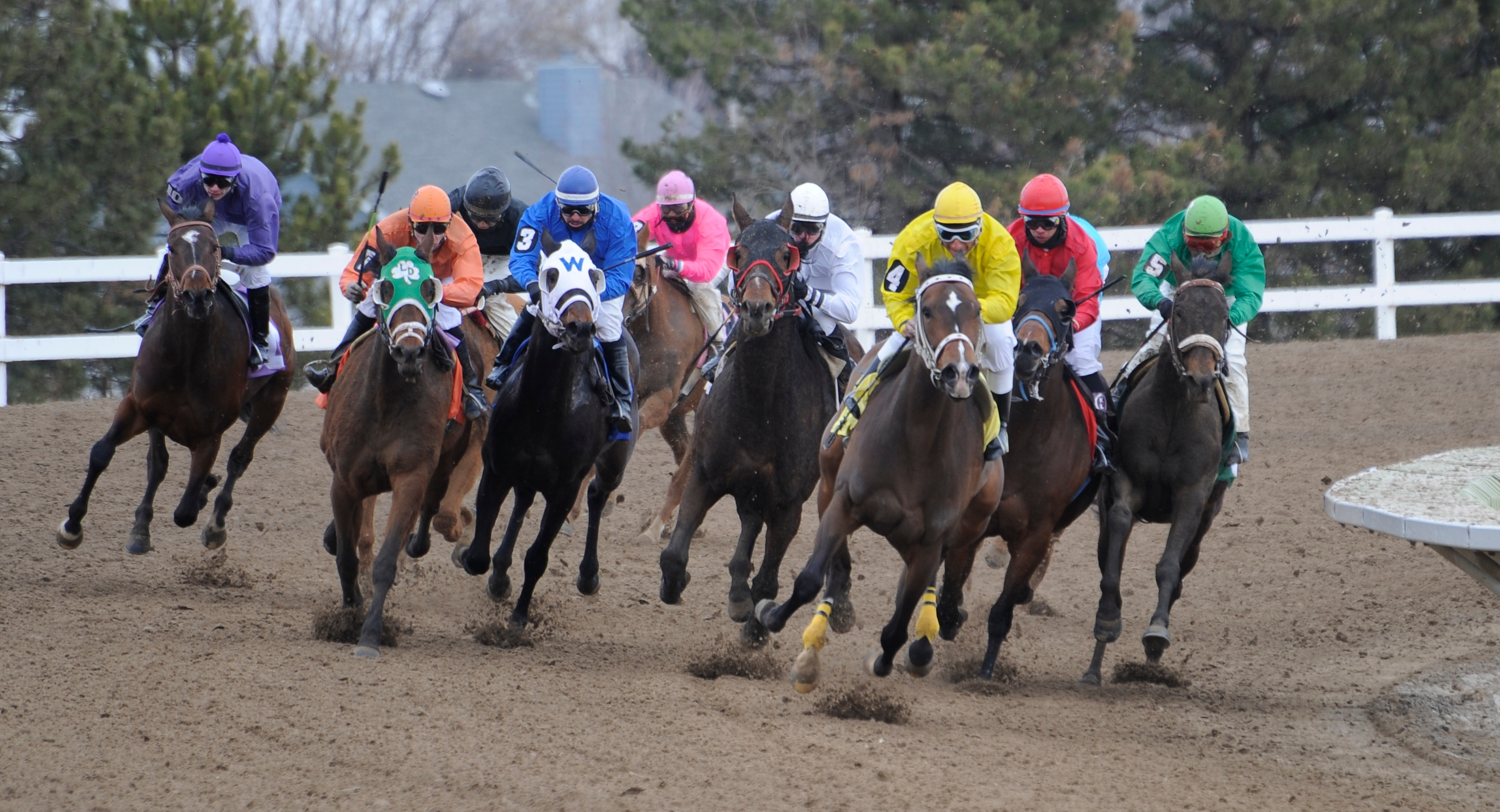
- 2013 horse race at Fonner Park
- Interactive map of Fonner Park
- Location: Grand Island, Nebraska
- Coordinates: 40°54′20″N 98°19′43″W
- Owned by: Hall County Livestock Improvement Association
- Date opened: April 29, 1954
- Race type: Thoroughbred
- Course type: Dirt

Fonner Park is a thoroughbred horse racing facility located in Grand Island, Nebraska. Co-located with the Hall County Fair and Nebraska State Fair, it is named after its original landowner August L. Fonner and first held races in 1954.

== Physical attributes ==
Fonner Park is a 5/8-mile (1,000 m; 5.0-furlong) dirt oval. The Fonner Keno Casino and Finish Line Restaurant offers keno and off-track betting. In July 2019, the facility received authorization from the Nebraska Racing Commission to install historical Instant Racing machines, but in February 2020 their installation was delayed due to a pending lawsuit over their legality.

== History ==
The site was purchased by the Hall County Livestock Improvement Association in April 1953. The park was named after August L. "Gus" Fonner, who donated the land. The Old Reliable Hereford Show and Sale was held as its first livestock exhibition in September, before beginning its inaugural season of racing on April 29, 1954. In the years that followed, Fonner was expanded to include additional grandstand seating, expanded barn space, an indoor quarter-mile training track, and other amenities.

In March 1979, Fonner Park began offering Sunday races for the first time. In 1988, the track began simulcasts to Lincoln and Omaha.

Fonner Park escaped the June 1980 tornado outbreak with relatively little damage as Tornado 5 wrapped around the Fonner Park grounds in a semicircle path. The original Gus Fonner O.K. Farm Store next to the Fonner Park campus was completely destroyed.

The Heartland Events Center, located on the Fonner Park campus, opened in 2006. In an agreement with the City of Grand Island, the approximately 6,000 seat arena was owned and managed by Fonner Park from its opening until December 2024. Ownership transferred to the City of Grand Island in 2024, and management of the venue was transferred to VenuWorks.

In 2010, the Fonner Park campus became home to the Nebraska State Fair.

In 2015, the Grand Island Livestock Complex Authority (GILCA) was founded in conjunction with Fonner Park, the Nebraska State Fair, the Hall County Convention and Visitors Bureau, and the Grand Island Chamber of Commerce. The mission of the 501c(3) nonprofit was to attract national livestock shows to the Fonner Park campus.

=== Prominence during the COVID-19 pandemic ===
On March 16, 2020, live racing at Fonner Park was suspended due to health and safety concerns related to the COVID-19 pandemic. On March 19, the facility announced that it planned to resume races behind closed doors as a "trial" from March 23 through April 1, with races moving from weekends to a Monday–Wednesday schedule, only essential personnel present at the track, and additional safety protocols. While grandstands would be closed to the public, spectators would still be able to watch from the track's parking lot and use its geofenced betting app while on the grounds. The Fonner Keno Casino and restaurant would remain operational, subject to restrictions.

As one of the few U.S. tracks to continue racing (and horse racing being one of the few sports to continue in any form amidst the pandemic's arrival in North America), the "boutique" Fonner Park began to receive national exposure, including more frequent simulcasts by TVG Network. The change in scheduling and shift to late-afternoon first posts helped alleviate conflicts with weekend simulcast racing from other tracks still in operation, and helped attract more viewers from the west coast.

With the resumption of races, Fonner Park experienced a surge in off-track betting activity domestically and abroad; on its first day of races after the resumption, the track handled over $1.3 million—surpassing the track's previous single-day record of $1.2 million. Fonner Park CEO Chris Kotulak noted that the track only received 3% of the revenue from OTB, meaning that higher numbers would be needed to cover purses and employee salaries. In its first two weeks, the average handle increased to $2.1 million per day. Fonner Park simulcasts were also being picked up in countries such as Australia, England, France, and South Africa, while the Grand Island Independent described the track as having temporarily become "the center of the horse racing world".

On April 1, it was announced that Fonner Park would continue this racing format through April. Kotulak stated that it "exceeded our expectations because we did not expect as many other tracks to cancel racing". By its sixth week, the average daily handle had peaked at $3.5 million, but to taper off towards $3 million as other tracks resumed racing. From February through April, Fonner Park took a total of $71.3 million in wagers, a year-over-year increase of $63.8 million. It also accounted for 40% of wagers from TVG customers in April 2020 (as opposed to only 5% the year before).

On April 22, the Nebraska Racing Commission approved the addition of 12 additional days of racing in May, extending Fonner Park's season through May 27.

=== 2023-present ===
In February 2023, Fonner Park announced that it would discontinue simulcasting its races to the 49 states outside of Nebraska until further notice, citing objections and "insurmountable" complications brought upon by the Horseracing Integrity and Safety Authority (HISA)—an entity established under the Horseracing Integrity and Safety Act of 2020 to create and enforce unified safety and drug testing policies for thoroughbred racing. Under the Act, tracks fall under its jurisdiction if they engage in interstate wagering. Fonner Park and the state of Nebraska are parties to a legal challenge to the HISA's authority. Fonner Park continues to simulcast its races within Nebraska and outside of the United States.

On March 9, 2023, trainer Todd Scherer was murdered in a barn at Fonner Park; in May 2024, the lead suspect—Logan Hunts Horse—was convicted of second-degree murder, and plead no contest on a charge of felony use of a deadly weapon. Four other charges were dropped in a plea bargain.

On April 10, 2025, the Grand Island Casino Resort opened at the Fonner Park campus. The casino cost $185 million and is operated by Elite Casino Resorts based in Iowa.

== Horse racing ==
Fonner Park exclusively hosts Thoroughbred racing. By state law, Fonner Park along with all other racetracks in Nebraska must run at least one race dedicated exclusively to Nebraska-breds on each race day. After the closure of Ak-Sar-Ben in Omaha in August 1995, Fonner Park became the flagship racetrack in Nebraska.

Since 2010, Fonner Park has run 31 race days each year except during 2020, 2022, and 2023. Additional race days were run in those years due to other Nebraska racetracks being unavailable to host racing because of Covid or casino construction at those racetracks. Prior to 2010, Fonner Park ran between 13 race days in 1954 and 44 race days from 1988 to 1996.

The feature race at Fonner Park each race meet is the Bosselman Pump & Pantry / Gus Fonner Stakes which currently has a purse of $75,000 and a distance of one and one-sixteenth miles. Prior to 1990, the race was known as the Gus Fonner Handicap. The inaugural race was run in 1960 and was won by Lotafun, ridden by Kenneth Hare and owned and trained by Wallace Strong. The 2025 winner was Komorebino Omeide.

== See also ==
- Impact of the COVID-19 pandemic on sports
