= Creighton Stadium =

Demolished stadium in Omaha, Nebraska

Coordinates: 41.2664°N 95.9506°W

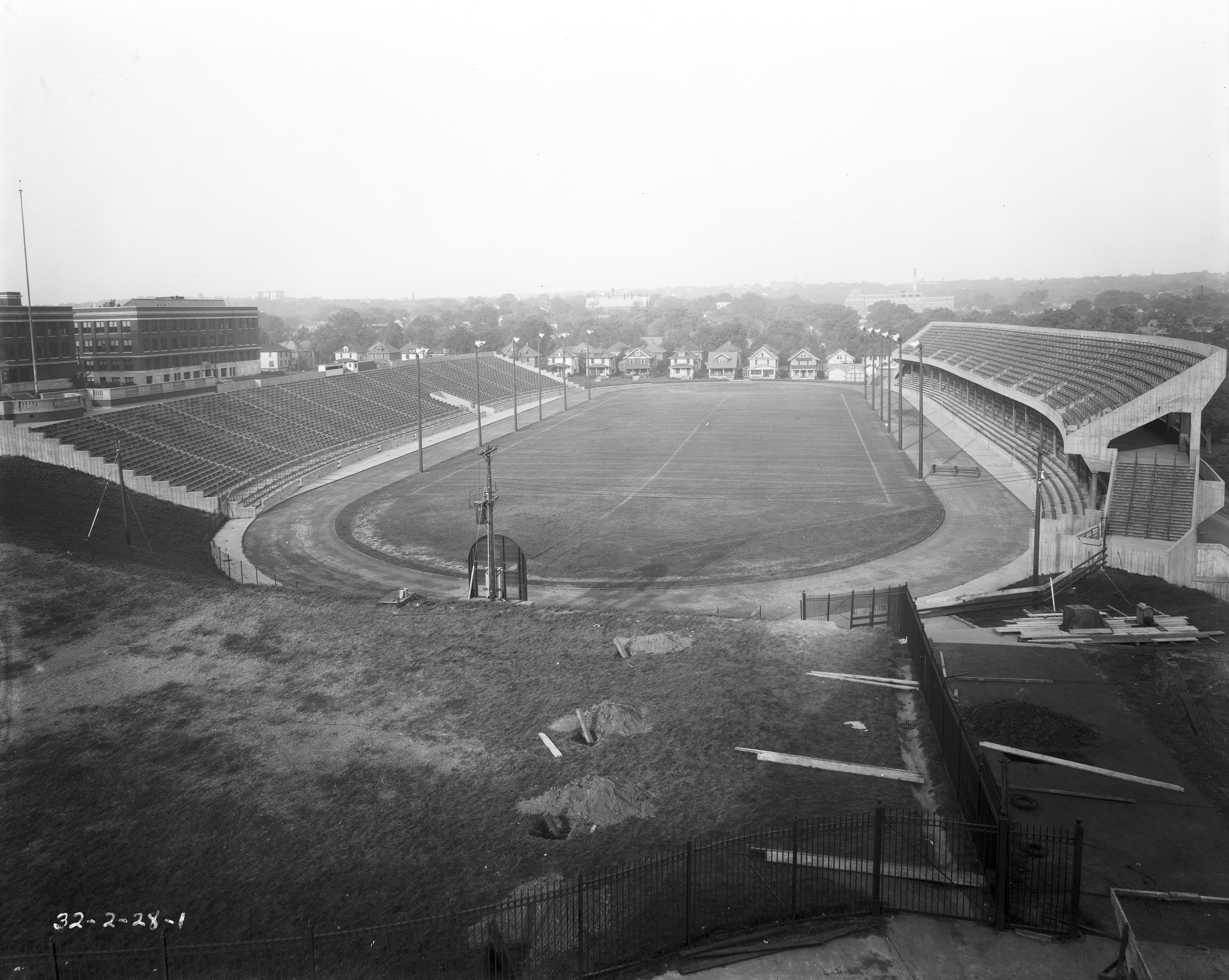
- Creighton Stadium in 1925
- Interactive map of Creighton Stadium
- Address: N. 27th & Burt Streets
- Location: Creighton University; Omaha, Nebraska, U.S.
- Owner: Creighton University
- Operator: Creighton University
- Capacity: 22,500
- Surface: Natural grass

Construction
- Groundbreaking: 1924
- Opened: 1925; 101 years ago
- Closed: 1963
- Demolished: 1966
- Cost: $335,000

Tenant
- Creighton Bluejays (NCAA) (1925–1942)

Creighton Stadium was an outdoor American football stadium in the midwestern United States, located on the campus of Creighton University in Omaha, Nebraska. At the southeast corner of North 27th and Burt streets, it was the home field of the Creighton Bluejays of the Missouri Valley Conference.

Constructed in 1924, and opened 101 years ago in 1925, it was a concrete stadium in the shape of an oval, but lacked enclosed end zones. Asymmetric, the larger grandstand on the south sideline was single level and included the press box, while the north grandstand had a second deck, bounded by Burt Street. After several seasons, lights were added, between the field and the running track.

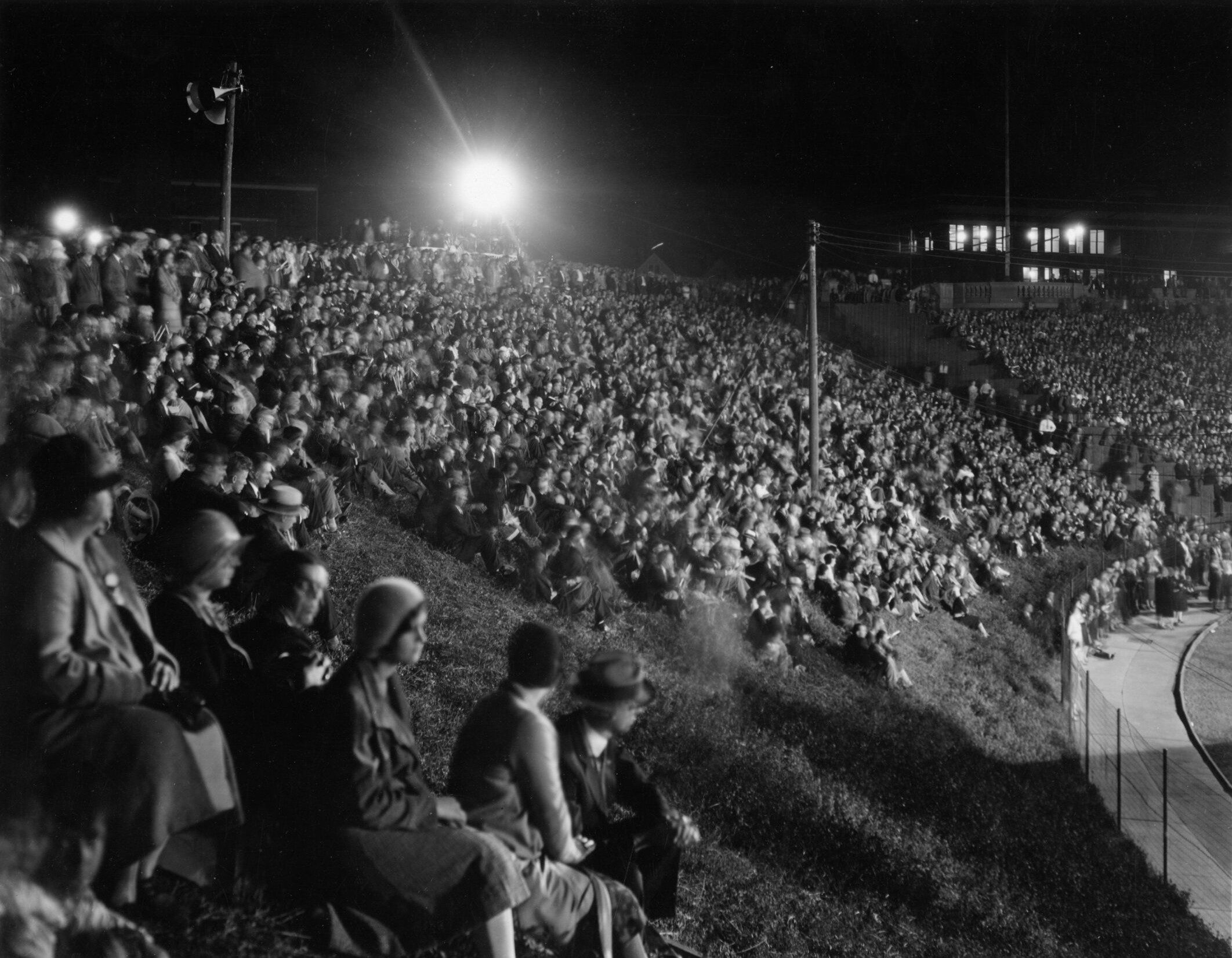
Pilgrims sitting on the grass in outside the stadium endzones during the Sixth National Eucharistic Congress

The football field had an unconventional east-west alignment at an elevation of approximately 1,050 feet (320 m) above sea level. Located at the northwest corner of campus, the present-day North Freeway (U.S. Route 75) is immediately west of the site.

Like many colleges during World War II, Creighton put its football program on hiatus after the 1942 season; the final varsity game was at home against Tulsa on November 21. Bluejay football was not resumed after the war, but the stadium was used for track competitions and ROTC drilling for the next two decades. It was demolished in the 1960s and the site where it stood is now occupied by the Criss research buildings of the Creighton University School of Medicine.

In addition to college athletics, the stadium hosted religious and community affairs, as well as rodeos. The Sixth National Eucharistic Congress was hosted in part at the stadium in 1930.

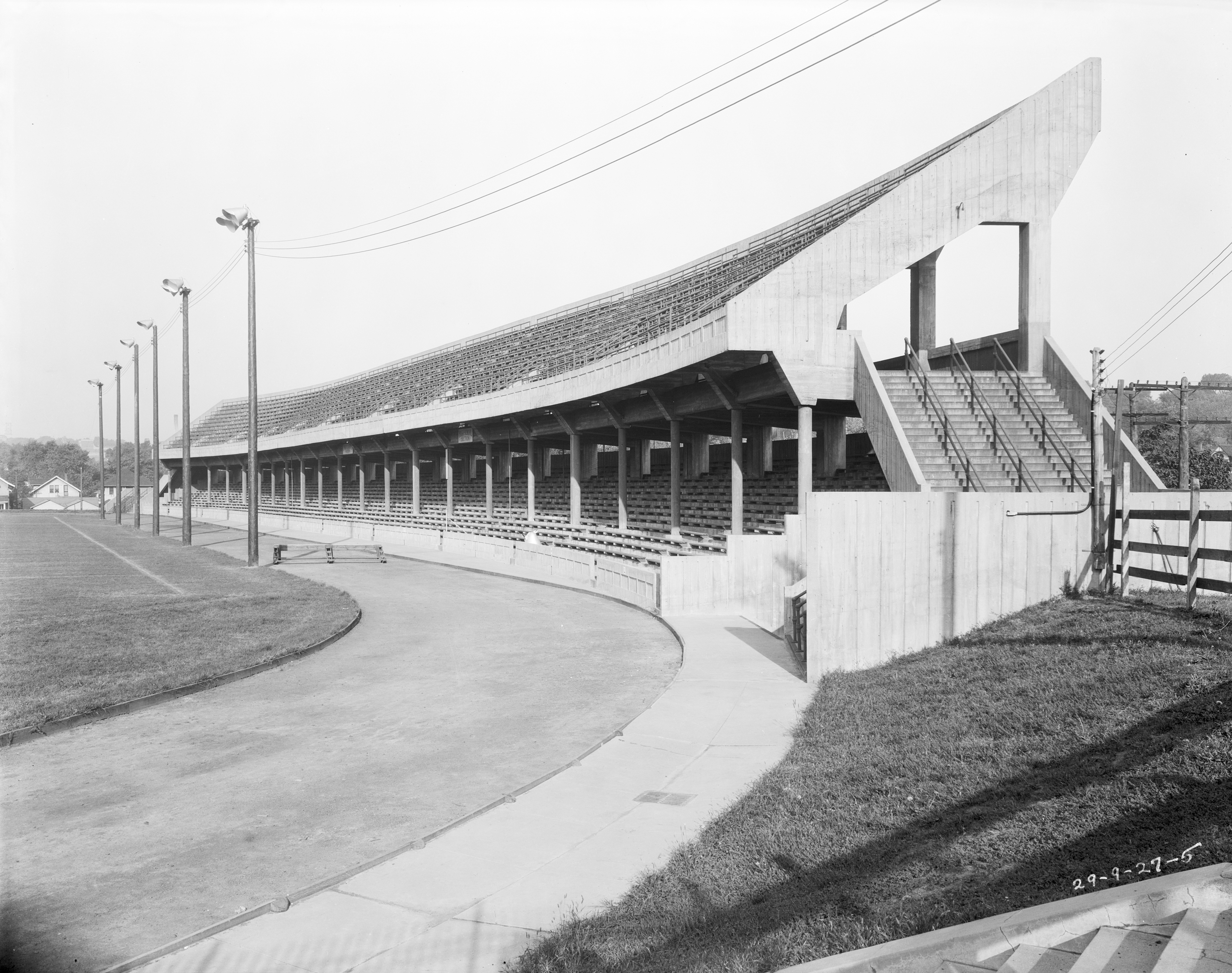
The stands of the stadium in 1925
