= Guy C. Barton House =

- Formerly listed on the U.S. National Register of Historic Places
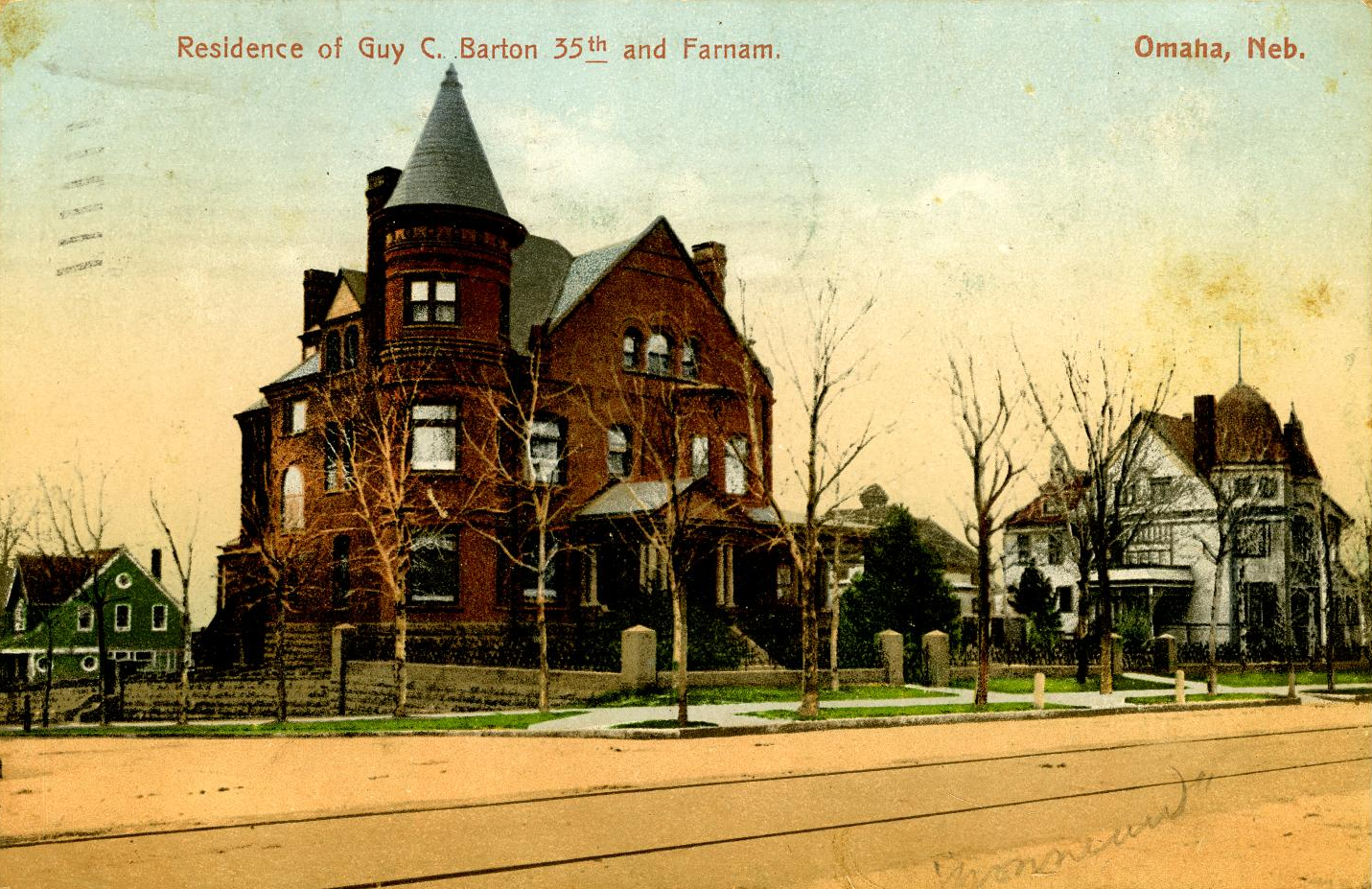
- 1907 postcard view
- Interactive map of Guy C. Barton House
- Location: 3522 Farnam St., Omaha, Nebraska
- Coordinates: 41°15′29″N 95°57′52″W
- Area: 0.3 acres (0.12 ha)
- Built: 1899
- Architect: Henry Ives Cobb
- Architectural style: Richardsonian Romanesque
- NRHP reference No.: 73001060

Significant dates
- Added to NRHP: August 14, 1973
- Removed from NRHP: March 5, 2018

The Guy C. Barton House was a very elaborate and expensive Victorian home in the Midtown area of Omaha, Nebraska, United States, a home and entertaining center of an industrialist and philanthropist. The house caught fire and was demolished in 1982.

Guy Conger Barton was president of the Omaha and Grant Smelting Company (associated with the American Smelting and Mining Company), president of the Omaha and Council Bluffs Street Railway (which built the Douglas Street Bridge over the Missouri River), president of the South Omaha National Bank, and was involved in other businesses as well.

It was designed by Chicago architect Henry Ives Cobb, a leader in Richardsonian Romanesque style, on commission for Barton. The mansion was built in 1899 at cost of $250,000. The three-story red brick mansion was located at 3522 Farnum Street.

Details in its National Register nomination include: "The main entrance, facing the south, is sided by a three-story Victorian tower on the west. The highly decorative cast-iron double doors cost $7,000 when they were first installed. The entrance hall is of solid mahogany wall panels and stanchions that are draped and tapestried in two-tone velours. On the left of the entrance hall is the music room or "Gold Room" which is decorated in Louis XV style."

It was site of great parties. In its National Register nomination it was stated that the house "portrays a past era unique not only in architectural movements but also in the socio-economic development of capitalism of America." It was deemed significant as "a perfect example of Victorian elegance at its highest. The architectural style is a romantic adaptation of Victorian and Romanesque."

The property included a large carriage house with stables below. This provided quarters for a coachman, horses, and "special quarters for the family cow which was kept there as late as 1915" when it was owned by H. S. Clarke, another banker.

A wine cellar with capacity for 1,250 bottles was protected by a heavy door and a burglar alarm connected to Mr. Barton's bedroom.

An underground passage provided access from the house to the stables.

There was a fire.

In 1982 the Security National Bank took steps towards demolition of the building; a law firm opposed that and appealed to Secretary of the Interior James G. Watt.

The mansion later became the Heafey & Heafey Mortuary.

It was demolished in 1982.

It was delisted (removed) from the National Register in 2018.

Barton's collection of paintings is described in "History of the City of Omaha Nebraska".

Barton is also associated with 2226 Howard St. and businesses not mentioned above.
