= Ak-Sar-Ben Bridge =

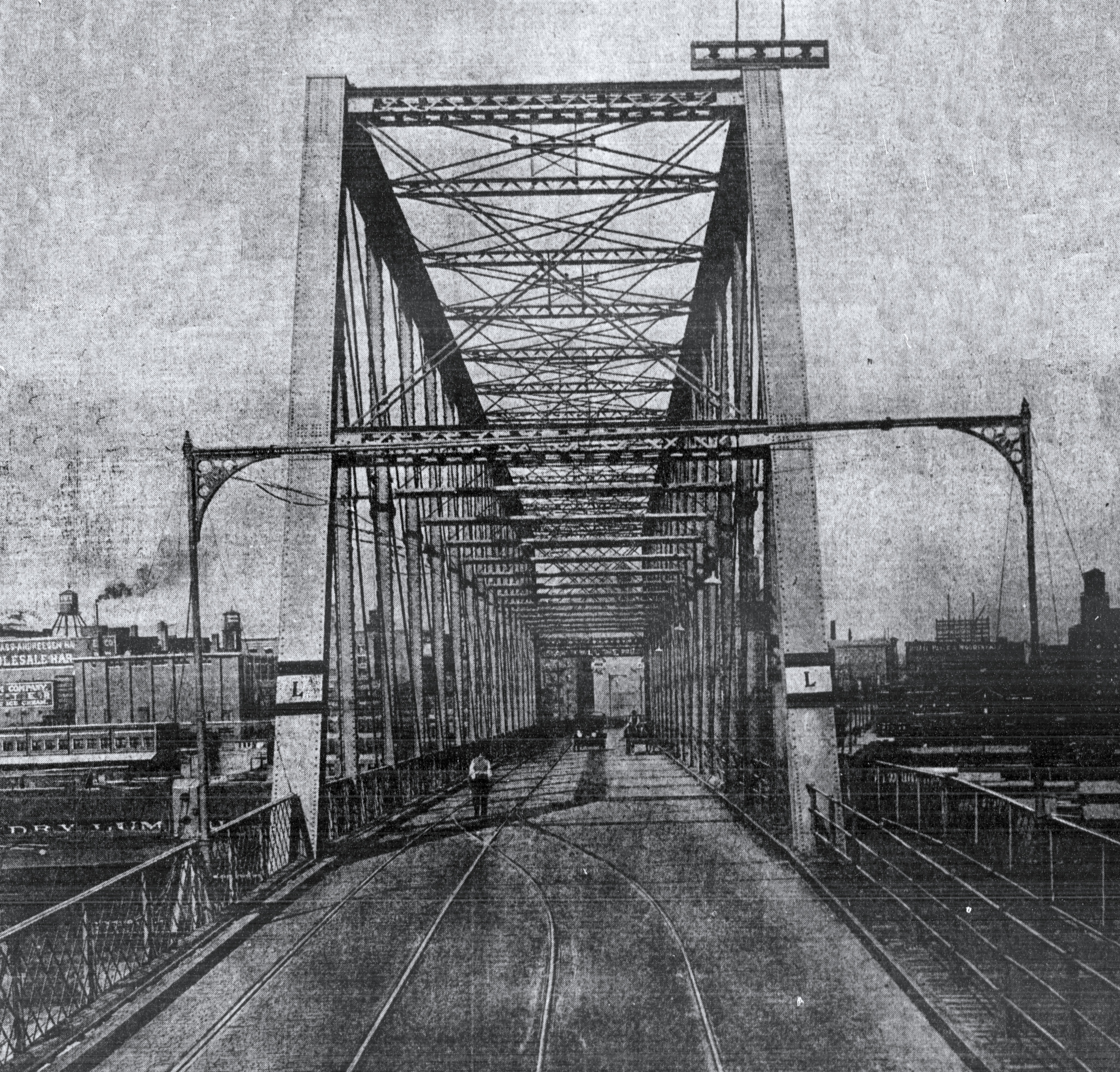
- The bridge in 1914
- Coordinates: 41.2598°N 95.9210°W
- Carries: Road vehicles
- Crosses: Missouri River
- Locale: Omaha, Nebraska
- Official name: Douglas Street Bridge
- Owner: Group of businessmen (including Guy C. Barton)
- Followed by: Grenville Dodge Bridge I-480 girder bridge

History
- Engineering design by: Omaha and Council Bluffs Street Railway Company
- Opened: 1888
- Closed: 1966

Location
- Interactive map of Ak-Sar-Ben Bridge

The Ak-Sar-Ben Bridge was a Whipple through truss bridge that was the first road bridge to cross the Missouri River connecting Omaha, Nebraska and Council Bluffs, Iowa. It was replaced in 1966 by the Interstate 480 girder bridge.

== History ==
Originally called the Douglas Street Bridge, the bridge was built by the Omaha and Council Bluffs Street Railway Company in 1888 at a cost of $500,000. It was designed to handle streetcars and replaced a ferry service that had opened in 1854. It was originally built as a single bridge. Due to increased demand, they built a twin sister bridge next to the existing one. It was the Lincoln Highway bridge from 1913 to 1930. (Notice the L for Lincoln Highway in the picture.) It was then the Highway 30 bridge, then Highway 30A, then Highway 30 S until its destruction.

== Tolls ==
It was a toll bridge. As automobiles became more popular, there were resentments about the tolls. In 1895, a group of businessmen formed the "Knights of Ak-Sar-Ben" ("Nebraska" spelled backward). In 1938, they sold bonds to finance the purchase of the bridge for $2,350,000. They continued to charge tolls until 1947, at which point the bonds were paid off and the structure, along with the South Omaha Bridge, became free bridges. The hated toll booths were paraded through Omaha before a crowd of 35,000 observers to celebrate Free Bridge Day on September 24, 1947. The estimated traffic on the bridge doubled the following year.

== Replacement and removal ==
In November 1966, the Ak-Sar-Ben Bridge was replaced by an unnamed girder bridge that was part of Interstate 480; the interstate would go on to be renamed the "Gerald R. Ford Expressway" in 1982 after native son president Gerald R. Ford. Attempts were made to salvage the bridge as a pedestrian walkway, but it was demolished in 1968. The east pier remains in the river just south of the interstate on the Council Bluffs side. U.S. Route 6 overlaps the interstate as it crosses the river.

== See also ==
- List of crossings of the Missouri River
