= Pioneer Farm =

Historic house in New York, United States

- U.S. National Register of Historic Places
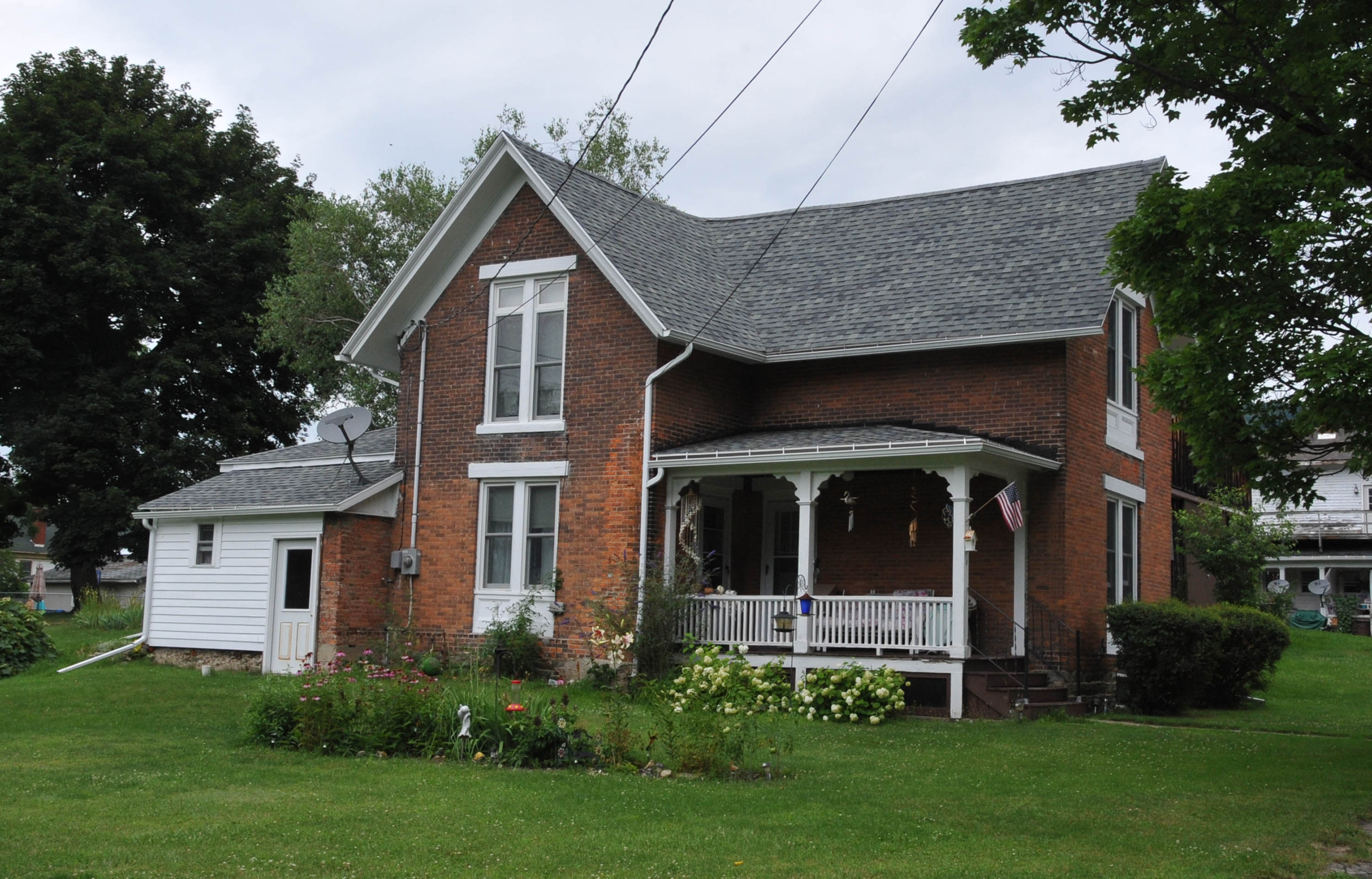

- Location within New York Location within the United States
- Nearest city: Dansville, New York
- Coordinates: 42°33′4″N 77°42′4″W
- Area: 0.1 acres (0.040 ha)
- Built: 1822
- Architect: McCurdy, James
- NRHP reference No.: 70000422
- Added to NRHP: December 18, 1970

Pioneer Farm, also known as the McCurdy House, is a historic home located at Dansville in Livingston County, New York. It is a two-story brick residence built in 1822 by James McCurdy, son of Dansville's first settler.

It was listed on the National Register of Historic Places in 1970.
