= Ak-Sar-Ben (arena) =

Sports complex in Omaha, Nebraska

Ak-Sar-Ben Race Track and Coliseum
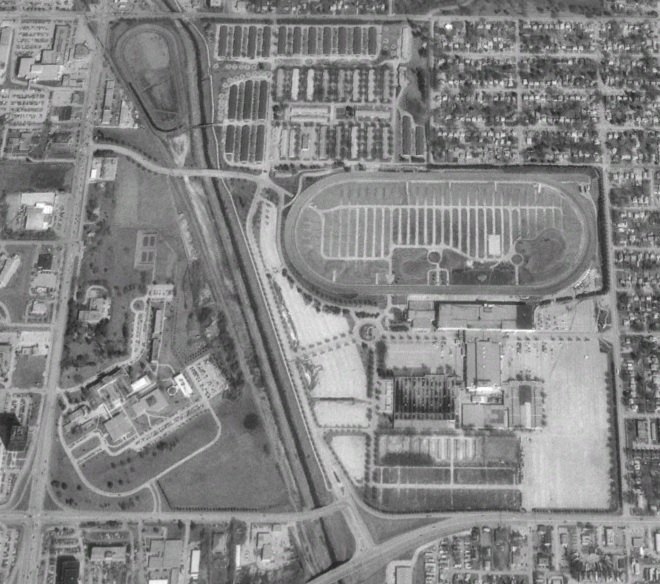
- Aerial view of the facility in 1993

- Location in the United States] Location in Nebraska
- Interactive map of Ak-Sar-Ben Race Track and Coliseum
- Address: 6800 Mercy Road
- Location: Omaha, Nebraska, U.S.
- Coordinates: 41.240°N 96.013°W
- Owner: Ak-Sar-Ben Future Trust; Douglas County
- Capacity: 11,500 (Grandstand); 7,200 (Coliseum)

Construction
- Opened: July 6, 1919 (Race track); June 9, 1929 (Coliseum)
- Renovated: 1921, 1938, 1965, 1986
- Expanded: 1928, 1975
- Closed: August 8, 1995 (Race track); September 2002 (Coliseum)
- Demolished: October 8, 2004
- Cost: $1 million ($18.6 million in 2025 dollars)

Tenants
- Omaha Knights (IHL) (1959–63); Omaha Knights (CPHL) (1963–65); Omaha Knights (CHL) (1966–75); Omaha Racers (CBA) (1989–97)

The Ak-Sar-Ben Race Track and Coliseum was an indoor arena and horse racing complex in the central United States, located in Omaha, Nebraska.

Built to fund the civic and philanthropic activities of the Knights of Ak-Sar-Ben, the Thoroughbred race track was built in 1919, and the Coliseum in 1929. The racetrack closed in 1995 and the arena in 2002; the facility was demolished in 2005, and is currently being redeveloped for a variety of uses, including dormitory housing for the University of Nebraska Omaha and the Aksarben Village development.

Ak-Sar-Ben is "Nebraska" spelled backwards; the Knights originally said they were turning Nebraska around, thus "Ak-Sar-Ben."

== History ==
=== Coliseum ===
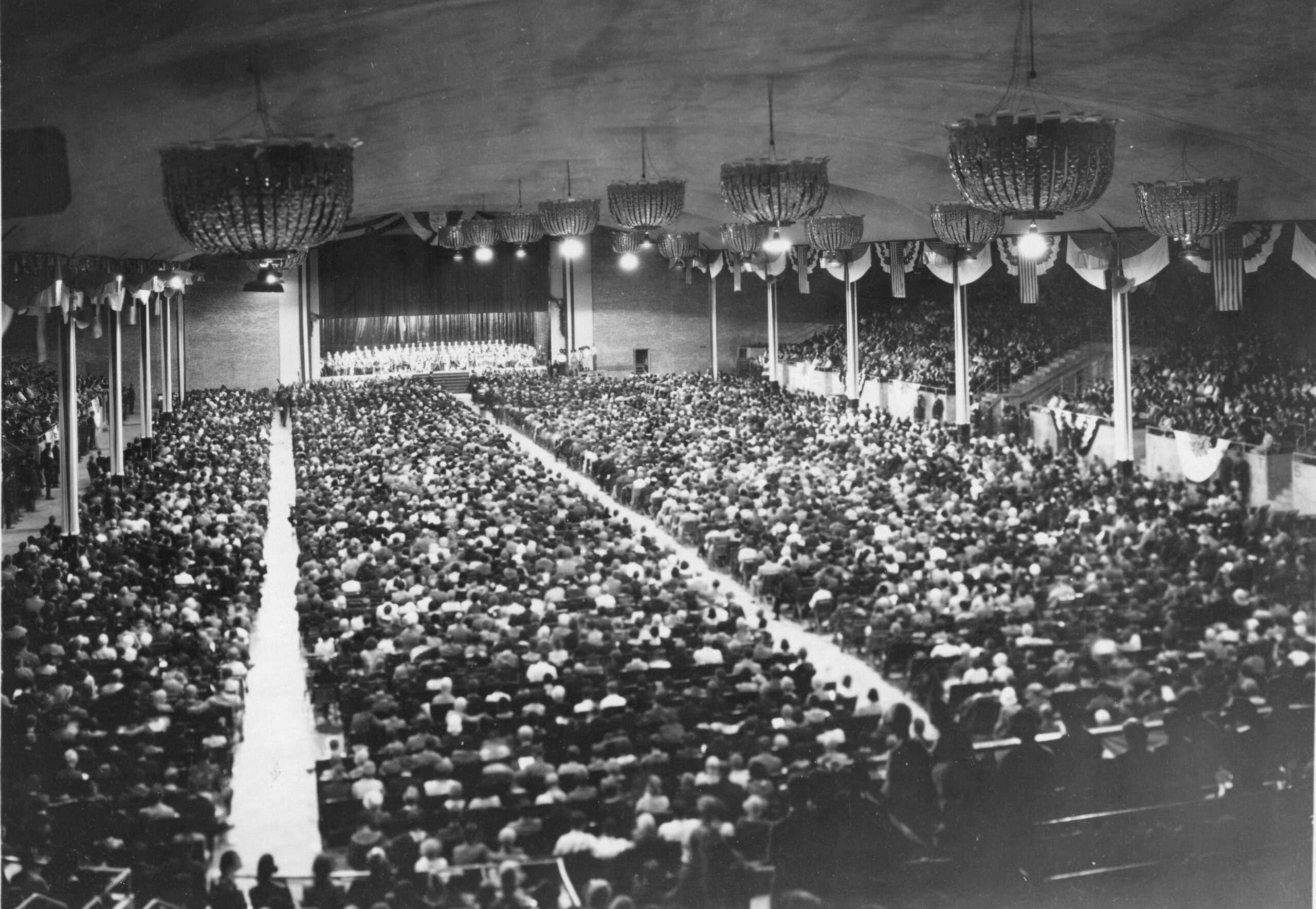
A meeting during the Sixth National Eucharistic Congress in the coliseum

Ak-Sar-Ben Coliseum was the premiere ice rink and concert arena in Omaha for more than 70 years. Popular acts ranging from Frank Sinatra to Elvis Presley to Nirvana all performed to sold-out crowds. It was also home to the Omaha Knights, a minor league hockey team from 1959 to 1975. The Knights began operations in 1959 in the IHL, and later moved to the now-defunct CHL, with teams affiliated with the NHL's Montreal Canadiens, New York Rangers, and both the Calgary and Atlanta Flames. The arena hosted the Omaha Racers basketball of the CBA from 1989 to 1997. The Coliseum also hosted world-class boxing, was a major stop on the PBR and attracted many popular comedians.

=== Horse racing ===
In the racetrack's glory days, the Coliseum housed a cinema-sized screen and betting windows to handle the overflow of fans. In the mid-1980s, Ak-Sar-Ben was tenth in the nation in racetrack attendance, with up to 25,000 betting $2 million per day on weekends. Punters came to the track from all around the Great Plains, as pari-mutuel betting was illegal in many of Nebraska's neighboring states such as Iowa, Missouri and Kansas. Many festivals were also held in the Coliseum annually, including a Greek Festival and River City Roundup booths.

Following his death in 1959, the 1935 Triple Crown winner Omaha was buried at the racetrack's Circle of Champions. The thoroughbred spent his final nine years at a farm outside of Nebraska City and made promotional appearances at the Ak-Sar-Ben racetrack during the 1950s.

== Closure and demolition ==
Horse racing at Ak-Sar-Ben ended in August 1995, just ten years after its record season of 1985. Greyhound and horse racing began in adjacent Iowa in 1986, the dogs would be legalized three years later in Kansas, and finally casino gambling began operations in Missouri in 1993: Ak-Sar-Ben's attendances never recovered, as gamblers who would previously travel to Omaha now had options closer to home. A portion of the property was sold to First Data Resources under the agreement that FDR would donate part of the land to the University of Nebraska Omaha (UNO) for its Aksarben Campus to build a new College of Information and Technology.

After the remaining buildings and grandstand were torn down in early 2005, a proposal was put forth to create a mixed-use development called Aksarben Village. Construction began in 2006 and the first businesses opened in 2008. Baxter Arena, home to several of UNO's sports teams, opened in October 2015.

Following the closure of the racetrack, simulcast facility Horsemen's Park (41.204°N 96.011°W) was opened near Ralston in 1998. The horse racing industry in Nebraska is now confined to live racing dates rotating from Fonner Park in Grand Island, to the Lincoln Race Course in Lincoln, and finishing at Agricultural Park in Columbus, plus a four-day meet at Horsemen's Park (the latter required to keep their simulcasting license). A fourth track, Atokad in the northeast part of the state, also holds a brief meeting each year.

== See also ==
- Culture in Omaha, Nebraska
- Sports in Omaha, Nebraska
