= Geolocation in online gambling =

Application of geolocation technology

Geolocation is an important technology in the online gambling industry. Different countries, states and jurisdictions have different laws ranging from complete prohibition to no laws at all, making online gambling de facto legal and unregulated. To determine whether a potential online gambler should be allowed to deposit, play or even view an online casino it is necessary to determine the individual's physical location.

Online casinos and poker rooms have used geolocation in various ways over time. The first online casinos existed when few laws governed the internet (let alone online gambling), and players were simply asked to state their location. As laws regulating online gambling were passed, it became necessary to use technology to prove the physical location of players.

== Technology ==
When the first hand of licensed and regulated online poker in the United States was dealt in Nevada on April 30, 2013 by UltimatePoker.com, the site relied on a combination of a player's IP address and GPS signal from their cellular phone. Many players experienced problems from this process that made it difficult or even impossible for them to be correctly geolocated in Nevada and prevented them from playing. Initially players located near the state's borders could not be geolocated with enough precision to allow them to pass the Nevada location check. People who did not have mobile phones could not play at all.

As the industry expanded to the state of New Jersey, a new method of geolocation was deployed. This method triangulated wifi networks near the player to determine his or her physical location. This method was much more precise. Players reported fewer difficulties and even those located close to New Jersey's border could still correctly pass the geolocation check.

In order to prevent players outside a regulated state from bypassing the geolocation test using VPNs, the software checks for VPN and remote access software running on the player's system. If any such software is detected, the player is not allowed to wager.

== Applications ==
In 2018, Pennsylvania became the fourth US state to license and regulate the industry. One requirement in Pennsylvania is that online gambling is not permitted inside brick and mortar casinos. This presents the unique challenge of disallowing play in certain physical locations within a state in which online gambling is otherwise authorized. Additionally in 2018 the US Supreme Court found the national Professional and Amateur Sports Protection Act of 1992 to be unconstitutional, paving the way for states to authorize sports betting. Since mobile device sports betting is a popular pastime, more states are likely to require geolocation services.
