= Nashua High School =

Nashua High School may refer to:

- Nashua High School South, formerly known as Nashua High School, a high school in Nashua, New Hampshire, United States
- Nashua High School North, a high school in Nashua, New Hampshire, United States
- Nashua High School (Montana) in Nashua, Montana
