= Nodaway River Bridge =

Bridge in Iowa, U.S.

- U.S. National Register of Historic Places
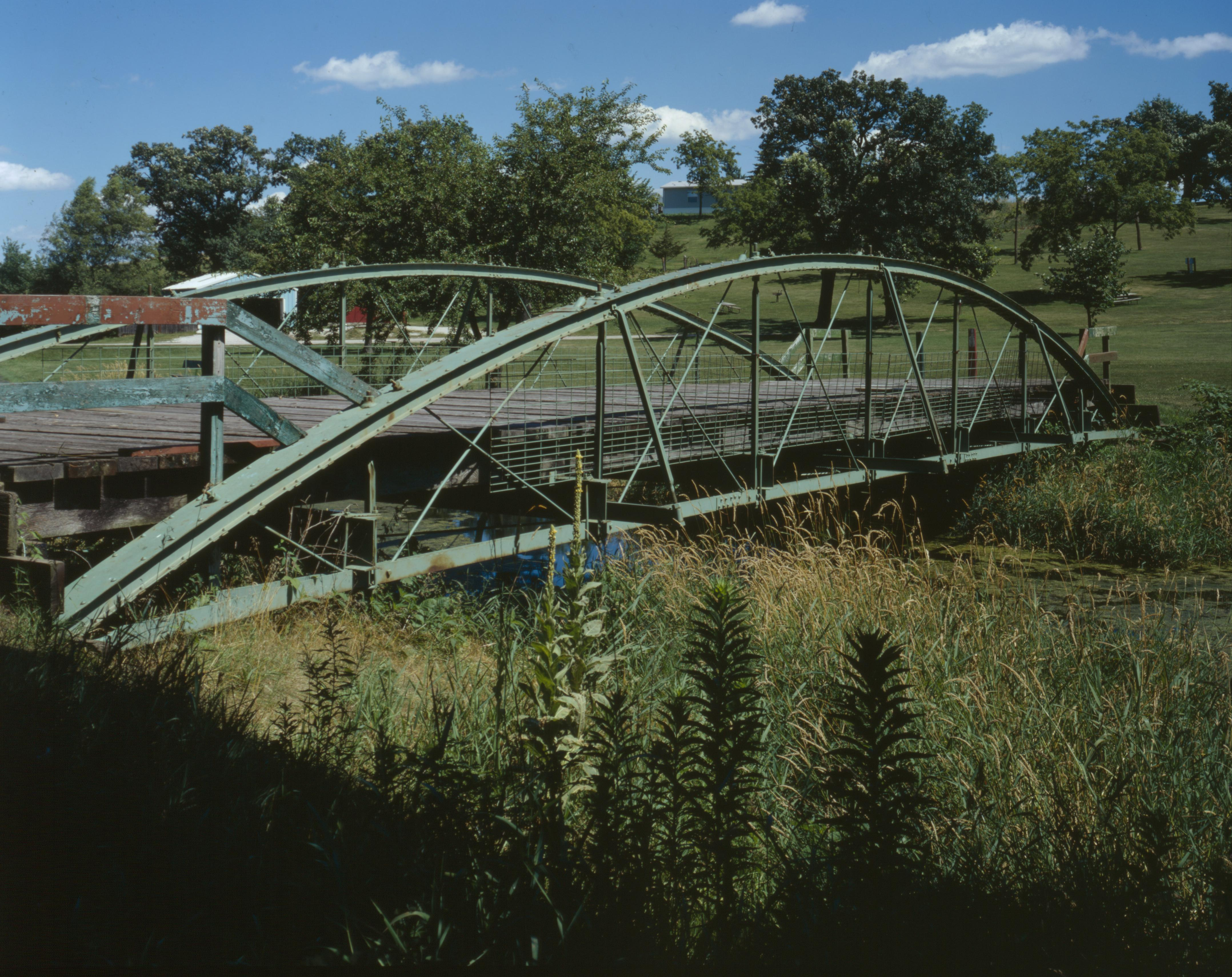

- Location within Iowa Location within the United States
- Location: Pedestrian path in Pilot Grove County Park
- Nearest city: Grant, Iowa
- Coordinates: 41°08′46″N 95°02′34″W
- Area: less than one acre
- Built: 1876
- Architect: Missouri Valley Bridge & Iron Co.
- Architectural style: Bowstring arch bridge
- MPS: Highway Bridges of Iowa MPS
- NRHP reference No.: 98000494
- Added to NRHP: June 25, 1998

Nodaway River Bridge is located west of Grant, Iowa, United States. It spans an arm of a small pond in Pilot Grove County Park for 70 feet (21 m). The Montgomery County Board of Supervisors accepted a petition from S. M. Smith to build a bridge over the Nodaway River south of Grant in June 1876, and another bridge over the Nishnabotna River at the same time. The county contracted with the Missouri Valley Bridge & Iron Co. of Leavenworth, Kansas, to design and build the Nodaway River bridge, which was completed later the same year for $1,000. The bridge consists of a single-span Bowstring arch-truss with a wood deck. It remained in use as a road bridge until 1968, when it was moved to the park for use as a pedestrian bridge. Even though it is no longer in its historic location and used for its historic function, the bridge was listed on the National Register of Historic Places in 1998 as an example of early transportation development in Iowa.

== See also ==
- List of bridges documented by the Historic American Engineering Record in Iowa
