= Grant Commercial Historic District =

Grant Commercial Historic District may refer to:

- Grant Commercial Historic District (Grant, Iowa), listed on the NRHP in Montgomery County, Iowa
- Grant Commercial Historic District (Grant, Nebraska), NRHP-listed
