= USS LST-550 =

1944 LST-542-class tank landing ship

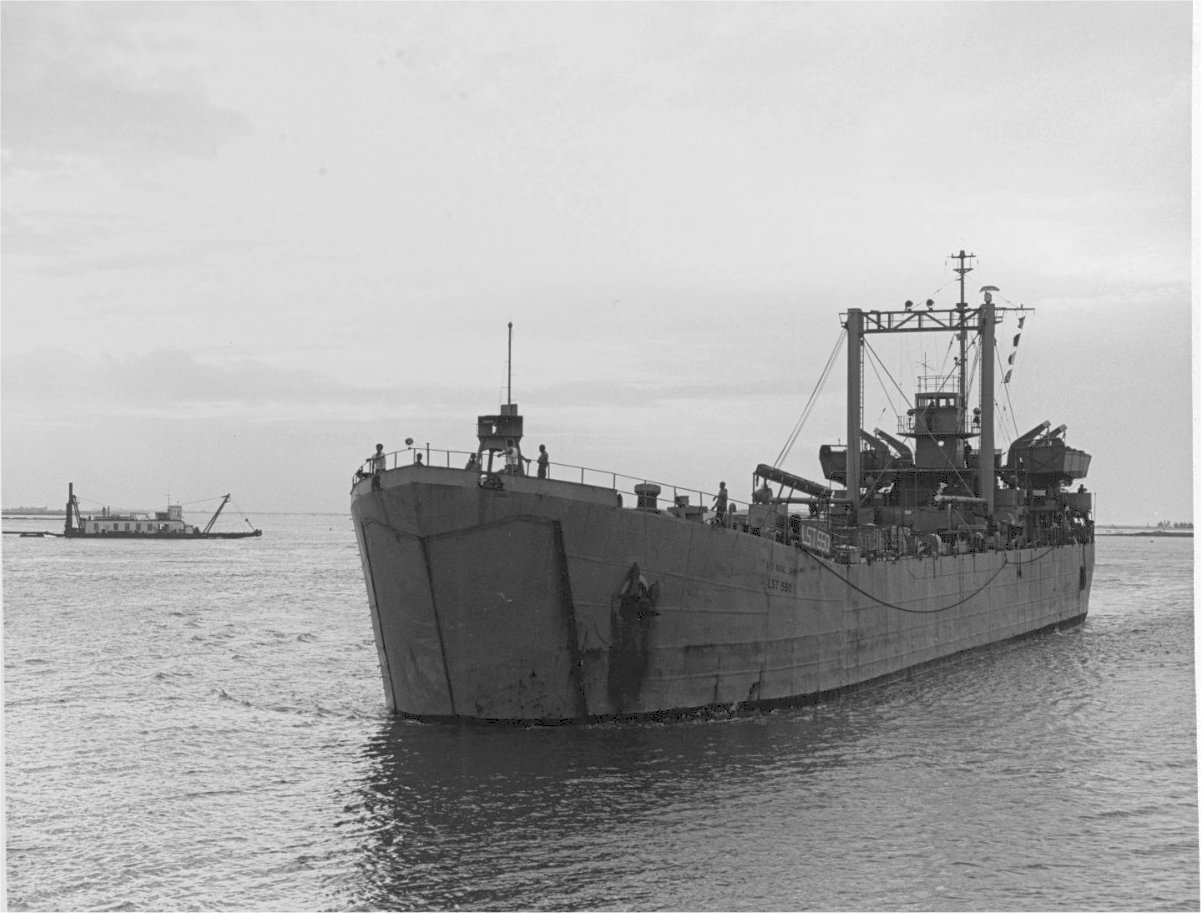
- USNS LST-550 glides up the Perfume River with a load of supplies for allied forces near the DMZ, circa April 1968

History

United States
- Name: USS LST-550
- Builder: Missouri Valley Bridge and Iron Company, Evansville, Indiana
- Laid down: 13 November 1943
- Launched: 9 March 1944
- Sponsored by: Mrs. Henry D. Hoover
- Commissioned: 10 April 1944
- Decommissioned: 13 January 1946
- In service: In non-commissioned service with Military Sea Transportation Service as USNS LST-550 (T-LST-550) from 31 March 1952
- Stricken: 1 November 1973
- Honors and awards: Two battle stars for World War II

General characteristics
- Class & type: LST-542-class tank landing ship
- Displacement: 1,780 long tons (1,809 t) light; 3,640 long tons (3,698 t) full
- Length: 328 ft (100 m)
- Beam: 50 ft (15 m)
- Draft: Unloaded 2 ft 4 in (0.71 m) bow; 7 ft 6 in (2.29 m) stern; Full load: 8 ft 2 in (2.49 m) forward; 14 ft 1 in (4.29 m) aft
- Installed power: 1,800 horsepower (1.34 megawatts)
- Propulsion: Two 900-horsepower (0.67-megawatt) General Motors 12-567 diesel engines, two shafts, twin rudders
- Speed: 12 knots (22 km/h; 14 mph)
- Boats & landing craft carried: 2 x LCVPs
- Troops: Approximately 130 officers and enlisted men
- Complement: 8-10 officers, 89-100 enlisted men
- Armament: 2 × twin 40 mm gun mounts; 4 × single 40-millimeter gun mounts; 12 × 20 mm guns

USS LST-550 was a United States Navy LST-542-class tank landing ship in commission from 1944 to 1946. She also served in a non-commissioned status with the Military Sea Transportation Service as USNS LST-550 (T-LST-550) from 1952.

== Construction and commissioning ==
LST-550 was laid down on 13 November 1943 at Evansville, Indiana, by the Missouri Valley Bridge and Iron Company. She was launched on 9 March 1944, sponsored by Mrs. Henry D. Hoover, and commissioned on 10 April 1944.

== Service history ==
=== Commissioned service ===
During World War II, LST-550 initially was assigned to the European Theater of Operations. She participated in Operation Dragoon, the invasion of southern France, in August and September 1944.

LST-550 subsequently was assigned to the Pacific Theater of Operations, where she took part in the assault on and occupation of Okinawa Gunto in June 1945.

Following the war, LST-550 performed occupation duty in the Far East until late December 1945, when she returned to the United States.

LST-550 was decommissioned on 13 January 1946.

=== Non-commissioned service in Military Sea Transportation Service ===
On 31 March 1952, LST-550 was transferred to the Military Sea Transportation Service, where she served in a non-commissioned status as USNS LST-550 (T-LST-550).

== Final disposition ==
USNS LST-550 was stricken from the Navy List on 1 November 1973. Her ultimate fate awaits further research.

== Honors and awards ==
LST-550 earned two battle stars for World War II service.
