= USS LST-573 =

1944 LST-542-class tank landing ship

History

United States
- Name: LST-573
- Builder: Missouri Valley Bridge and Iron Company, Evansville, Indiana
- Laid down: 15 April 1944
- Launched: 31 May 1944
- Sponsored by: Mrs. Ernest C. Strpebe
- Commissioned: 21 June 1944
- Decommissioned: 24 January 1946

History
- Operator: Commander Naval Forces Far East
- In service: date unknown
- Out of service: date unknown
- Renamed: Q027
- Stricken: 31 October 1947

History
- Operator: Maritime Commission (MARAD)
- Acquired: 26 May 1948
- Identification: Hull symbol:LST-573; Code letters:NEWS
- Honors and awards: 3 × battle stars
- Fate: Sold for scrapping, 26 May 1948

General characteristics
- Class & type: LST-542-class tank landing ship
- Displacement: 1,625 long tons (1,651 t) (light); 4,080 long tons (4,145 t) (full (seagoing draft with 1,675 short tons (1,520 t) load)
- Length: 328 ft (100 m) oa
- Beam: 50 ft (15 m)
- Draft: Unloaded: 2 ft 4 in (0.71 m) forward; 7 ft 6 in (2.29 m) aft; Full load: 8 ft 2 in (2.49 m) forward; 14 ft 1 in (4.29 m) aft; Landing with 500 short tons (450 t) load: 3 ft 11 in (1.19 m) forward; 9 ft 10 in (3.00 m) aft
- Installed power: 2 × 900 hp (670 kW) General Motors 12-567A diesel engines, 1,700 shp (1,300 kW)
- Propulsion: 1 × Falk main reduction gears; 2 × screws
- Speed: 12 kn (22 km/h; 14 mph)
- Range: 24,000 nmi (44,000 km; 28,000 mi) at 9 kn (17 km/h; 10 mph) while displacing 3,960 long tons (4,024 t)
- Boats & landing craft carried: 2 x LCVPs
- Capacity: 1,600–1,900 st (22,000–27,000 lb; 10,000–12,000 kg) cargo depending on mission
- Troops: 16 officers, 147 enlisted men
- Complement: 7 officers, 104 enlisted men
- Armament: 2 × twin 40 mm (1.6 in) Bofors guns; 4 × single 40mm Bofors guns; 12 × 20 mm (0.79 in) Oerlikon cannons

Service record
- Operations: Battle of Leyte (18–29 October 1944); Battle of Mindoro (12–18 December 1944); Battle of Mindanao (18 March 1945); Battle of the Visayas (29 March–1 April 1945)
- Awards: American Campaign Medal; Asiatic–Pacific Campaign Medal; World War II Victory Medal; Navy Occupation Service Medal w/Asia Clasp; Philippine Republic Presidential Unit Citation; Philippine Liberation Medal

USS LST-573 was a United States Navy LST-542-class tank landing ship used in the Asiatic-Pacific Theater during World War II.

== Construction and commissioning ==
LST-573 was laid down on 15 April 1944 at Evansville, Indiana, by the Missouri Valley Bridge and Iron Company. She was launched on 31 May 1944, sponsored by Mrs. Ernest C. Strpebe, and commissioned on 21 June 1944.

== Service history ==
During the war, LST-573 was assigned to the Pacific Theater of Operations. She took part in the Philippines campaign, participating in the Battle of Leyte landing in October and November 1944, the Battle of Mindoro in December 1944, the Battle of Mindanao in March 1945, and the Battle of the Visayas in March and April 1945.

Following the war, LST-573 performed occupation duty in the Far East until mid-January 1946. Upon her return to the United States, she was decommissioned on 24 January 1946 and struck from the Navy list on 31 October 1947. On 26 May 1948, the ship was sold to the Bethlehem Steel Co., of Bethlehem, Pennsylvania.

== Honors and awards ==
LST-573 earned three battle stars for her World War II service.

== Notes ==
Citations

== Bibliography ==
Online sources

- "LST-573". Dictionary of American Naval Fighting Ships. Naval History and Heritage Command. 3 August 2015.
- "USS LST-573". NavSource. 19 December 2014.
