= USS LST-594 =

1944 LST-542-class tank landing ship

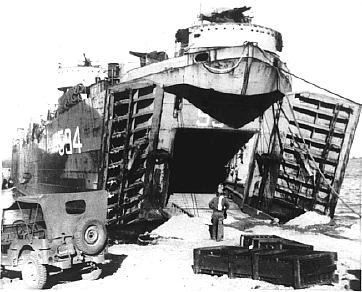
- USS LST-594 beached at Hollandia, New Guinea in 1944.

History

United States
- Name: USS LST-594
- Ordered: 2 August 1943
- Builder: Missouri Valley Bridge & Iron Co., Evansville, Indiana
- Laid down: 1 July 1944
- Launched: 12 August 1944
- Commissioned: 6 September 1944
- Decommissioned: 21 February 1946
- Stricken: 5 March 1947
- Fate: 4 June 1947, Sold to the government of South Korea, fate unknown.

General characteristics
- Class & type: LST-542-class tank landing ship
- Displacement: 1,625 t (1,599 LT) Light; 4,080 t (4,020 LT) Full Load
- Length: 328 ft (100 m)
- Beam: 50 ft (15 m)
- Draft: light 2 ft 4 in (0.71 m) fwd, 7 ft 6 in (2.29 m) aft; sea-going 8 ft 3 in (2.51 m) fwd, 14 ft 1 in (4.29 m) aft; landing 3 ft 11 in (1.19 m) fwd, 9 ft 10 in (3.00 m) aft (landing w/500 ton load); limiting 11 ft 2 in (3.40 m); maximum navigation 14 ft 1 in (4.29 m)
- Propulsion: 2 × General Motors 12-567A, 900hp Diesel engines; 1 × Falk Main Reduction Gears; 2 × propellers
- Speed: 11.6 kn (13.3 mph)
- Range: 24,000 mi (39,000 km) @ 9 kn (10 mph) while displacing 3960 tons
- Boats & landing craft carried: 2 ×LCVPs
- Complement: 13 officers 104 enlisted
- Armament: 2 × Twin 40mm anti-aircraft guns w/Mk. 51 directors; 4 × Single 40mm anti-aircraft guns; 12 × Single 20mm anti-aircraft guns

USS LST-594 was an LST-542-class tank landing ship, built for the United States Navy during World War II. The "LST" stands for Landing Ship, Tank, while "USS" stands for United States Ship. LST-594 was part of the second wave of LSTs, denoted LST Mk.2s, which began production in 1943, replacing the earlier Mk.1 version. Within the Mk.2 version, there were three classes: LST-1, LST-491 and LST-542. USS LST-594 was a member of the 542 class, which had several operational and armament upgrades over the prior classes.

== History ==
Construction of LST-594 began on 1 July 1944, when her keel was laid down at Evansville, Indiana by the Missouri Valley Bridge & Iron Company (MVB&I). MVB&I was one of five major inland shipbuilders, and, with International Steel Company (also located in Evansville), contributed the greatest number of LST's to the American war effort. Completed in 43 days, she was launched on 12 August 1944, and was sponsored by Mrs. Everett B. Wiley. She was commissioned 6 September 1944.

The ship was assigned to the Asiatic Pacific Theater. For her efforts, LST-594 was honored with the American Campaign Medal, Asiatic-Pacific Campaign Medal, World War II Victory Medal, Navy Occupation Service Medal (with Asia clasp), and the Philippines Liberation Medal.

Following the end of World War II, LST-594 performed occupation duty in the Far East. She also saw service in China until mid-February 1946. She was decommissioned on 21 February 1946, and struck from the United States Navy list on 5 March 1947. On 4 June 1947, LST-594 was sold to the government of South Korea. Her final fate is unknown.

== Description ==
The 542 class of LSTs, of which LST-594 was one, was the third step in the evolution of Mk.2 LSTs. Changes in the later LST-542 class included the addition of a navigation bridge, the installation of a water distillation plant with a capacity of 4,000 gallons per day, the removal of the tank deck ventilator tubes from the center section of the main deck, the strengthening of the main deck to carry a smaller Landing Craft Tank (LCT), and an upgrade in armor and armament, with the addition of a 3"/50 caliber gun.
