= USS LST-554 =

1944 LST-542-class tank landing ship

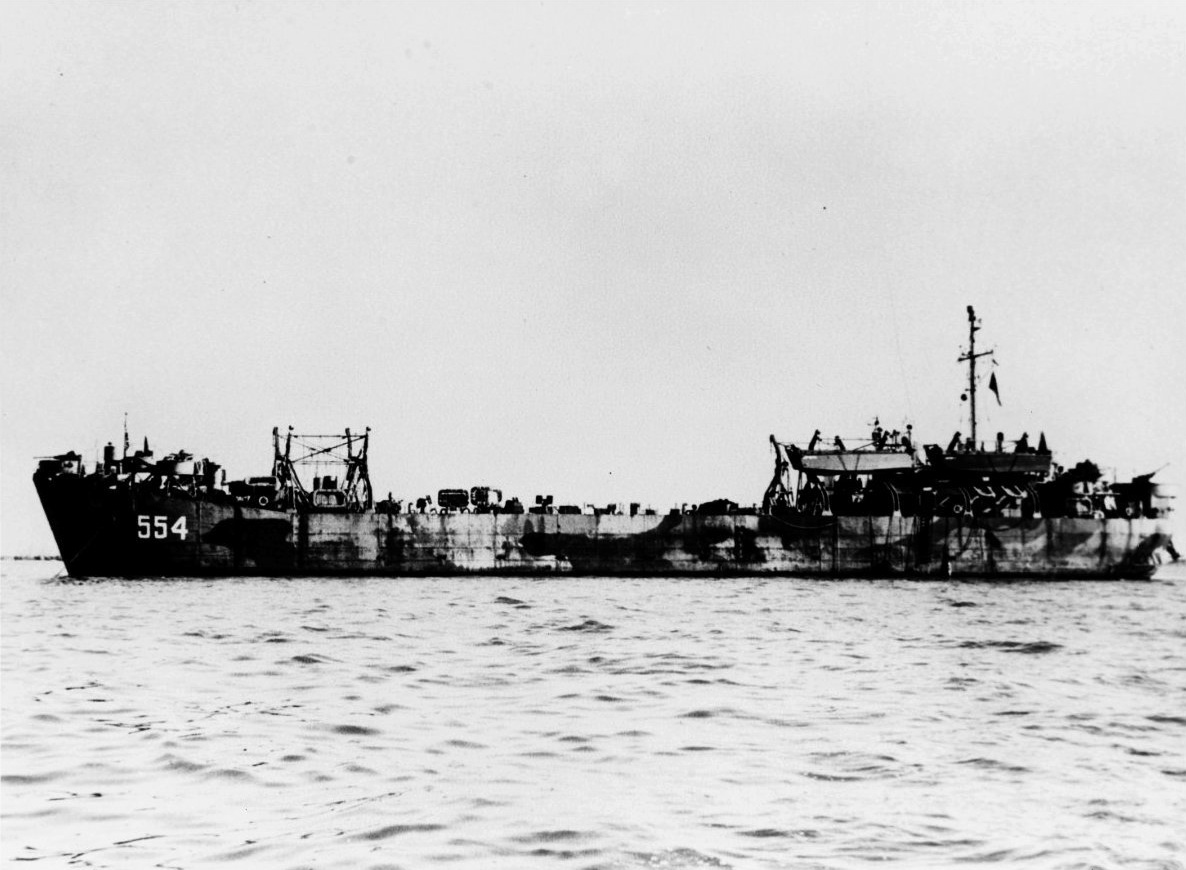
- LST-554 at anchor in San Francisco Bay, circa 1945-46

History

United States
- Name: USS LST-554
- Builder: Missouri Valley Bridge and Iron Company, Evansville, Indiana
- Laid down: 30 January 1944
- Launched: 18 March 1944
- Sponsored by: Mrs. T. R. Davis
- Commissioned: 27 April 1944
- Decommissioned: 20 July 1946
- Stricken: 25 September 1946
- Honors and awards: Four battle stars for World War II
- Fate: Sold for scrapping 29 March 1948

General characteristics
- Class & type: LST-542-class tank landing ship
- Displacement: 1,780 long tons (1,809 t) light; 3,640 long tons (3,698 t) full load
- Length: 328 ft (100 m)
- Beam: 50 ft (15 m)
- Draft: Unloaded 2 ft 4 in (0.71 m) forward; 7 ft 6 in (2.29 m) aft; Full load: 8 ft 2 in (2.49 m) forward; 14 ft 1 in (4.29 m) aft
- Installed power: 1,800 horsepower (1.34 megawatts)
- Propulsion: Two 900-horsepower (0.67-megawatt) General Motors 12-567 diesel engines, two shafts, twin rudders
- Speed: 12 knots (22 km/h; 14 mph)
- Boats & landing craft carried: 2 x LCVPs
- Troops: 140 officers and enlisted men
- Complement: 8-10 officers, 100-115 enlisted men
- Armament: 1 × 3 in (76 mm) 50-caliber gun mount; 8 x 40 mm guns; 12 × 20 mm guns; 2 × .50 cal (12.7 mm) machine guns; 4 × .30 cal (7.62 mm) machine guns

USS LST-554 was a United States Navy LST-542-class tank landing ship in commission from 1944 to 1946.

== Construction and commissioning ==
LST-554 was laid down on 30 January 1944 at Evansville, Indiana, by the Missouri Valley Bridge and Iron Company. She was launched on 18 March 1944, sponsored by Mrs. T. R. Davis, and commissioned on 27 April 1944.

== Service history ==
During World War II, LST-554 was assigned to the Pacific Theater of Operations. She participated in the capture and occupation of the southern Palau Islands in September and October 1944. She then took part in the Philippines campaign, participating in the Leyte landings in October and November 1944 and the Lingayen Gulf landings in January 1945. She then participated in the assault on and occupation of Okinawa Gunto in April 1945.

Following the war, LST-554 returned to the United States.

== Decommissioning and disposal ==
LST-554 was decommissioned on 20 July 1946 and stricken from the Navy List on 25 September 1946. On 29 March 1948, she was sold to Kaiser Shipyards, of Vancouver, Washington, for scrapping.

== Honors and awards ==
LST-554 earned four battle stars for her World War II service.
