= USS LST-562 =

1944 LST-542-class tank landing ship

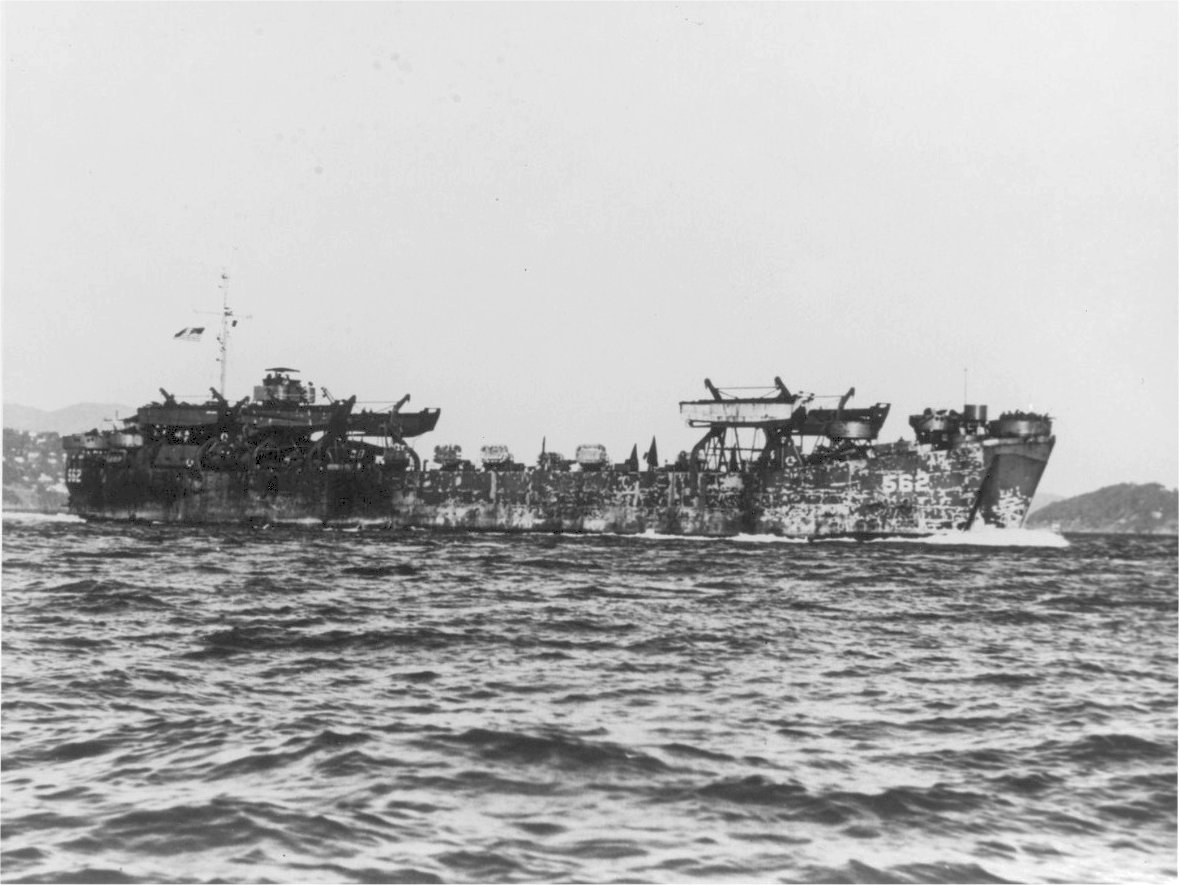
- LST-562 under way in San Francisco Bay, circa early 1946

History

United States
- Name: USS LST-562
- Builder: Missouri Valley Bridge and Iron Company, Evansville, Indiana
- Laid down: 28 February 1944
- Launched: 28 April 1944
- Sponsored by: Mrs. D. A. Nordeen
- Commissioned: 18 May 1944
- Decommissioned: 21 May 1946
- Stricken: 3 July 1946
- Honors and awards: Two battle stars for World War II
- Fate: Sold for scrapping 19 April 1948

General characteristics
- Class & type: LST-542-class tank landing ship
- Displacement: 1,625 long tons (1,651 t) light; 4,080 long tons (4,145 t) full (seagoing draft with 1,675-ton load
- Length: 328 ft (100 m)
- Beam: 50 ft (15 m)
- Draft: Unloaded 2 ft 4 in (0.71 m) forward; 7 ft 6 in (2.29 m) aft; Full load: 8 ft 2 in (2.49 m) forward; 14 ft 1 in (4.29 m) aft; Landing with 500-ton load: 3 ft 11 in (1.19 m) forward; 9 ft 10 in (3.00 m) aft
- Installed power: 1,800 horsepower (1.34 megawatts)
- Propulsion: Two 900-horsepower (0.67-megawatt) General Motors 12-567 diesel engines, two shafts, twin rudders
- Speed: 12 knots (22 km/h; 14 mph)
- Range: 24,000 nautical miles (44,448 kilometerss) at 9 knots while displacing 3,960 tons
- Boats & landing craft carried: 2 x LCVPs
- Capacity: 1,600-1,900 tons cargo depending on mission
- Troops: 16 officers, 147 enlisted men
- Complement: 7 officers, 104 enlisted men
- Armament: 2 × twin 40 mm gun mounts; 4 × single 40-millimeter gun mounts; 12 × 20 mm guns

USS LST-562 was a United States Navy LST-542-class tank landing ship in commission from 1944 to 1946.

== Construction and commissioning ==
LST-562 was laid down on 28 February 1944 at Evansville, Indiana, by the Missouri Valley Bridge and Iron Company. She was launched on 28 April 1944, sponsored by Mrs. D. A. Nordeen, and commissioned on 18 May 1944.

== Service history ==
During World War II, LST-562 was assigned to the Pacific Theater of Operations, where was a unit of LST Division 43 under LST Group 22 (commanded by Commander E. H. Pope, USN), which was a component of LST Flotilla Eight (commanded by Captain E. Watts, USN). She took part in the landings on Morotai in September 1944 and in the Tarakan Island operation in April and May 1945. During the ship's time in commission, the first Captain was succeeded as her commanding officer by Lieutenant F. P. Lawrence, USNR. Note: Lt. Richard N. Shaw, USNR, was the first Captain of LST 652; not LST 562.

Following the war, "LST 562" performed occupation duty in the Far East until mid-December 1945, when she departed for the United States.

== Decommissioning and disposal ==
After returning to the United States, LST-562 was decommissioned on 21 May 1946 and stricken from the Navy List on 3 July 1946. On 19 April 1948, she was sold to the Bethlehem Steel Company of Bethlehem, Pennsylvania, for scrapping.

== Honors and awards ==
LST-562 earned two battle stars for her World War II service.
