= USS LST-564 =

1944 LST-542-class tank landing ship

History

United States
- Name: USS LST-564
- Builder: Missouri Valley Bridge and Iron Company, Evansville, Indiana
- Laid down: 5 March 1944
- Launched: 4 May 1944
- Sponsored by: Mrs. Frances Cassaday
- Commissioned: 25 May 1944
- Decommissioned: 8 March 1946
- Stricken: 1 May 1946
- Honors and awards: Two battle stars for World War II
- Fate: Sold 31 December 1948

General characteristics
- Class & type: LST-542-class tank landing ship
- Displacement: 1,625 long tons (1,651 t) light; 4,080 long tons (4,145 t) full (seagoing draft with 1,675-ton load
- Length: 328 ft (100 m)
- Beam: 50 ft (15 m)
- Draft: Unloaded 2 ft 4 in (0.71 m) forward; 7 ft 6 in (2.29 m) aft; Full load: 8 ft 2 in (2.49 m) forward; 14 ft 1 in (4.29 m) aft; Landing with 500-ton load: 3 ft 11 in (1.19 m) forward; 9 ft 10 in (3.00 m) aft
- Installed power: 1,800 horsepower (1.34 megawatts)
- Propulsion: Two 900-horsepower (0.67-megawatt) General Motors 12-567 diesel engines, two shafts, twin rudders
- Speed: 12 knots (22 km/h; 14 mph)
- Range: 24,000 nautical miles (44,448 kilometerss) at 9 knots while displacing 3,960 tons
- Boats & landing craft carried: 2 x LCVPs
- Capacity: 1,600-1,900 tons cargo depending on mission
- Troops: 16 officers, 147 enlisted men
- Complement: 7 officers, 104 enlisted men
- Armament: 2 × twin 40 mm gun mounts; 4 × single 40-millimeter gun mounts; 12 × 20 mm guns

USS LST-564 was a United States Navy LST-542-class tank landing ship in commission from 1944 to 1946.

== Construction and commissioning ==
LST-564 was laid down on 5 March 1944 at Evansville, Indiana, by the Missouri Valley Bridge and Iron Company. She was launched on 4 May 1944, sponsored by Mrs. Frances Cassaday, and commissioned on 25 May 1944.

== Service history ==
During World War II, LST-564 was assigned to the Pacific Theater of Operations. She took part in the Philippines campaign, participating in the landings on Leyte in October 1944. She then took part in the invasion and occupation of Okinawa from April to June 1945.

Following the war, LST-564 performed occupation duty in the Far East until early November 1945, when she departed for the United States.

== Decommissioning and disposal ==
After returning to the United States, LST-564 was decommissioned on 8 March 1946 and stricken from the Navy List on 1 May 1946. On 31 December 1948, she was sold to Brown & Root, Inc. of Houston, Texas.

== Honors and awards ==
LST-564 earned two battle stars for her World War II service.
