= Ninth Street Bridge =

Ninth Street Bridge may refer to:

- Ninth Street Bridge (Ocean City, New Jersey)
- Ninth Street Bridge (Pittsburgh, Pennsylvania), listed on the National Register of Historic Places in Allegheny County, Pennsylvania
- Ninth Street Bridge (Boise, Idaho), listed on the National Register of Historic Places in Ada County, Idaho
- Ninth Street Bridge over the Gowanus Canal in New York City
