= USS LST-555 =

1944 LST-542-class tank landing ship

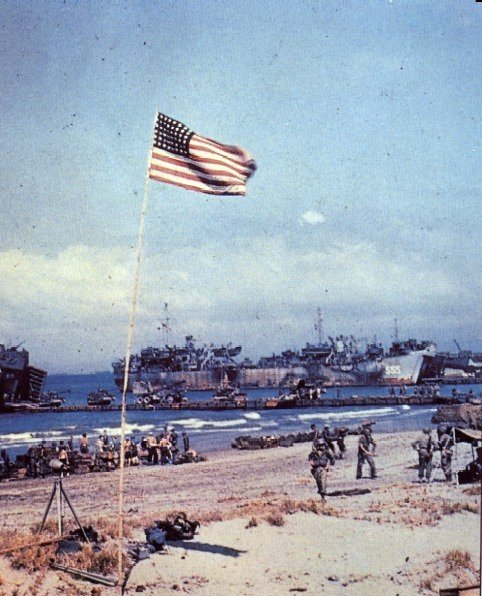
- USS LST-555 unloading cargo at the United States Sixth Army beachhead at Lingayen Gulf on Luzon in the Philippine Islands on 9 January 1945.

History

United States
- Name: USS LST-555
- Builder: Missouri Valley Bridge and Iron Company, Evansville, Indiana
- Laid down: 5 February 1944
- Launched: 22 March 1944
- Sponsored by: Mrs. R. E. Sharp
- Commissioned: 28 April 1944
- Decommissioned: 6 January 1946
- Stricken: 21 January 1946
- Honors and awards: Four battle stars for World War II
- Fate: Hulk destroyed by gunfire 26 January 1946

General characteristics
- Class & type: LST-542-class tank landing ship
- Displacement: 1,625 long tons (1,651 t) light; 4,080 long tons (4,145 t) full (seagoing draft with 1,675-ton load
- Length: 328 ft (100 m)
- Beam: 50 ft (15 m)
- Draft: Unloaded 2 ft 4 in (0.71 m) forward; 7 ft 6 in (2.29 m) aft; Full load: 8 ft 2 in (2.49 m) forward; 14 ft 1 in (4.29 m) aft; Landing with 500-ton load: 3 ft 11 in (1.19 m) forward; 9 ft 10 in (3.00 m) aft
- Installed power: 1,800 horsepower (1.34 megawatts)
- Propulsion: Two 900-horsepower (0.67-megawatt) General Motors 12-567 diesel engines, two shafts, twin rudders
- Speed: 12 knots (22 km/h; 14 mph)
- Range: 24,000 nautical miles (44,448 kilometerss) at 9 knots while displacing 3,960 tons
- Boats & landing craft carried: 2 x LCVPs
- Capacity: 1,600-1,900 tons cargo depending on mission
- Troops: 16 officers, 147 enlisted men
- Complement: 7 officers, 104 enlisted men
- Armament: 2 × twin 40 mm gun mounts; 4 × single 40-millimeter gun mounts; 12 × 20 mm guns

USS LST-555 was a United States Navy LST-542-class tank landing ship in commission from 1944 to 1946.

== Construction and commissioning ==
LST-555 was laid down on 5 February 1944 at Evansville, Indiana, by the Missouri Valley Bridge and Iron Company. She was launched on 22 March 1944, sponsored by Mrs. R. E. Sharp, and commissioned on 28 April 1944.

== Service history ==
During World War II, LST-555 was assigned to the Pacific Theater of Operations. She participated in the capture and occupation of the southern Palau Islands in September and October 1944. She then took part in the Philippines campaign, participating in the Leyte landings in October and November 1944 and the landings at Zambales and Subic Bay in January 1945. She then participated in the assault on and occupation of Okinawa Gunto in April 1945.

Following the war, LST-555 performed occupation duty in the Far East. She was badly damaged by grounding off Wakayama, Japan, on 18 September 1945.

== Decommissioning and disposal ==
LST-555 was decommissioned on 6 January 1946 and stricken from the Navy List on 21 January 1946. Her hulk was destroyed by gunfire on 26 January 1946.

== Honors and awards ==
LST-555 earned four battle stars for her World War II service.
