= USS LST-549 =

1944 LST-542-class tank landing ship

History

United States
- Name: USS LST-549
- Builder: Missouri Valley Bridge and Iron Company, Evansville, Indiana
- Laid down: 4 January 1944
- Launched: 25 February 1944
- Sponsored by: Mrs. E. A. Oberhuber
- Commissioned: 5 April 1944
- Decommissioned: 28 February 1946
- Stricken: 5 December 1947
- Honors and awards: Four battle stars for World War II
- Fate: Sold for scrapping 23 May 1948

General characteristics
- Class & type: LST-542-class tank landing ship
- Displacement: 1,490 long tons (1,514 t) light; 4,080 long tons (4,145 t) full
- Length: 328 ft (100 m)
- Beam: 50 ft (15 m)
- Draft: Unloaded 2 ft 4 in (0.71 m) bow; 7 ft 6 in (2.29 m) stern; Full load: 8 ft 2 in (2.49 m) forward; 14 ft 1 in (4.29 m) aft
- Installed power: 1,800 horsepower (1.34 megawatts)
- Propulsion: Two 900-horsepower (0.67-megawatt) General Motors 12-567 diesel engines, two shafts, twin rudders
- Speed: 12 knots (22 km/h; 14 mph)
- Boats & landing craft carried: 2 x LCVPs
- Troops: 16 officers and 147 enlisted men
- Complement: 7 officers, 104 enlisted men
- Armament: 2 × twin 40 mm gun mounts; 4 × single 40-millimeter gun mounts; 12 × 20 mm guns

USS LST-549 was a United States Navy LST-542-class tank landing ship in commission from 1944 to 1946.

== Construction and commissioning ==
LST-549 was laid down on 4 January 1944 at Evansville, Indiana, by the Missouri Valley Bridge and Iron Company. She was launched on 25 February 1944, sponsored by Mrs. E. A. Oberhuber, and commissioned on 5 April 1944.

== Service history ==
During World War II, LST-549 was assigned to the Pacific Theater of Operations. She participated in the Morotai landings in September 1944. She then took part the Philippines campaign, in which she participated in the Leyte landings in October and November 1944, the Lingayen Gulf landings in January 1945, and the Mindanao Island landings in April 1945.

Following the war, LST-549 performed occupation duty in the Far East and saw service in China before departing in mid-February 1946 to return to the United States.

== Decommissioning and disposal ==
LST-549 was decommissioned on 28 February 1946 and stricken from the Navy List on 5 December 1947. She was sold on 23 May 1948 to Consolidated Builders, Inc., of Morris Heights, the Bronx, New York, for scrapping.

== Honors and awards ==
LST-549 earned four battle stars for World War II service.
