= Stanton, Iowa =

- City
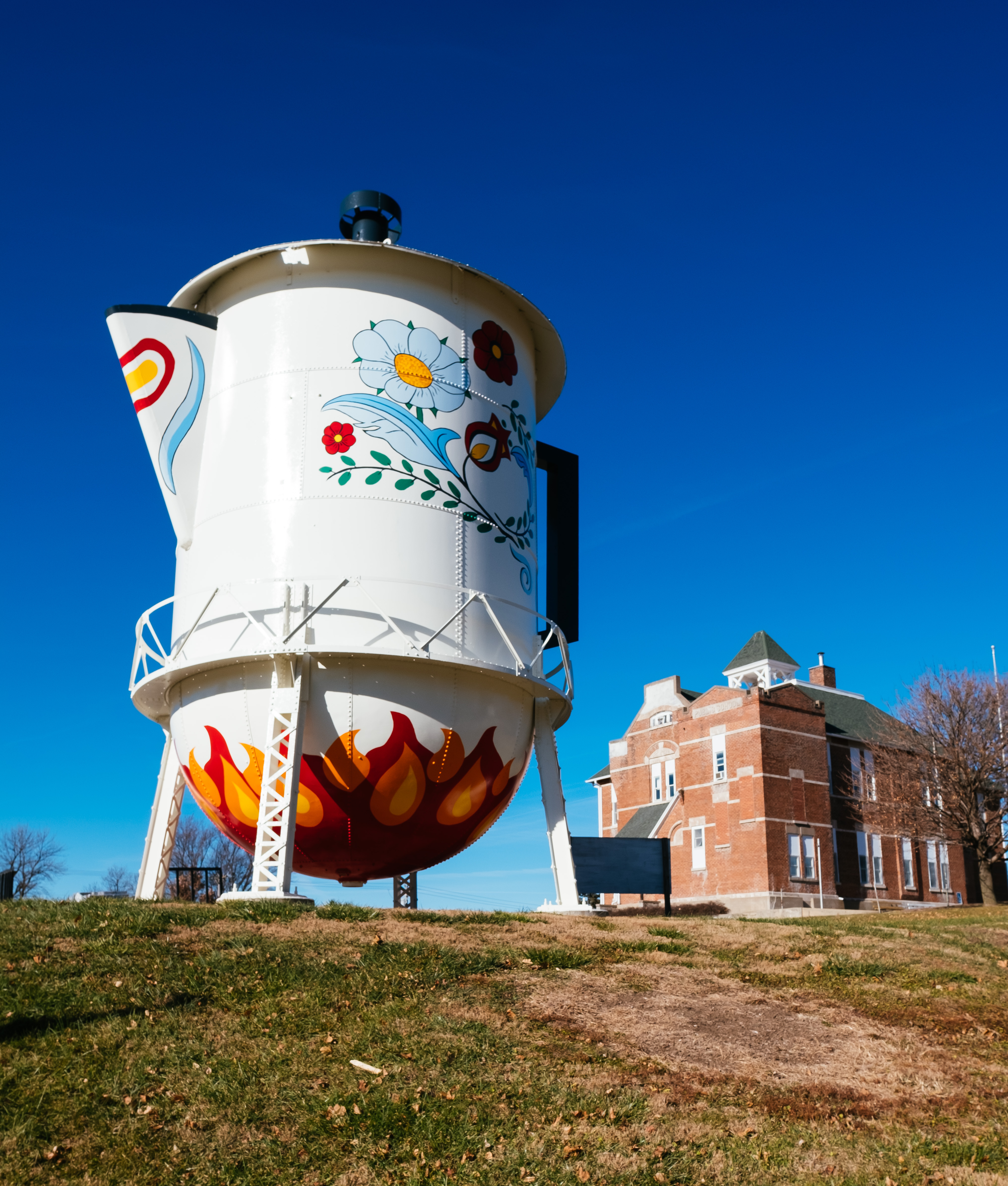
- The largest Swedish coffee pot in the world is located in Stanton (2017)

- Logo
- Nickname: The Little White City
- Location of Stanton, Iowa
- Coordinates: 40°58′54″N 95°6′15″W
- Country: United States
- State: Iowa
- County: Montgomery
- Townships: Scott, Frankfort
- Founded: 1870
- Incorporated: March 12, 1883

Area
  - Total: 0.95 sq mi (2.46 km^{2})
  - Land: 0.95 sq mi (2.46 km^{2})
  - Water: 0 sq mi (0.00 km^{2})
- Elevation: 1,155 ft (352 m)

Population (2020)
  - Total: 678
  - Density: 715.2/sq mi (276.15/km^{2})
- Time zone: UTC-6 (Central (CST))
  - Summer (DST): UTC-5 (CDT)
- ZIP code: 51573
- Area code: 712
- FIPS code: 19-75000
- GNIS feature ID: 0461955
- Website: stantoniowa.com

Stanton is a city in Montgomery County, Iowa, United States. It is located just south of US 34. The population was 678 at the time of the 2020 census.

== History ==
Stanton was laid out in 1870 and incorporated in 1883.

Stanton was first settled by Swedish immigrants. Stanton is best known for its two water towers, the tanks of which are painted and shaped like a giant coffee pot and coffee cup (billed as "the largest Swedish coffee pot in the world"). These also allude to the fact that Stanton is the hometown of actress Virginia Christine, best known to television viewers as "Mrs. Olsen" in classic commercials for Folgers.

== Geography ==
According to the United States Census Bureau, the city has a total area of 0.92 square miles (2.38 km^{2}), all land.

== Demographics ==
Historical populations
| Year | Pop. | ±% |
|---|---|---|
| 1880 | 247 | — |
| 1890 | 399 | +61.5% |
| 1900 | 404 | +1.3% |
| 1910 | 653 | +61.6% |
| 1920 | 749 | +14.7% |
| 1930 | 607 | −19.0% |
| 1940 | 571 | −5.9% |
| 1950 | 570 | −0.2% |
| 1960 | 514 | −9.8% |
| 1970 | 574 | +11.7% |
| 1980 | 747 | +30.1% |
| 1990 | 692 | −7.4% |
| 2000 | 714 | +3.2% |
| 2010 | 689 | −3.5% |
| 2020 | 678 | −1.6% |
Source:"U.S. Census website". United States Census Bureau. and Iowa Data Center; Source: U.S. Decennial Census

=== 2020 census ===
As of the census of 2020, there were 678 people, 270 households, and 183 families residing in the city. The population density was 715.2 inhabitants per square mile (276.2/km^{2}). There were 291 housing units at an average density of 307.0 per square mile (118.5/km^{2}). The racial makeup of the city was 95.9% White, 0.1% Black or African American, 0.1% Native American, 0.0% Asian, 0.0% Pacific Islander, 0.0% from other races and 3.8% from two or more races. Hispanic or Latino persons of any race comprised 0.9% of the population.

Of the 270 households, 23.3% of which had children under the age of 18 living with them, 56.7% were married couples living together, 6.3% were cohabitating couples, 23.0% had a female householder with no spouse or partner present and 14.1% had a male householder with no spouse or partner present. 32.2% of all households were non-families. 28.1% of all households were made up of individuals, 15.9% had someone living alone who was 65 years old or older.

The median age in the city was 50.6 years. 24.0% of the residents were under the age of 20; 3.2% were between the ages of 20 and 24; 17.7% were from 25 and 44; 26.3% were from 45 and 64; and 28.8% were 65 years of age or older. The gender makeup of the city was 47.5% male and 52.5% female.

=== 2010 census ===
At the 2010 census there were 689 people in 268 households, including 190 families, in the city. The population density was 748.9 inhabitants per square mile (289.2/km^{2}). There were 299 housing units at an average density of 325.0 per square mile (125.5/km^{2}). The racial makup of the city was 99.9% White and 0.1% from two or more races. Hispanic or Latino of any race were 0.1%.

Of the 268 households 28.4% had children under the age of 18 living with them, 62.3% were married couples living together, 5.2% had a female householder with no husband present, 3.4% had a male householder with no wife present, and 29.1% were non-families. 25.7% of households were one person and 13.1% were one person aged 65 or older. The average household size was 2.39 and the average family size was 2.84.

The median age was 48.7 years. 21.6% of residents were under the age of 18; 4% were between the ages of 18 and 24; 18.9% were from 25 to 44; 30.1% were from 45 to 64; and 25.3% were 65 or older. The gender makeup of the city was 44.0% male and 56.0% female.

=== 2000 census ===
At the 2000 census there were 714 people in 271 households, including 188 families, in the city. The population density was 803.9 inhabitants per square mile (310.4/km^{2}). There were 285 housing units at an average density of 320.9 per square mile (123.9/km^{2}). The racial makup of the city was 98.7% White, 0.6% Native American, 0.1% Asian, 0.3% from other races, and 0.3% from two or more races. Hispanic or Latino of any race were 0.6%.

Of the 271 households 35.4% had children under the age of 18 living with them, 62.0% were married couples living together, 4.8% had a female householder with no husband present, and 30.3% were non-families. 28.0% of households were one person and 15.1% were one person aged 65 or older. The average household size was 2.46 and the average family size was 3.01.

26.3% are under the age of 18, 4.5% from 18 to 24, 26.6% from 25 to 44, 19.3% from 45 to 64, and 23.2% 65 or older. The median age was 41 years. For every 100 females, there were 85.5 males. For every 100 females age 18 and over, there were 78.3 males.

The median household income was $36,607 and the median family income was $46,136. Males had a median income of $30,625 versus $20,852 for females. The per capita income for the city was $15,628. About 3.7% of families and 6.1% of the population were below the poverty line, including 4.4% of those under age 18 and 4.2% of those age 65 or over.

== Education ==
Stanton Community School District operates public schools.

== Notable people ==
- Virginia Christine, film actress, was born in Stanton.
- Joni Ernst, member of the United States Senate
