= Coburg, Iowa =

- City
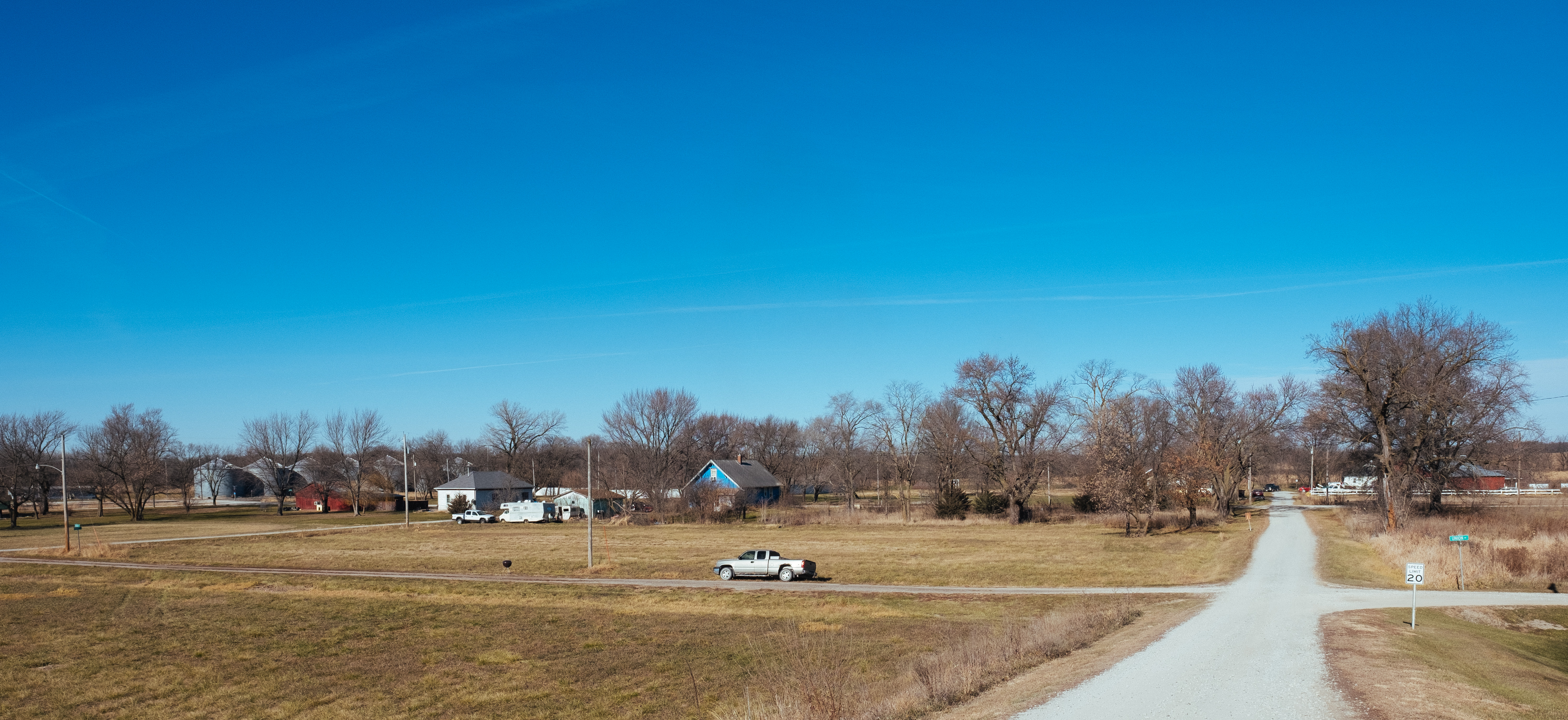
- Buildings in Coburg

- Location of Coburg, Iowa
- Coordinates: 40°55′07″N 95°15′56″W
- Country: United States
- State: Iowa
- County: Montgomery
- Township: Grant

Area
  - Total: 0.29 sq mi (0.75 km^{2})
  - Land: 0.29 sq mi (0.75 km^{2})
  - Water: 0 sq mi (0.00 km^{2})
- Elevation: 1,004 ft (306 m)

Population (2020)
  - Total: 26
  - Density: 90.3/sq mi (34.86/km^{2})
- Time zone: UTC-6 (Central (CST))
  - Summer (DST): UTC-5 (CDT)
- ZIP code: 51566
- Area code: 712
- FIPS code: 19-14880
- GNIS feature ID: 2393582

Coburg is a city in Grant Township, Montgomery County, Iowa, United States. The population was 26 at the 2020 census.

== History ==
Coburg got its start following construction of the railroad through the territory.

== Geography ==
According to the United States Census Bureau, the city has a total area of 0.29 square miles (0.75 km^{2}), all land.

== Demographics ==
Historical populations
Year	Pop.	±%
1880	83	—
1890	60	−27.7%
1900	164	+173.3%
1910	177	+7.9%
1920	170	−4.0%
1930	200	+17.6%
1940	162	−19.0%
1950	83	−48.8%
1960	54	−34.9%
1970	36	−33.3%
1980	52	+44.4%
1990	58	+11.5%
2000	31	−46.6%
2010	42	+35.5%
2020	26	−38.1%
Source:"U.S. Census website". United States Census Bureau. and Iowa Data Center; Source: U.S. Decennial Census

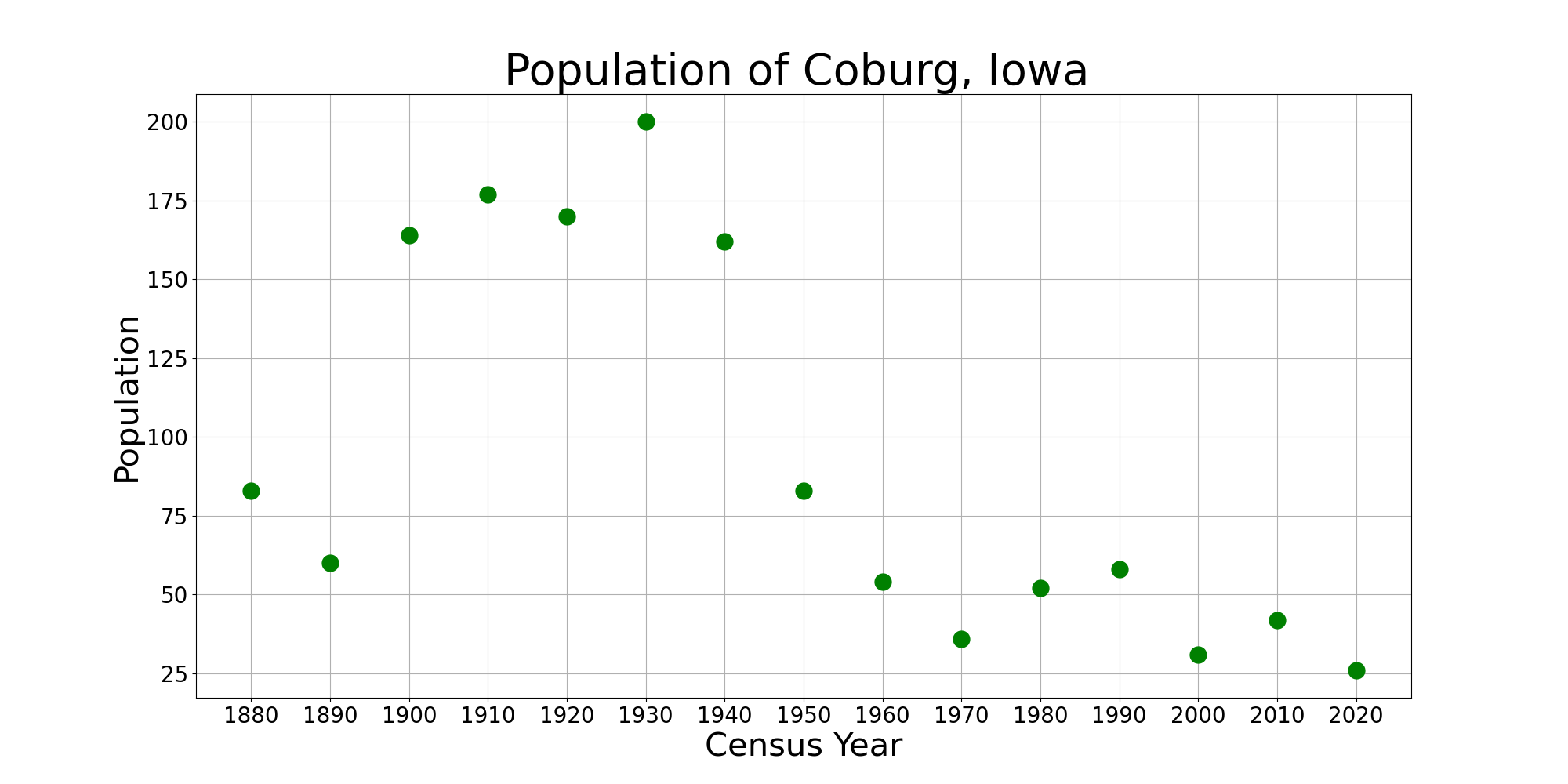
The population of Coburg, Iowa from US census data

=== 2020 census ===
As of the census of 2020, there were 26 people, 12 households, and 9 families residing in the city. The population density was 90.3 inhabitants per square mile (34.9/km^{2}). There were 12 housing units at an average density of 41.7 per square mile (16.1/km^{2}). The racial makeup of the city was 96.2% White, 0.0% Black or African American, 0.0% Native American, 0.0% Asian, 0.0% Pacific Islander, 0.0% from other races and 3.8% from two or more races. Hispanic or Latino persons of any race comprised 0.0% of the population.

Of the 12 households, 25.0% of which had children under the age of 18 living with them, 33.3% were married couples living together, 25.0% were cohabitating couples, 25.0% had a female householder with no spouse or partner present and 16.7% had a male householder with no spouse or partner present. 25.0% of all households were non-families. 25.0% of all households were made up of individuals, 16.7% had someone living alone who was 65 years old or older.

The median age in the city was 39.5 years. 15.4% of the residents were under the age of 20; 3.8% were between the ages of 20 and 24; 42.3% were from 25 and 44; 23.1% were from 45 and 64; and 15.4% were 65 years of age or older. The gender makeup of the city was 53.8% male and 46.2% female.

=== 2010 census ===
As of the census of 2010, there were 42 people, 13 households, and 12 families residing in the city. The population density was 144.8 inhabitants per square mile (55.9/km^{2}). There were 13 housing units at an average density of 44.8 per square mile (17.3/km^{2}). The racial makeup of the city was 95.2% White and 4.8% from two or more races.

There were 13 households, of which 38.5% had children under the age of 18 living with them, 53.8% were married couples living together, 15.4% had a female householder with no husband present, 23.1% had a male householder with no wife present, and 7.7% were non-families. 0.0% of all households were made up of individuals. The average household size was 3.23 and the average family size was 2.92.

The median age in the city was 30 years. 31% of residents were under the age of 18; 16.5% were between the ages of 18 and 24; 19.1% were from 25 to 44; 26.2% were from 45 to 64; and 7.1% were 65 years of age or older. The gender makeup of the city was 54.8% male and 45.2% female.

=== 2000 census ===
As of the census of 2000, there were 31 people, 12 households, and 9 families residing in the city. The population density was 106.9 inhabitants per square mile (41.3/km^{2}). There were 14 housing units at an average density of 48.3 per square mile (18.6/km^{2}). The racial makeup of the city was 100.00% White.

There were 12 households, out of which 50.0% had children under the age of 18 living with them, 66.7% were married couples living together, and 16.7% were non-families. 16.7% of all households were made up of individuals, and none had someone living alone who was 65 years of age or older. The average household size was 2.58 and the average family size was 2.90.

In the city, the population was spread out, with 35.5% under the age of 18, 29.0% from 25 to 44, 35.5% from 45 to 64, . The median age was 32 years. For every 100 females, there were 72.2 males. For every 100 females age 18 and over, there were 122.2 males.

The median income for a household in the city was $33,750, and the median income for a family was $31,875. Males had a median income of $28,750 versus $19,375 for females. The per capita income for the city was $10,329. There were 11.1% of families and 21.2% of the population living below the poverty line, including 35.3% of under eighteens and none of those over 64.

== Education ==
The Red Oak Community School District operates local area public schools.
