= USS LST-543 =

1944 LST-542-class tank landing ship

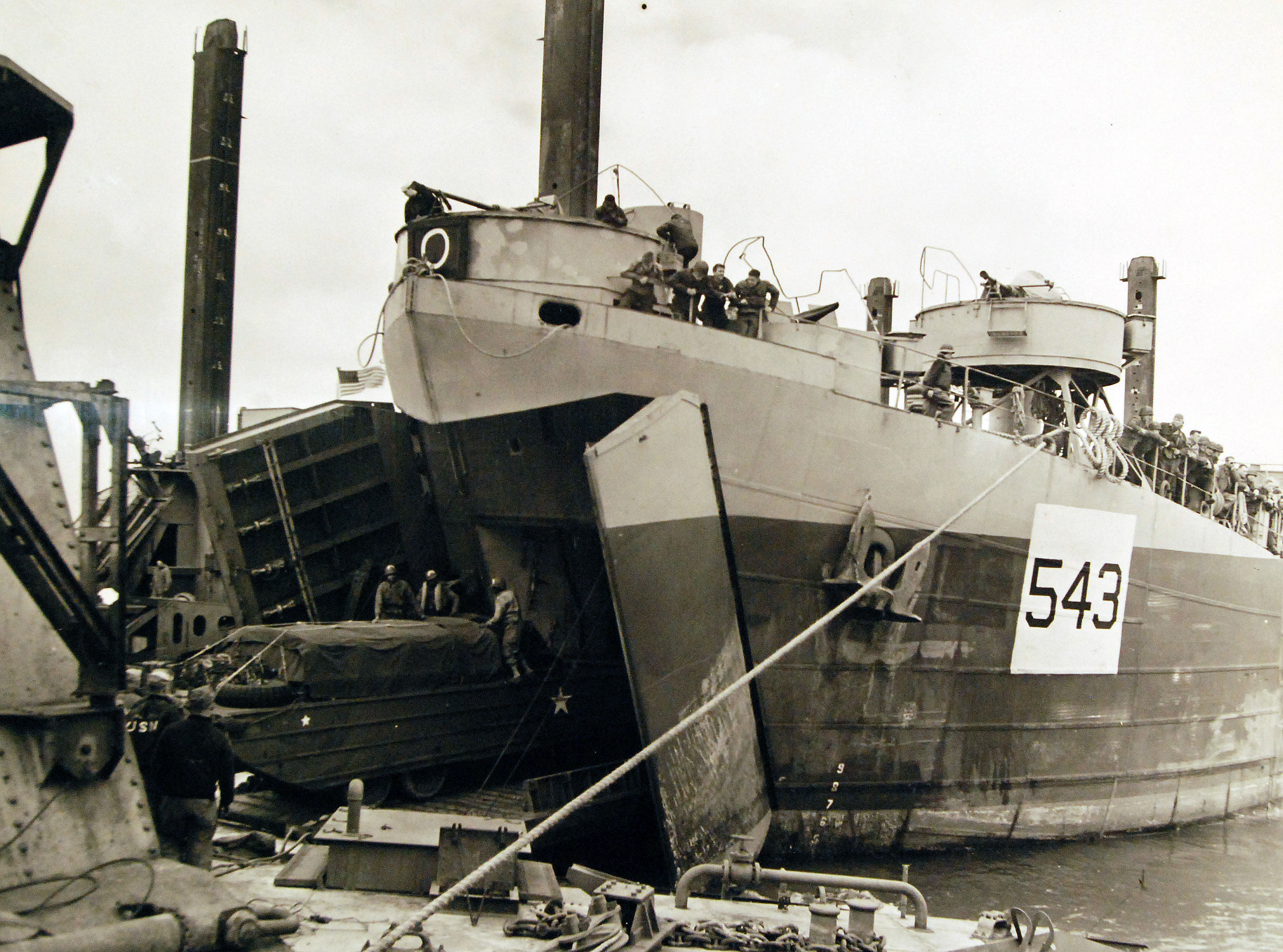
- LST-543 unloading at Mulberry off Normandy, France

History

United States
- Name: USS LST-543
- Builder: Missouri Valley Bridge and Iron Company, Evansville, Indiana
- Laid down: 6 December 1943
- Launched: 1 February 1944
- Sponsored by: Lieutenant, junior grade, Helen C. Hanson, USNR
- Commissioned: 6 March 1944
- Decommissioned: 31 May 1946
- Stricken: 17 July 1947
- Honours and awards: 2 battle stars for World War II
- Fate: Sold 5 December 1947

General characteristics
- Class & type: LST-542-class tank landing ship
- Displacement: 1,490 long tons (1,514 t) light; 4,080 long tons (4,145 t) full
- Length: 328 ft (100 m)
- Beam: 50 ft (15 m)
- Draft: Unloaded 2 ft 4 in (0.71 m) bow; 7 ft 6 in (2.29 m) stern; Full load: 8 ft 2 in (2.49 m) forward; 14 ft 1 in (4.29 m) aft
- Propulsion: Two General Motors 12-567 diesel engines, two shafts, twin rudders
- Speed: 12 knots (22 km/h; 14 mph)
- Boats & landing craft carried: 2 x LCVPs
- Troops: 140 officers and enlisted men
- Complement: 8-10 officers, 100-115 enlisted men
- Armament: 1 × single 3 in (76 mm) 50-caliber gun mount; 8 × 40 mm guns; 12 × 20 mm guns

USS LST-543 was a United States Navy LST-542-class tank landing ship in commission from 1944 to 1946.

== Construction and commissioning ==
LST-543 was laid down on 6 December 1943 at Evansville, Indiana, by the Missouri Valley Bridge and Iron Company. She was launched on 1 February 1944, sponsored by Lieutenant, junior grade, Helen C. Hanson, USNR, and commissioned on 6 March 1944.

== Service history ==
During World War II, LST-543 initially was assigned to the European Theater of Operations and participated in Operation Overlord, the invasion of Normandy, in June 1944.

LST-543 then was assigned to the Pacific Theater of Operations and took part in the assault on and occupation of Okinawa in May and June 1945.

Following the war, LST-543 performed occupation duty in the Far East and saw service in China until early May 1946, when she returned to the United States.

== Decommissioning and disposal ==
LST-543 was decommissioned on 31 May 1946 and stricken from the Navy List on 17 July 1947. She was sold to Bosey in the Philippines on 5 December 1947.

== Honors and awards ==
LST-543 earned two battle stars for World War II service.
