= West Township, Montgomery County, Iowa =

Township in Montgomery County, Iowa, U.S.

Coordinates: 40.944°N 95.328°W

West Township is a township in Montgomery County, Iowa, USA.

== History ==
West Township was created in 1854.
