= Lincoln Township, Montgomery County, Iowa =

Township in Montgomery County, Iowa, U.S.

Coordinates: 41.116°N 95.327°W

Lincoln Township is a township in Montgomery County, Iowa, USA.

== History ==
Lincoln Township was created in 1868.
