= Grant, Iowa =

- City
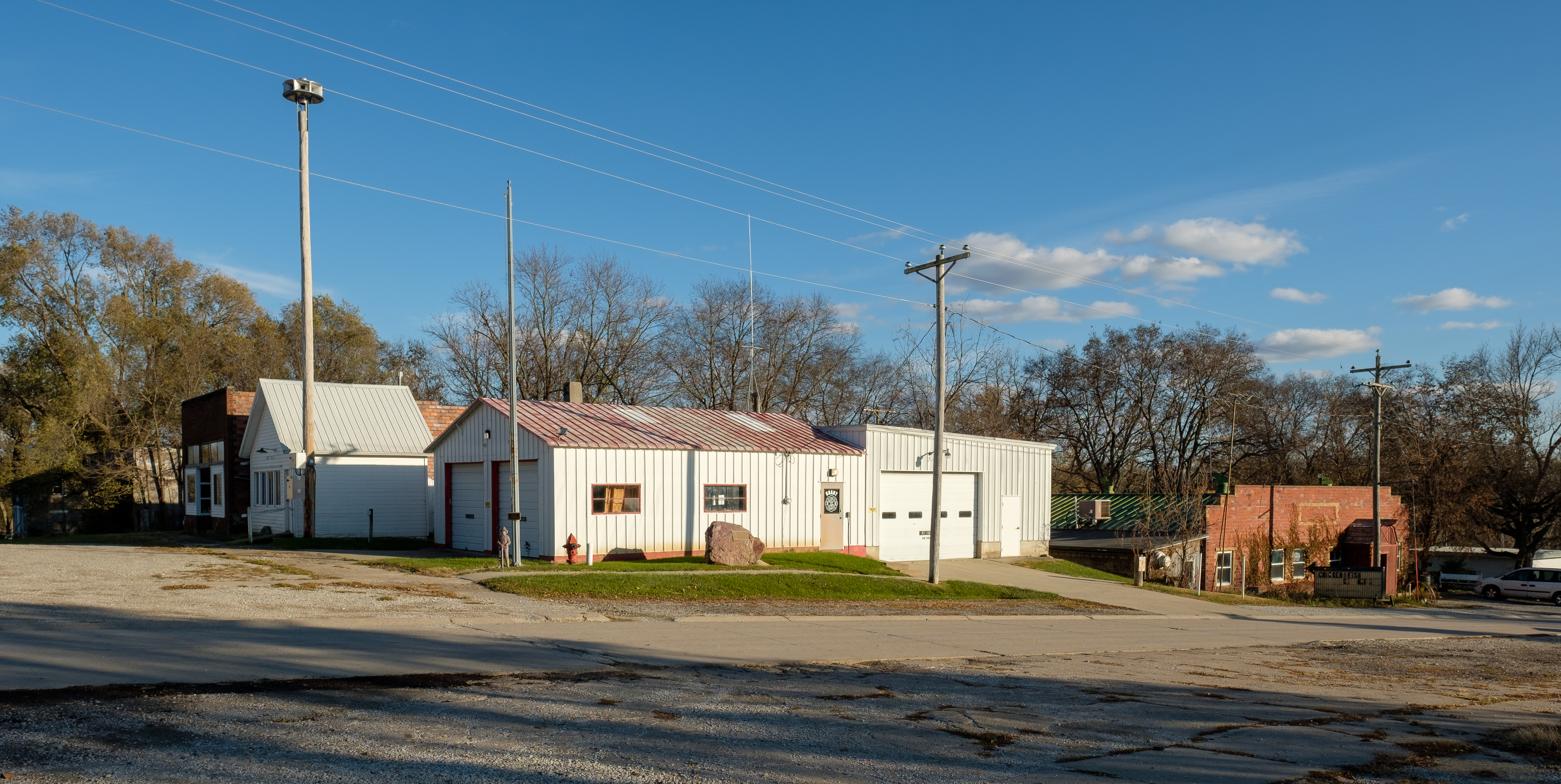
- Downtown Grant

- Location of Grant, Iowa
- Coordinates: 41°08′34″N 94°59′05″W
- Country: United States
- State: Iowa
- County: Montgomery
- Township: Douglas
- Incorporated: February 27, 1912

Area
  - Total: 0.75 sq mi (1.93 km^{2})
  - Land: 0.73 sq mi (1.90 km^{2})
  - Water: 0.012 sq mi (0.03 km^{2})
- Elevation: 1,148 ft (350 m)

Population (2020)
  - Total: 86
  - Density: 117.1/sq mi (45.23/km^{2})
- Time zone: UTC-6 (Central (CST))
  - Summer (DST): UTC-5 (CDT)
- ZIP code: 50847
- Area code: 712
- FIPS code: 19-32295
- GNIS feature ID: 2394964

Grant is a city in Douglas Township, Montgomery County, Iowa, United States. The population was 86 at the time of the 2020 census.

== History ==
Grant is named for Ulysses S. Grant, 18th President of the United States. Its commercial district, which was developed from 1871 to 1952, was listed on the National Register of Historic Places in 2002.

Grant was incorporated as a city on February 27, 1912.

== Geography ==
According to the United States Census Bureau, the city has a total area of 0.75 square miles (1.94 km^{2}), of which 0.74 square miles (1.92 km^{2}) is land and 0.01 square miles (0.03 km^{2}) is water.

== Demographics ==
Historical populations
Year	Pop.	±%
1900	249	—
1910	177	−28.9%
1920	282	+59.3%
1930	242	−14.2%
1940	231	−4.5%
1950	237	+2.6%
1960	180	−24.1%
1970	152	−15.6%
1980	143	−5.9%
1990	123	−14.0%
2000	102	−17.1%
2010	92	−9.8%
2020	86	−6.5%
Source:"U.S. Census website". United States Census Bureau. and Iowa Data Center; Source: U.S. Decennial Census

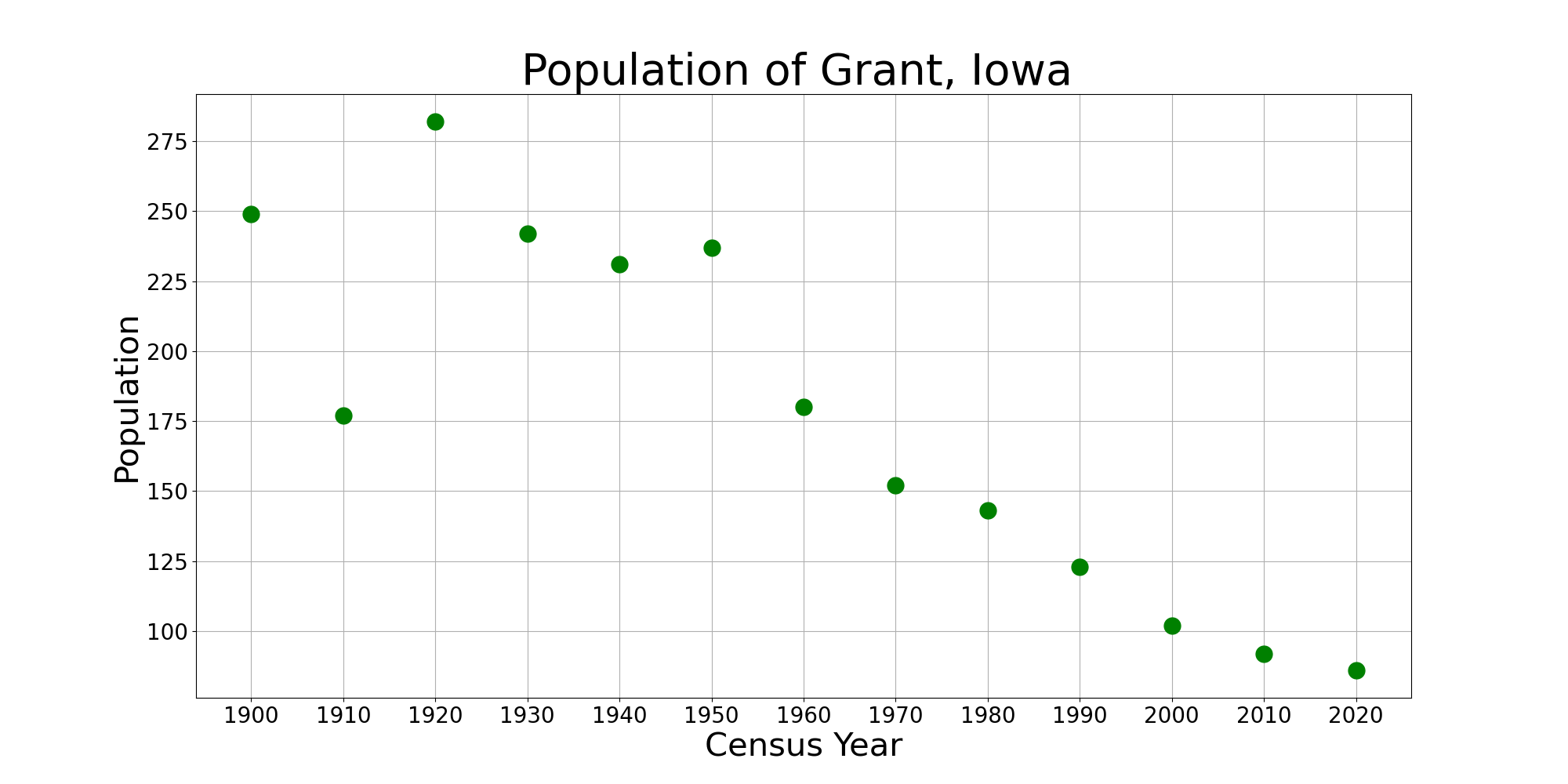
The population of Grant, Iowa from US census data

=== 2020 census ===
As of the census of 2020, there were 86 people, 41 households, and 27 families residing in the city. The population density was 117.1 inhabitants per square mile (45.2/km^{2}). There were 42 housing units at an average density of 57.2 per square mile (22.1/km^{2}). The racial makeup of the city was 96.5% White, 0.0% Black or African American, 0.0% Native American, 0.0% Asian, 0.0% Pacific Islander, 0.0% from other races and 3.5% from two or more races. Hispanic or Latino persons of any race comprised 0.0% of the population.

Of the 41 households, 36.6% of which had children under the age of 18 living with them, 34.1% were married couples living together, 17.1% were cohabitating couples, 24.4% had a female householder with no spouse or partner present and 24.4% had a male householder with no spouse or partner present. 34.1% of all households were non-families. 26.8% of all households were made up of individuals, 14.6% had someone living alone who was 65 years old or older.

The median age in the city was 42.0 years. 17.4% of the residents were under the age of 20; 9.3% were between the ages of 20 and 24; 30.2% were from 25 and 44; 14.0% were from 45 and 64; and 29.1% were 65 years of age or older. The gender makeup of the city was 48.8% male and 51.2% female.

=== 2010 census ===
As of the census of 2010, there were 92 people, 41 households, and 27 families living in the city. The population density was 124.3 inhabitants per square mile (48.0/km^{2}). There were 54 housing units at an average density of 73.0 per square mile (28.2/km^{2}). The racial makeup of the city was 100.0% White.

There were 41 households, of which 17.1% had children under the age of 18 living with them, 58.5% were married couples living together, 7.3% had a female householder with no husband present, and 34.1% were non-families. 19.5% of all households were made up of individuals, and 7.3% had someone living alone who was 65 years of age or older. The average household size was 2.24 and the average family size was 2.59.

The median age in the city was 52 years. 13% of residents were under the age of 18; 4.4% were between the ages of 18 and 24; 21.8% were from 25 to 44; 35.9% were from 45 to 64; and 25% were 65 years of age or older. The gender makeup of the city was 50.0% male and 50.0% female.

=== 2000 census ===
As of the census of 2000, there were 102 people, 46 households, and 32 families living in the city. The population density was 137.3 inhabitants per square mile (53.0/km^{2}). There were 60 housing units at an average density of 80.8 per square mile (31.2/km^{2}). The racial makeup of the city was 97.06% White, 0.98% African American, 0.98% Native American, and 0.98% from two or more races.

There were 46 households, out of which 21.7% had children under the age of 18 living with them, 63.0% were married couples living together, 4.3% had a female householder with no husband present, and 30.4% were non-families. 30.4% of all households were made up of individuals, and 17.4% had someone living alone who was 65 years of age or older. The average household size was 2.22 and the average family size was 2.69.

In the city, the population was spread out, with 17.6% under the age of 18, 5.9% from 18 to 24, 26.5% from 25 to 44, 29.4% from 45 to 64, and 20.6% who were 65 years of age or older. The median age was 44 years. For every 100 females, there were 108.2 males. For every 100 females age 18 and over, there were 100.0 males.

The median income for a household in the city was $21,806, and the median income for a family was $42,917. Males had a median income of $20,625 versus $36,250 for females. The per capita income for the city was $16,461. There were no families and 10.8% of the population living below the poverty line, including no under eighteens and none of those over 64.

== Education ==
The Griswold Community School District operates area public schools.
