= Labo Del Rio Bridge =

- U.S. National Register of Historic Places
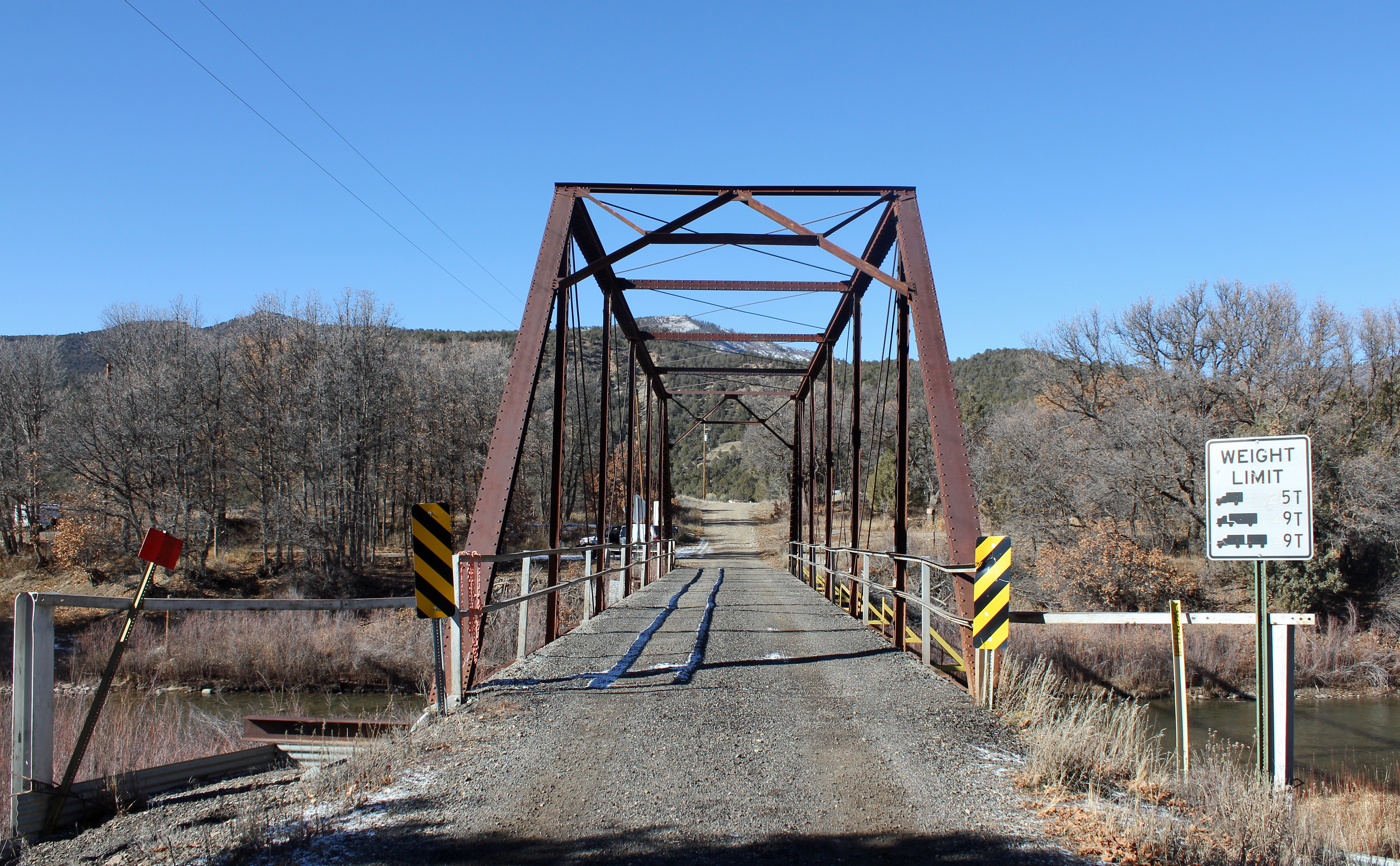
- The bridge in late 2014.

- Location within Colorado Location within the United States
- Location: County Road F40 over the Piedra River
- Nearest city: Arboles, Colorado
- Coordinates: 37°4′33″N 107°24′17″W
- Built: 1913
- Built by: Missouri Valley Bridge Company
- Architectural style: Pratt through truss
- MPS: Vehicular Bridges in Colorado TR
- NRHP reference No.: 85001399
- Added to NRHP: June 24, 1985

The Labo Del Rio Bridge, over the Piedra River near Arboles, Colorado, was designed and built in 1913 by the Missouri Valley Bridge Company with steel by the Illinois Steel Company. It is a Pratt through truss bridge. It has also been known as Bridge over Piedra River. The bridge cost the state $3,395. It was listed on the National Register of Historic Places in 1985.

It was deemed significant as the oldest surviving roadway truss bridge over the Piedra River, as one of few surviving in the state built by the Missouri Valley Bridge Company, and as the oldest known through truss made for the State Highway Commission. It is a six-truss bridge with an interesting, transitional type of pin-/rivet- connection.

It first carried State Primary Road 15 in a crossing near Pagosa Springs; it was moved later to cross the Piedra River at its current location, on the Southern Ute Indian Reservation in the southern part of Archuleta County.
