= 19th Street Bridge =

Truss bridge in Denver, Colorado

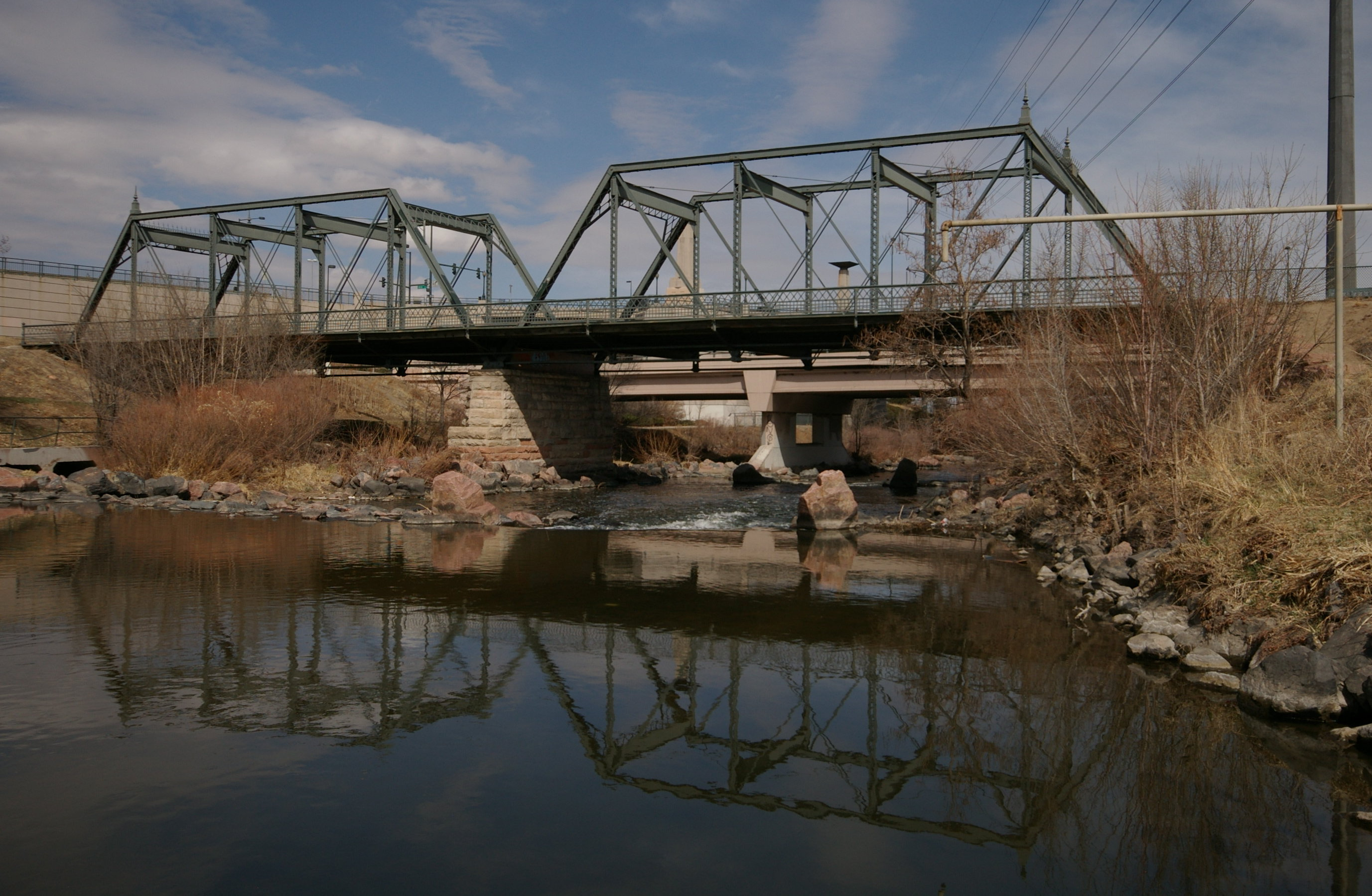
- Coordinates: 39.7598°N 105.0041°W
- Carries: Pedestrians
- Crosses: South Platte River

Characteristics
- Design: 2-span Pratt Through Truss
- Total length: 206 feet (63 m)
- Width: 22.5 feet (6.9 m) (roadway)
- Height: 19 feet (5.8 m)
- Longest span: 101 feet (31 m)
- No. of spans: 2

History
- Designer: Missouri Valley Bridge & Iron Co.
- Construction end: 1888
- Construction cost: $25,000

Statistics
- 19th Street Bridge
- U.S. National Register of Historic Places
- Colorado State Register of Historic Properties
- Location within Colorado Location within the United States
- Location: 19th St., Denver, Colorado
- Coordinates: 39.7598°N 105.0041°W
- MPS: Vehicular Bridges in Colorado TR
- NRHP reference No.: 85000201
- CSRHP No.: 5DV.535
- Added to NRHP: February 4, 1985

Location
- Interactive map of 19th Street Bridge

The 19th Street Bridge is a two-span through Pratt truss road bridge in Denver, Colorado, over the South Platte River, now used for pedestrians. It was built in 1888 to replace a wooden structure and carried automobile traffic until 1986. The bridge is listed on the National Register of Historic Places.

== History ==
A number of bridges were built across the South Platte River beginning in 1859, and by 1875, there was interest in a bridge to span the river at the 19th Street location. In 1876, a wooden bridge was constructed at the site. This previous bridge was closed to traffic in 1884 after it was damaged in a flood. Because of repeated floods destroying numerous wooden bridges, the city of Denver sought to replace them with metal structures. By 1887, because of their ready availability and low expense, the city began building metal bridges to replace the wooden spans. On August 26, 1887, the Missouri Valley Bridge and Iron Works was contracted to build the 19th Street Bridge. The structure cost $25,000, including $8,250 for 120 feet (37 m) of iron. Construction on the new span was complete in 1888.

Around 1898, a plan surfaced to rebuild the bridge as a viaduct so that it would not cross only the river, but also the rail switching yard. However, the plan was defeated in June 1904. The bridge has remained mostly unmodified since construction. Timber decking was replaced with corrugated steel following a 1961 flood and some bent hinges were replaced as a result of a 1965 flood. (Note: During the 1965 flood, sixteen bridges in Denver were destroyed.) The 19th Street Bridge was listed on the National Register of Historic Places on February 4, 1985.

Because of repeated wear and deterioration caused by salt for melting ice, the bridge was restricted to pedestrians and bicycles beginning on December 16, 1986. Following the closure, a new vehicular bridge was planned downstream (to the northeast), tentatively referred to as the "Nineteen and A-Half Street Bridge"; it was built in 1992.

Aside from serving as a pedestrian bridge, the structure has hosted the annual "Gala on the Bridge", a fundraiser for The Greenway Foundation. It began in 2011, and was described in The Denver Post as the "first time the bridge has been used for anything other than a way for people to cross the South Platte River".

In the state of Colorado, at the time of its NRHP nomination, the 19th Street Bridge was described as the oldest surviving wrought iron bridge, oldest vehicular bridge at its original location, and oldest vehicular bridge still in public use.

== Design ==
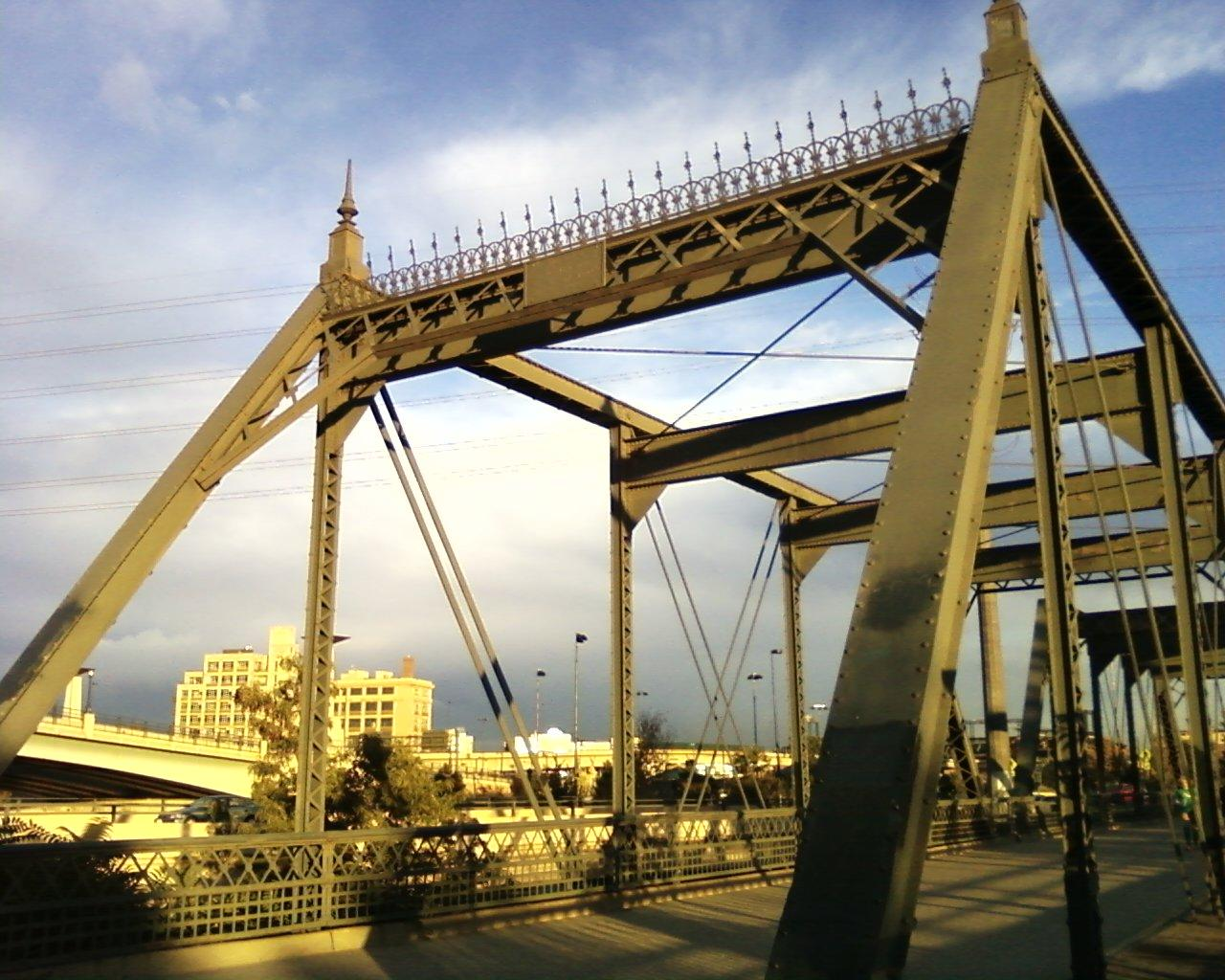
Detail of one end of the bridge, showing the ornamental crests and finials (in 2008)

The bridge's two spans have a through Pratt truss design, each with five panels. The structure is about 200 feet (61 m) long with a roadway about 22.5 feet (6.9 m) wide. The roadbed is concrete on corrugated metal, replacing the original wood decking. The structural members are made of wrought iron and are pin-connected. The top chords are horizontal, and the upper struts are "unusually deep" I-beams. Sidewalks, decorated with iron newels and latticework, cantilever off both sides of the bridge. The south sidewalk permits pedestrians, while the north one has no deck and carries utility lines. The bridge is supported by ashlar piers of solid stone. The latticed portals feature decorative cast iron crests and finials, and a plaque with the builder's inscription. The bridge is described by History Colorado as one of the most ornamental in Colorado.

== See also ==
- List of bridges documented by the Historic American Engineering Record in Colorado
- List of bridges on the National Register of Historic Places in Colorado
- National Register of Historic Places listings in downtown Denver, Colorado
- National Register of Historic Places listings in West Denver, Colorado
