= Grant Commercial Historic District (Grant, Iowa) =

Historic district in Iowa, United States

- U.S. National Register of Historic Places
- U.S. Historic district
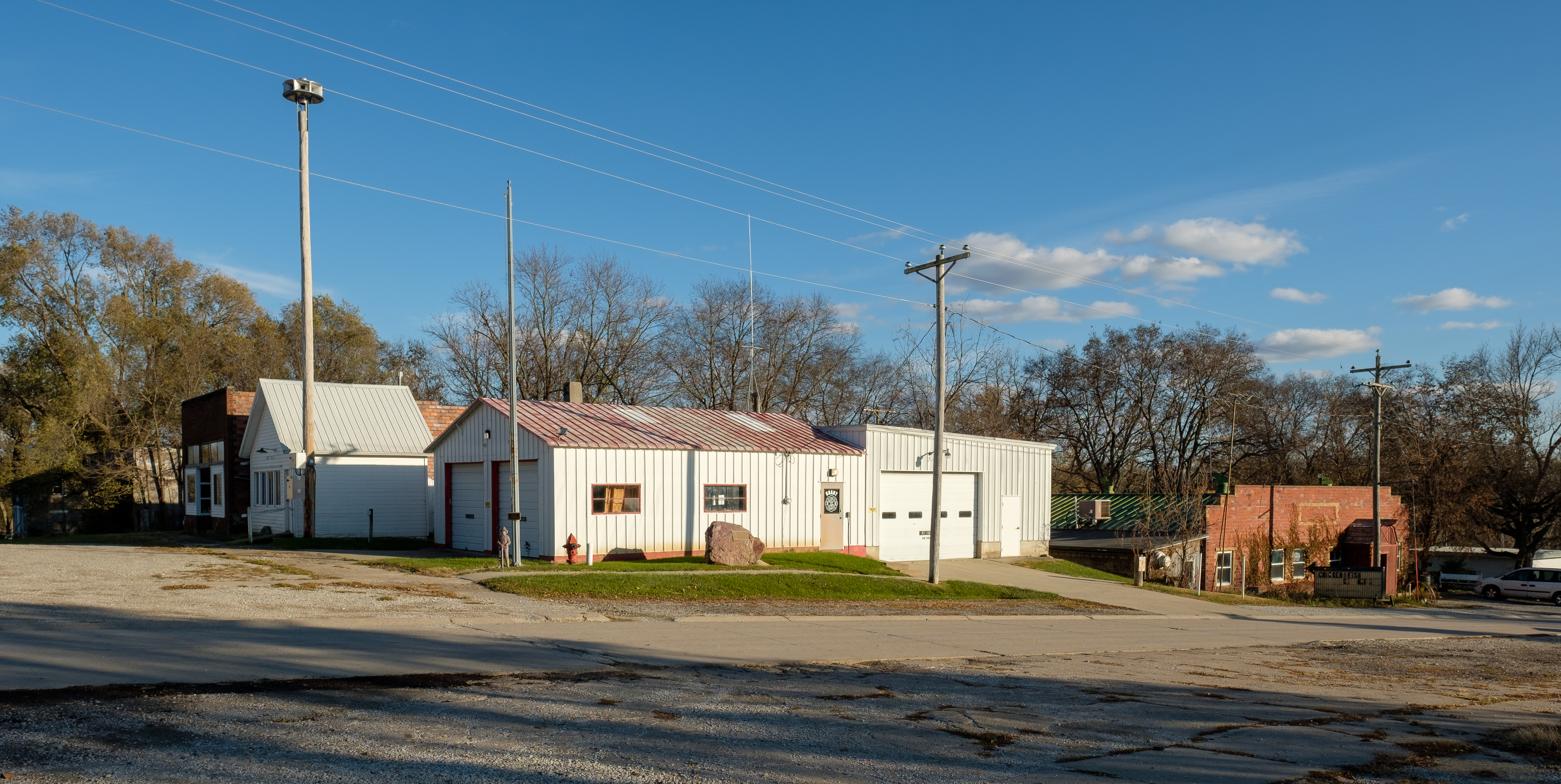

- Location within Iowa Location within the United States
- Location: Parts of 2nd St. and U Ave., Grant, Iowa
- Coordinates: 41°08′31″N 94°59′03″W
- Area: 5 acres (2.0 ha)
- Architectural style: Italianate; Late 19th & early 20th century Revivals
- MPS: Iowa's Main Street Commercial Architecture MPS
- NRHP reference No.: 02001031
- Added to NRHP: September 12, 2002

The Grant Commercial Historic District is a nationally recognized historic district located in Grant, Iowa, United States. It was listed on the National Register of Historic Places in 2002. At the time of its nomination it contained 17 resources, which included 15 contributing buildings, two contributing structures, and one non-contributing building. The historic district covers the town's central business district. Grant is a small town located in northeast Montgomery County in the southwest quadrant of the state. It was plated in 1858, and it was known as Milford until the early 20th century even though its post office was Grant. While not on a railroad, the town was still able to maintain a viable commercial district.

The district contains a mix of commercial buildings, a fraternal club, a Methodist church, residential and industrial structures. The lone civic building is the non-contributing fire station. There are an unusual number of frame commercial structures, and brick buildings that primarily house automobile-related businesses. Because of this, the district "reflects the growing importance of the automobile as a mode of transportation and its impact on Iowa's Main Streets." Second Street and U Avenue are the contributing structures in the historic district. The period of significance is from 1871 to 1952, and the buildings are constructed during that time frame. Late 19th and early 20th-century revival styles and the Italianate style are dominant.
