= Grant Commercial Historic District (Grant, Nebraska) =

Historic district in Nebraska, United States

- U.S. National Register of Historic Places
- U.S. Historic district
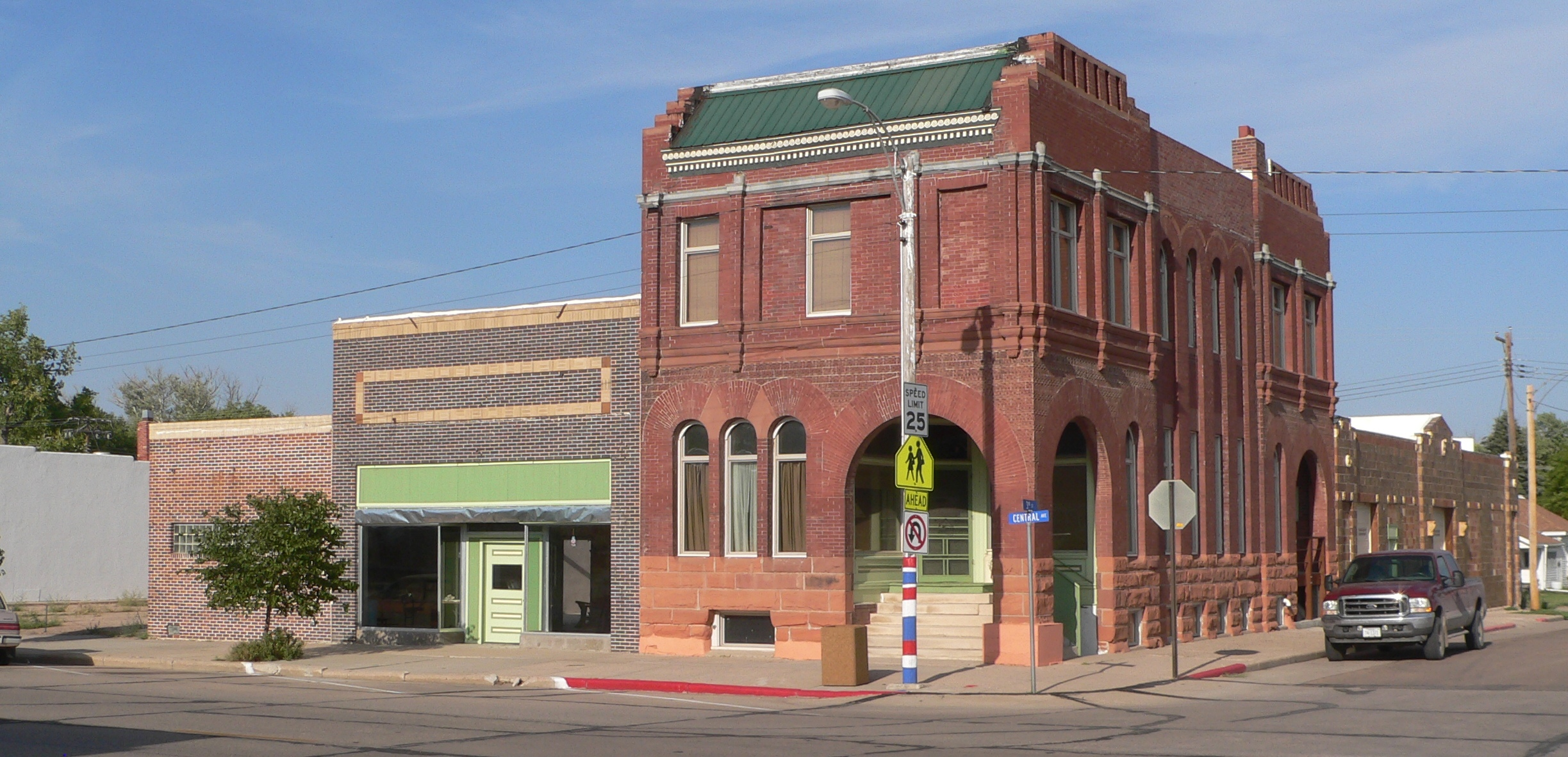
- Buildings at northeast corner of 3rd and Central

- Location within Nebraska Location within the United States
- Location: Roughly, Central Ave. from 1st St. to 4th St., Grant, Nebraska
- Coordinates: 40°50′28″N 101°43′29″W
- Area: 9.5 acres (3.8 ha)
- Architectural style: Classical Revival, Romanesque, Moderne
- NRHP reference No.: 96000025
- Added to NRHP: February 16, 1996

The Grant Commercial Historic District in Grant, Nebraska is a 9.5 acres (3.8 ha) historic district that was listed on the National Register of Historic Places in 1996. It includes 31 contributing buildings and one other contributing structure.

The district also includes six non-contributing buildings, including the IOOF Hall (1954), at 330-332 Central Avenue.
