= Grant Township, Montgomery County, Iowa =

Township in Montgomery County, Iowa, U.S.

Coordinates: 40.9411°N 95.2044°W

Grant Township is a township in Montgomery County, Iowa, USA.

== History ==
Grant Township was formed in 1868.
