= Douglas Township, Montgomery County, Iowa =

Township in Montgomery County, Iowa, U.S.

Coordinates: 41.11°N 94.96°W

Douglas Township is a township in Montgomery County, Iowa, USA.

== History ==
Douglas Township was organized in 1857.
