= Ninth Street Bridge (Boise, Idaho) =

- U.S. National Register of Historic Places
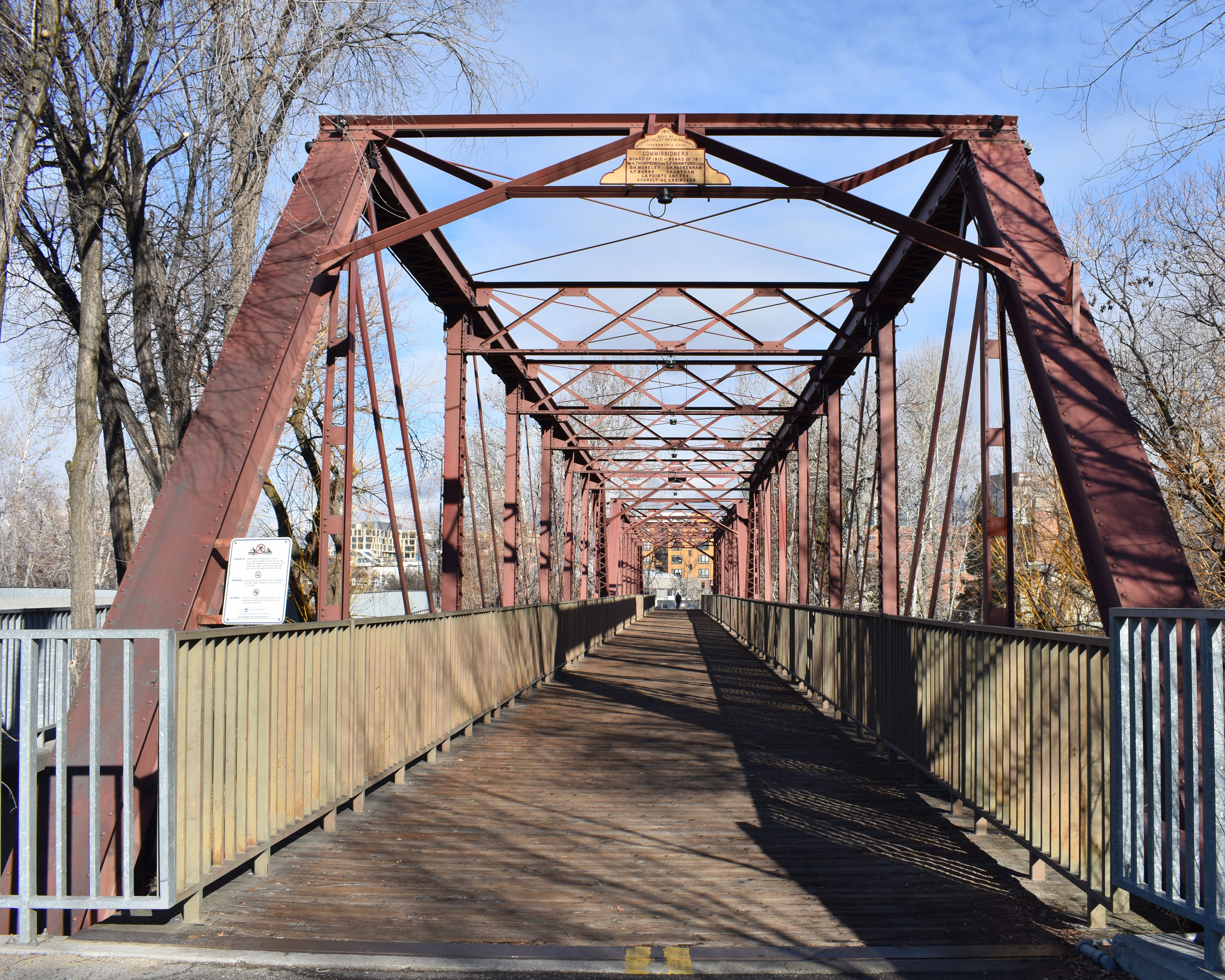
- The Ninth Street Bridge in 2019

- Location within Idaho Location within the United States
- Location: E of new 9th Street bridge, over Boise R., Boise, Idaho
- Coordinates: 43°36′34″N 116°12′29″W
- Area: less than one acre
- Built: 1911
- Built by: Missouri Valley Bridge & Iron Co.
- Architect: Lapointe & Fox
- Architectural style: Pratt Through-truss bridge
- MPS: Metal Truss Highway Bridges of Idaho MPS
- NRHP reference No.: 01000980
- Added to NRHP: September 14, 2001

The Ninth Street Bridge in Boise, Idaho, also known as the Eighth Street Bridge, crosses the Boise River and is a 2-span, pin-connected Pratt through truss design constructed by the Missouri Valley Bridge & Iron Co. and completed in 1911. Each span is 160 ft (49 m) and includes six full panels and two end panels, supported by concrete piers at each end and midway in the river. Laced channel sections with cover plates form the upper chords, with eyebars on the lower chords. Eyebars with turnbuckles form the diagonals. The bridge was added to the National Register of Historic Places in 2001.

== History ==
In 1864 the Board of Commissioners of Boise County, Idaho Territory, granted John McLellan and William Thompson a license to operate a ferry across the Boise River at a point on the Oregon Trail near the current location of the Ninth Street Bridge. The McLellan Ferry operated until 1868, when McLellan and Thompson hired flour mill owner H.P. Isaacs to build the Boise City Bridge.

In 1911 the old Ninth Street Bridge was moved approximately 12 miles to span the Boise River along the Boise and Interurban Railway line at what is now Linder Road in Meridian, and the Missouri Valley Bridge & Iron Co. built the new Ninth Street Bridge. The Boise Railroad Company secured rights to operate a streetcar across the Ninth Street Bridge in November, 1911, and the bridge became part of the South Boise Loop.

In 1912 a 10-pound box of dynamite was left on a pier under the bridge, but police uncovered no plan for demolition.

The middle pier under the bridge was fortified in 1926 with 600 tons of rock to repair damage caused by the Boise River. In 1928 engineers repaired the center pier again after discovering what the Idaho Statesman termed "vast caverns and yawning spaces" in the center support, when the block of concrete was found to be "hanging from the steel work just like a ring from a Spanish dancer's ear lobe."

By the 1960s, engineers had concluded that the truss bridge should be replaced. In 1987 a new Ninth Street Bridge was constructed directly west of the truss bridge, and the old bridge became a route for pedestrian and bicycle traffic.

== See also ==
- Capitol Boulevard Memorial Bridge
