= Scott Township, Montgomery County, Iowa =

Township in Montgomery County, Iowa, U.S.

Coordinates: 40.944°N 95.099°W

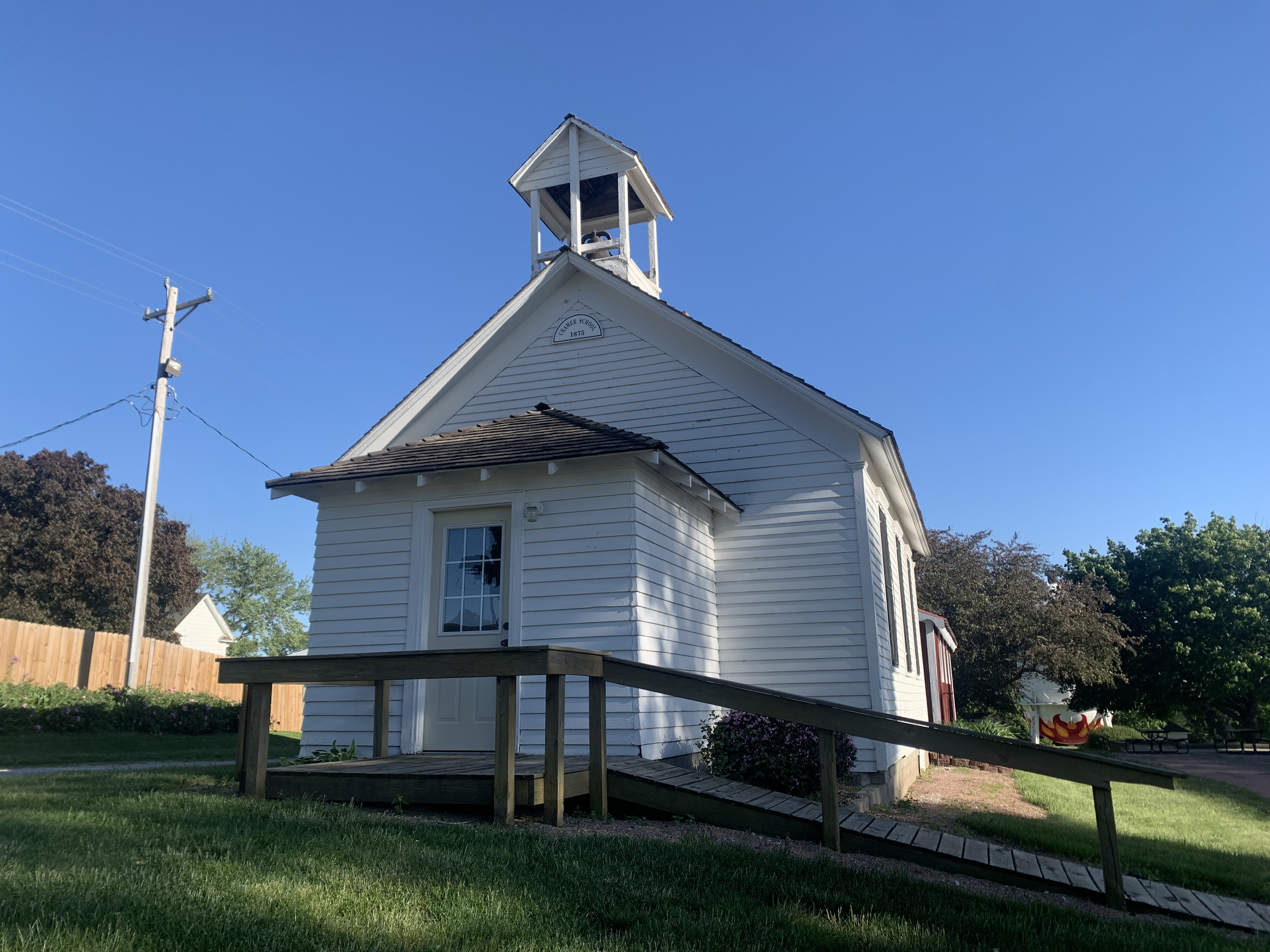
Cramer School removed to Stanton, Iowa

Scott Township is a township in Montgomery County, Iowa, USA.

It has an elevation of 380 meters.

It had a population of 1089 in 2020.

== History ==
Scott Township was established in 1870. It was first called Stanton Township, but the name was soon changed.
