= Montgomery County, Iowa =

County in Iowa, United States

- County
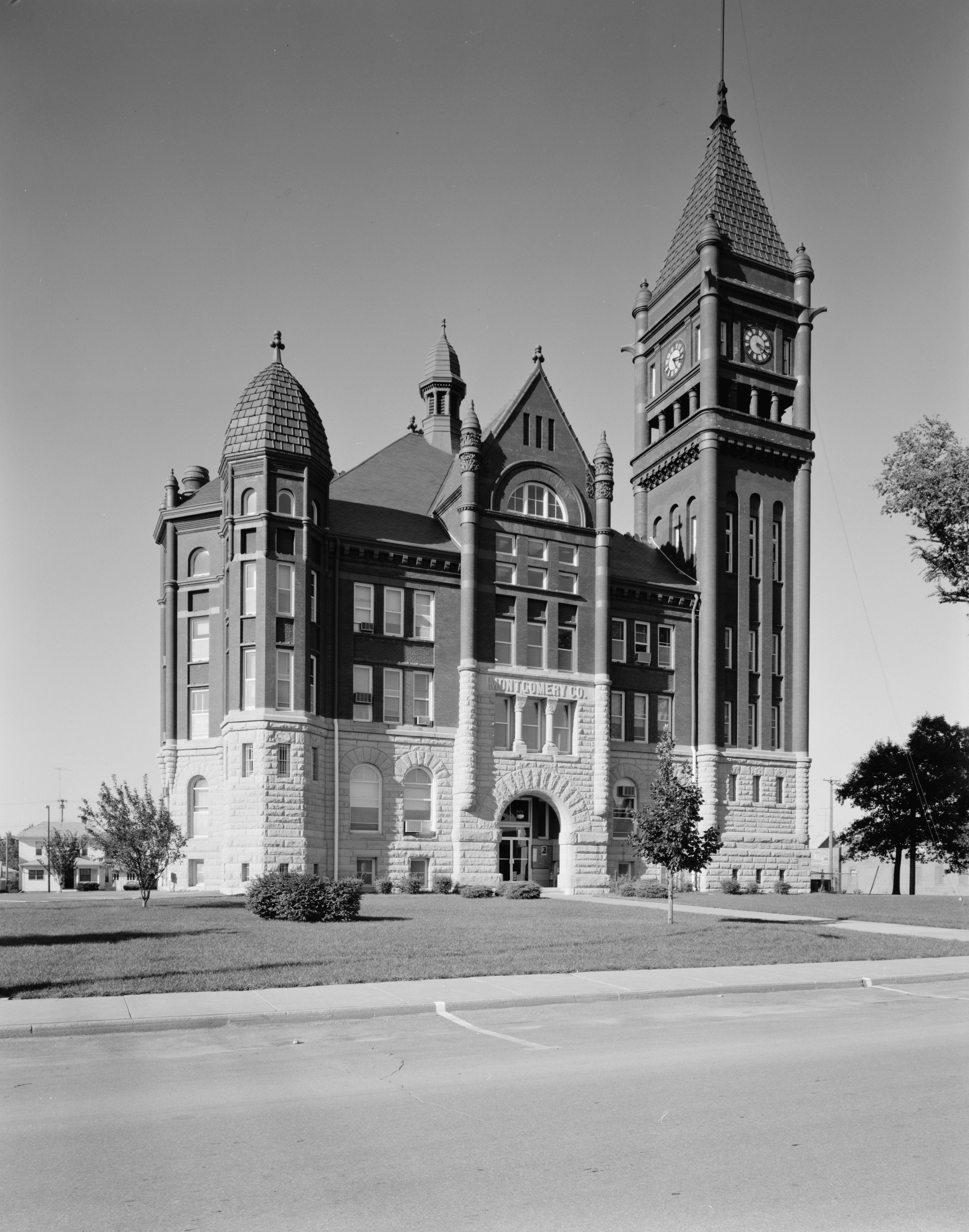
- The Montgomery County Courthouse in Red Oak

- Location within the U.S. state of Iowa
- Coordinates: 41.021735°N 95.157790°W
- Country: United States
- State: Iowa
- Created: January 15, 1851
- Organized: August 15, 1853
- Named for: Richard Montgomery
- Seat: Red Oak
- Largest city: Red Oak

Area
  - Total: 425.028 sq mi (1,100.82 km^{2})
  - Land: 424.097 sq mi (1,098.41 km^{2})
  - Water: 0.931 sq mi (2.41 km^{2}) 0.22%

Population (2020)
  - Total: 10,330
  - Estimate (2025): 10,002 ▼
  - Density: 24.36/sq mi (9.405/km^{2})
- Time zone: UTC−6 (Central)
  - Summer (DST): UTC−5 (CDT)
- Area code: 712
- Congressional district: 3rd
- Website: montgomerycountyia.gov
- Iowa county number 69

Montgomery County is a county located in the southwestern area of the U.S. state of Iowa. As of the 2020 United States census, the population was 10,330, and was estimated to be 10,002 in 2025. Its population has declined since a peak in 1900, since urbanization and decline of family farms. The county seat is Red Oak. The county was founded by European-American migrants from eastern areas in 1851. It was named in honor of Richard Montgomery, an American Revolutionary War general killed in 1775 while trying to capture Quebec City, Canada.

The county is largely rural and devoted to agriculture. The county was first surveyed in 1852. It is famous as the location of the unsolved Villisca axe murders committed in 1912. Clyde Cessna, the founder of the Cessna Aircraft Company was born here.

== Geography ==
According to the United States Census Bureau, the county has a total area of 425.028 square miles (1,100.82 km^{2}), of which 424.097 square miles (1,098.41 km^{2}) is land and 0.931 square miles (2.41 km^{2}) (0.22%) is water. It is the 90th largest county in Iowa by total area.

=== Major highways ===
- U.S. Highway 34
- U.S. Highway 71
- Iowa Highway 48

=== Adjacent counties ===
- Pottawattamie County (northwest)
- Cass County (northeast)
- Adams County (east)
- Page County (south)
- Mills County (west)

== Demographics ==
Historical population
Census	Pop.	Note	%±
1860	1,256		—
1870	5,934		372.5%
1880	15,895		167.9%
1890	15,848		−0.3%
1900	17,803		12.3%
1910	16,604		−6.7%
1920	17,048		2.7%
1930	16,752		−1.7%
1940	15,697		−6.3%
1950	15,685		−0.1%
1960	14,467		−7.8%
1970	12,781		−11.7%
1980	13,413		4.9%
1990	12,076		−10.0%
2000	11,771		−2.5%
2010	10,740		−8.8%
2020	10,330		−3.8%
2025 (est.)	10,002	▼	−3.2%
U.S. Decennial Census; 1790–1960 1900–1990; 1990–2000 2010–2020

=== 2020 census ===
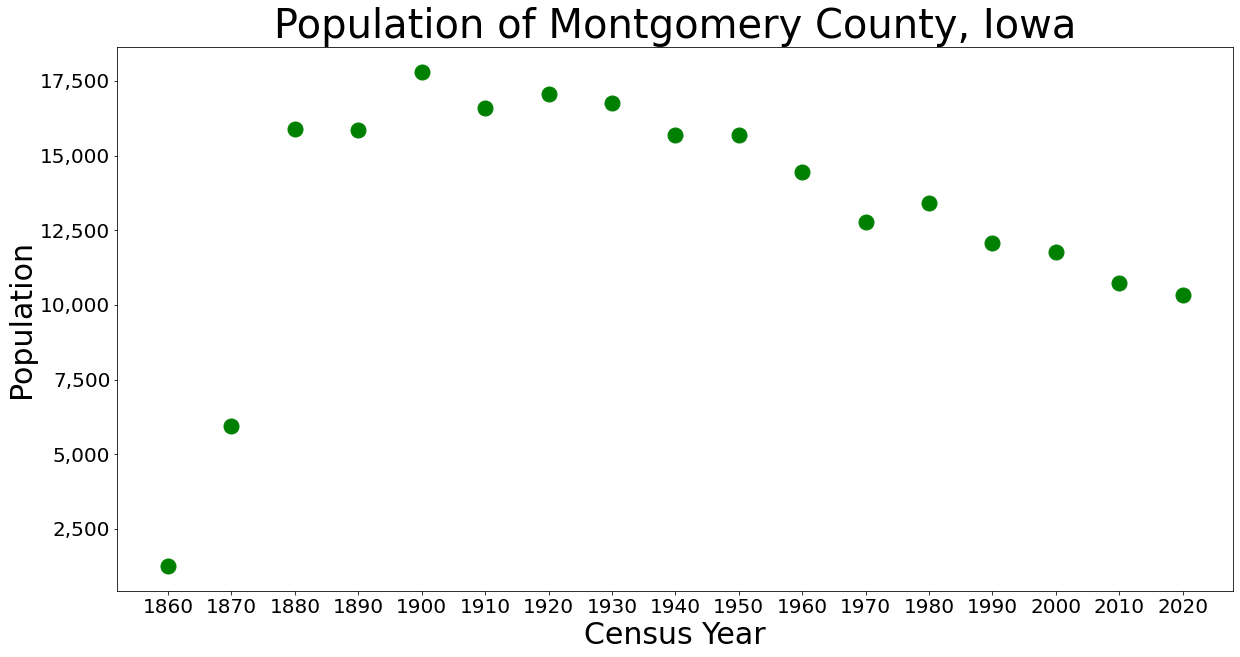
Population of Montgomery County from the U.S. census data

As of the 2020 census, the county had a population of 10,330 and a population density of 24.3/sq mi (9.4/km^{2}). The median age was 45.1 years. 22.0% of residents were under the age of 18 and 23.1% of residents were 65 years of age or older. For every 100 females there were 95.4 males, and for every 100 females age 18 and over there were 94.1 males age 18 and over.

The racial makeup of the county was 93.9% White, 0.2% Black or African American, 0.3% American Indian and Alaska Native, 0.3% Asian, <0.1% Native Hawaiian and Pacific Islander, 1.6% from some other race, and 3.6% from two or more races. Hispanic or Latino residents of any race comprised 3.6% of the population. 96.38% of the population reported being of one race, with 90.29% non-Hispanic White, 0.24% Black, 0.34% Native American, 0.25% Asian, 0.02% Native Hawaiian or Pacific Islander, and 5.27% some other race or more than one race.

53.4% of residents lived in urban areas, while 46.6% lived in rural areas.

There were 4,456 households in the county, of which 26.0% had children under the age of 18 living in them. Of all households, 46.6% were married-couple households, 19.6% were households with a male householder and no spouse or partner present, and 26.1% were households with a female householder and no spouse or partner present. About 33.0% of all households were made up of individuals and 16.6% had someone living alone who was 65 years of age or older.

There were 5,007 housing units, of which 11.0% were vacant. Among occupied housing units, 71.8% were owner-occupied and 28.2% were renter-occupied. The homeowner vacancy rate was 2.6% and the rental vacancy rate was 8.1%.

=== 2010 census ===
As of the 2010 census recorded a population of 10,740 in the county, with a population density of 25.3/sq mi (9.8/km^{2}). There were 5,239 housing units, of which 4,558 were occupied.

=== 2000 census ===
As of the 2000 census there were 11,771 people, 4,886 households, and 3,258 families in the county. The population density was 28 people per square mile (11 people/km^{2}). There were 5,399 housing units at an average density of 13 per square mile (5.0/km^{2}). The racial makeup of the county was 98.20% White, 0.08% Black or African American, 0.35% Native American, 0.25% Asian, 0.01% Pacific Islander, 0.68% from other races, and 0.44% from two or more races. 1.30%. were Hispanic or Latino of any race.

Of the 4,886 households 29.70% had children under the age of 18 living with them, 54.40% were married couples living together, 8.70% had a female householder with no husband present, and 33.30% were non-families. 29.50% of households were one person and 14.70% were one person aged 65 or older. The average household size was 2.36 and the average family size was 2.91.

The age distribution was 25.00% under the age of 18, 6.50% from 18 to 24, 25.50% from 25 to 44, 22.80% from 45 to 64, and 20.30% 65 or older. The median age was 40 years. For every 100 females there were 90.20 males. For every 100 females age 18 and over, there were 87.30 males.

The median household income was $33,214 and the median family income was $40,129. Males had a median income of $28,531 versus $20,835 for females. The per capita income for the county was $16,373. About 6.50% of families and 9.10% of the population were below the poverty line, including 12.30% of those under age 18 and 6.00% of those age 65 or over.

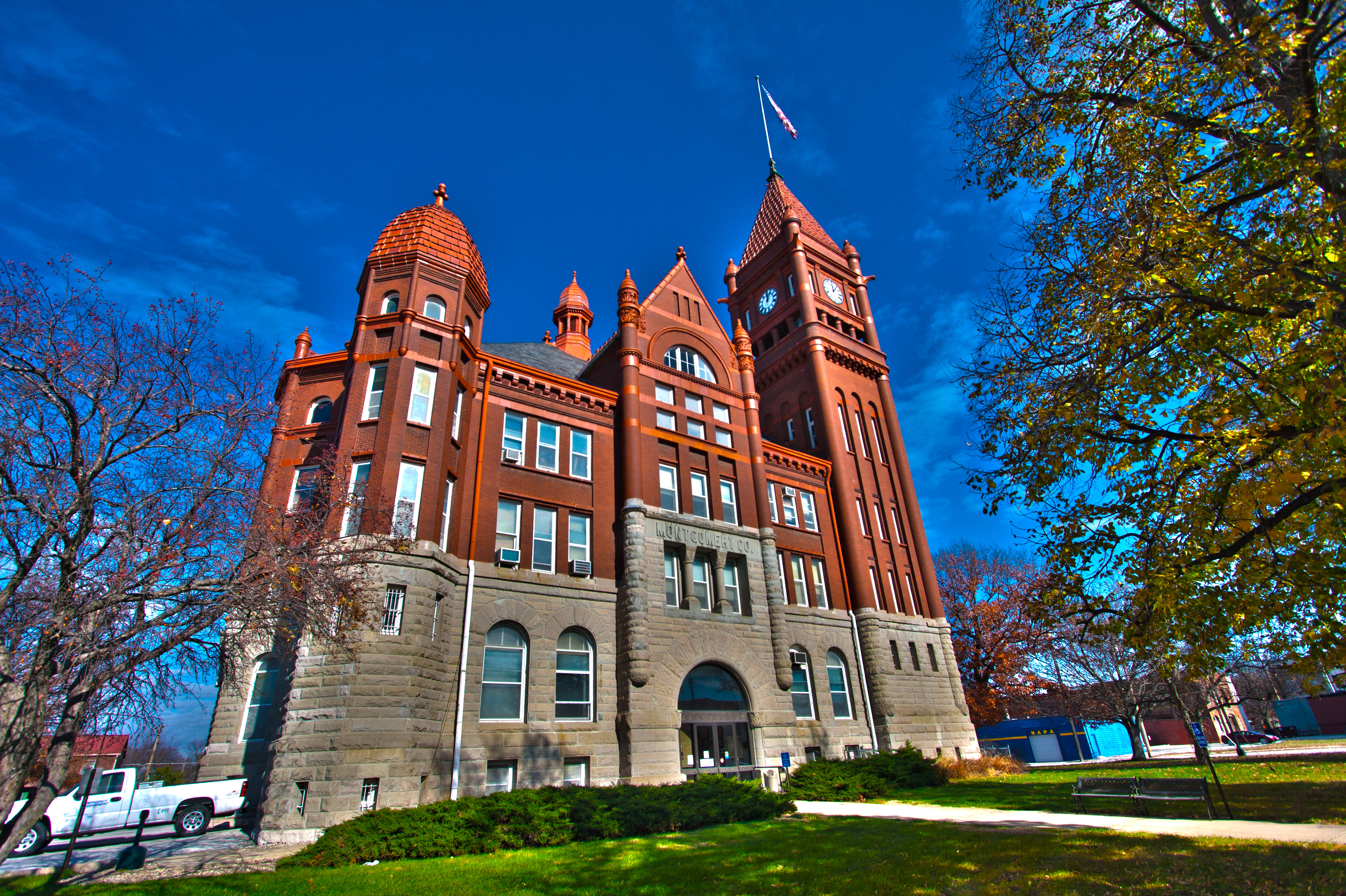
Montgomery County Courthouse, Henry C. Koch, architect, 1891

== Communities ==
=== Cities ===
- Coburg
- Elliott
- Grant
- Red Oak
- Stanton
- Villisca

=== Unincorporated communities ===
- Pittsburg
- Tenville

=== Former towns ===
- Alix (Douglas Township) 1895–98
- Arlington (Washington Township)
- Biddick (Pilot Grove Township) 1893–1902
- Carr's Point (West Township) 1865–70
- Climax (West Township) 1871–1901
- Coe's Grove 1858–69
- Flora 1859
- Frankfort (County seat from 1864 to 1865) (Frankfort Township) 1856–78
- Hawthorne 1871–1908
- Oro 1856–1858
- Ross Grove (Jackson Township) 1855–63
- Rossville (Jackson Township) 1855
- Sciola (Washington Township) 1855–1905
- Wales (Lincoln Township) 1886–1901
- Wallace (Douglas Township) 1875–78
- Wilson (Pilot Grove Township) 1870–79

=== Townships ===
- Douglas
- East
- Frankfort
- Garfield
- Grant
- Lincoln
- Pilot Grove
- Red Oak
- Scott
- Sherman
- Washington
- West

=== Population ranking ===
The population ranking of the following table is based on the 2020 census.

† county seat

Rank	City/Town/etc.	Municipal type	Population (2020 Census)
1	† Red Oak	City	5,596
2	Villisca	City	1,132
3	Stanton	City	678
4	Elliott	City	338
5	Grant	City	86
6	Coburg	City	26

== Politics ==
United States presidential election results for Montgomery County, Iowa
Year	Republican		Democratic		Third party(ies)	
Year	No.	%	No.	%	No.	%
1896	2,927	63.67%	1,634	35.54%	36	0.78%
1900	2,927	65.25%	1,467	32.70%	92	2.05%
1904	2,956	75.25%	722	18.38%	250	6.36%
1908	2,553	64.44%	1,282	32.36%	127	3.21%
1912	917	23.07%	1,206	30.35%	1,851	46.58%
1916	2,333	60.33%	1,431	37.01%	103	2.66%
1920	4,980	76.50%	1,404	21.57%	126	1.94%
1924	4,617	64.51%	805	11.25%	1,735	24.24%
1928	5,155	70.81%	2,079	28.56%	46	0.63%
1932	3,507	47.39%	3,760	50.80%	134	1.81%
1936	4,395	52.43%	3,920	46.77%	67	0.80%
1940	4,848	58.98%	3,332	40.54%	40	0.49%
1944	4,165	61.40%	2,572	37.92%	46	0.68%
1948	4,084	59.10%	2,751	39.81%	75	1.09%
1952	6,074	72.88%	2,235	26.82%	25	0.30%
1956	5,027	65.77%	2,597	33.98%	19	0.25%
1960	4,974	65.19%	2,655	34.80%	1	0.01%
1964	3,101	46.98%	3,489	52.86%	11	0.17%
1968	4,155	64.11%	1,892	29.19%	434	6.70%
1972	4,391	72.69%	1,559	25.81%	91	1.51%
1976	3,673	61.48%	2,229	37.31%	72	1.21%
1980	4,115	67.97%	1,556	25.70%	383	6.33%
1984	4,224	71.23%	1,661	28.01%	45	0.76%
1988	3,166	62.08%	1,898	37.22%	36	0.71%
1992	2,404	44.78%	1,599	29.78%	1,366	25.44%
1996	2,583	49.69%	1,912	36.78%	703	13.52%
2000	3,417	63.35%	1,838	34.07%	139	2.58%
2004	3,601	64.81%	1,899	34.18%	56	1.01%
2008	2,887	54.58%	2,326	43.98%	76	1.44%
2012	3,001	59.72%	1,922	38.25%	102	2.03%
2016	3,436	68.12%	1,314	26.05%	294	5.83%
2020	3,659	68.69%	1,583	29.72%	85	1.60%
2024	3,486	68.70%	1,508	29.72%	80	1.58%

== See also ==
- National Register of Historic Places listings in Montgomery County, Iowa
