= Missouri Valley Bridge & Iron Co. =

American bridge and iron manufacturing company

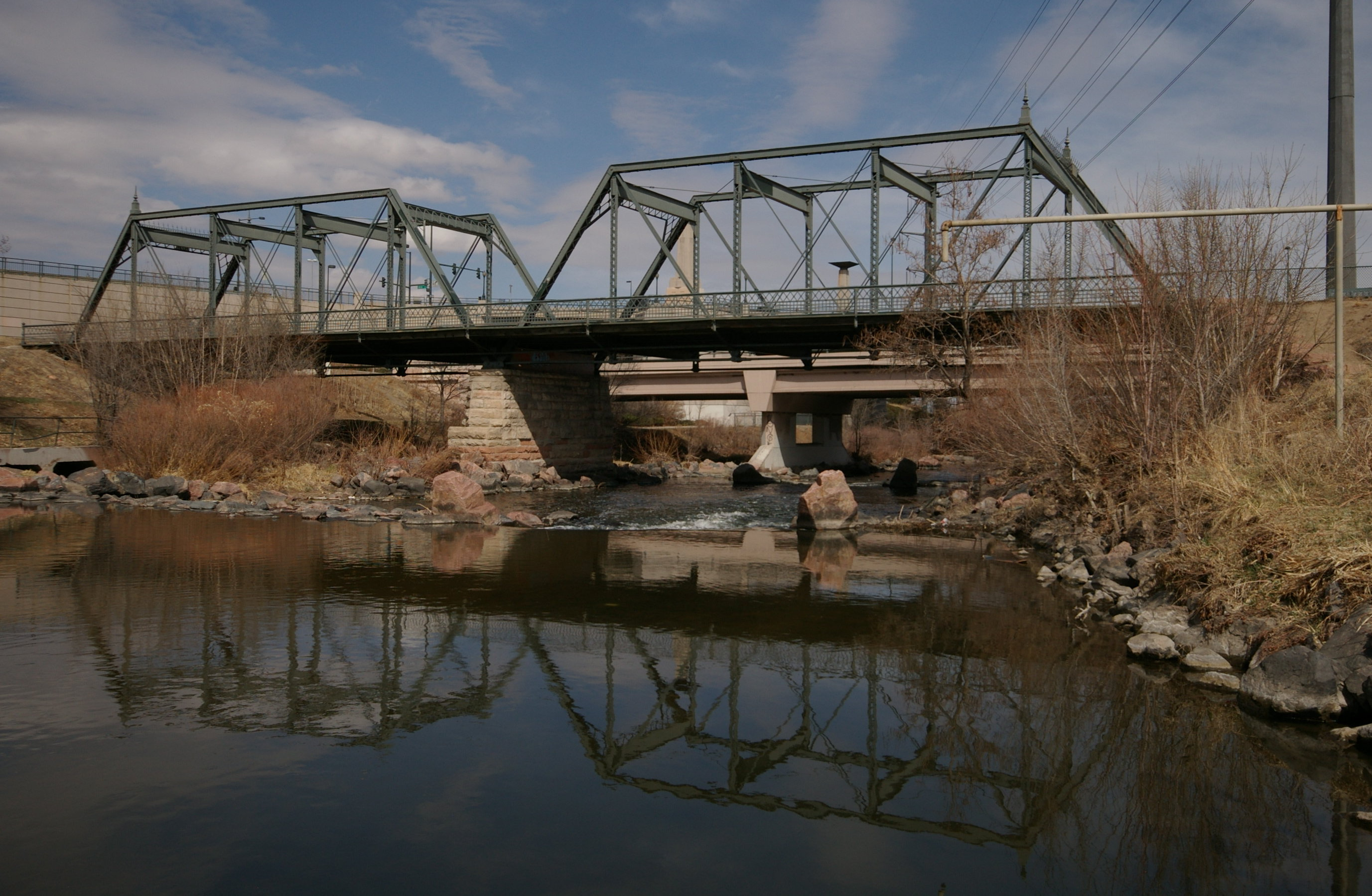
19th Street Bridge, from 1888, now a pedestrian bridge

The Missouri Valley Bridge & Iron Co., also known as Missouri Valley Bridge Company, was an engineering, construction, and steel fabrication firm that operated through the late nineteenth and most of the twentieth centuries. It was based in Leavenworth, Kansas, with a WWII facility in Evansville, Indiana.

== History ==
The company was formed in 1874 by Edwin Farnsworth and D. W. Eaves in Leavenworth, Kansas. In 1888, it was acquired by Alonzo. J. Tullock, who had previously served as the engineer and manager of the firm. Katherine S. Tullock, Alonzo's widow, served as the president from 1907 to 1921, an unusual development for the time in a male-dominated field. Her son, Hubert S. Tullock became president of the firm in 1921.

Throughout the early twentieth century, the firm supplied and built bridges across the country. These projects included the Free Bridge and the McKinley Bridge, both across the Mississippi River.

== National Register of Historic Places listed bridges ==
Many of the company's bridges are listed on the U.S. National Register of Historic Places. They include:

- 19th Street Bridge, built 1888, 19th St., Denver, CO (Missouri Valley Bridge & Iron Co.), NRHP-listed
- Cairo Mississippi River Bridge, built 1929, Cairo, Illinois to Bird's Point, Missouri (Missouri Valley Bridge & Iron Co.)
- Chevelon Creek Bridge, Chevelon Creek, SE of Winslow, Winslow, AZ (Missouri Valley Bridge & Iron Co.), NRHP-listed
- Cottonwood River Bridge, KS 177, N edge of Cottonwood Falls, Cottonwood Falls, KS (Missouri Valley Bridge & Iron Co.), NRHP-listed
- Cottonwood River Pratt Truss Bridge, Main St., 0.8 mi. W of int with 1st St., Cedar Point, KS (Missouri Valley Bridge Co.), NRHP-listed
- Crooked River Railroad Bridge (Oregon, 1911)
- Delaware River Warren Truss Bridge, Coyote Rd., 190th St., 4.1 mi. S, 0.5 mi. E of Fairview, Fairview, KS (Missouri Valley Bridge & Iron Co.), NRHP-listed
- East Fork Wolf Creek Pratt Truss Bridge, W 290th Dr., 0.8 mi. E of jct. with S. 50th Ave., 2.0 mi. S and 4.0 mi. E of Cheyenne, Delhi, KS (Missouri Valley Bridge Co.), NRHP-listed
- Eleventh Street Arkansas River Bridge, US 66 over the Arkansas R., from Tulsa to W. Tulsa, Tulsa, OK (Missouri Valley Bridge & Iron Co.), NRHP-listed
- Fish Creek Bridge, AZ 88, milepost 223.50, Tortilla Flat, AZ (Missouri Valley Bridge & Iron Co.), NRHP-listed
- Hobbs Creek Truss Leg Bedstead Bridge, On Hobbs Creek Rd., 0.6 mi. W of jct with Solomon Rd., Gypsum, KS (Missouri Valley Bridge & Iron Co.), NRHP-listed
- Labo Del Rio Bridge, Cty. Rd. F40 over Piedra River, Arboles, CO (Missouri Valley Bridge Company), NRHP-listed
- Lakewood Park Bridge, One Lakewood Dr., 0.01 mi. N of jct. with Iron Ave., Salina, KS (Missouri Valley Bridge & Iron Works), NRHP-listed
- Lewis and Clark Bridge, Over the Missouri R., MT 13, Wolf Point, MT (Missouri Valley Bridge and Iron Co.), NRHP-listed
- Ninth Street Bridge, E of new 9th Street bridge, over Boise R., Boise, ID (Missouri Valley Bridge & Iron Co.), NRHP-listed
- Nodaway River Bridge, Pedestrian path in Pilot Grove County Park, Grant, IA (Missouri Valley Bridge and Iron Co.), NRHP-listed
- South Canon Bridge, Cty. Rd. 134, Glenwood Springs, CO (Missouri Valley Bridge & Iron Co.), NRHP-listed
- State Bridge, Off CO 131, State Bridge, CO (Missouri Valley Bridge Company), NRHP-listed
- State Highway 3 Bridge at the Nueces River, US 90, 13 mi. E of jct. with Kinney Cnty., Uvalde, TX (Missouri Valley Bridge & Iron Co.), NRHP-listed
- Waco Suspension Bridge, over Brazos River, Waco, TX (1914 rehabilitation by Missouri Valley Bridge & Iron Co.), NRHP-listed

== Other projects ==
The Oregon Trunk Rail Bridge, a non−NRHP-listed one, was erected by the company across the Columbia River in Oregon and Washington. It is an approximately 3,000-foot (910 m) railroad bridge across the river, built in 1911 and opened in January 1912. The steel superstructure was manufactured by the Pennsylvania Steel Company, and erected by MVB&I company.

=== Shipyards ===
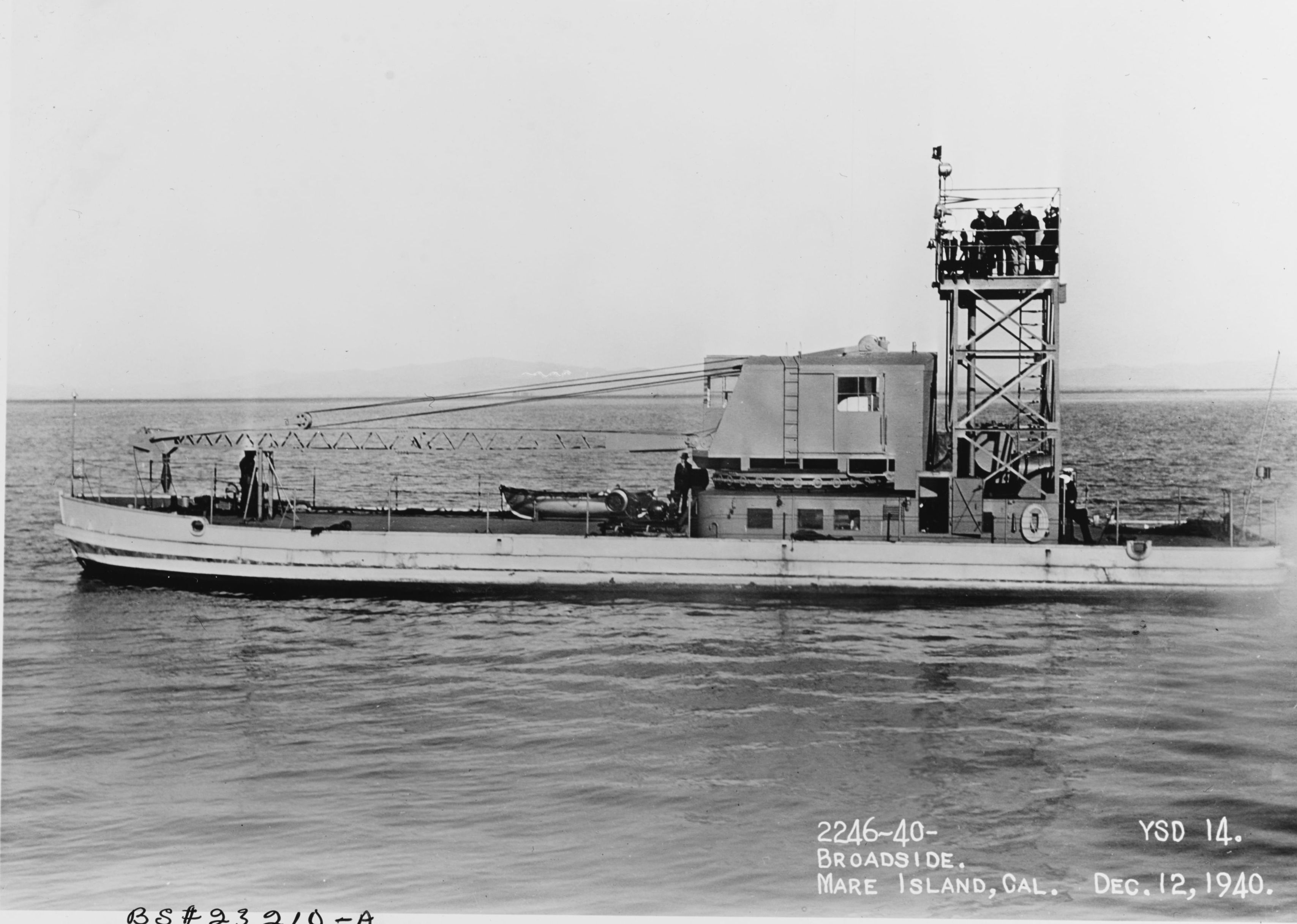
Seaplane Wrecking Derrick - YSD

During World War II the MVB&I company opened two shipyards, at Evansville, Indiana and at Leavenworth, Kansas. 171 LSTs (Landing Ship, Tank), 64 Landing craft tank and three YSD-11 Class Seaplane Wrecking Derrick were built during the war at Evansville, before the yard closed in 1945. The company ranked 98th among United States corporations in the value of World War II military production contracts.

The Leavenworth yard built a wide range of smaller naval and military vessels, continuing in business after the war, producing mainly towboats and barges until 1982.
