= National Register of Historic Places listings in Saunders County, Nebraska =

Location of Saunders County in Nebraska

Saunders County, Nebraska, United States, has 20 properties and districts listed on the National Register of Historic Places, and two former listings.

The locations of National Register properties and districts for which the latitude and longitude coordinates are included below may be seen in a map.

This National Park Service list is complete through NPS recent listings posted October 30, 2026.

== Listings county-wide ==
	Name on the Register	Image	Date listed	Location	City or town	Description
1	Ashland Archeological District		November 29, 2000 (#00001376)	Address Restricted	Ashland	
2	Ashland Public Library	Ashland Public Library	January 27, 1983 (#83001102)	207 N. 15th St. 41°02′27″N 96°22′08″W	Ashland	
3	Barnes Oil Company	Barnes Oil Company	December 5, 2002 (#02001475)	Junction of Silver St. and U.S. Route 6; 41°02′20″N 96°21′26″W	Ashland	
4	Camp Ashland Memorial Hall		March 11, 2021 (#100006287)	220 Cty. Rd. A (Camp Ashland); 41°03′46″N 96°20′06″W	Ashland	
5	Howard Hanson House	Howard Hanson House	January 27, 1983 (#83001103)	12th and Linden Sts. 41°12′59″N 96°37′07″W	Wahoo	
6	Hoffman Building	Hoffman Building	November 21, 2014 (#14000441)	1325 & 1341 Silver St. 41°02′20″N 96°22′06″W	Ashland	
7	Old Ithaca Grain Elevator	Old Ithaca Grain Elevator	February 23, 2001 (#01000168)	One block south of 4th St. 41°09′27″N 96°32′19″W	Ithaca	
8	Kacirek-Woita General Store	Kacirek-Woita General Store	July 8, 2014 (#14000397)	250 N. Elm St. 41°11′30″N 96°44′36″W	Weston	
9	F.J. Kirchman House	F.J. Kirchman House	August 21, 2003 (#03000796)	957 Beech St. 41°12′52″N 96°37′02″W	Wahoo	
10	Leshara Site		March 16, 1972 (#72000759)	Address Restricted	Leshara	
11	McClean Site		March 16, 1972 (#72000758)	Address Restricted	Inglewood	
12	National Bank of Ashland	National Bank of Ashland	January 27, 1983 (#83001104)	1442 Silver St. 41°02′21″N 96°22′09″W	Ashland	
13	O.K. Market	O.K. Market	July 3, 1991 (#91000835)	542 N. Linden Ave. 41°12′38″N 96°36′23″W	Wahoo	
14	Pahuk	Pahuk	August 14, 1973 (#73001074)	Address Restricted	Cedar Bluffs	
15	Rad Plzen cis. 9 Z.C.B.J. (SD10-6)	Rad Plzen cis. 9 Z.C.B.J. (SD10-6)	March 20, 1986 (#86000440)	Off Nebraska Highway 79; 41°25′52″N 96°45′58″W	Morse Bluff	
16	St. Stephen's Episcopal Church	St. Stephen's Episcopal Church	January 25, 1979 (#79001454)	16th and Adams Sts. 41°02′25″N 96°22′16″W	Ashland	
17	Saunders County Courthouse	Saunders County Courthouse	January 10, 1990 (#89002220)	Chestnut between 4th and 5th Sts. 41°12′34″N 96°37′24″W	Wahoo	
18	Wahoo Burlington Depot	Wahoo Burlington Depot	May 9, 1985 (#85000955)	431 W. 3rd 41°12′27″N 96°36′44″W	Wahoo	
19	Woodcliff Burials		March 7, 1973 (#73001075)	Address Restricted	Inglewood	
20	Yutan Site		June 26, 1972 (#72000760)	Address Restricted	Yutan	

== Former listings ==
	Name on the Register	Image	Date listed	Date removed	Location	City or town	Description
1	Ashland Bridge	Ashland Bridge	June 29, 1992 (#92000721)	March 3, 2023	Silver St. over Salt Creek; 41°02′21″N 96°21′52″W	Ashland	One of 2 surviving Warren pony truss bridges in Nebraska
2	Israel Beetison House	Israel Beetison House	April 18, 1977 (#77000839)	March 3, 2023	Southeast of Ashland; 41°01′54″N 96°21′12″W	Ashland	

== See also ==
- List of National Historic Landmarks in Nebraska
- National Register of Historic Places listings in Nebraska
