= Ashland Public Library (Ashland, Nebraska) =

- U.S. National Register of Historic Places
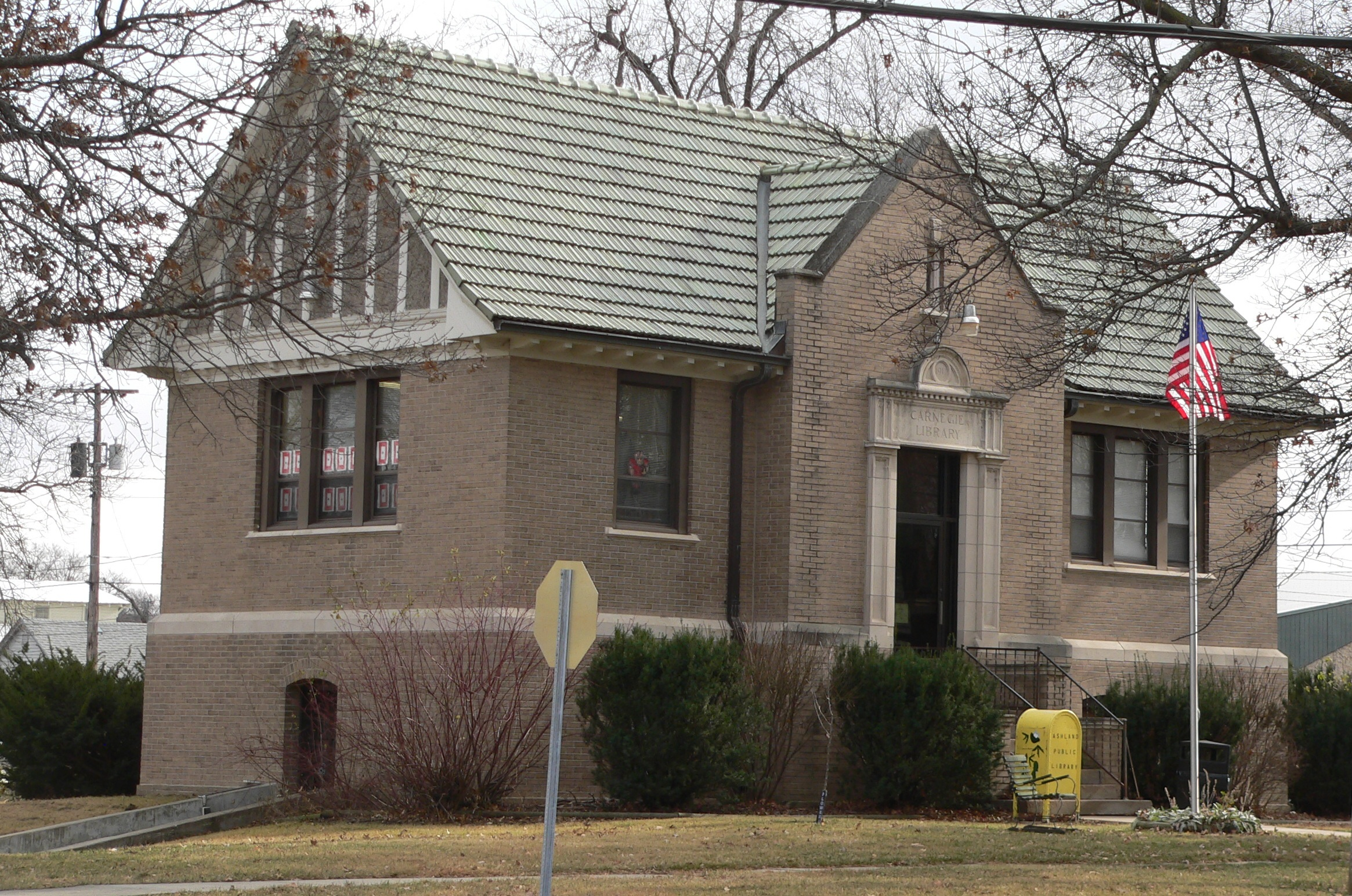
- The library in 2009

- Location within Nebraska Location within the United States
- Location: 207 North 15th Street, Ashland, Nebraska
- Coordinates: 41°02′27″N 96°22′08″W
- Area: less than one acre
- Built: 1911
- Built by: W. R. Shankland
- Architect: Fisher & Lawrie
- Architectural style: Jacobethan
- NRHP reference No.: 83001102
- Added to NRHP: January 27, 1983

The Ashland Public Library is a historic building in Ashland, Nebraska. It was built by W.R. Shankland as a Carnegie library in 1911. Besides the $5,500 donation from Andrew Carnegie, its construction had much to do with the Wiggenhorn family: the land was donated by Mr and Mrs Wiggenhorn Jr., and the roof was donated by H. A. Wiggenhorn. The building was designed in the Jacobethan style by Fisher & Lawrie, an architectural firm based in Omaha co-founded by Scottish-born Harry Lawrie and his American counterpart, George L. Fisher. It has been listed on the National Register of Historic Places since January 27, 1983.
