= St. Stephen's Episcopal Church (Ashland, Nebraska) =

- U.S. National Register of Historic Places
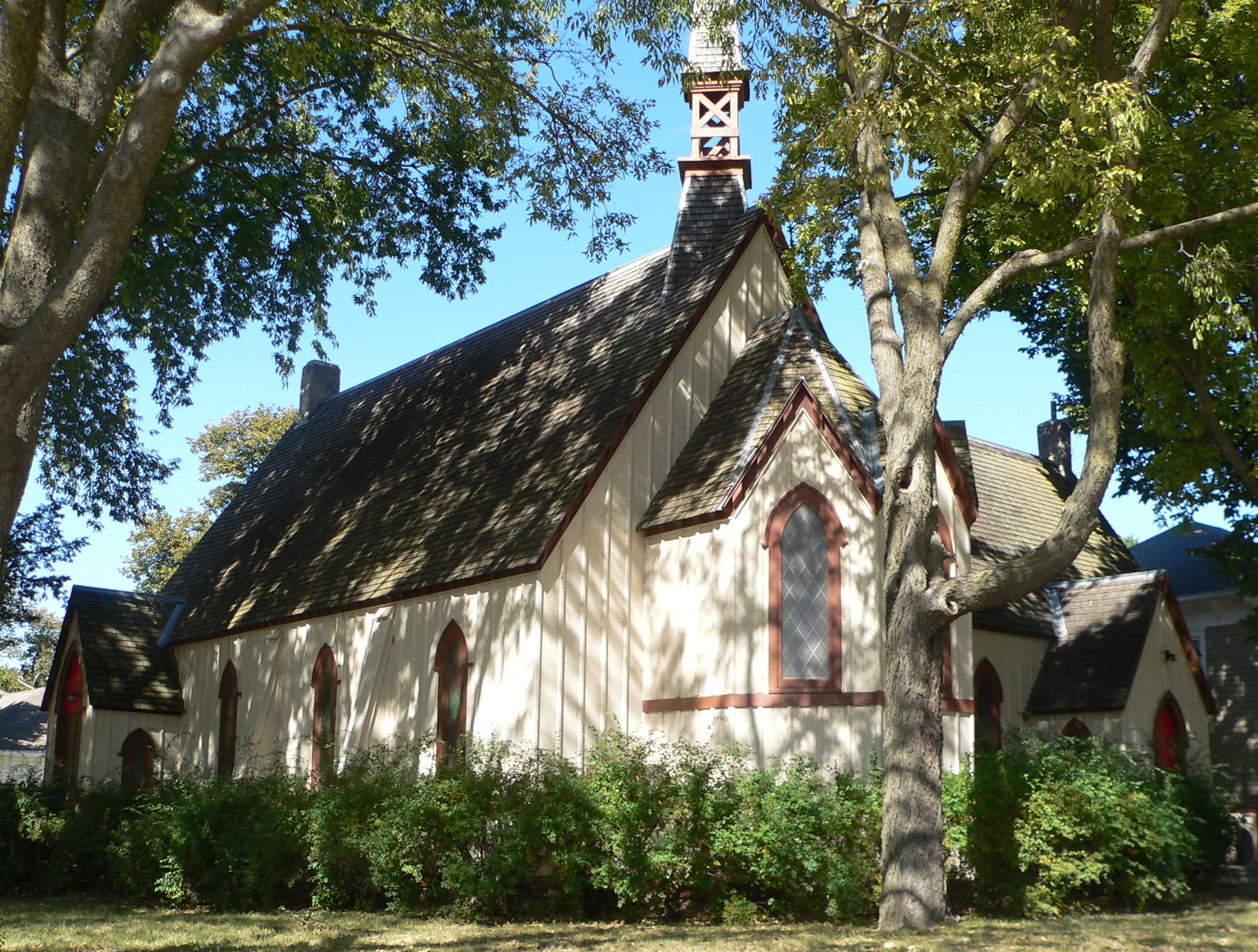
- The church in 2011

- Location within Nebraska Location within the United States
- Location: 16th and Adams Streets, Ashland, Nebraska
- Coordinates: 41°02′25″N 96°22′15″W
- Area: 0.4 acres (0.16 ha)
- Built: 1872
- Architectural style: Gothic Revival
- NRHP reference No.: 79001454
- Added to NRHP: January 25, 1979

St. Stephen's Episcopal Church is a historic church (building) in Ashland, Nebraska, currently serving as an event and exhibit space for the Ashland Arts Council.

It was built with board-and-batten in 1872 for the Episcopal Church, after Robert Harper Clarkson, the first bishop of the Episcopal Diocese of Nebraska, approved its construction in 1871.

The church was designed in the Gothic Revival style, with "a steeply pitched gable roof whose ridge is straddled by a belfry at the eastern end," and is considered one of Nebraska's best examples of the style. The design is similar to others by Richard Upjohn; however, the architect and builder of the church is unknown, and the extent of Upjohn's influence has not been ascertained.

The only Episcopal church in Saunders County, it was listed on the National Register of Historic Places on January 25, 1979. In 1992, the diocese closed the parish and sold the church to the Ashland Arts Council, which has maintained it ever since.
