= National Bank of Ashland =

- U.S. National Register of Historic Places
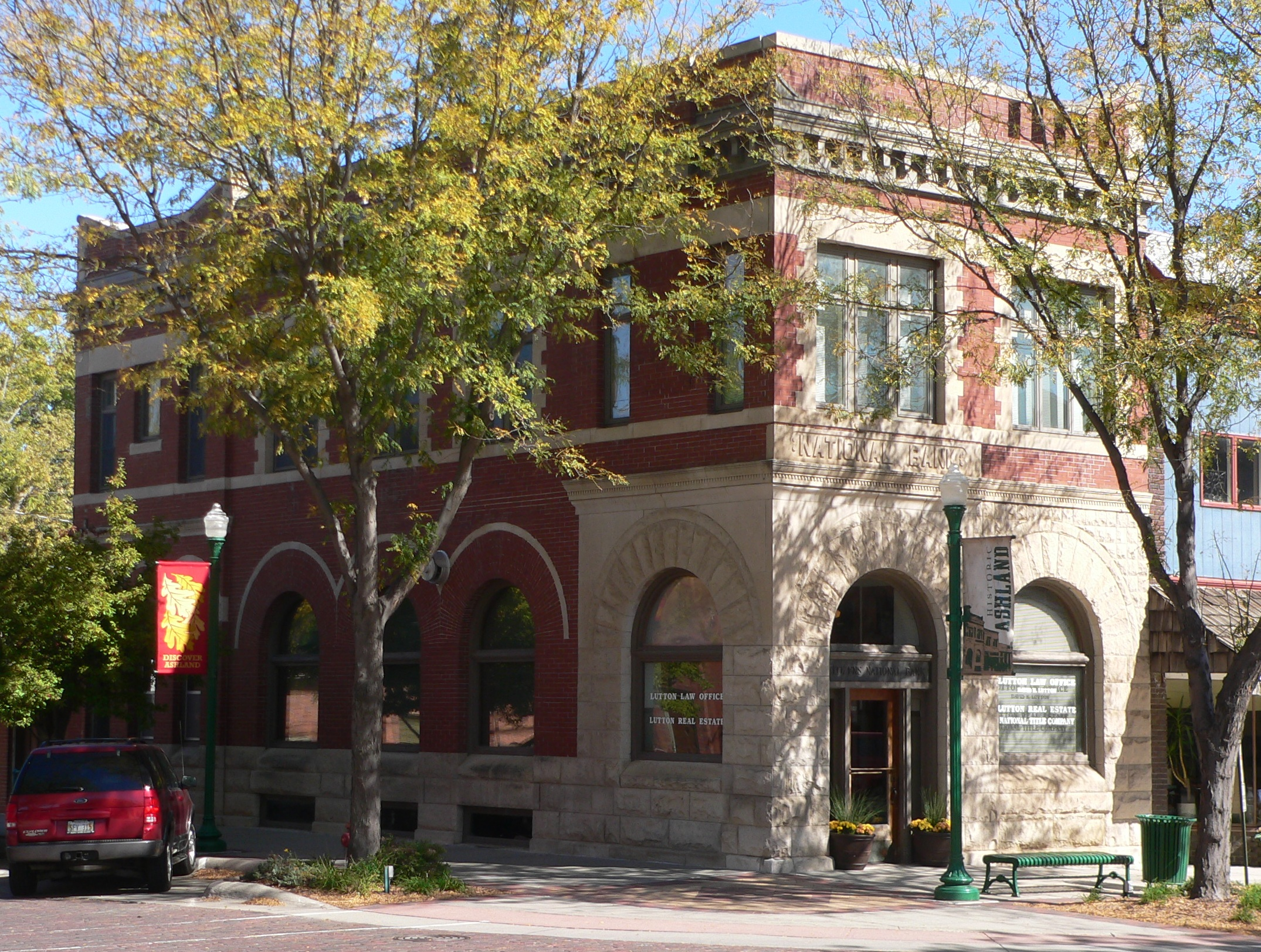
- The building in 2011

- Location within Nebraska Location within the United States
- Location: 1442 Silver Street, Ashland, Nebraska
- Coordinates: 41°02′21″N 96°22′09″W
- Area: less than one acre
- Built: 1889
- Architect: I & I Hodgson Jr.; Fred Organ
- Architectural style: Richardsonian Romanesque
- NRHP reference No.: 83001104
- Added to NRHP: January 27, 1983

The National Bank of Ashland is a historic two-story building in Ashland, Nebraska. It was built with bricks and stones in 1889 for the National Bank of Ashland. It was designed in the Richardsonian Romanesque style by I & I Hodgson Jr. in 1889, and redesigned by Fred Organ in 1935. It housed the National Bank of Ashland until, when it was taken over by the Citizen's National Bank until 1947. The building was subsequently remodelled as a law firm office for the Lutton Law Office until the 1980s at least. It has been listed on the National Register of Historic Places since January 27, 1983.
