= Kennedy Building (Omaha, Nebraska) =

- U.S. National Register of Historic Places
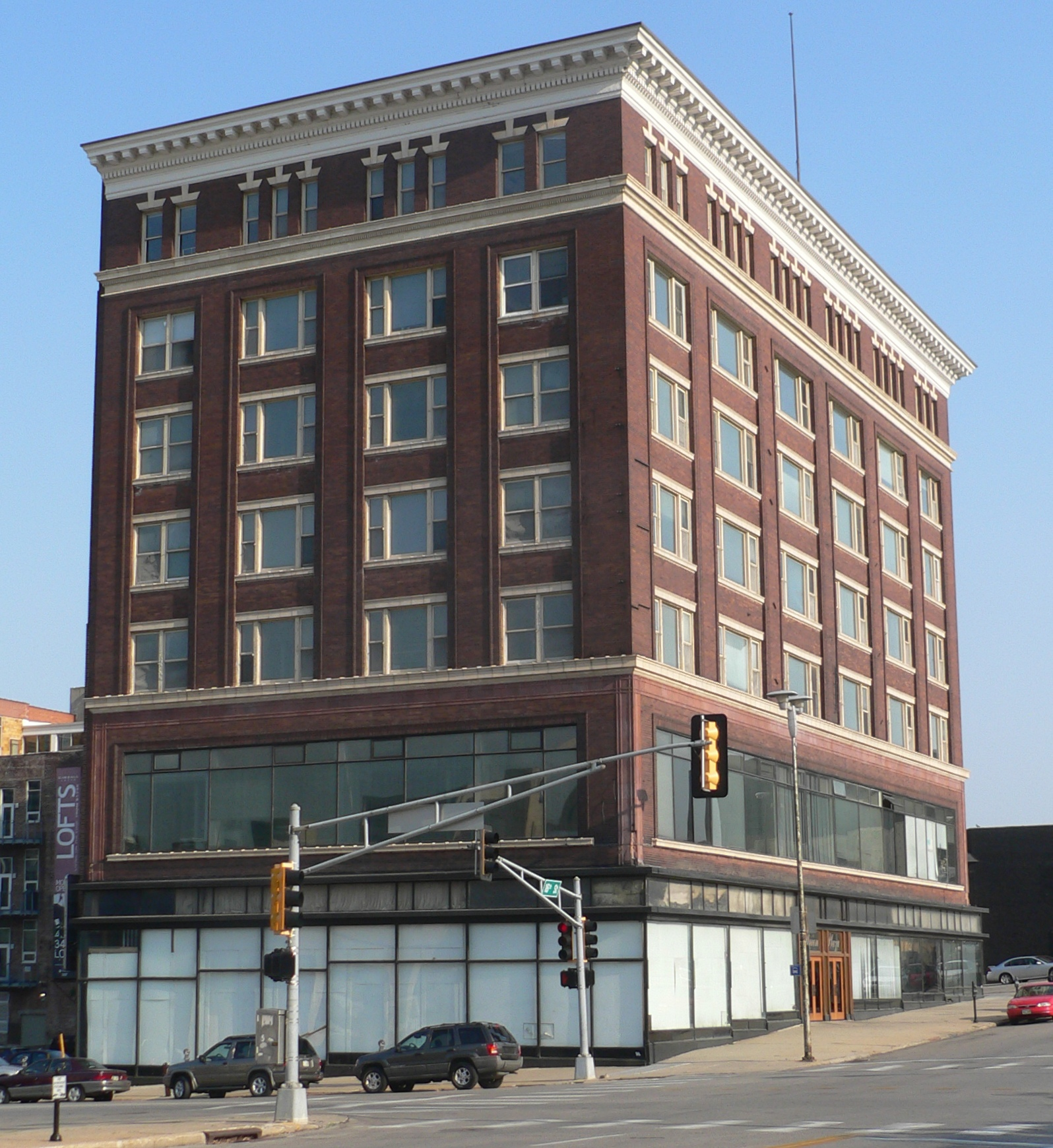
- Kennedy Building, seen from the northwest

- Location within Nebraska Location within the United States
- Location: 1517 Jackson Street, Omaha, Nebraska
- Coordinates: 41°15′15″N 95°56′13″W
- Built: 1910
- Architect: Fisher & Lawrie
- Architectural style: Chicago
- NRHP reference No.: 85001794
- Added to NRHP: August 23, 1985

The Kennedy Building is a high-rise historic commercial building located in Downtown Omaha, Nebraska, which was built in 1910. It was listed on the National Register of Historic Places in 1985.

It was deemed notable "as a unique local adaptation of the Commercial Style, as an example of the early twentieth century tripartite method of multi-story design inspired by Louis Sullivan, and as a work of the prominent Omaha architectural firm of Fisher and Lawrie."
