= Thos. D. Murphy Co. Factory and Power Plant =

- U.S. National Register of Historic Places
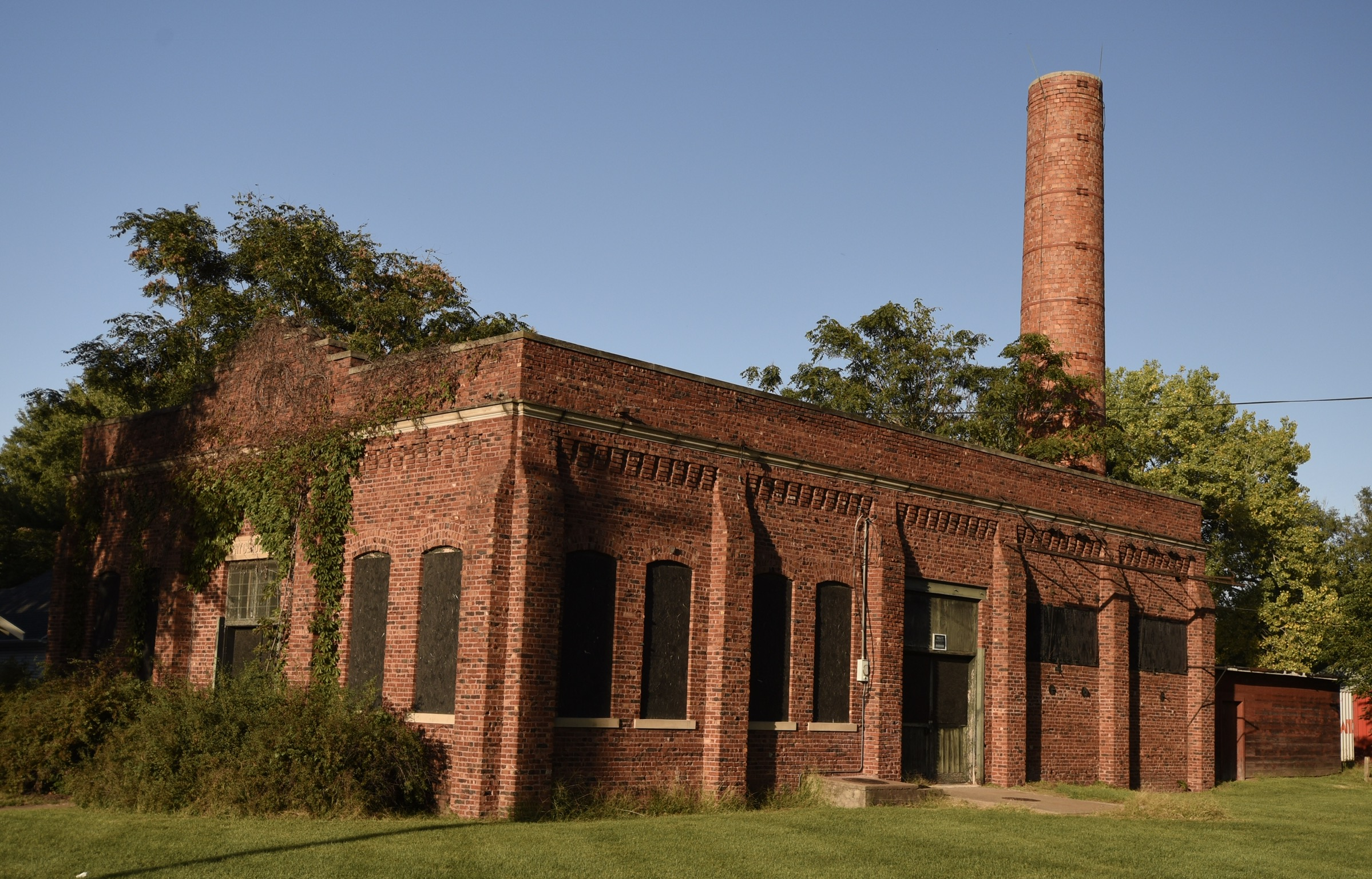
- Power Plant

- Location within Iowa Location within the United States
- Location: 110 S. 2nd St. Red Oak, Iowa
- Coordinates: 41°0′17″N 95°13′48″W
- Area: less than one acre
- Built: 1905
- Built by: P.M. Garthwait
- Architect: Harry Lawrie
- Architectural style: Late 19th and Early 20th century American Movement
- NRHP reference No.: 08000505
- Added to NRHP: May 19, 2008

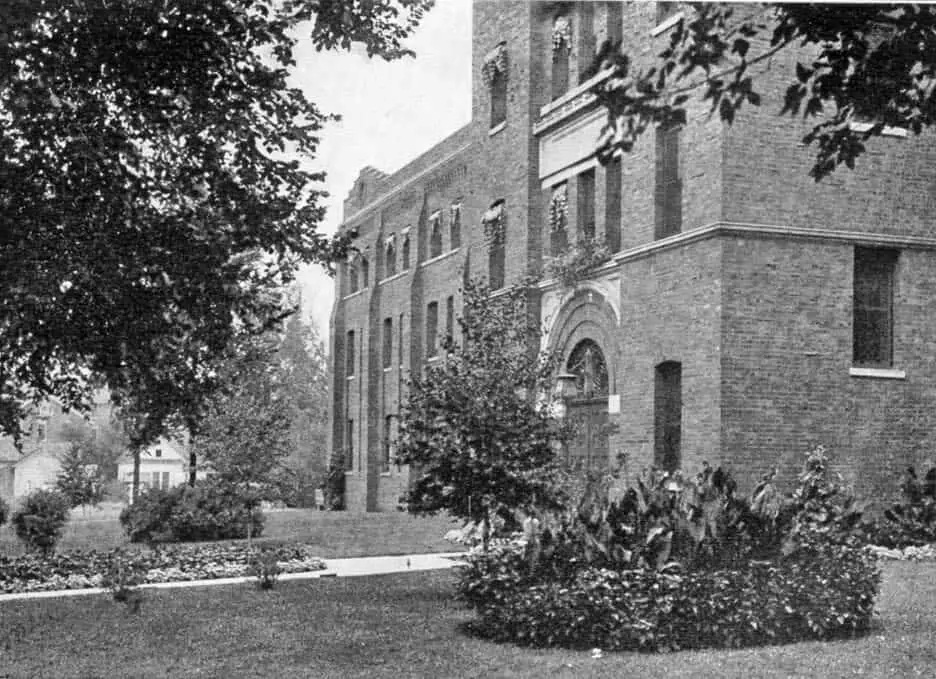
Thomas D. Murphy Calendar Company, Red Oak, Iowa

The Thos. D. Murphy Co. Factory and Power Plant, also known as the Thos. D. Murphy Calendar Company, is located in Red Oak, Iowa, United States. Thomas D. Murphy was the first person who successfully developed advertising art calendars, and is the individual who is most responsible for the creation, development and expansion of the art calendar industry. The three-story brick building has a four-story projecting pavilion in the center of the main facade. The Arts and Crafts Movement was the main architectural influence of the structure designed by Omaha architect Harry Lawrie. The main part of the factory building was completed in 1905, expanded in 1907, and expanded again in 1920. The power plant part of the historic designation was part of the 1920 expansion. It houses a 120-horsepower Corliss steam engine that was built by the Murray Iron Works of Burlington, Iowa. It is thought to be one of the last of its kind in Iowa. It was listed on the National Register of Historic Places in 2008.
