= Israel Beetison House =

Historic place in Nebraska, United States

- Formerly listed on the U.S. National Register of Historic Places
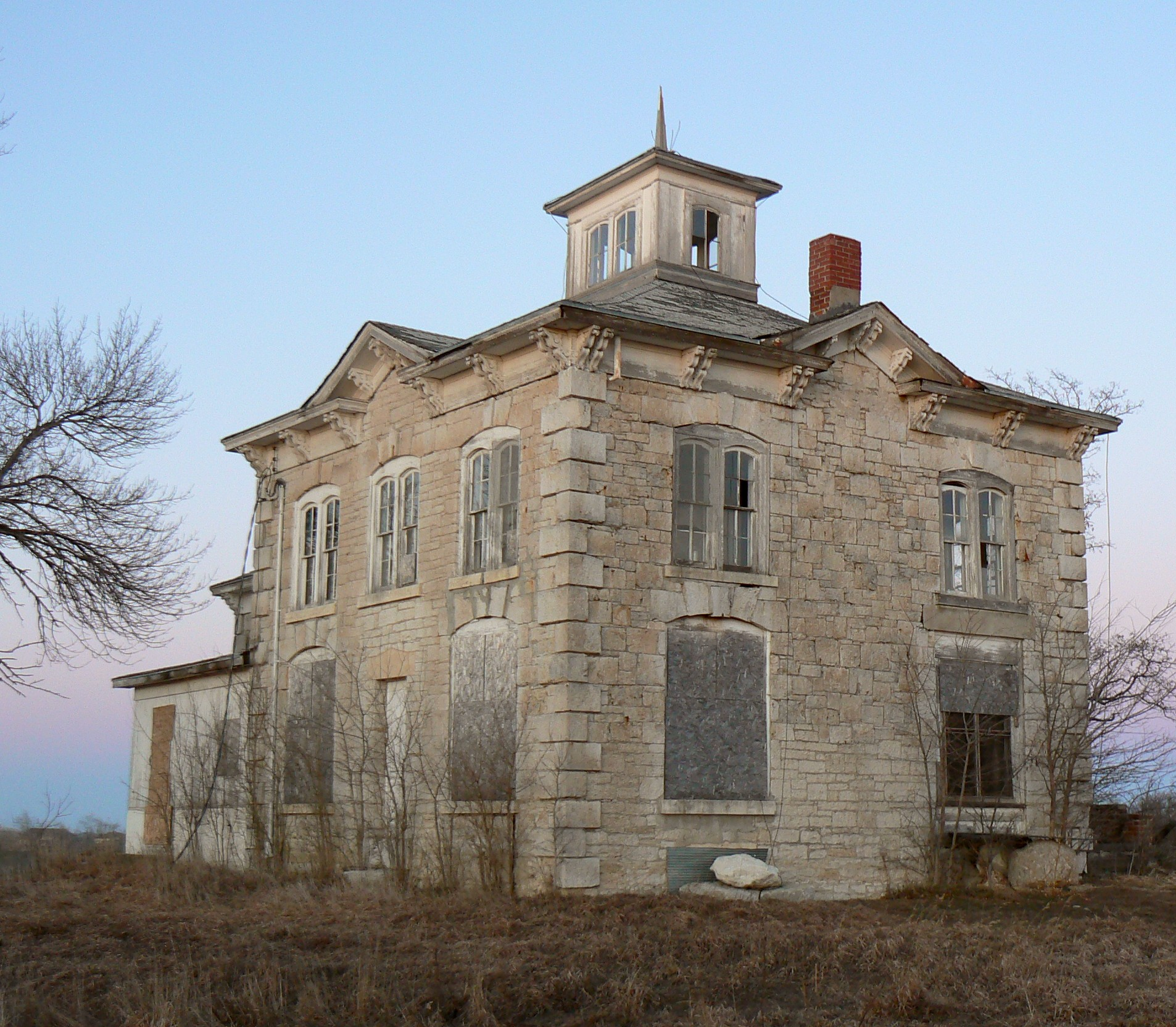

- Location within Nebraska Location within the United States
- Nearest city: Ashland, Nebraska
- Coordinates: 41°01′54″N 96°21′12″W
- Area: 1 acre (0.40 ha)
- Built: 1874
- Architect: Dalton Bros.
- Architectural style: Italianate
- NRHP reference No.: 77000839

Significant dates
- Added to NRHP: April 18, 1977
- Removed from NRHP: March 3, 2023

The Israel Beetison House, located southeast of Ashland, Nebraska, was built in 1874 and lived in by five generations of the Beetison family until it was sold to developers in 1999. It was listed on the National Register of Historic Places in 1977 and was delisted in 2023. The house sat vacant for over 20 years until it was destroyed by fire in 2022.

Its 1976 NRHP nomination states that it "stands as one of the fine examples of the Italianate style of architecture in Nebraska. Due to the economic hardship associated with the settlement of a wilderness territory, the Greek and Gothic Revivals saw very little development in Nebraska before they had passed out of favor. The Italianate was probably the first style in the state to gain widespread popularity."

The home's original owner was Israel Beetison. He was from England and moved to Massachusetts in 1845 and later moved to a homestead in Nebraska in the 1860s. He commissioned local masons to carve 18-inch-thick limestone blocks out of quarries in South Bend and Louisville. A team of horses and wagons dragged the blocks nearly 10 miles to the homestead. Ruts from the Ox-Bow Trail ran through the land that the Beetison house sits on, and 900-year-old Native American burial grounds were discovered there in 1937. The house was a staple in Ashland, Nebraska, and could be seen while entering Ashland while driving on Nebraska Highway 66.

The house was destroyed in a fire on April 12, 2022, and was then demolished on May 2, 2022.
