= Old University Library =

- U.S. National Register of Historic Places
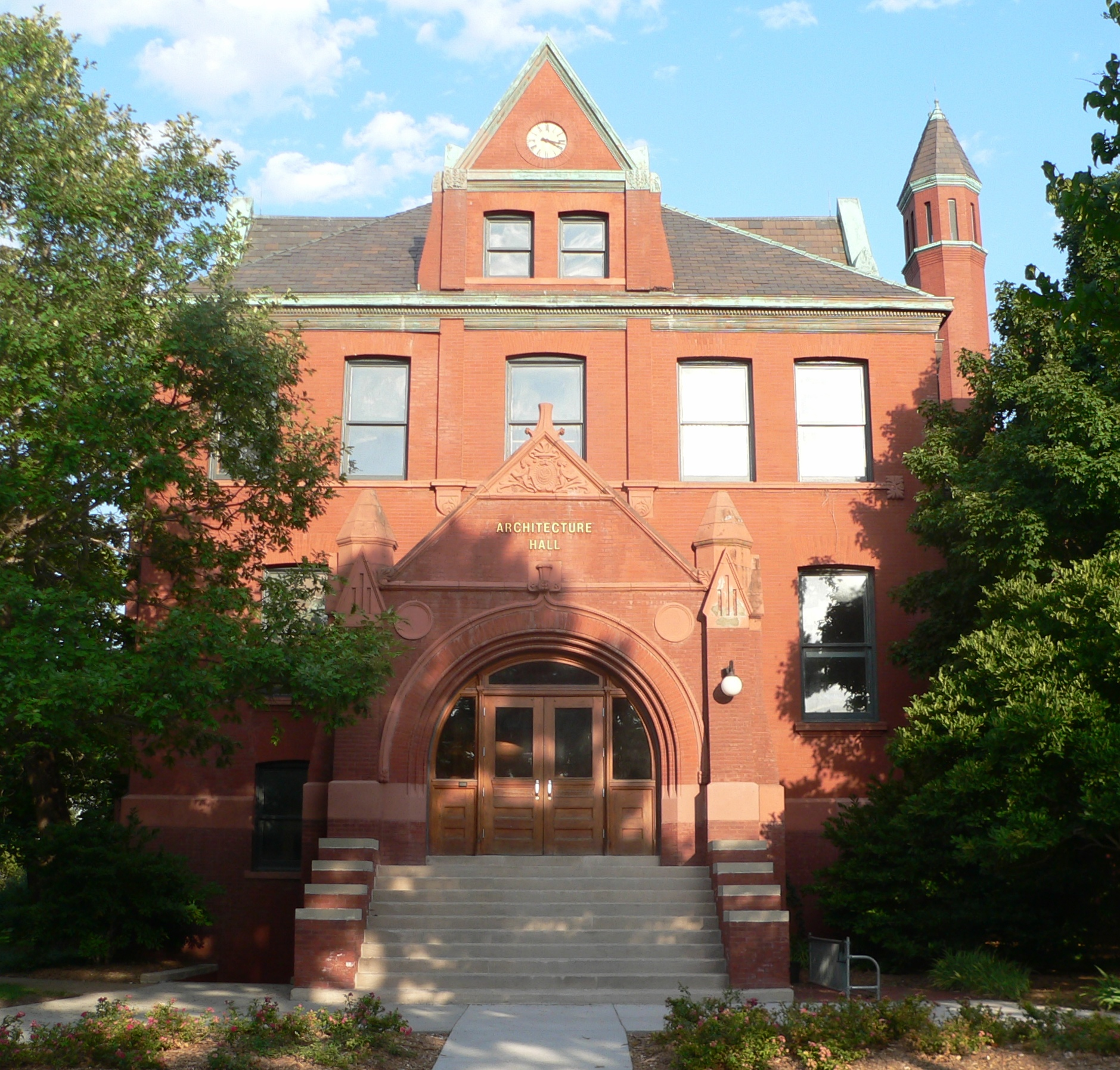
- The east entrance in 2012

- Location within Nebraska Location within the United States
- Location: 11th and R Streets; Lincoln, Nebraska
- Coordinates: 40°49′02″N 96°42′21″W
- Area: Less than one acre
- Built: 1895
- Architect: Mendelssohn, Fisher and Lawrie
- Architectural style: Richardsonian Romanesque
- NRHP reference No.: 75001098
- Added to NRHP: August 6, 1975

Old University Library (originally University Library and later Navy Hall, now part of Architecture Hall) is a historic building on the campus of the University of Nebraska–Lincoln in Lincoln, Nebraska. It opened in 1895 and was added to the National Register of Historic Places in 1975.

== Planning and construction ==
A new library for the University of Nebraska was commissioned in June 1891 based on drawings submitted by Mendelssohn, Fisher and Lawrie. The university rejected initial bids due to financial constraints, later accepting a revised bid of $110,000 from A. Rosenburg of Omaha. Despite a statewide economic downturn throughout the 1890s, administrators James Hulme Canfield, George Edwin MacLean, and Charles Henry Morrill convinced the Nebraska Legislature to contribute $37,000 in funding, and later an additional $75,000.

The 31,000-square-foot, three-and-a-half-story building was constructed in two phases – work began on the bulk of the structure in 1892, and a reinforced north wing was undertaken the following year. Canfield surveyed the building site frequently, hoping to prevent the construction defects that plagued many of the university's early buildings. It was constructed with Colorado sandstone topped with red brick, designed in the Richardsonian Romanesque style, with expansive skylights, low archways, and a prominent east-facing tower (at the time, it was oriented toward the main campus green space). The footprint of the main building measured 130 feet by 65 feet and the north wing 50 feet by 75 feet.

== History ==
University Library was dedicated in December 10, 1895 on the west edge of the University of Nebraska's campus. It initially housed the university library and archives on the first floor, the art department on the second story, and the Nebraska State Historical Society in the basement, though nearly the entire building was dedicated to the library barely a decade after its opening.

University Library soon became overcrowded with the university's collections, and fundraising began in earnest for a new building in the late 1930s. The library and archives were moved to Love Library in 1945, and by 1953 each original tenant had moved out.

In 1946, the Architecture Department moved to University Library, which was briefly renamed Navy Hall following World War II before becoming Architectural Hall (later shortened to Architecture Hall). Architecture Hall underwent a $4.3-million renovation from 1985 to 1987, which included the construction of a glass atrium to link it to the adjacent Old Law College. A 21,000-square-foot expansion was added to northwest edge of the facility in 2024.

Old University Library is the oldest extant building used by the school. It was added to the National Register of Historic Places on August 6, 1975.
