= Morton-James Public Library =

- U.S. National Register of Historic Places
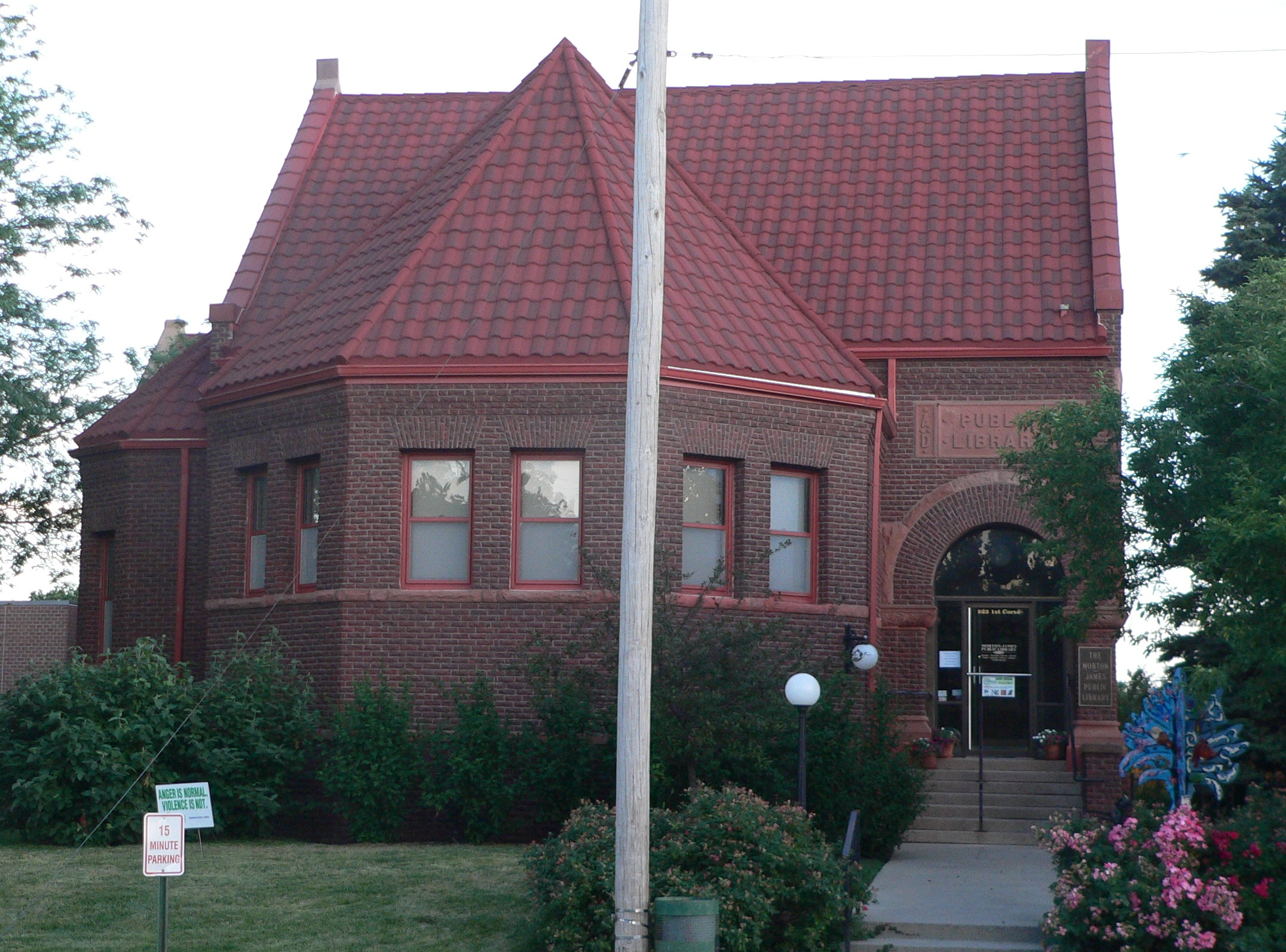
- View from the north, from First Corso

- Location within Nebraska
- Location: Nebraska City, Nebraska
- Coordinates: 40.675441°N 95.85736°W
- Built: 1897
- Architect: Fisher & Lawrie
- Architectural style: Richardsonian Romanesque
- NRHP reference No.: 76001134
- Added to NRHP: May 28, 1976

The Morton-James Public Library is a library in the city of Nebraska City, in the southeastern part of the state of Nebraska, in the Midwestern United States. The building, located at 923 1st Corso, has been described as "a modest, yet fine example of the Richardsonian Romanesque style of architecture in Nebraska". In 1976, it was listed in the National Register of Historic Places.

== History ==
A variety of literary groups were formed in Nebraska City during the late 1860s, including the Young Men's Literary Association, the Nebraska City Mercantile Library Association and the Round Table Club. These groups eventually consolidated, and in 1882 formed the Ladies Library Association. This association began fund-raising efforts to construct a public library.

At the behest of Nebraska City resident J.W. Steinhart, Joy Morton (son of editor and politician J. Sterling Morton), agreed to finance construction of a library building if the city would provide the land and equip the library. The people of Nebraska City raised $2,950 for the purchase of land and fixtures for the library, and a building was designed in the Richardsonian Romanesque style by Omaha architect George L. Fisher. Construction, from rock-faced brick trimmed in red-brown sandstone, began in 1896; the building was dedicated in 1897. The completed structure was presented to the city, and a Library Board was created to administer the operation of the library.

In 1932, as a gift from Joy Morton, a three-story stack room was added to the south side of the library. In 1970, the name of the library officially became the Morton-James Public Library to honor the original donor Joy Morton as well as Vantine James, who served as a library board member for 38 years. Further expansion of the library occurred in 1975 when a new children's department known as the “Strawberry Patch” was constructed in the downstairs of the building, and in 2002 when a $1.59 million addition expanded the east and south sides of the building, nearly doubling the library's space.

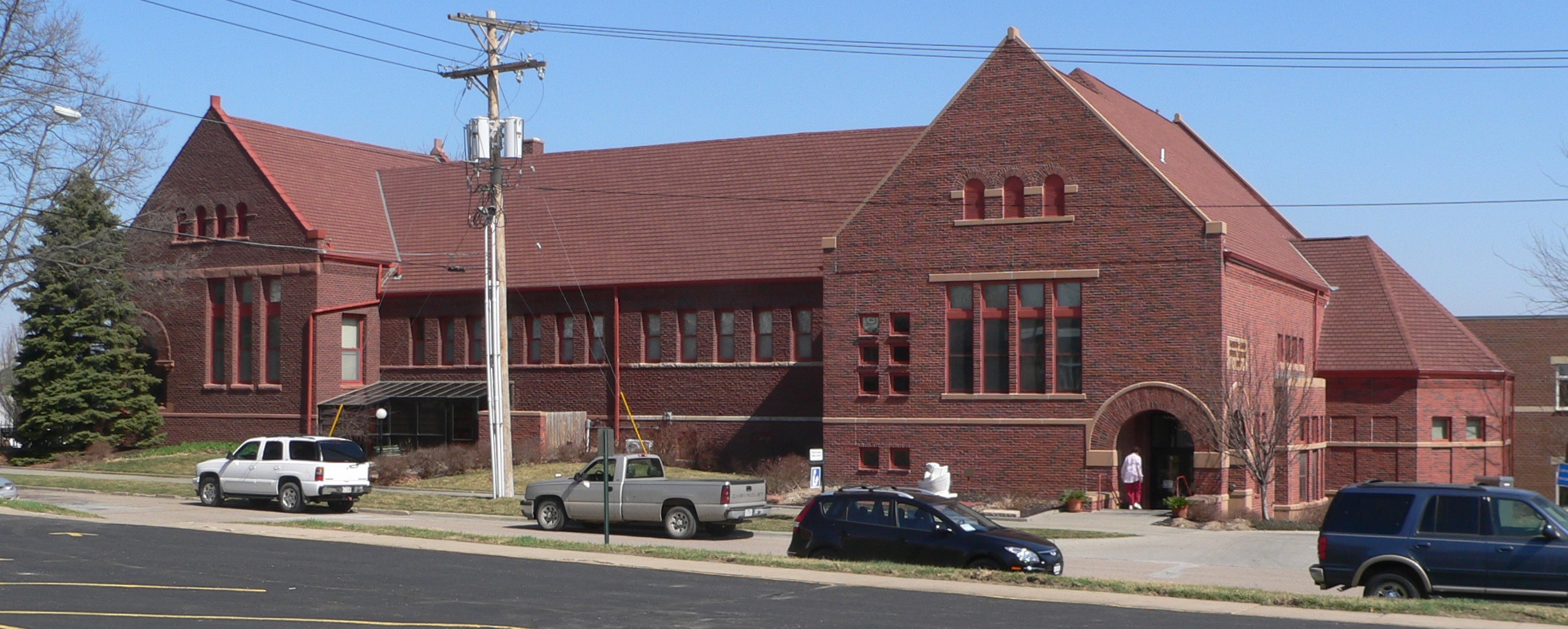
View from the southwest, across 10th Street

In 1976, the library was listed in the National Register of Historic Places. The building was determined to be of statewide significance due to the time-period of its construction, its notable architecture, and the educational and social/humanitarian missions which it fulfilled. According to the National Register nomination form, the library is "probably the finest known structure," designed by the architectural firm Fisher & Lawrie, with the exception of the Old University Library in Lincoln, Nebraska.
