= Hicks Terrace =

- Location within Nebraska Location within the United States
- 41°14′55″N 95°57′27″W
- Location: Omaha, Nebraska

History
- Built: 1890

Site notes
- Architect: Mendelssohn, Fisher and Lawrie

Omaha Landmark
- Designated: April 21, 1981

Hicks Terrace is located at 3005-3011 Pacific Street and 1102 South 30th Avenue in Omaha, Nebraska. Built in 1890, the structure represents the Queen Anne style of architecture. Designed by the early Omaha firm of Mendelssohn, Fisher and Lawrie, the building was constructed in 1890, and designated an Omaha Landmark on April 21, 1981. It was built as one of the multi-family residential structures in Omaha to be made of masonry. It was specifically designed to cater to the elaborate trolley networks that opened many new areas of the city to development.

== See also ==
- Landmarks in Omaha, Nebraska
