= Highspire High School =

- U.S. National Register of Historic Places
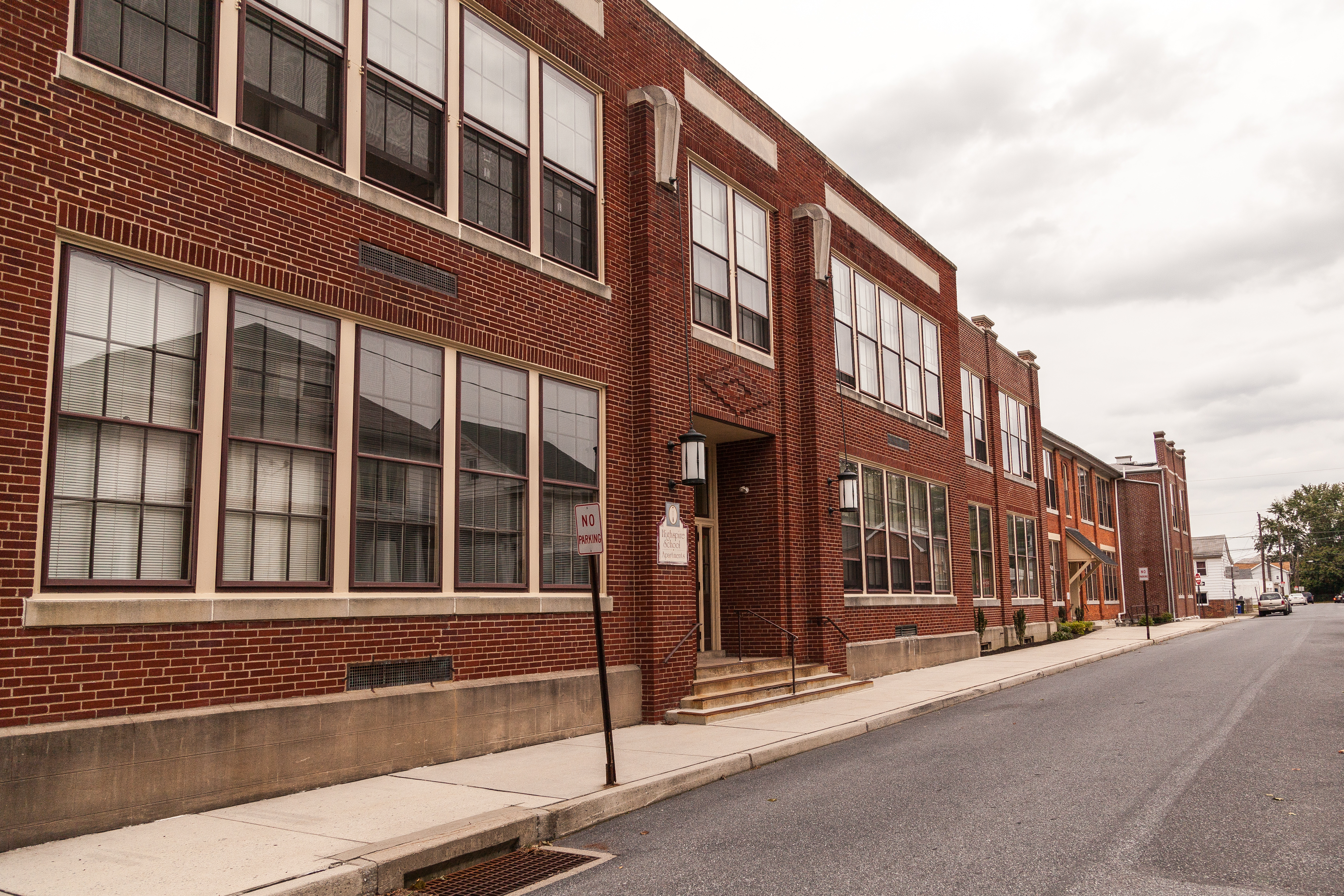

- Location within Pennsylvania Location within the United States
- Location: 221 Penn St., Highspire, Pennsylvania
- Coordinates: 40°12′36″N 76°47′27″W
- Area: 0.7 acres (0.28 ha)
- Built: 1875, 1939
- Built by: H. R. Alexander (1939)
- Architect: G. Fisher (1875); Lawrie & Green (1939)
- Architectural style: Late Gothic Revival
- NRHP reference No.: 90000703
- Added to NRHP: April 26, 1990

Highspire High School is an historic high school building which is located in Highspire, Dauphin County, Pennsylvania, United States.

It was added to the National Register of Historic Places in 1990.

== History and architectural features ==
Built in various stages between 1875 and 1939, Highspire High School is a two-story, brick building, that originally started as a four-room schoolhouse. Additions were made in 1902, 1915 and 1926; an auditorium and gymnasium were added in 1939. The 1939 addition featured Art Deco style pilaster capitals and cornice. The building ceased use as a school in 1983.

It was added to the National Register of Historic Places in 1990.
