= McCornick Building =

Historic building in Salt Lake City, Utah, U.S.

- U.S. National Register of Historic Places
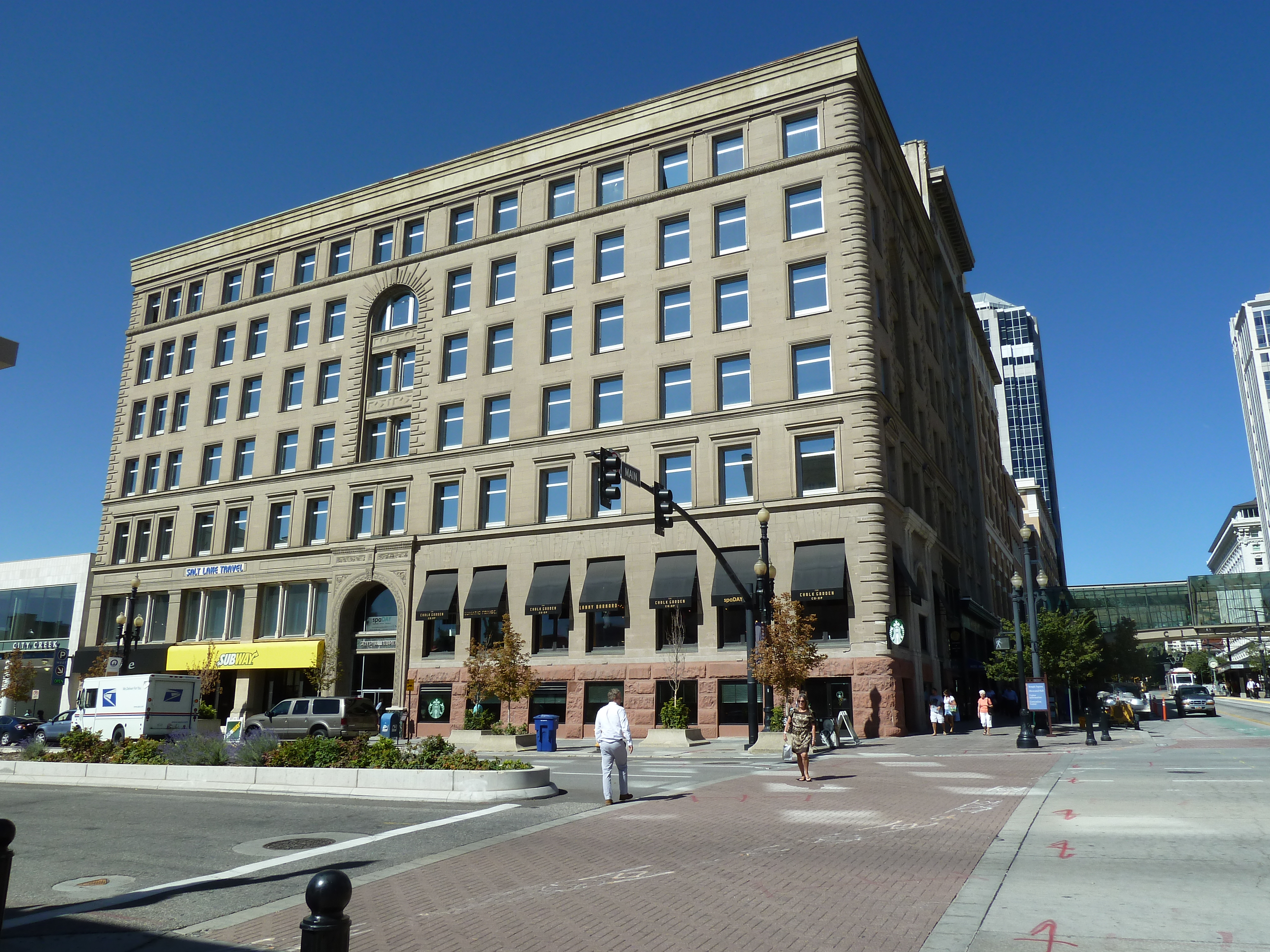

- Location within Utah Location within the United States
- Location: 10 W. 100 South, Salt Lake City, Utah
- Coordinates: 40°46′03″N 111°53′26″W
- Area: less than one acre
- Built: 1890
- Built by: William Pinney
- Architect: Mendelssohn, Fisher and Lawrie
- Architectural style: Early Commercial
- NRHP reference No.: 77001312
- Added to NRHP: August 24, 1977

The McCornick Building, at 10 W. 100 South in Salt Lake City, Utah, was built in 1890–93. It is also known as the Crandall Building. It was listed on the National Register of Historic Places in 1977.

== Description ==
The seven-story commercial building is one of few surviving from those built during Salt Lake City's building boom before the Panic of 1893.

It was built for William S. McCornick (1837-?), "a classic western entrepreneur whose business success mirrors the history of western economic development" who derived from a farm near Picton, Ontario, Canada, and who arrived in Salt Lake City in 1873.

It was deemed "an outstanding example of the transitional period of commercial architecture which anticipated Louis Sullivan's 'skyscraper' movement, originally situated among small one- and two-story stores which it dominated, the McCornick Block is significant as a precursor in the development of early modern architecture in Salt Lake City, as evident in the purely Sullivanesque McIntyre Building (National Register nominee) which adjoined the McCornick Block on the north in 1909."

It was designed by Louis Mendelssohn of architects Mendelssohn, Fisher and Lawrie, of Omaha, Nebraska. (Note: Its architect was stated to be a "Mr. Mendolson of Omaha, Nebraska" in its National Register nomination, and attributed to "Mendlessohn, Fisher & Laurie" by the 2005 Desert News article by Wadley. This is apparently Louis Mendelssohn of Mendelssohn, Fisher and Lawrie.)

It was owned and managed by Robert E. Crandall for 50 years.

== See also ==
- National Register of Historic Places listings in Salt Lake City
- Knutsford Hotel (1891), also in Salt Lake City and designed by Mendelssohn, Fisher and Lawrie
