= G. C. Moses Block =

- U.S. National Register of Historic Places
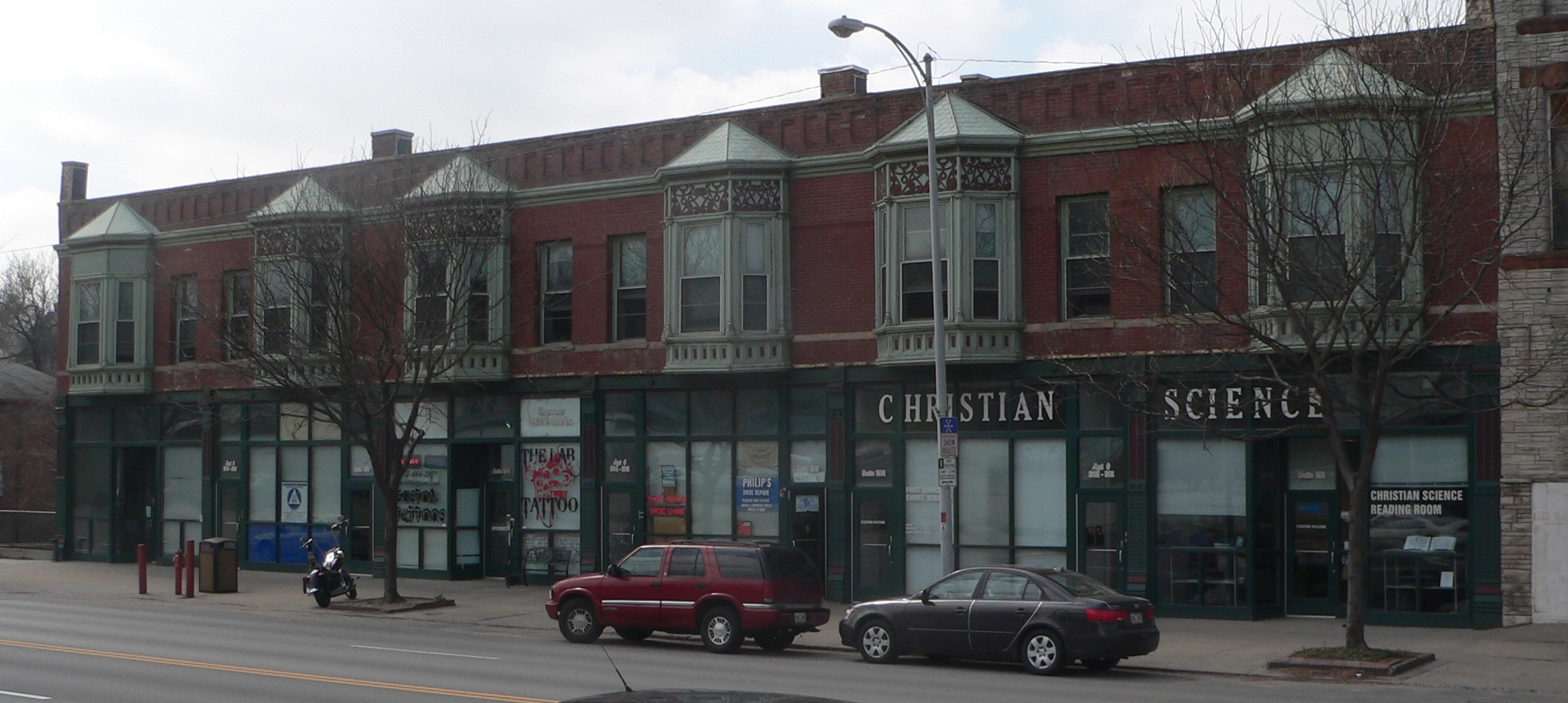
- Moses Block, seen from the northeast

- Location within Nebraska Location within the United States
- Location: 1234-1244 South 13th Street, Omaha, Nebraska
- Coordinates: 41°14′48″N 95°56′0.6″W
- Built: 1887
- Architect: Mendelssohn & Lawrie; Simonds & Linesay
- Architectural style: Late Victorian
- NRHP reference No.: 00000169
- Added to NRHP: March 9, 2000

The G. C. Moses Block is a row of several historic buildings located at 1234-1244 South 13th Street in Downtown Omaha, Nebraska. The two-story building was completed in 1887 by Mendelssohn & Lawrie and Simonds & Linesay, in the Late Victorian style of architecture.

It was built to be used as stores and flats (apartments). It is 125 by 60 feet (38 m × 18 m) in plan with bronze bay windows projecting out over the sidewalk on 13th St.
