= Kirschbraun and Sons Creamery, Inc. =

Historic place in Nebraska

- U.S. National Register of Historic Places
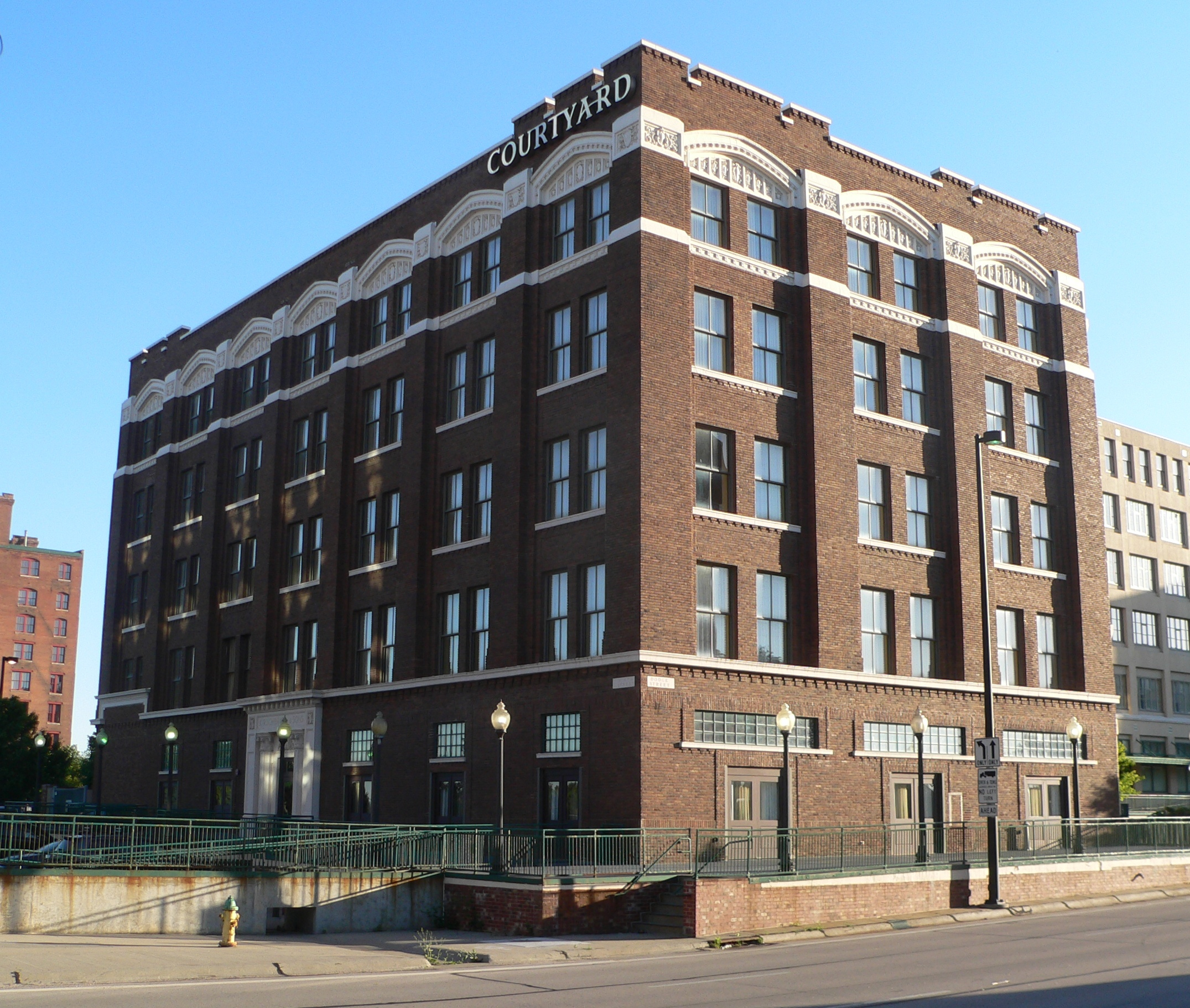
- View from the northeast

- Location within Nebraska Location within the United States
- Location: Omaha, Nebraska
- Coordinates: 41°15′34″N 95°55′42″W
- Built: 1917
- Architect: Harry Lawrie
- Architectural style: Early Commercial
- MPS: Warehouses in Omaha MPS
- NRHP reference No.: 98000894
- Added to NRHP: July 23, 1998

The Kirschbraun and Sons Creamery is located at 901 Dodge Street in Downtown Omaha, Nebraska.

It is a brick five-story commercial style warehouse with terra cotta details and an elaborate main entrance. The brickwork is simple brown bricks laid in running bond.
