= Howard Hanson House =

- U.S. National Register of Historic Places
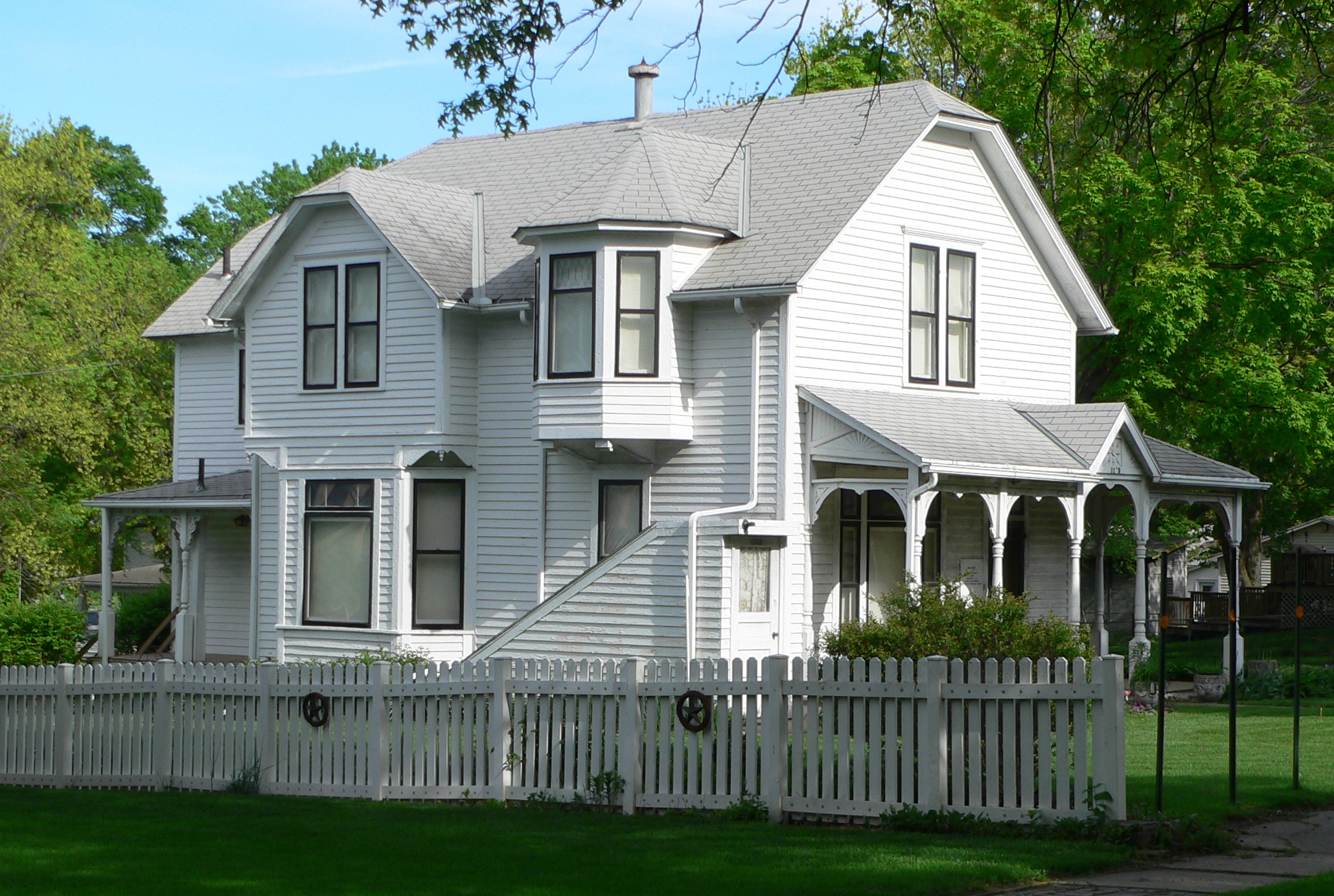
- The house in 2010

- Location within Nebraska Location within the United States
- Location: 12th and Linden Streets, Wahoo, Nebraska
- Coordinates: 41°12′59″N 96°37′07″W
- Area: less than one acre
- Built: 1888
- Architectural style: Queen Anne
- NRHP reference No.: 83001103
- Added to NRHP: January 27, 1983

The Howard Hanson House is a historic house in Wahoo, Nebraska, United States. It was built in 1888, and designed in the Queen Anne style. It was the childhood home of Howard Hanson, who served as the director of the University of Rochester's Eastman School of Music for four decades. Hanson's parents owned the house from 1891 to 1943. It was purchased by the Wahoo Women's Club in the 1960s and turned into a house museum. It has been listed on the National Register of Historic Places since January 27, 1983.
