= Montgomery County Jail (Red Oak, Iowa) =

- U.S. National Register of Historic Places
- Location within Iowa Location within the United States
- Location: 100 W. Coolbaugh St. Red Oak, Iowa
- Coordinates: 41°0′31″N 95°13′55″W
- Area: less than one acre
- Built: 1899
- Built by: Newman and Johnson
- Architect: Fisher and Lawrie
- Architectural style: Queen Anne; Colonial Revival
- MPS: Municipal, County, and State Corrections Properties in Iowa MPS
- NRHP reference No.: 92001661
- Added to NRHP: December 18, 1992

The Montgomery County Jail, also known as the Joint Law Enforcement Center, is located in Red Oak, Iowa, United States. Built in 2012, the facility houses administrative offices for the Montgomery County Sheriff's Department, the Red Oak Police Department, the Joint Communications Center and a 24-bed jail. The historic jail, built in 1899, was adjacent to the present building. It was listed on the National Register of Historic Places in 1992, and torn down after the new facility was built.

== History ==
The first county seat for Montgomery County was in Frankfort. It was transferred to Red Oak in 1865 and the present courthouse was built in 1890. By 1898 it was determined that the old jail was inadequate. A combination sheriff's house and jail was designed by the Omaha architectural firm of Fisher and Lawrie. It was built by Newman and Johnson, also from Omaha. The cells were bought from the Champion Iron Company. The sheriff's office was eventually moved to a separate facility, but the sheriff remained in residence until the summer of 1991. It was determined in the Fall of 2008 that the 1899 jail was inadequate. The decision was made to build a new facility rather than remodel the old jail. The Red Oak City Council agreed to pay $423,370 for the police department's section of the building. A $5.6 million referendum was passed on August 3, 2010 to build the new Joint Law Enforcement Center.
