= Wahoo Burlington Depot =

- U.S. National Register of Historic Places
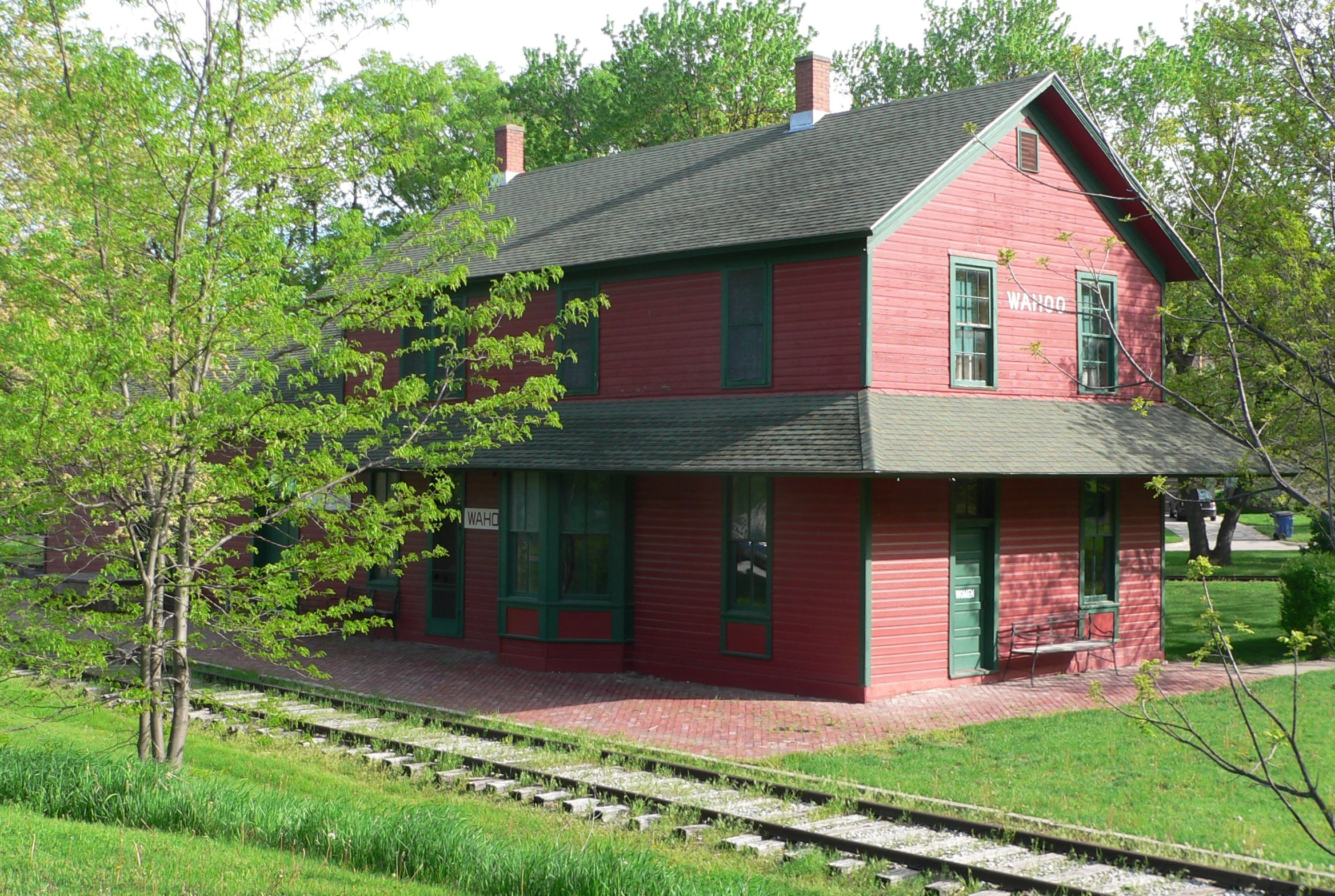
- The depot in 2010

- Location within Nebraska Location within the United States
- Location: 431 West 3rd, Wahoo, Nebraska
- Coordinates: 41°12′27″N 96°36′44″W
- Area: less than one acre
- Built: 1886
- Built by: Omaha & North Platte Railroad Co.
- NRHP reference No.: 85000955
- Added to NRHP: May 9, 1985

The Wahoo Burlington Depot is a historic two-story building in Wahoo, Nebraska. It was built in 1886 for the Omaha & North Platte Railroad Company, and painted in red and green. According to the National Register of Historic Places form, "it was leased to the Chicago, Burlington and Quincy Railroad in 1886 and later deeded to them in 1908. The CB&Q became the Burlington Northern Railroad in 1970. The depot closed in 1972 when a mobile agency was instituted and the tracks were abandoned three years later. Today, it is the only remaining depot of the three in Wahoo." It has been listed on the National Register of Historic Places since May 9, 1985.
