= Knutsford Hotel =

Former upscale hotel in Salt Lake City

Coordinates: 40.762709°N 111.888056°W

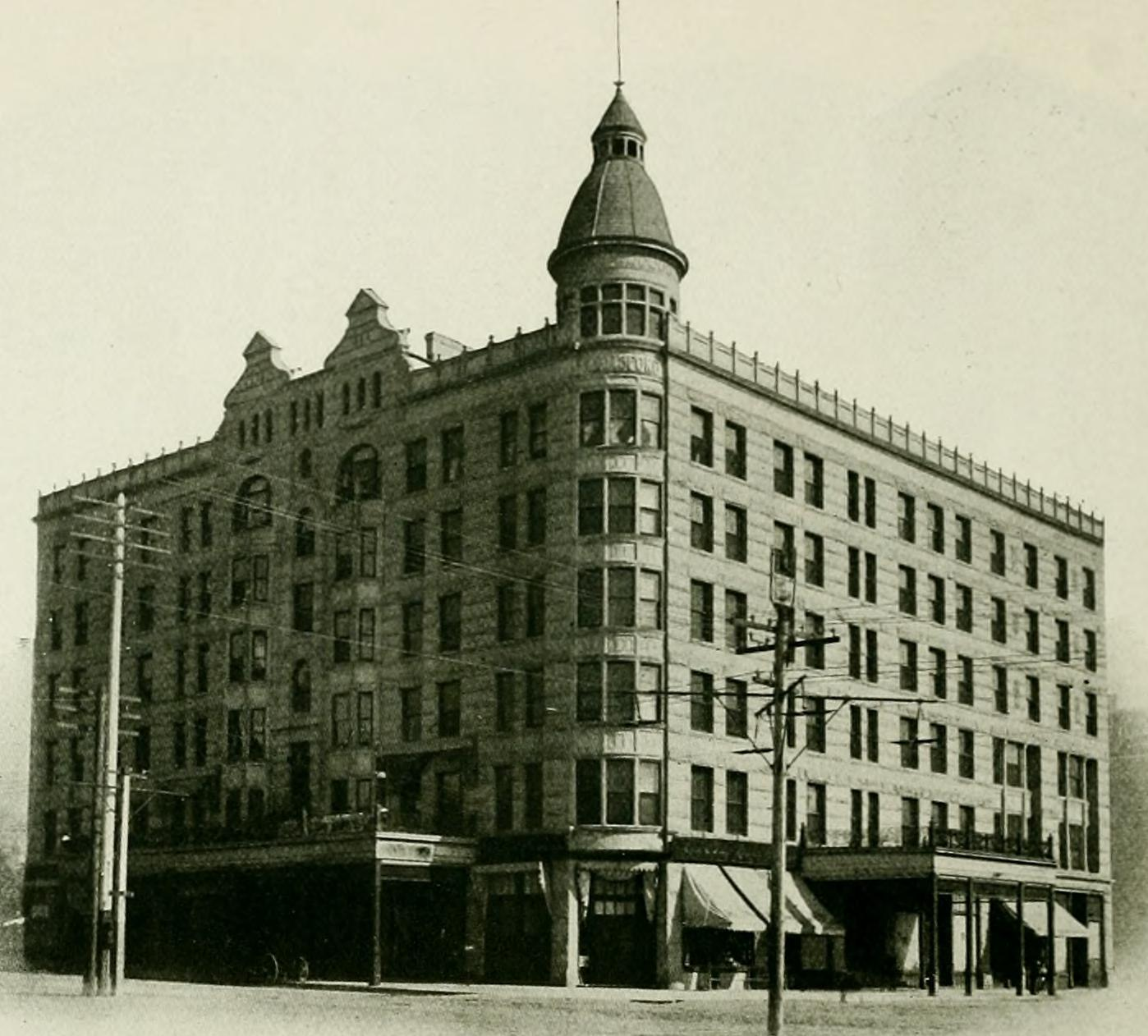
- The Knutsford Hotel in 1905

- Location within Utah

General information
- Location: Salt Lake City, Utah
- Opening: 1891
- Demolished: 1935

Technical details
- Floor count: 6

Design and construction
- Architect: Mendelssohn, Fisher and Lawrie

The Knutsford Hotel was an upscale hotel on the northeast corner of State Street and Third South (Broadway) in Salt Lake City, Utah. Historically, the site had been the location of the camp where the Mormons had planted their first crops.

The Knutsford Hotel was built in downtown Salt Lake City in 1891. The architects were the Omaha-based firm of Mendelssohn, Fisher and Lawrie. The general contractors, also from Omaha, were Rocheford & Gould. The hotel was a 132-foot-by-132-foot Victorian-influenced structure built primarily of granite at a cost of $750,000. The hotel had 250 rooms and was advertised as being completely fireproof. The hotel's unique name was in honor of the owner's birthplace in Knutsford, Cheshire, England. Gustavus S. Holmes was a one-time owner and operator of The Knutsford. Holmes also owned The Angelus in Los Angeles, California and would often advertise the hotels together. In 1912, The Knutsford was remodeled and converted into The Auerbach department store. The building housed the Sears Roebuck company's department store from 1928 to 1933.

The building was demolished in 1935 and replaced by new commercial buildings and a theatre.

== See also ==
- McCornick Building (1890–93), also in Salt Lake City and designed by Mendelssohn, Fisher and Lawrie
