= F. J. Kirchman House =

- U.S. National Register of Historic Places
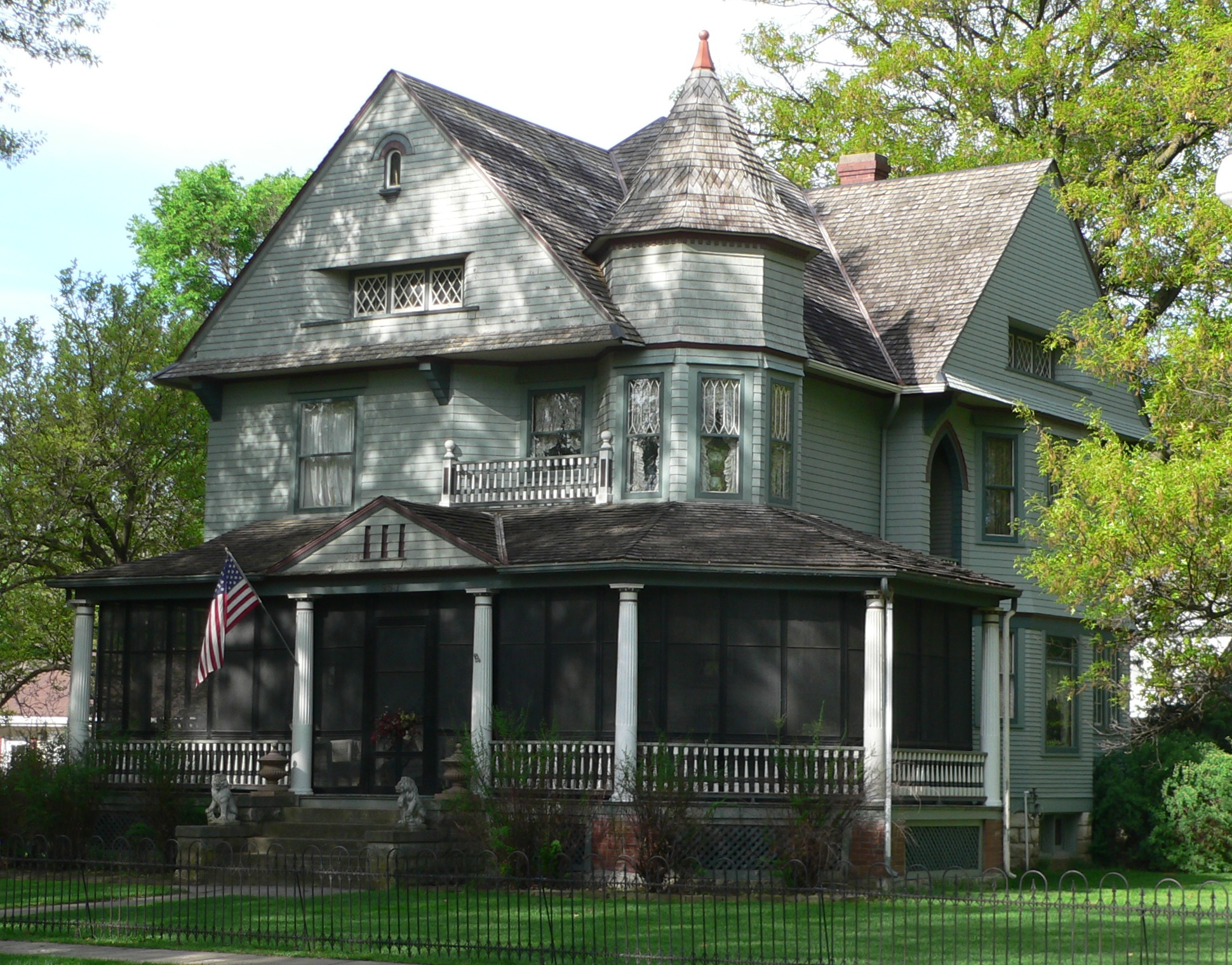
- The house in 2010

- Location within Nebraska Location within the United States
- Location: 957 Beech Street, Wahoo, Nebraska
- Coordinates: 41°12′52″N 96°37′02″W
- Area: less than one acre
- Built: 1903
- Built by: Johnson Crawford
- Architect: Jacob Ort
- Architectural style: Queen Anne
- NRHP reference No.: 03000796
- Added to NRHP: August 21, 2003

The F. J. Kirchman House is a historic house in Wahoo, Nebraska. It was built in 1903 for F. J. Kirchman, a banker who went to prison in 1930 because of his role in the Great Depression. The house was then purchased by Ernest Schiefelbein and his wife Jacqueline, who lived here until the 1950s. The house was originally designed in the Queen Anne architectural style by Jacob Ort, who had served in the Union Army's Battery "E", 1st Illinois Light Artillery Regiment during the Civil War before moving to Wahoo in 1878. It was moderately remodeled in the 1920s. It has been listed on the National Register of Historic Places since August 21, 2003.
