= Mendelssohn, Fisher and Lawrie =

American architecture firm

Mendelssohn, Fisher and Lawrie was a significant architecture firm in early Omaha, Nebraska. Fisher & Lawrie continued. A number of their works are listed on the National Register of Historic Places.

== History ==
Louis Mendelssohn was born in Berlin, Germany in 1842, and studied in New York City, United States before forming the partnership of Dufrene and Mendelssohn in Omaha in 1881. The pair were responsible for designing the 1884 Christian Specht Building in Downtown Omaha. The following year Mendelssohn left Dufrene to partner with George Fisher, with whom he operated a firm until 1886. Fisher was born in Michigan in 1856, and graduated from the University of Michigan in 1880 with a degree in civil engineering. Eventually, Harry Lawrie, born in Glasgow, Scotland in est 1858, who had nine years of experience in Glasgow and Edinburgh before immigrating to Chicago in 1883, moved to Omaha and joined the firm in 1887. During Omaha's building boom in the 1880s and 90s the firm designed several significant buildings. Mendelssohn left in 1893, leaving Fisher and Lawrie to continue until 1913.

Fisher died in 1931, and Lawrie died in 1935.

== Notable designs ==
- John A. Horbach Building - Built in 1894, it was named an Omaha Landmark in 1979, and was added to the NRHP.

Works by Durfene & Mendelssohn

- Christian Specht Building, built 1884, at 1110 Douglas St. Omaha, Nebraska (Durfene & Mendelssohn), NRHP-listed - Built in 1884, it was added to the NRHP in 1977.

Works by Mendelssohn & Lawrie

- G. C. Moses Block, built in 1887, at 1234-1244 S 13th St. Omaha, Nebraska (Mendelssohn & Lawrie), NRHP-listed
- Bemis Omaha Bag Company Building, built in 1887, at 614-624 S. 11th St. and 1102-1118 Jones St. Omaha, Nebraska (Mendelssohn & Lawrie), NRHP-listed, named an Omaha Landmark in 1978.

Works by Mendelssohn, Fisher & Lawrie

- Old University Library, 11th and R Sts. Lincoln, Nebraska (Mendelssohn, Fisher & Lawrie), NRHP-listed, Old Library - Located on the University of Nebraska–Lincoln, it was built in 1895 and added to the NRHP in 1975.
- Broatch Building - Built in 1880 and 1887, it was named an Omaha Landmark in 1983, and was added to the NRHP as a contributing building in the Old Market Historic District (Article says Mendelssohn, Fisher & Lawrie)
- Mason School - Built in 1888, it was added to the NRHP in 1986. (Article states Mendelssohn, Fisher & Lawrie; NRIS2010a version states Hadden, Rocheford & Gould; Et al., however Hadden, Rocheford, & Gould were the general contractors.)
- Minne Lusa Pumping Station - Built between 1888 and 1889, this classically styled building was built at the Florence Water Works. It was a massive building of Warrensburg sandstone with a central tower rising four stories over the arched entrance. The building housed the high service pump and huge boilers that filtered water flowed to the city water mains. It was demolished in the 1960s. (Mendelssohn, Fisher and Lawrie)
- Hicks Terrace, built in 1890, at 3005-3011 Pacific Street and 1102 South 30th Avenue in South Omaha, Nebraska. Named an Omaha Landmark in 1981. (Mendelssohn, Fisher & Lawrie)
- Knutsford Hotel, built in 1891 in Salt Lake City, Utah, this 132-foot-by-132-foot upscale hotel with 250 rooms was built completely of granite at a cost of $750,000. It was eventually converted to a department store before being demolished.
- McCornick Building (1890-93), 10 W. 100 South, Salt Lake City, Utah, NRHP-listed

Works by Fisher & Lawrie (1893–1913)

- Alfred H. and Sarah Frahm House, 220 S. 15th St. Fort Calhoun, Nebraska (Fisher and Lawrie), NRHP-listed
- Heber Hord House, 1505 Sixteenth St. Central City, Nebraska (Fisher & Lawrie), NRHP-listed
- Kennedy Building, built 1910, 1517 Jackson St. Omaha, Nebraska (Fisher & Lawrie), NRHP-listed
- Morton-James Public Library, 923 1st Corso Nebraska City, Nebraska (Fisher & Lawrie), NRHP-listed
- Sacred Heart Catholic Church - Built in 1902, it was added to the NRHP in 1983. (Fisher & Lawrie), NRHP-listed
- Saunders County Courthouse, Chestnut between 4th and 5th Sts. Wahoo, Nebraska (Fisher & Lawrie), NRHP-listed
- Schuyler Carnegie Library, 1003 B St. Schuyler, Nebraska (Fisher & Lawrie), NRHP-listed
- Montgomery County Jail, 100 W. Coolbaugh St. Red Oak, Iowa (Fischer & Lawrie), NRHP-listed

Works by Lawrie and others

- City National Bank Building and Creighton Orpheum Theater, 16th and Harney Sts. Omaha, Nebraska (Lawrie, Harry), NRHP-listed
- Dauphin County Courthouse, Jct. of Front and Market Sts. Harrisburg, Pennsylvania (Lawrie and Green), NRHP-listed
- Paul Gering House, 423 N. 6th St. Plattsmouth, Nebraska (Lawrie, Harry & W.E. Stockham), NRHP-listed
- Grand Army of the Republic (G.A.R.) Memorial Hall, 908 1st Corso Nebraska City, Nebraska (Lawrie, Harry), NRHP-listed
- Highspire High School, 221 Penn St. Highspire, Pennsylvania (Lawrie & Green), NRHP-listed
- Kirschbraun and Sons Creamery, Inc., 901 Dodge St. Omaha, Nebraska (Lawrie, Harry), NRHP-listed
- Pennsylvania Farm Show Complex & Expo Center, 2300 North Cameron Street Harrisburg, Pennsylvania (Lawrie & Green)
- Thos. D. Murphy Co. Factory and Power Plant, 110 S. 2nd St. Red Oak, Iowa (Lawrie, Harry), NRHP-listed
- Troy Public High School, 250 High St. Troy, Pennsylvania (Lawrie and Lappley), NRHP-listed
- World Theater, 1506 Douglas Street, Omaha, Nebraska (Lawrie, Harry, Supervising Architect of C. Howard Crane design), Razed 1980

== See also ==
- Architecture in Omaha, Nebraska
