= Woodcliff Burials =

Archaeological site in Saunders County, Nebraska

- U.S. National Register of Historic Places
- Nearest city: Inglewood, Nebraska
- Built: 1850
- NRHP reference No.: 73001075
- Added to NRHP: March 07, 1973

The Woodcliff Burials are an archaeological site located near Inglewood, Nebraska, United States. Located in the middle of farmland, the site was added to the National Register of Historic Places in 1973.
