= Saunders County Courthouse =

- U.S. National Register of Historic Places
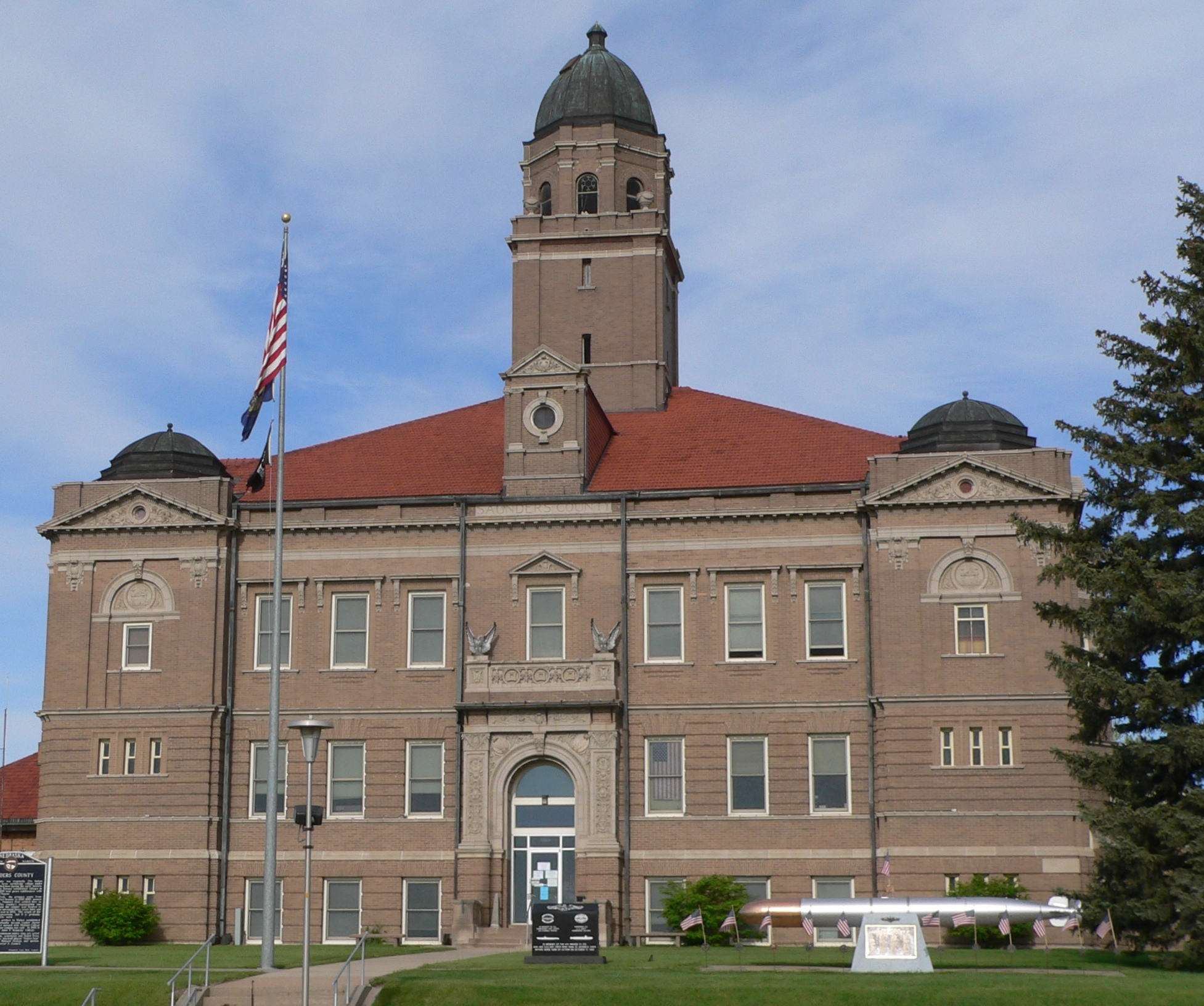
- The courthouse in 2010

- Location within Nebraska Location within the United States
- Location: Chestnut between 4th and 5th Sts., Wahoo, Nebraska
- Coordinates: 41°12′42″N 96°43′49″W
- Area: 1.4 acres (0.57 ha)
- Built: 1904
- Architect: Fisher & Lawrie
- Architectural style: Renaissance Revival
- MPS: County Courthouses of Nebraska MPS
- NRHP reference No.: 89002220
- Added to NRHP: January 10, 1990

The Saunders County Courthouse is a historic building in Wahoo, Nebraska, and the courthouse of Saunders County, Nebraska. It was built in 1904, and it was designed in the Renaissance Revival style by Fisher & Lawrie, an architectural firm based in Omaha. Architectural finishes include "Ornate, rich, dark woodwork (pediments with dentils, fluted Corinthian pilasters, paneling), stained glass (stylized organic patterns and geometric shapes), plasterwork (swags and wreaths, beams, dentils, acanthus consoles, moulding, Ionic capitals), marble in two colors (wainscoting, mopboard, stair treads), floor tile (in halls, of an elaborate pattern in six colors), brass newels (with urns and Ionic capitals)." It has been listed on the National Register of Historic Places since January 10, 1990.
