= College of Architecture (University of Nebraska–Lincoln) =

Architecture school at the University of Nebraska–Lincoln

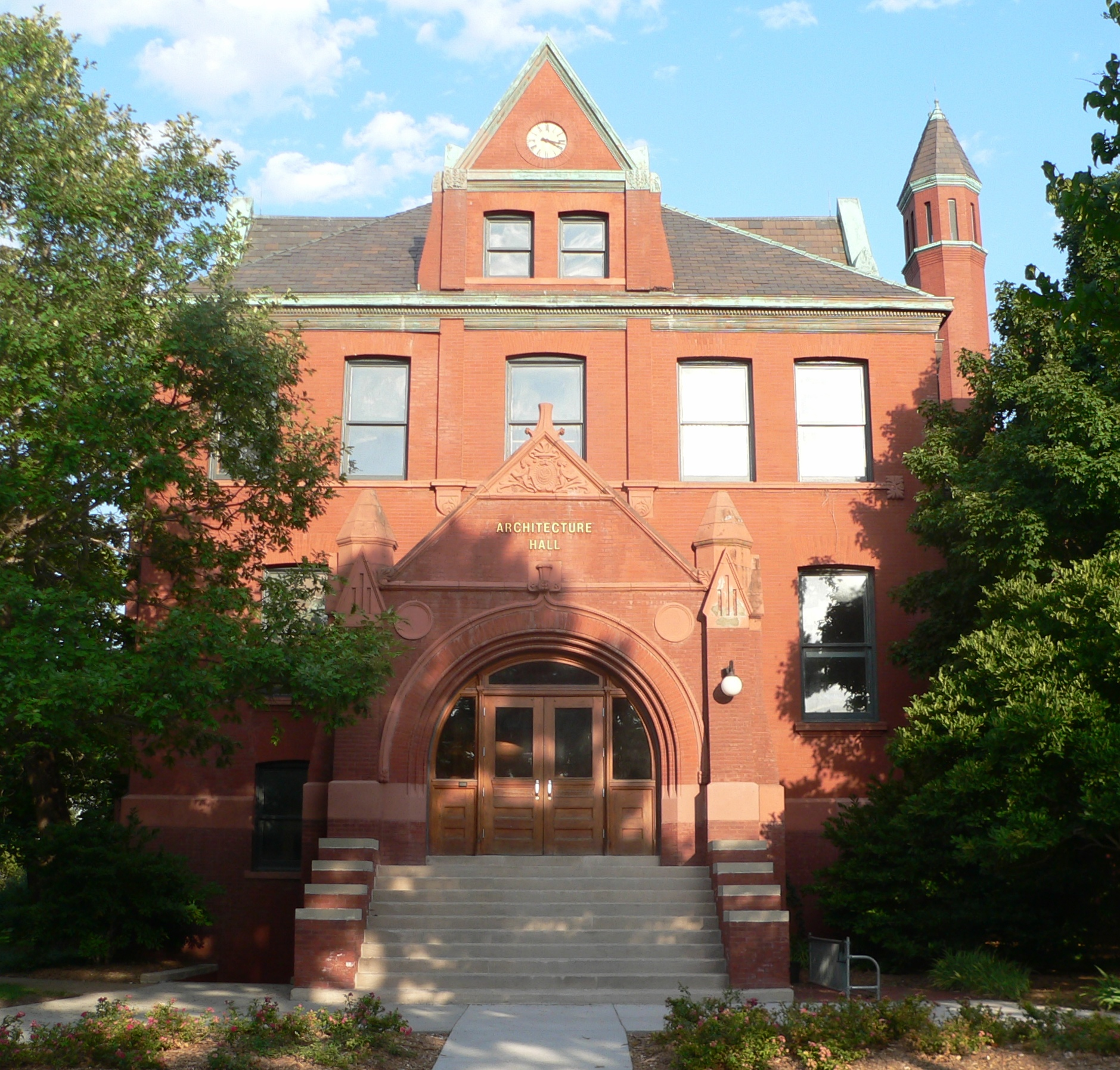
- Architecture Hall has housed the college since 1946
- Type: Public
- Established: 1973; 53 years ago
- Parent institution: University of Nebraska–Lincoln
- Affiliations: AIAS, APX, CIDA, LAAB, NAAB, NASAD, PAB
- Dean: Kevin Van Den Wymelenberg
- Faculty: 41 (2019)
- Students: 604 (2024)
- Location: Lincoln, Nebraska
- Campus: Urban
- Website: architecture.unl.edu
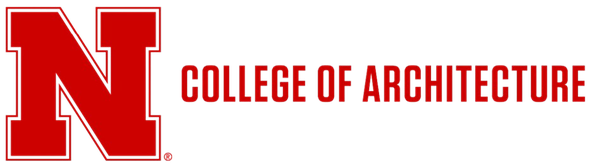

The College of Architecture is the school of architecture at the University of Nebraska–Lincoln in Lincoln, Nebraska. It was founded in 1973, nearly eighty years after the university offered its first architecture courses. Kevin Van Den Wymelenberg has served as dean since 2022.

The College of Architecture is one of nine colleges at NU and includes four departments: Architecture, Community and Regional Planning, Interior Design, and Landscape Architecture.

== History ==
The University of Nebraska offered its first architecture courses in the late 1890s under the tutelage of Alice Righter Edmiston. These classes were taught through Industrial College, NU's precursor to the College of Engineering, and a three-year architectural curriculum was soon established. In 1913, the College of Engineering began a four-year Architectural Engineering degree program, which later became the Department of Architecture. By 1947, the school was known as the College of Engineering and Architecture. The school was frequently relocated throughout the early- and mid-twentieth century, using the Mechanical Arts Building and the Temple Building before moving to what became Architecture Hall in 1946.

Enrollment in the Department of Architecture surpassed 300 in the late 1960s, and a standalone College of Architecture was formally established in 1973 under the direction of W. Cecil Steward, the youngest dean of an architectural college in the United States. Steward received acclaim for his expertise, demeanor, and role in creating a standalone architectural school, and became president of the American Institute of Architects before retiring from administration in 2000. The College of Law moved to East Campus in 1975; its original building was renovated and expanded over the following decade to become part of Architecture Hall.

Throughout the mid-2010s, there was consistent discussion about the College of Engineering reabsorbing the College of Architecture, the smallest of NU's nine colleges. When this proposal was rebuffed by engineering faculty, chancellor Harvey Perlman announced the College of Architecture would be merged with the Hixson–Lied College of Fine and Performing Arts. The proposal was quickly scrapped when Perlman announced his retirement months later.

In 2022, the school began a two-phase redevelopment of its architectural facilities, with special consideration necessary to protect the historical integrity of Architecture Hall. A new space on the north side of the structure was named HDR Pavilion after the Omaha-based engineering firm that was a significant donor to the project.

== Programs ==
- Bachelor of Science degrees: Architecture, Interior Design, Landscape Architecture
- Master of Science degrees: Architecture (two- or three-year), Community and Regional Planning, Public Health, Urban Design
- Minors: Community and Regional Planning, Environmental Engineering, Landscape Architecture, Product Design, Transportation Engineering, Water Resources Engineering

== People ==
=== Deans ===
| No. | Dean | Tenure |
|---|---|---|
| 1 | W. Cecil Steward | 1973–2000 |
| 2 | Wayne Drummond | 2000–2010 |
| Interim deans | | 2010–2016 |
| 3 | Katharine Ankerson | 2016–2022 |
| 4 | Kevin Van Den Wymelenberg | 2022–present |

=== Notable alumni ===
This list includes those who graduated with an architectural degree before the formal establishment of the College of Architecture.

- Golden J. Zenon Jr. (B. Arch. 1955) – founder of Zenon Beringer & Associates
- Charles F. McAfee (B. Arch. 1958) – building material manufacturer and housing activist
- Erleen Hatfield (B. S. 1991) – structural engineer of record for New Atlanta Stadium
- Gordon Stotz (M. S. 2012) – art director
