= Highspire, Pennsylvania =

Borough in Pennsylvania, US

- Borough
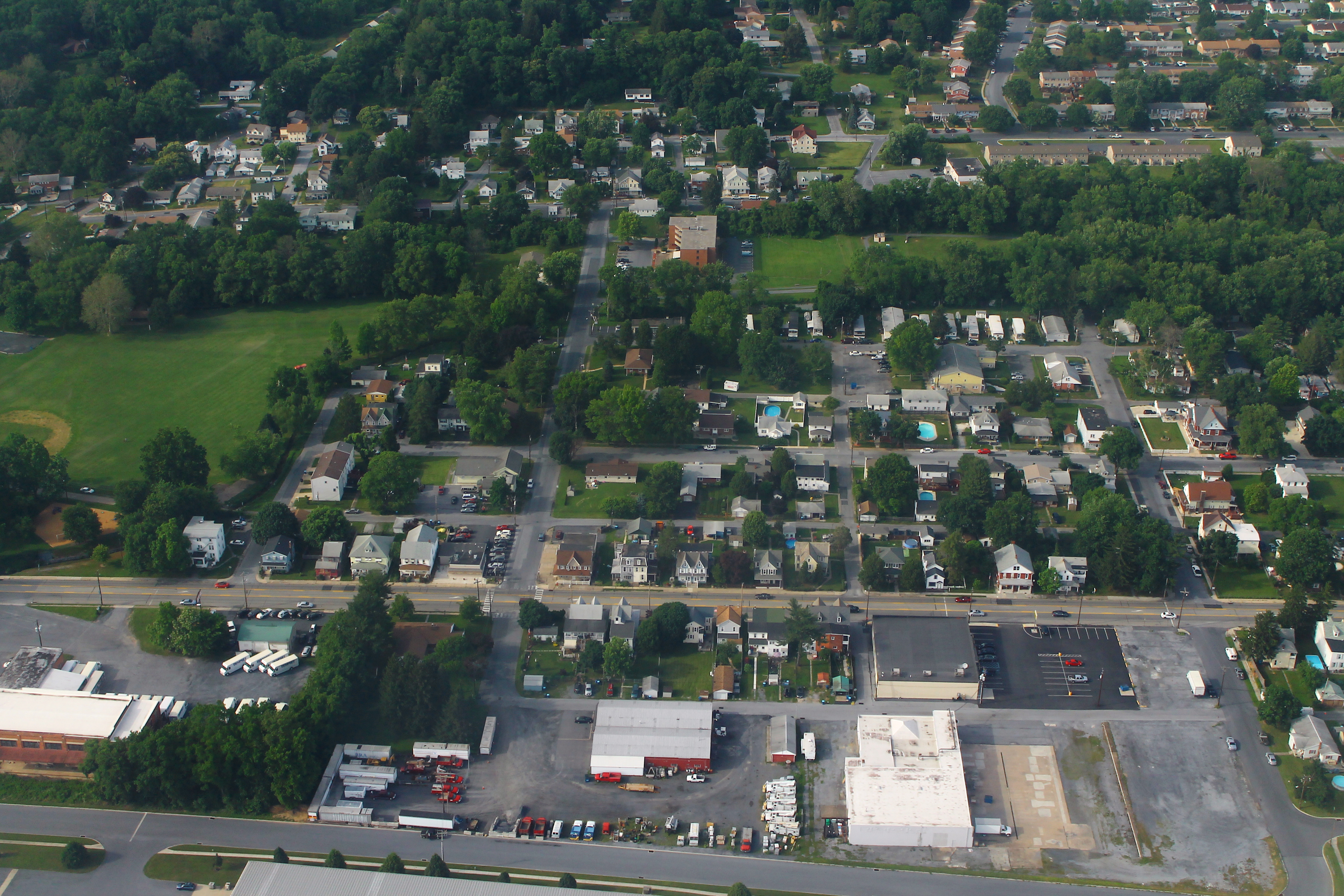
- Aerial view of Highspire

- Location in Dauphin County and the U.S. state of Pennsylvania.

- Location in Pennsylvania Location in United States
- Coordinates: 40°12′27″N 76°47′05″W
- Country: United States
- State: Pennsylvania
- County: Dauphin
- Settled: 1814
- Incorporated: 1867

Government
  - Type: Borough Council

Area
  - Total: 0.74 sq mi (1.92 km^{2})
  - Land: 0.72 sq mi (1.86 km^{2})
  - Water: 0.023 sq mi (0.06 km^{2})
- Elevation: 312 ft (95 m)

Population (2020)
  - Total: 2,741
  - Density: 3,813.2/sq mi (1,472.27/km^{2})
- Time zone: UTC-5 (Eastern (EST))
  - Summer (DST): UTC-4 (EDT)
- ZIP code: 17034
- Area code: 717
- FIPS code: 42-34664
- Website: highspire.gov

Highspire is a borough in Dauphin County, Pennsylvania, United States. The population was 2,741 at the 2020 census, an increase over the figure of 2,399 tabulated in 2010. It is part of the Harrisburg–Carlisle Metropolitan Statistical Area.

== History ==
In 1814, the town was laid out by two Germans named Barnes and Doughterman who emigrated from a small village named Spire in Bavaria. It is debated as to whether the town was named for the high spire of the church that could be seen from the Susquehanna River, or for the village of Spire. The town's location along the Pennsylvania Canal system and Susquehanna River made it a prime location for a variety of industries including logging, candy and potato chip factories, whiskey distilling, boat building, knitting and milling.

The Highspire High School was added to the National Register of Historic Places in 1990.

== Geography ==
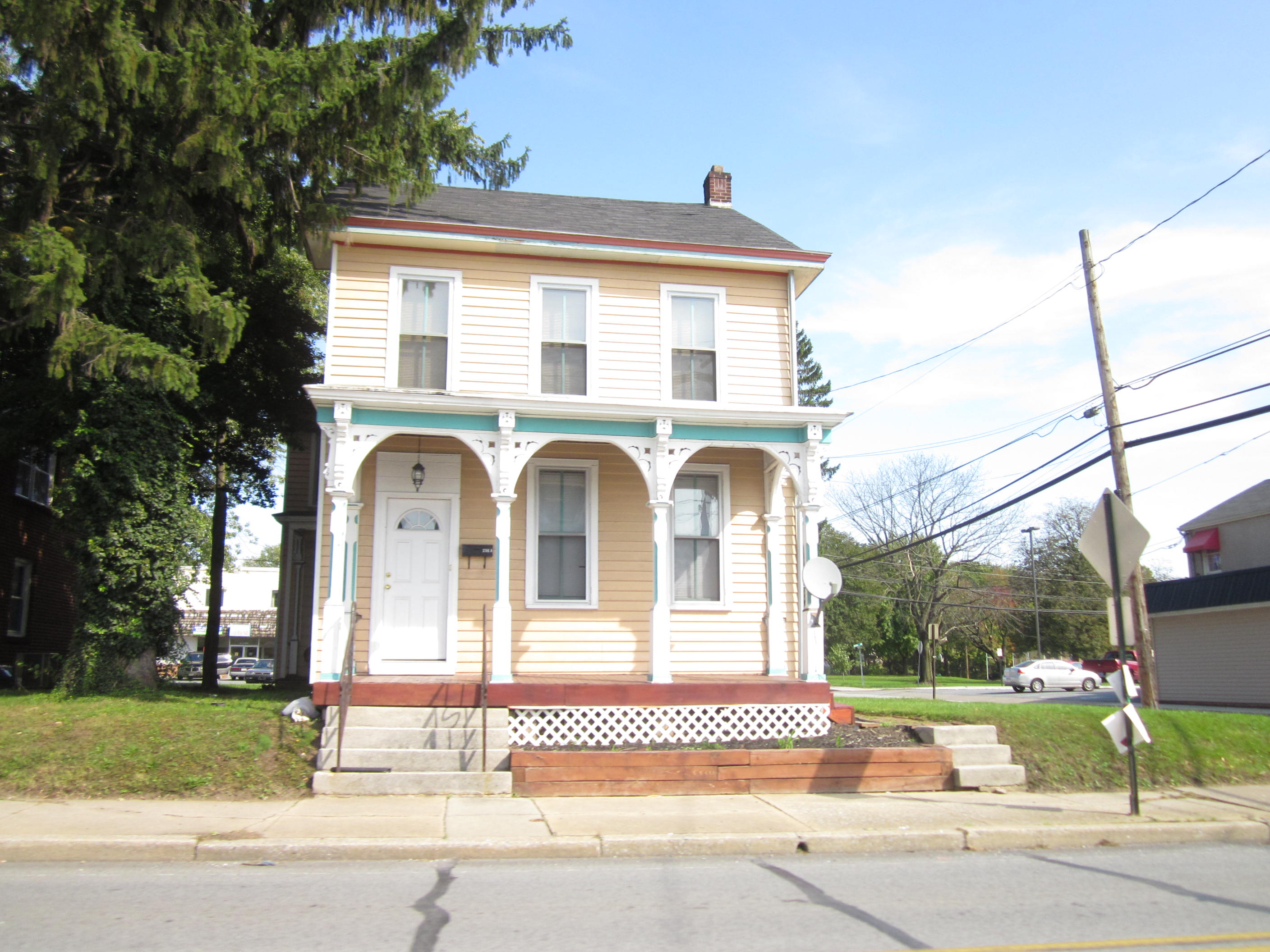

Highspire is located in southern Dauphin County at 40°12′27″N 76°47′5″W (40.207622, -76.784698), on the northeast bank of the Susquehanna River between the towns of Steelton and Middletown. Interstate 76, the Pennsylvania Turnpike, curves around the west and north sides of the borough, with indirect access from Exit 247 (Interstate 283). Pennsylvania Route 230 (Second Street) is the main road through the borough, leading northwest 7 miles (11 km) through Steelton to Harrisburg and southeast 3 miles (5 km) to Middletown and 11 miles (18 km) to Elizabethtown.

According to the United States Census Bureau, the borough has a total area of 0.74 square miles (1.92 km^{2}), of which 0.72 square miles (1.86 km^{2}) is land and 0.02 square miles (0.06 km^{2}), or 2.96%, is water.

== Notable person ==
The American actor Don Keefer (1916–2014) was born in Highspire.

== Demographics ==
Historical population
Census	Pop.	Note	%±
1830	172		—
1850	291		—
1870	612		—
1880	752		22.9%
1910	1,669		—
1920	2,031		21.7%
1930	2,327		14.6%
1940	2,371		1.9%
1950	2,799		18.1%
1960	2,999		7.1%
1970	2,947		−1.7%
1980	2,959		0.4%
1990	2,668		−9.8%
2000	2,720		1.9%
2010	2,399		−11.8%
2020	2,741		14.3%

As of the census of 2000, there were 2,720 people, 1,279 households, and 689 families residing in the borough. The population density was 3,762.6 inhabitants per square mile (1,452.7/km^{2}). There were 1,373 housing units at an average density of 1,899.3/sq mi (733.3/km^{2}). The racial makeup of the borough was 86.62% White, 8.20% African American, 0.11% Native American, 0.88% Asian, 2.17% from other races, and 2.02% from two or more races. Hispanic or Latino of any race were 5.11% of the population.

There were 1,279 households, out of which 22.7% had children under the age of 18 living with them, 37.3% were married couples living together, 12.0% had a female householder with no husband present, and 46.1% were non-families. 38.2% of all households were made up of individuals, and 13.5% had someone living alone who was 65 years of age or older. The average household size was 2.13 and the average family size was 2.83.

In the borough the population was spread out, with 19.8% under the age of 18, 9.6% from 18 to 24, 32.8% from 25 to 44, 22.6% from 45 to 64, and 15.2% who were 65 years of age or older. The median age was 37 years. For every 100 females, there were 92.8 males. For every 100 females age 18 and over, there were 90.0 males.

The median income for a household in the borough was $32,083, and the median income for a family was $40,398. Males had a median income of $31,269 versus $24,188 for females. The per capita income for the borough was $18,781. About 5.1% of families and 10.4% of the population were below the poverty line, including 9.2% of those under age 18 and 12.3% of those age 65 or over.
