= Inglewood, Nebraska =

- Village
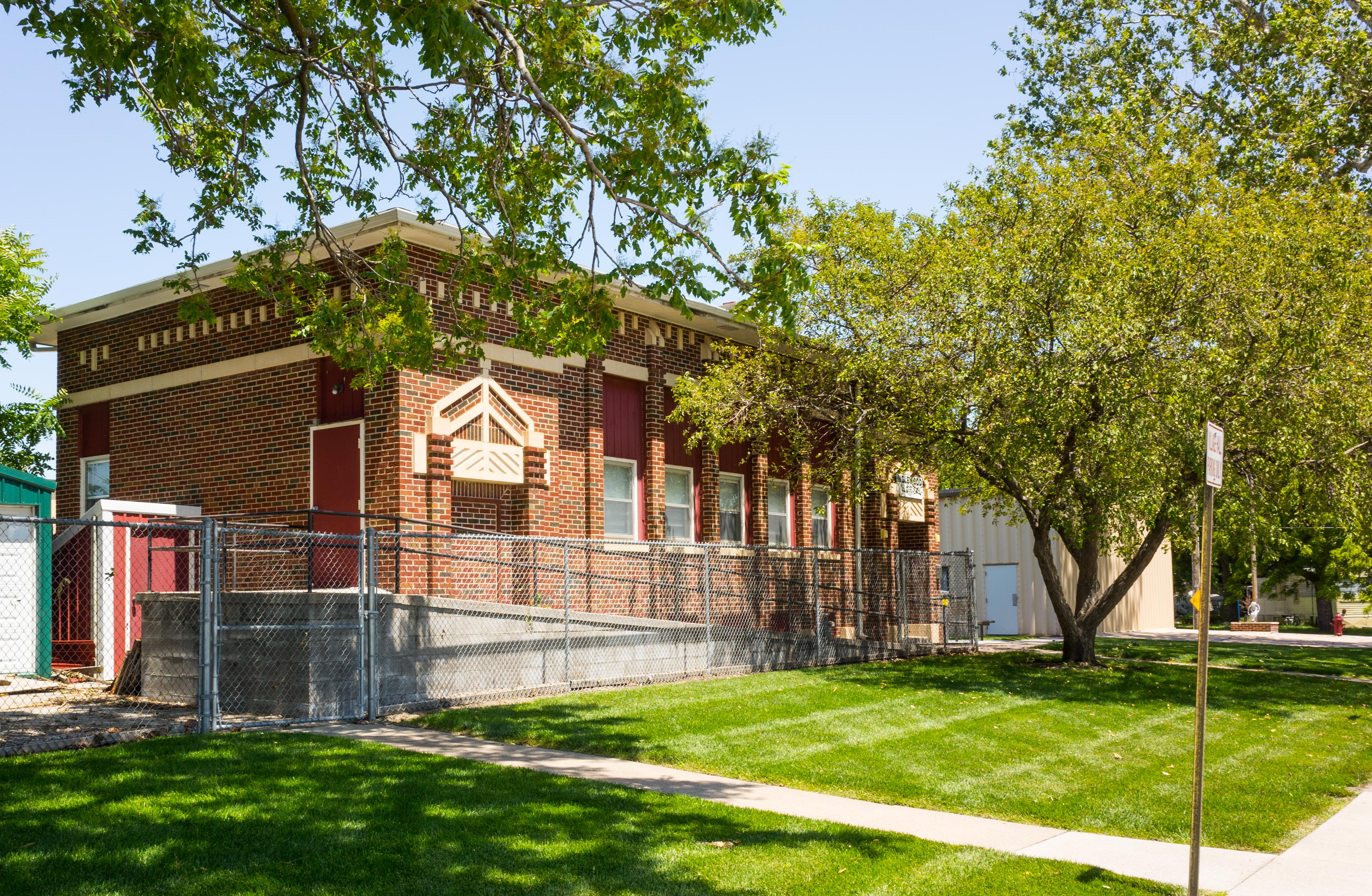
- Nickname:"Fringlewood"

- Location of Inglewood, Nebraska
- Coordinates: 41°24′57″N 96°30′08″W
- Country: United States
- State: Nebraska
- County: Dodge

Area
  - Total: 0.27 sq mi (0.70 km^{2})
  - Land: 0.27 sq mi (0.70 km^{2})
  - Water: 0 sq mi (0.00 km^{2})
- Elevation: 1,194 ft (364 m)

Population (2020)
  - Total: 380
  - Density: 1,406.1/sq mi (542.91/km^{2})
- Time zone: UTC-6 (Central (CST))
  - Summer (DST): UTC-5 (CDT)
- ZIP code: 68025
- Area codes: 402 and 531
- FIPS code: 31-23970
- GNIS feature ID: 2398575
- Website: www.villageofinglewood.net

Inglewood is a village in Dodge County, Nebraska, United States. As of the 2020 census, Inglewood had a population of 380.

== History ==
Inglewood was platted in 1918, and named after the city of Inglewood, California.

== Geography ==
According to the United States Census Bureau, the village has a total area of 0.24 square miles (0.62 km^{2}), all land.

== Demographics ==
Historical population
Census	Pop.	Note	%±
1960	805		—
1970	275		−65.8%
1980	257		−6.5%
1990	286		11.3%
2000	382		33.6%
2010	325		−14.9%
2020	380		16.9%
U.S. Decennial Census

=== 2010 census ===
As of the census of 2010, there were 325 people, 134 households, and 90 families living in the village. The population density was 1,354.2 inhabitants per square mile (522.9/km^{2}). There were 146 housing units at an average density of 608.3 per square mile (234.9/km^{2}). The racial makeup of the village was 86.2% White, 0.6% African American, 0.9% Native American, 0.3% Asian, 10.5% from other races, and 1.5% from two or more races. Hispanic or Latino of any race were 14.5% of the population.

There were 134 households, of which 28.4% had children under the age of 18 living with them, 51.5% were married couples living together, 9.7% had a female householder with no husband present, 6.0% had a male householder with no wife present, and 32.8% were non-families. 26.1% of all households were made up of individuals, and 8.2% had someone living alone who was 65 years of age or older. The average household size was 2.43 and the average family size was 2.94.

The median age in the village was 39.3 years. 23.4% of residents were under the age of 18; 6.4% were between the ages of 18 and 24; 25.8% were from 25 to 44; 27.8% were from 45 to 64; and 16.6% were 65 years of age or older. The gender makeup of the village was 48.9% male and 51.1% female.

=== 2000 census ===
As of the census of 2000, there were 382 people, 154 households, and 103 families living in the village. The population density was 1,616.1 inhabitants per square mile (624.0/km^{2}). There were 161 housing units at an average density of 681.1 per square mile (263.0/km^{2}). The racial makeup of the village was 97.64% White, 1.83% from other races, and 0.52% from two or more races. Hispanic or Latino of any race were 2.62% of the population.

There were 154 households, out of which 27.9% had children under the age of 18 living with them, 48.1% were married couples living together, 11.0% had a female householder with no husband present, and 33.1% were non-families. 22.7% of all households were made up of individuals, and 5.8% had someone living alone who was 65 years of age or older. The average household size was 2.48 and the average family size was 2.93.

In the village, the population was spread out, with 23.8% under the age of 18, 10.7% from 18 to 24, 27.5% from 25 to 44, 25.1% from 45 to 64, and 12.8% who were 65 years of age or older. The median age was 37 years. For every 100 females, there were 120.8 males. For every 100 females age 18 and over, there were 109.4 males.

As of 2000 the median income for a household in the village was $34,063, and the median income for a family was $38,409. Males had a median income of $26,518 versus $19,375 for females. The per capita income for the village was $14,675. About 4.4% of families and 9.1% of the population were below the poverty line, including 11.9% of those under age 18 and 12.3% of those age 65 or over.
