= Ashland, Nebraska =

City in Saunders County, Nebraska, United States

- City
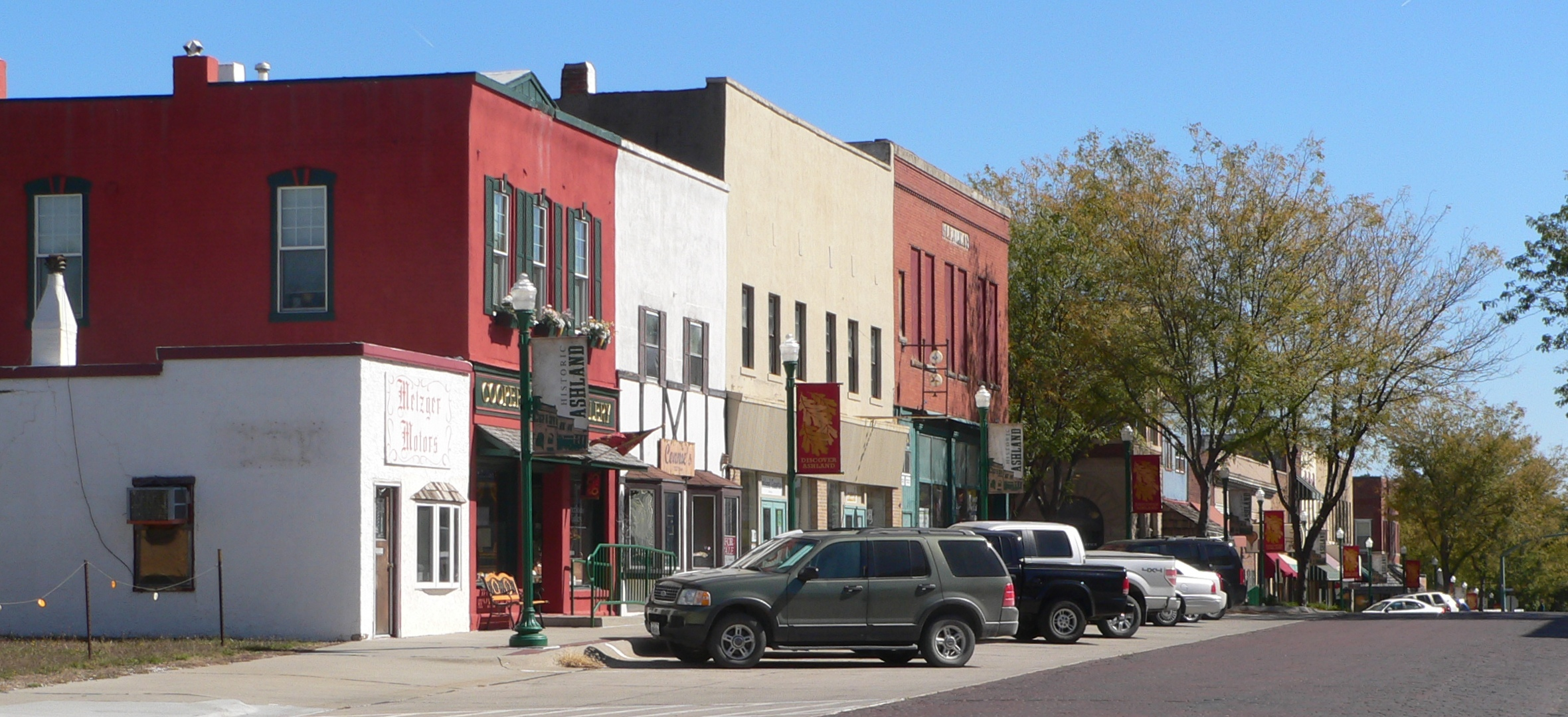
- Downtown Ashland: Silver Street

- Flag Logo

- Location of Ashland, Nebraska
- Coordinates: 41°02′26″N 96°22′40″W
- Country: United States
- State: Nebraska
- County: Saunders

Area
  - Total: 1.41 sq mi (3.65 km^{2})
  - Land: 1.38 sq mi (3.58 km^{2})
  - Water: 0.027 sq mi (0.07 km^{2})
- Elevation: 1,093 ft (333 m)

Population (2020)
  - Total: 3,086
  - Density: 2,231.5/sq mi (861.57/km^{2})
- Time zone: UTC-6 (Central (CST))
  - Summer (DST): UTC-5 (CDT)
- ZIP code: 68003
- Area code: 402
- FIPS code: 31-02305
- GNIS feature ID: 2394000
- Website: www.cityofashlandne.gov

Ashland is a city in Saunders County, Nebraska, United States. The population was 3,262 at the 2022 census.

== History ==
Ashland is located at the site of a low-water limestone ledge along the bottom of Salt Creek, an otherwise mud-bottomed stream that was a formidable obstacle for wagon trains on the great westward migrations of the late 1840s and 1850s. The Oxbow Trail, a variant route of the Oregon Trail, ran from Nebraska City (on the Missouri River) to Fort Kearny (on the Platte River), where it joined the main route of the Oregon Trail. The limestone bottom of Salt Creek at Ashland made it an excellent fording site. Ashland was established in 1870 and named after Ashland, the estate of Henry Clay.

Today, Ashland benefits by its proximity to Interstate 80 and the cities of Omaha and Lincoln. While in some respects Ashland is becoming a "bedroom community" of those much larger cities, it retains a rural character. That coherence as a community, and a 30-minute drive to either of the state's economic hubs, has led to a building boom in the late 1990s and the 2000s.

== Geography ==
According to the United States Census Bureau, the city has a total area of 1.13 square miles (2.93 km^{2}), of which 1.10 square miles (2.85 km^{2}) is land and 0.03 square miles (0.08 km^{2}) is water. The town itself sits in a basin where the Wahoo Creek, Silver Creek, and Salt Creek all converge. This has been known for causing intense flooding problems for the town and making it susceptible to severe damage. In October of 2026, the Salt Creek rose to 21.1 feet above normal, causing the water to flood campgrounds and areas surrounding the downtown, school district, and homes and farmland. All county dirt roads leading to the town were closed. Both the 2019 and 2026 floods were major indicators of the town’s unfortunate geography..

=== Climate ===
Climate data for Ashland, Nebraska (1991–2020 normals, extremes 1893–2018)
Month	Jan	Feb	Mar	Apr	May	Jun	Jul	Aug	Sep	Oct	Nov	Dec	Year
Record high °F (°C)	72 (22)	80 (27)	91 (33)	98 (37)	107 (42)	109 (43)	116 (47)	115 (46)	108 (42)	97 (36)	85 (29)	72 (22)	116 (47)
Mean daily maximum °F (°C)	32.7 (0.4)	37.7 (3.2)	50.6 (10.3)	62.6 (17.0)	73.3 (22.9)	83.2 (28.4)	87.2 (30.7)	85.2 (29.6)	78.5 (25.8)	65.4 (18.6)	49.8 (9.9)	37.1 (2.8)	61.9 (16.6)
Daily mean °F (°C)	23.0 (−5.0)	27.4 (−2.6)	39.1 (3.9)	50.4 (10.2)	61.7 (16.5)	72.3 (22.4)	76.4 (24.7)	74.1 (23.4)	65.9 (18.8)	53.2 (11.8)	38.9 (3.8)	27.7 (−2.4)	50.8 (10.4)
Mean daily minimum °F (°C)	13.3 (−10.4)	17.0 (−8.3)	27.6 (−2.4)	38.2 (3.4)	50.1 (10.1)	61.5 (16.4)	65.6 (18.7)	63.0 (17.2)	53.4 (11.9)	40.9 (4.9)	28.1 (−2.2)	18.4 (−7.6)	39.8 (4.3)
Record low °F (°C)	−33 (−36)	−33 (−36)	−21 (−29)	3 (−16)	24 (−4)	35 (2)	41 (5)	38 (3)	23 (−5)	3 (−16)	−15 (−26)	−27 (−33)	−33 (−36)
Average precipitation inches (mm)	0.85 (22)	0.98 (25)	1.67 (42)	3.18 (81)	5.19 (132)	4.48 (114)	3.68 (93)	3.96 (101)	3.19 (81)	2.40 (61)	1.42 (36)	1.29 (33)	32.29 (820)
Average snowfall inches (cm)	5.7 (14)	6.2 (16)	3.2 (8.1)	0.9 (2.3)	0.0 (0.0)	0.0 (0.0)	0.0 (0.0)	0.0 (0.0)	0.0 (0.0)	0.6 (1.5)	0.7 (1.8)	4.8 (12)	22.1 (56)
Average precipitation days (≥ 0.01 in)	4.4	4.6	5.8	8.5	10.9	9.2	8.1	8.1	6.4	6.4	4.4	4.5	81.3
Average snowy days (≥ 0.1 in)	3.2	3.4	1.3	0.4	0.0	0.0	0.0	0.0	0.0	0.2	0.8	2.3	11.6
Source: NOAA

== Demographics ==
Historical population
Census	Pop.	Note	%±
1870	653		—
1880	978		49.8%
1890	1,601		63.7%
1900	1,477		−7.7%
1910	1,379		−6.6%
1920	1,725		25.1%
1930	1,786		3.5%
1940	1,709		−4.3%
1950	1,713		0.2%
1960	1,989		16.1%
1970	2,176		9.4%
1980	2,274		4.5%
1990	2,136		−6.1%
2000	2,262		5.9%
2010	2,453		8.4%
2020	3,086		25.8%
U.S. Decennial Census

=== 2020 census ===
As of the 2020 census, Ashland had a population of 3,086. The median age was 38.2 years. 25.9% of residents were under the age of 18 and 17.8% of residents were 65 years of age or older. For every 100 females there were 96.2 males, and for every 100 females age 18 and over there were 95.2 males age 18 and over.

0.0% of residents lived in urban areas, while 100.0% lived in rural areas.

There were 1,249 households in Ashland, of which 31.3% had children under the age of 18 living in them. Of all households, 46.7% were married-couple households, 19.1% were households with a male householder and no spouse or partner present, and 26.1% were households with a female householder and no spouse or partner present. About 30.9% of all households were made up of individuals and 15.3% had someone living alone who was 65 years of age or older.

There were 1,378 housing units, of which 9.4% were vacant. The homeowner vacancy rate was 3.2% and the rental vacancy rate was 6.5%.

Racial composition as of the 2020 census
Race	Number	Percent
White	2,770	89.8%
Black or African American	12	0.4%
American Indian and Alaska Native	26	0.8%
Asian	18	0.6%
Native Hawaiian and Other Pacific Islander	4	0.1%
Some other race	52	1.7%
Two or more races	204	6.6%
Hispanic or Latino (of any race)	107	3.5%

=== 2010 census ===
At the 2010 census there were 2,453 people, 951 households, and 639 families living in the city. The population density was 2,230.0 inhabitants per square mile (861.0/km^{2}). There were 1,060 housing units at an average density of 963.6 units per square mile (372.0 units/km^{2}). The racial makeup of the city was 97.6% White, 0.2% African American, 0.2% Native American, 0.2% Asian, 0.3% from other races, and 1.5% from two or more races. Hispanic or Latino individuals of any race were 2.6%.

Of the 951 households 34.8% had children under the age of 18 living with them, 50.7% were married couples living together, 11.5% had a female householder with no husband present, 5.0% had a male householder with no wife present, and 32.8% were non-families. 26.1% of households were one person and 12.5% were one person aged 65 or older. The average household size was 2.49 and the average family size was 3.00.

The median age was 37 years. 26.1% of residents were under the age of 18; 8.5% were between the ages of 18 and 24; 24.8% were from 25 to 44; 24.7% were from 45 to 64; and 15.9% were 65 or older. The gender makeup of the city was 49.7% male and 50.3% female.

=== 2000 census ===
At the 2000 census, there were 2,262 people, 877 households, and 591 families living in the city. The population density was 2,130.2 inhabitants per square mile (822.5/km^{2}). There were 930 housing units at an average density of 875.8 units per square mile (338.1 units/km^{2}). The racial makeup of the city was 98.76% White, 0.13% African American, 0.27% Native American, 0.40% Asian, 0.18% from other races, and 0.27% from two or more races. Hispanic or Latino individuals of any race were 1.64% of the population.

Of the 877 households 33.8% had children under the age of 18 living with them, 53.5% were married couples living together, 10.8% had a female householder with no husband present, and 32.6% were non-families. 26.7% of households were one person and 15.4% were one person aged 65 or older. The average household size was 2.47 and the average family size was 3.01.

The age distribution was 25.7% under the age of 18, 7.4% from 18 to 24, 28.3% from 25 to 44, 20.3% from 45 to 64, and 18.2% 65 or older. The median age was 38 years. For every 100 females, there were 88.5 males. For every 100 females age 18 and over, there were 89.0 males.

The median household income was $40,441, and the median family income was $47,428. Males had a median income of $32,339 versus $21,328 for females. The per capita income for the city was $19,072. About 9.3% of families and 9.5% of the population were below the poverty line, including 13.6% of those under age 18 and 9.6% of those age 65 or over.

== Business and industry ==
Employers in the Ashland area include Ashland Brewing Company, Innovative Laboratory Systems, Linoma Software, Camp Ashland (Nebraska Army National Guard Training Center), and Trade Well Pallet.

== Notable people ==
Ashland is the hometown of astronaut Clayton Anderson.

Ashland is the hometown of Jeff Raikes, former chief executive officer of the Bill & Melinda Gates Foundation.

== See also ==
- List of municipalities in Nebraska

== Additional reading ==
- Saunders County History (1983)
- Andreas' History of the State of Nebraska
- Ashland Historical Society
