= National Register of Historic Places listings in Montgomery County, Iowa =

National Places in Montgomery

Location of Montgomery County in Iowa

This is a list of the National Register of Historic Places listings in Montgomery County, Iowa.

This is intended to be a complete list of the properties and districts on the National Register of Historic Places in Montgomery County, Iowa, United States. Latitude and longitude coordinates are provided for many National Register properties and districts; these locations may be seen together in a map.

There are 19 properties and districts listed on the National Register in the county, and one former listing.

This National Park Service list is complete through NPS recent listings posted April 3, 2026.

== Current listings ==
	Name on the Register	Image	Date listed	Location	City or town	Description
1	Chautauqua Park	Chautauqua Park	May 19, 1972 (#72000479)	Oak St. 41°01′00″N 95°13′17″W	Red Oak	
2	Chicago, Burlington Northern and Quincy Depot	Chicago, Burlington Northern and Quincy Depot	April 29, 1999 (#99000489)	305 S. 2nd St. 41°00′08″N 95°13′51″W	Red Oak	
3	William and Amanda J. Ellis Farmstead Historic District		October 23, 2015 (#15000752)	1134 I Ave. 41°08′26″N 95°12′50″W	Elliott vicinity	
4	Grant Commercial Historic District	Grant Commercial Historic District	September 12, 2002 (#02001031)	Parts of 2nd St. and U Ave. 41°08′31″N 94°59′03″W	Grant	
5	Alfred Hebard House	Alfred Hebard House	April 12, 1984 (#84001290)	700 8th St. 41°00′39″N 95°13′22″W	Red Oak	
6	Montgomery County Courthouse	Montgomery County Courthouse	July 2, 1981 (#81000259)	Coolbaugh and 2nd Sts. 41°00′34″N 95°13′50″W	Red Oak	
7	Montgomery County Jail		December 18, 1992 (#92001661)	100 W. Coolbaugh St. 41°00′31″N 95°13′55″W	Red Oak	
8	Josiah B. and Sara Moore House	Josiah B. and Sara Moore House	December 1, 1997 (#97001471)	508 E. 2nd St. 40°55′50″N 94°58′23″W	Villisca	
9	Thos. D. Murphy Co. Factory and Power Plant	Thos. D. Murphy Co. Factory and Power Plant	May 19, 2008 (#08000505)	110 S. 2nd St. 41°00′17″N 95°13′49″W	Red Oak	
10	Nodaway River Bridge	Nodaway River Bridge	May 15, 1998 (#98000494)	Pedestrian path in Pilot Grove County Park; 41°08′52″N 95°02′31″W	Grant	
11	Edmund B. Osborne House	Edmund B. Osborne House	October 30, 1997 (#97001287)	1020 Boundary St. 41°00′48″N 95°13′13″W	Red Oak	
12	Red Oak Downtown Historic District	Red Oak Downtown Historic District	December 20, 2016 (#16000868)	Roughly bound by E. Hammond, N.5th, N. 1 Sts., E. Washington Ave. 41°00′32″N 95°13′45″W	Red Oak	
13	Red Oak Firehouse and City Jail	Red Oak Firehouse and City Jail	January 11, 2006 (#05001508)	318 E. Washington Ave. 41°00′28″N 95°13′42″W	Red Oak	
14	Red Oak High School		June 22, 2020 (#100005294)	308 East Corning St. 41°00′40″N 95°13′43″W	Red Oak	
15	Red Oak Public Library	Red Oak Public Library	May 23, 1983 (#83000394)	2nd and Washington Sts. 41°05′31″N 95°14′50″W	Red Oak	
16	Round Barn, Pilot Grove Township		June 30, 1986 (#86001467)	County Road H20; 41°06′21″N 95°04′50″W	Pilot Grove Township	
17	Round Barn, Washington Township		June 30, 1986 (#86001466)	U.S. Route 71; 41°03′39″N 94°59′01″W	Washington Township	
18	Sciola Missionary Baptist Church	Sciola Missionary Baptist Church	July 18, 1983 (#83000395)	U.S. Route 71; 41°02′03″N 94°59′09″W	Sciola	
19	Villisca National Guard Armory	Villisca National Guard Armory	May 18, 2015 (#15000227)	316 E. 3rd St. 40°55′47″N 94°58′35″W	Villisca	

=== Former listings ===
	Name on the Register	Image	Date listed	Date removed	Location	City or town	Description
1	B. F. Runnels House		June 4, 1979 (#79000918)	March 15, 2000	Southwest of Red Oak	Red Oak vicinity	

== See also ==
- List of National Historic Landmarks in Iowa
- National Register of Historic Places listings in Iowa
- Listings in neighboring counties: Adams, Cass, Mills, Page, Pottawattamie
