= Hebard =

Hebard is a surname. Notable people with the surname include:

- Arthur F. Hebard (born 1940), Professor of Physics at University of Florida
- Caroline Hebard (1944–2007), dog trainer
- Emory A. Hebard (1917–1993), Vermont businessman and politician
- Grace Raymond Hebard (1861–1936), Wyoming historian, suffragist, pioneering scholar and prolific writer
- Morgan Hebard (1887-1946), entomologist
- Ruthy Hebard (born 1998), American basketball player
- William Hebard (1800–1875), United States Representative from Vermont

== Places ==
- Hebards, Michigan (also spelled Hebard), an unincorporated community

== See also ==
- Ben Hebard Fuller (1870–1937), major general in the United States Marine Corps
- George Hebard Williamson (1872–1936), American architect
- Alfred Hebard House, a historic residence located in Red Oak, Iowa, United States
- Hebard – Ford Summer House, a private house located north of L'Anse in Pequaming, Michigan
