= Red Oak Street Railway =

Defunct horsecar line in Iowa

The Red Oak Street Railway was a horsecar line in Red Oak, Iowa. It operated from 1882 to 1902, providing a connection to the city's Chicago, Burlington and Quincy Railroad depot.

On November 30, 1881, the Red Oak Street Railway was incorporated with the following as incorporators: P. P. Johnson, W. C. Lockhart, A. C. Hinchman, H. C. Houghton, John Hayes, Geo. M. West, H. H. Palmer, O. E. Whitaker, F. M. Byrkit, J. F. Fisher, C. F Clarke, R. Wadsworth, M. Wadsworth. These public spirited citizens scarcely expected their investment to prove a bonanza, their idea being that a street railway would tend to build up the town. P. P. Johnson, who was one of the moving spirits in the affair, was made president of the company, and O. E. Whitaker, the first superintendent. The system was opened for business April 1, 1882, the company having expended between $5,000 and $10,000 in track and equipment. (Note: equivalent to between $166,810 and $333,621 in 2025 adjusted for inflation) Two cars were used, and they were propelled by horse or mule power. With a ride costing 5¢, (Note: equivalent to $16.68 in 2025 adjusted for inflation) the receipts for the first month amounted to $147. (Note: equivalent to $4,904 in 2025 adjusted for inflation) It does not appear that the company ever paid dividends, although they started in by running their cars on regular schedule, from Sixth and Prospect Streets to the passenger depot, every fifteen minutes. Finally in February 1886, Marcus Bonham acquired control, and after that he operated the line in his personal interest for the next fifteen years. For the greater part of this time he made no attempt to run on schedule, except that he regularly made the trains. Not only did he carry passengers on his street car, but baggage as well. The mule car system became more or less of a standing joke among traveling men throughout the Western country. Mr. Bonham finally became interested in mining in Colorado, and about April 1901, disposed of the railway to S. P. Wallace of Griswold.

Wallace ran the line for a year or more until the city got ready to pave the square, when they tore up the tracks, and Red Oak's street railway system passed out of existence. This action on the part of the city was due to the fact that Mr. Wallace either did not have the funds to pay for the paving between the tracks, or showed no disposition to make the improvement. That August as paving was commenced on Reed Street, Wallace appeared with a lot of stringers and commenced laying new tracks. He was stopped and immediately phoned his wife to come to his assistance and come armed. She arrived with a gun which finally resulted in Wallace landing in jail and was afterwards bailed out by his wife. A number of damage and injunction suits against the city followed, winding up with a suit for heavy damages against the mayor and members of the council. None of the suits ever amounted to anything, and no damages were secured.
