= Red Oak Public Library =

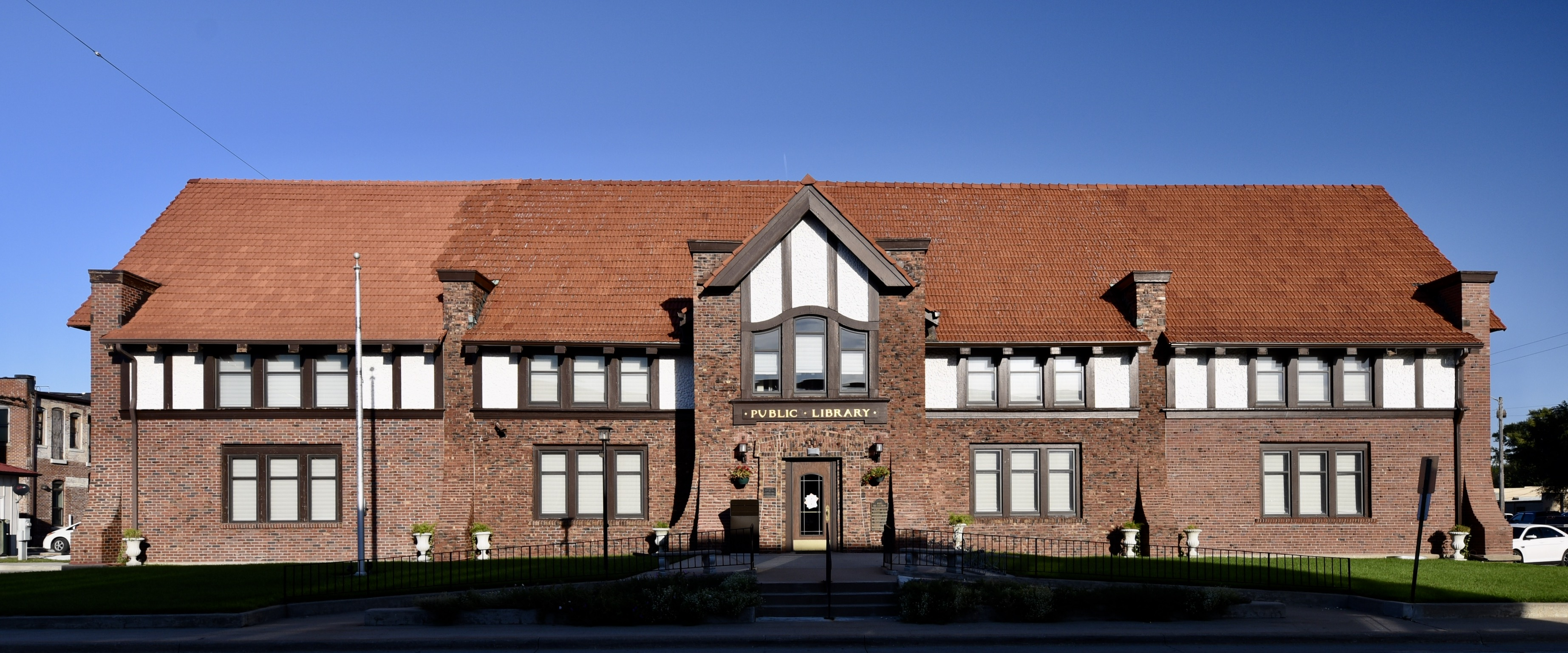
- Location: 400 N. 2nd St. Red Oak, Iowa, United States
- Type: Public
- Architect: Patton & Miller

Other information
- Director: Kathi Most
- Website: www.redoak.lib.ia.us
- Red Oak Public Library
- U.S. National Register of Historic Places
- U.S. Historic district – Contributing property
- Location within Iowa Location within the United States
- Coordinates: 41°00′29.8″N 95°13′48.3″W
- Area: less than one acre
- Built: 1909
- Architect: Patton & Miller
- Architectural style: Tudor Revival
- Part of: Red Oak Downtown Historic District (ID16000868)
- MPS: Public Library Buildings in Iowa TR
- NRHP reference No.: 83000394
- Added to NRHP: May 23, 1983

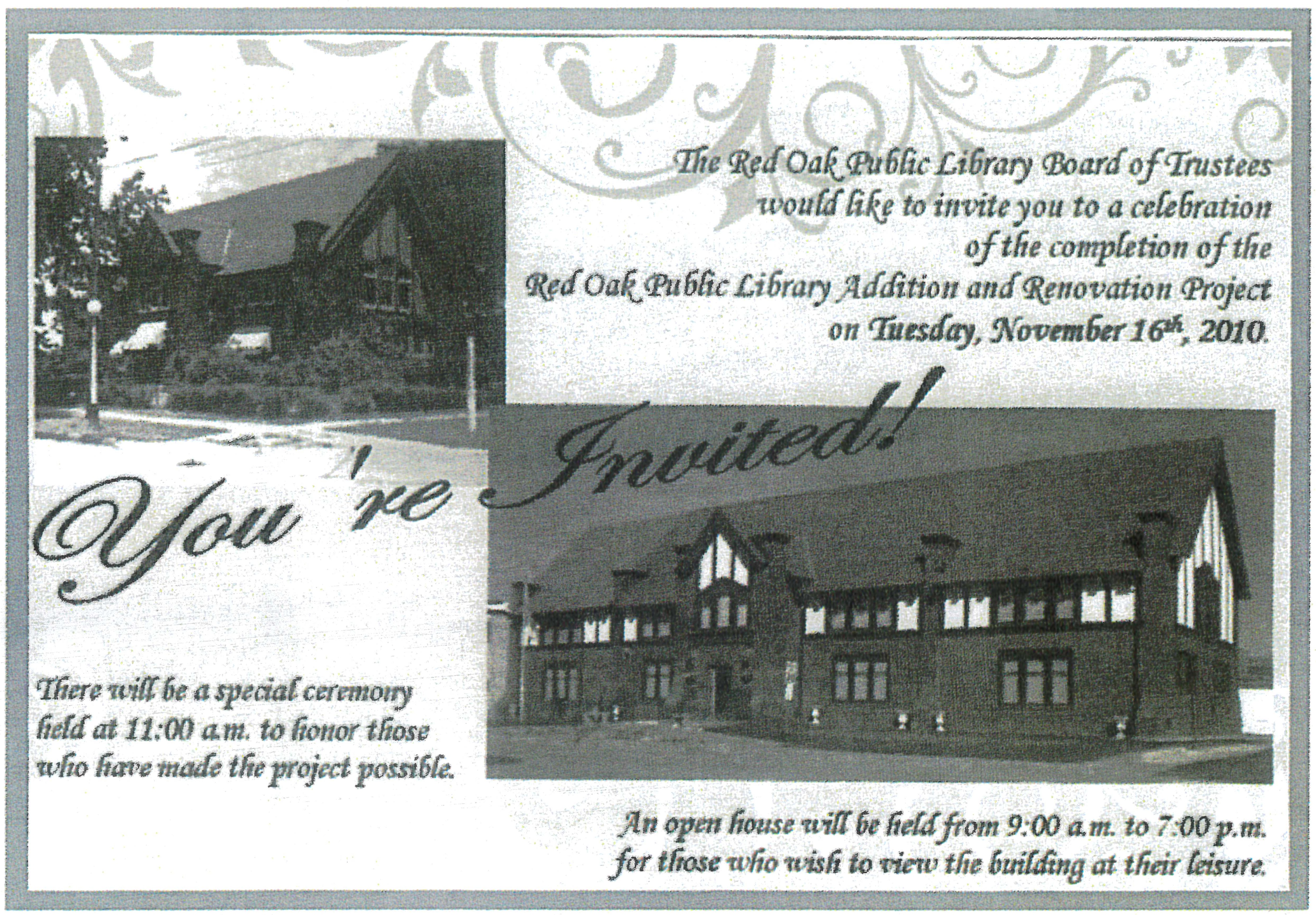
Open House Invitation for 16 November 2010 - Red Oak, Iowa, Public Library expansion.

The Red Oak Public Library is located in Red Oak, Iowa, United States. Andrew Carnegie accepted the city's application for a grant for $12,500 on November 27, 1906. The Chicago architectural firm of Patton & Miller designed the Tudor Revival structure. It was dedicated on October 8, 1909.

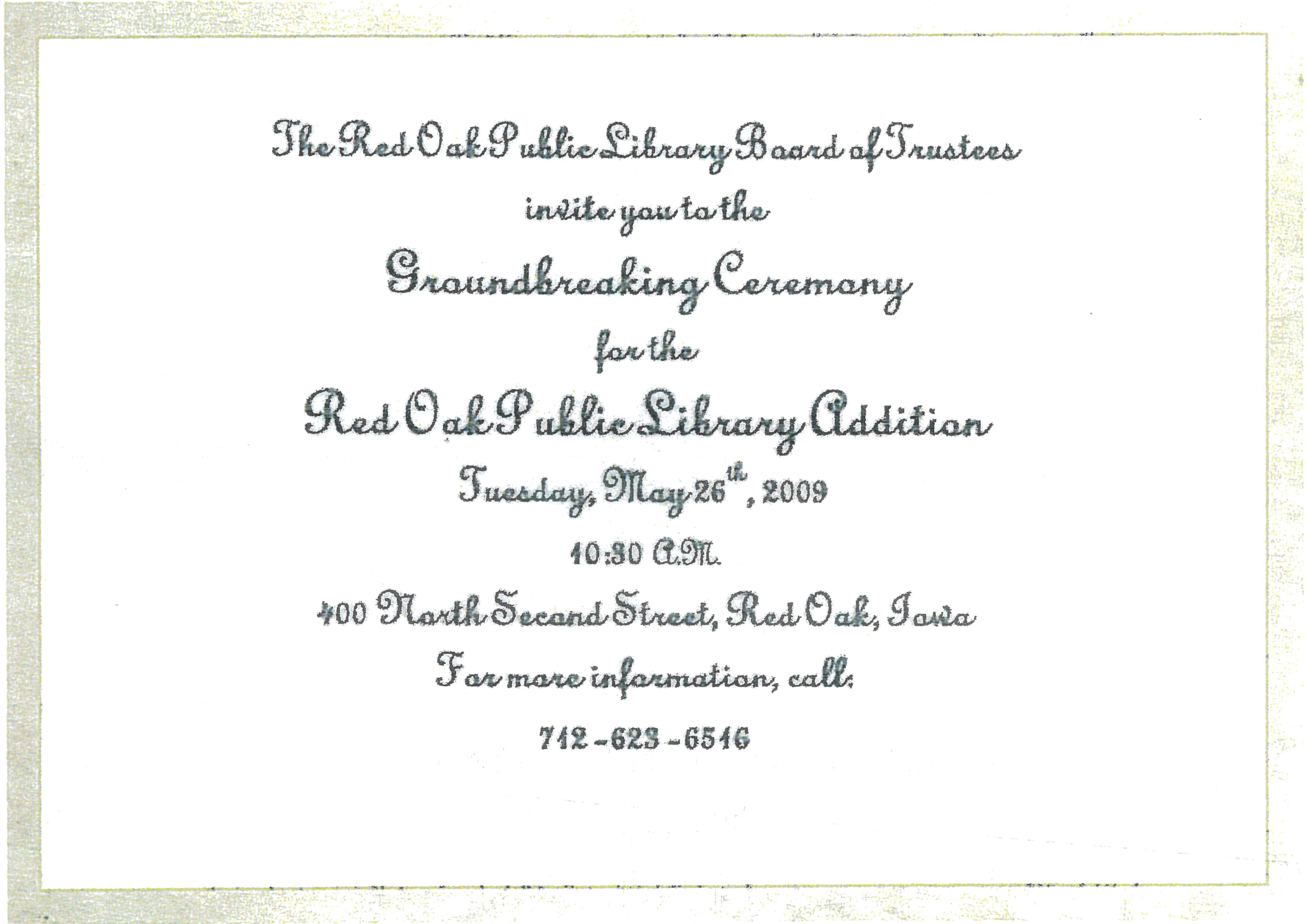
26 May 2009 Invitation to Groundbreaking Ceremony for library expansion.

The two-story building features a side-gable plan, and rustic brick-and-half-timbered style. It is somewhat unusual in that its main entrance was at grade. The corners are buttresses that rise from the base in a concave curve and disappear into the walls before they emerge above the eaves as parapets. A two-story addition was built onto the rear of the building in 1924 to house a new book stack, and another two-story addition was built on the south side to house reading rooms. A dedication on 2 October 2010 expanded the library to the north. All additions complement the structure's original design. The building was individually listed on the National Register of Historic Places in 1983. In 2016 it was included as a contributing property in the Red Oak Downtown Historic District.
