= Chautauqua Park (Red Oak, Iowa) =

- U.S. National Register of Historic Places
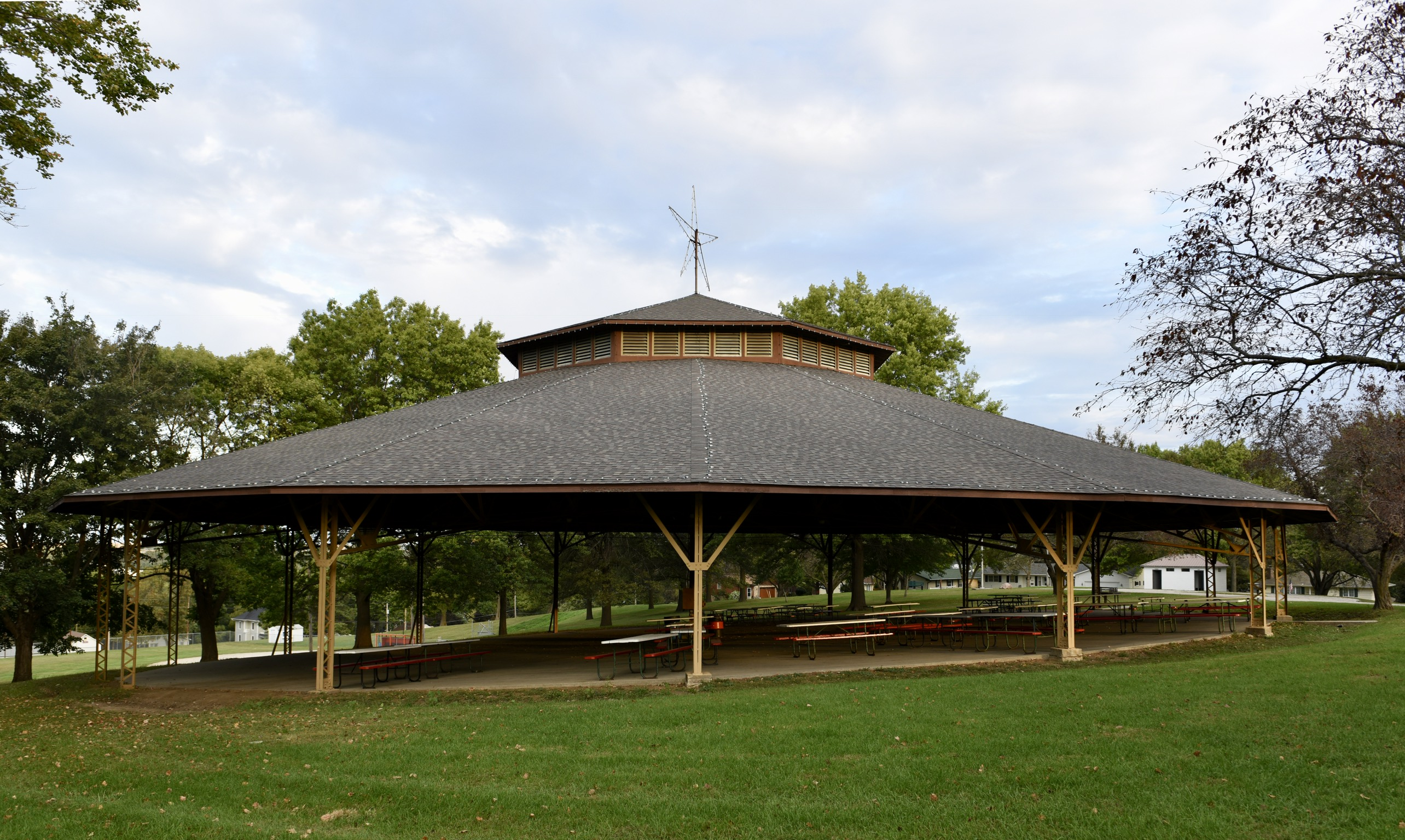

- Location within Iowa Location within the United States
- Location: Summit St. Red Oak, Iowa
- Coordinates: 41°0′59″N 95°13′16″W
- Built: 1908
- NRHP reference No.: 72000479
- Added to NRHP: May 19, 1972

Chautauqua Park is a historic pavilion located in Red Oak, Iowa, United States. The first Chautauqua in Iowa was established at Clear Lake, Iowa in 1876, and by the 1920s there were as many as 500 Chautauqua assemblies in the state. Most of the structures used for the organization's functions in Iowa were tents, but Red Oak became the exception when this pavilion was built in 1908. The circular structure was built for about $5,200, and it had a seating capacity of between 3,500 and 5,000. Speakers on the inaugural program included orator and politician William Jennings Bryan, social reformer Jane Addams, Wisconsin Governor Robert M. La Follette, and evangelist Gipsy Smith. It continued to host annual Chautauqua programs until 1929. Chautauqua Park was listed on the National Register of Historic Places in 1972.
