= Red Oak Downtown Historic District =

Historic district in Iowa, United States

- U.S. National Register of Historic Places
- U.S. Historic district
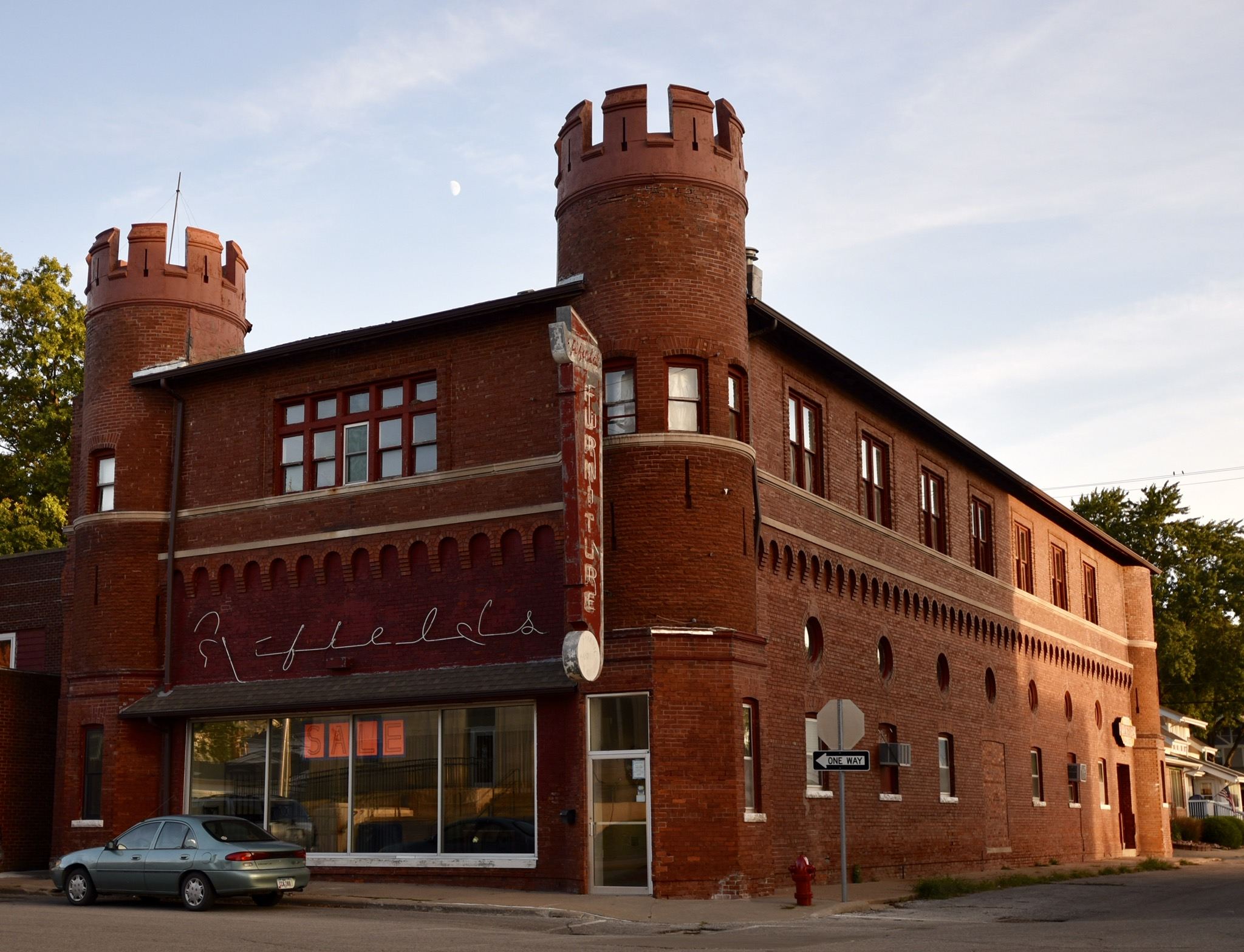
- Armory (1899/1908)

- Location within Iowa Location within the United States
- Location: Roughly bound by E. Hammond, N.5th, N. 1 Sts., E. Washington Ave., Red Oak, Iowa
- Coordinates: 41°0′33.6″N 95°13′42.8″W
- Architectural style: Late Victorian; Late 19th & early 20th century Revivals; Modern Movement
- MPS: Iowa's Main Street Commercial Architecture MPS
- NRHP reference No.: 16000868
- Added to NRHP: December 20, 2016

The Red Oak Downtown Historic District is a nationally recognized historic district located in Red Oak, Iowa, United States. It was listed on the National Register of Historic Places in 2016. At the time of its nomination it contained 104 resources, which included 73 contributing buildings, eight contributing objects, one contributing site, 15 non-contributing buildings, six non-contributing objects, and one non-contributing structure. The historic district covers most of the city's central business district. It is a flat area of land in an otherwise hilly region. The district is centered on Fountain Square, a public green space around which the town had been platted in 1857. A second public square was added in 1890 for the Montgomery County Courthouse after Red Oak won a special election to move the county seat from Frankfort.

The district contains a mix of attached commercial buildings and free-standing government, commercial and light industrial buildings. The courthouse (1891), Red Oak Firehouse and City Jail (1898/1901), and the Red Oak Public Library (1909) are all individually listed on the National Register of Historic Places. Most of the buildings are two-part commercial blocks that reflect the styles and materials that were popular when they were built. The single-story buildings are generally one-part commercial blocks or roadside commercial buildings. Fountain Square is the contributing site and all of the contributing and non-contributing objects are located there, generally as war memorials or park elements.
