= William and Amanda J. Ellis Farmstead Historic District =

Historic district in Iowa, United States

- U.S. National Register of Historic Places
- U.S. Historic district
- Location within Iowa Location within the United States
- Location: 1134 I Ave. Elliott, Iowa
- Coordinates: 41°08′26″N 95°12′50″W
- Area: 1.1 acres (0.45 ha)
- Built: c. 1900
- Architectural style: Queen Anne
- NRHP reference No.: 15000752
- Added to NRHP: October 23, 2015

The William and Amanda J. Ellis Farmstead Historic District is a nationally recognized historic district located near Elliott, Iowa, United States. It was listed on the National Register of Historic Places in 2015. At the time of its nomination it contained four resources, which included two contributing buildings, and two non-contributing buildings. William and Amanda Jane Ellis owned this farm from 1882 to 1919. During that time the Queen Anne style house with Stick influences and the heavy timber frame barn were built. Both were constructed around 1900. Two garages are the non-contributing buildings.

The two-story, frame house is a T-plan structure with five gables. Four of the gables are decorated with knob-like beads and rosettes. The barn is three bays wide with a broken gable type roof with shed-gables. The central section is taller than its flanking sheds. The style was popular from 1900 into the 1920s.
