= Janet Thompson (basketball) =

American basketball player

Janet Thompson Milner (11 July 1933, in Elliott, Iowa, United States – 9 July 2014) was an American women's basketball player, who played on the first United States women's national basketball team. Thompson played college basketball at Iowa Wesleyan University and earned a gold medal as part of the 1953 team that won the first FIBA World Championship for Women.
