= Red Oak Firehouse and City Jail =

- U.S. National Register of Historic Places
- U.S. Historic district – Contributing property
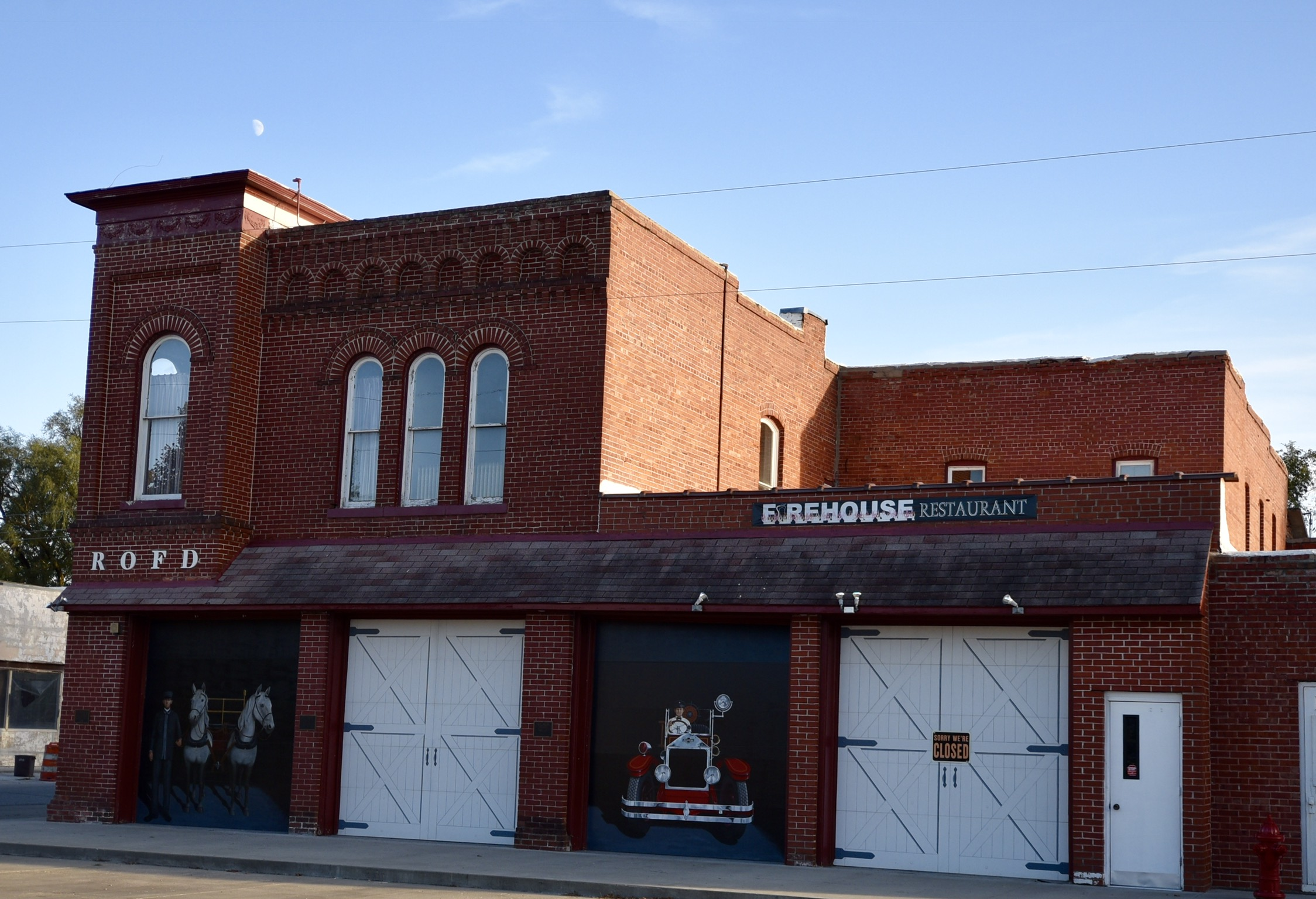

- Location within Iowa Location within the United States
- Location: 318 E. Washington Ave. Red Oak, Iowa
- Coordinates: 41°0′28″N 95°13′41″W
- Area: less than one acre
- Built: 1898 (Firehouse); 1901 (Jail)
- Architects: O.H. Christopher; Charles Pratt
- Architectural style: Late Victorian
- Part of: Red Oak Downtown Historic District (ID16000868)
- NRHP reference No.: 05001508
- Added to NRHP: January 11, 2006

The Red Oak Firehouse and City Jail is a historic building located in Red Oak, Iowa, United States. The Red Oak Fire Company was formed in 1876 and a shed was built to house its equipment. The present Late Victorian style brick structure was built by the city in five stages. A two-story firehouse, which housed the hand-drawn fire carts and other firefighting equipment, was completed in January 1898. The two-story City Jail was architecturally integrated into the original structure in 1901. It was operated by the city marshal to house those who broke municipal ordinances, and to provide a bed and a meal to those who were homeless. Another two-story addition was completed in 1907. It was a stable to house the horses that pulled the new firefighting equipment, which was housed in another addition that was built at the same time on the south side of the structure.

The second floor was used to house firefighters. Prior to 1907 the station was staffed by volunteers. A single-story city tool house for storage of city maintenance equipment was completed in 1924. The second floor was altered in 1927 to provide apartments for three firefighters and their families. The final addition was completed in 1948 on the north side. The single-story structure provided two additional bays for fire trucks and integrated the tool house, jail, and firehouse into a single building. The city maintained the jail here until 1967 when all prisoners were housed in the county jail. The fire department remained in this facility until 1980 when a new building was completed.

The building was restored by Bill Hillman owner of The Depot Restaurant in nearby Shenandoah and run as a Brew Pub and restaurant, The Firehouse Brewery, until sold in 2006. Hillman had the building individually listed on the National Register of Historic Places in 2006. It was named one of the best historical preservations in the state in 2015. In 2016 it was included as a contributing property in the Red Oak Downtown Historic District.
