= Caroline Hebard =

Caroline Hebard (1944–2007) was a trainer of search and rescue dogs.

Hebard was born in Santiago, Chile, on 20 June 1944. Her father was a British career diplomat who relocated frequently due to his government assignments. She grew up on four continents and acquired proficiency in several languages during her youth.

An animal lover, Hebard became involved in the training of rescue dogs and was a co-founder of the United States Disaster Response Team. The team participated in earthquake rescue missions in Mexico, Armenia, Japan and Turkey, where the dogs were used to locate trapped survivors. She and her dogs also took part in rescue and recovery operations involving bridge collapses, floods, fires, and individuals lost in the wilderness. Additionally, they contributed to search and rescue operations following the Oklahoma City bombing and the September 11 World Trade Center attack.

Hebard received numerous honors for her work and is the subject of a book, So That Others May Live: Caroline Hebard and Her Search-and-Rescue Dogs, which she co-wrote.

She was married to physicist Arthur F. Hebard and together they had four children. She died on 22 October 2007 after battling cancer.
