= Alfred Hebard House =

Historic house in Iowa, United States

- U.S. National Register of Historic Places
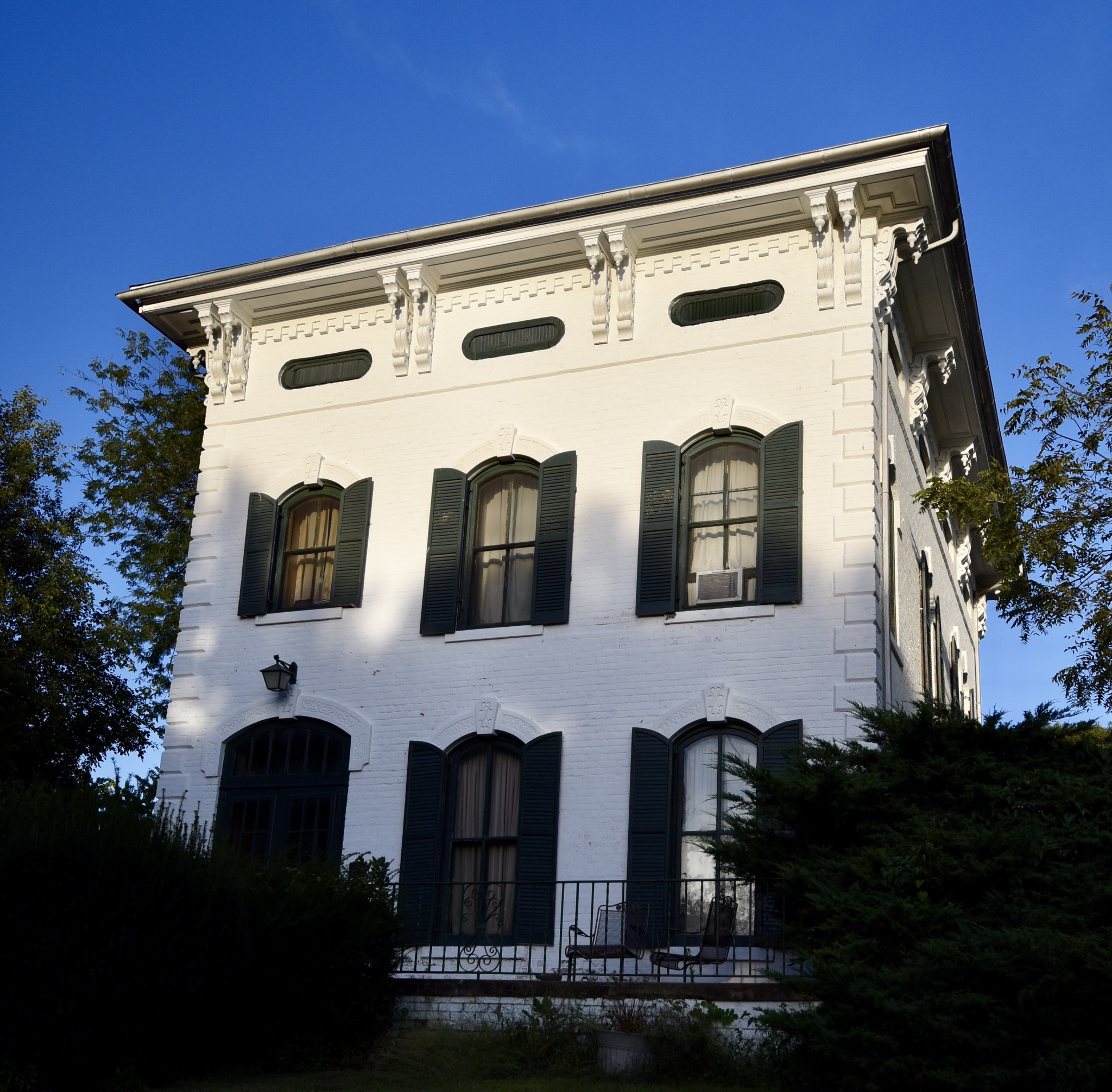

- Location within Iowa Location within the United States
- Location: 700 8th St. Red Oak, Iowa
- Coordinates: 41°0′38″N 95°13′22″W
- Area: less than one acre
- Built: 1874
- Built by: David S. Haas
- Architectural style: Italianate
- NRHP reference No.: 84001290
- Added to NRHP: April 12, 1984

The Alfred Hebard House is a historic residence located in Red Oak, Iowa, United States. Hebard settled in Iowa five years after he graduated from Yale in 1832. He farmed outside of Burlington during which time he served in the territorial legislature. In 1853 he did a preliminary survey across southern Iowa for the Burlington and Missouri River Railroad. He and others surveyed and platted the town of Red Oak Junction in 1857, and settled there in 1868 when the railroad was built through the region. Hebard served in the Iowa Senate from 1875 to 1879. He had David S. Haas build this house for him in the summer and autumn of 1874. Hebard and his wife Anna lived in the house until his death in 1886. The house remained in the family until 1925. It was used as the parsonage for the First Congregational Church from then until 1932.

The two-story brick structure is a textbook example of the Italianate style. The house features rusticated stone quoins, paired elongated bracketed eaves, stilted segmented arched windows, and a square-cut bay on the south side. It originally had a full-width front porch, which has subsequently been removed. The house was listed on the National Register of Historic Places in 1984.
