= Sciola, Iowa =

- Unincorporated community
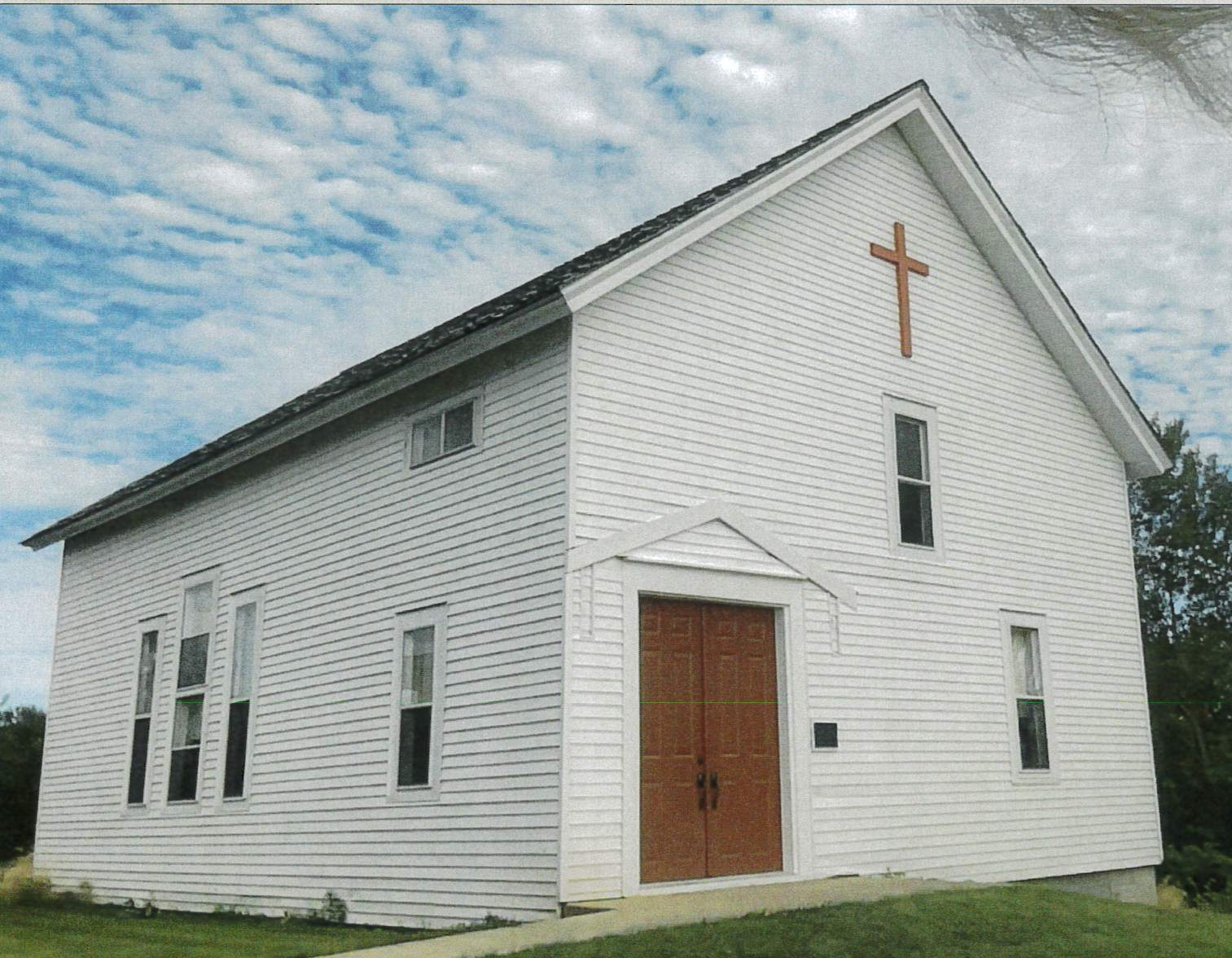
- Sciola Missionary Baptist Church

- Location within Iowa Location within the United States
- Coordinates: 41°02′02″N 94°59′08″W
- Country: United States
- State: Iowa
- County: Montgomery
- Elevation: 1,099 ft (335 m)
- Time zone: UTC-6 (Central (CST))
  - Summer (DST): UTC-5 (CDT)
- Area code: 712
- GNIS feature ID: 464735

Sciola is an unincorporated community in Montgomery County, Iowa, United States. Sciola is located on U.S. Route 71, 7.2 miles (11.6 km) north of Villisca.

== History ==
Sciola's population was 27 in 1902.
