= Arthur F. Hebard =

Professor of Physics at University of Florida

- Born: March 2, 1940 (age 86); New York City, New York, U.S.
- Education: Stanford University
- Scientific career
- Fields: Physics
- Workplaces: University of Florida

Arthur Foster Hebard (born 2 March 1940) is Distinguished Professor of Physics at University of Florida in Gainesville, Florida. He is particularly noted for leading the discovery of superconductivity in Buckminsterfullerene in 1991.

Art Hebard attended The Hotchkiss School and graduated with a BA in physics from Yale University in 1962. He obtained his PhD from Stanford University in 1971 under William M. Fairbank with thesis Search for fractional charge using low temperature techniques. After a spell as a research associate at Stanford, he became a member of the technical staff at AT&T Bell Telephone Laboratories. He moved to the University of Florida as a professor in 1996, and in 2007 was given the title of distinguished professor.

He is the author of more than 250 refereed scientific publications and 90 invited presentations and has been issued 10 patents. He was awarded the 2008 James C. McGroddy Prize for New Materials by the American Physical Society, and a co-recipient of the 2015 Oliver E. Buckley Condensed Matter Prize , also given by the American Physical Society, "For discovery and pioneering investigations of the superconductor-insulator transition, a paradigm for quantum phase transitions."

His research interests include thin-film physics, graphene, fullerenes, and fullerene derived compounds, superconductivity, dilute magnetic semiconductors, magnetism in thin films and at thin film interfaces, interface capacitance, magnetocapacitance of complex oxides and semiconductors. Notable recent work has been on the use of graphene for solar cells. He has given a number of Ph.D. degrees to over 20 students. He is also the mentor of multiple award winner material scientist Sefaattin Tongay.

In 2017, Art Hebard was elected to the National Academy of Sciences.

He was married to the late Caroline Hebard and has four children and six grandchildren.
