= Red Oak station =

Historic train depot in Red Oak, Iowa, US

Red Oak
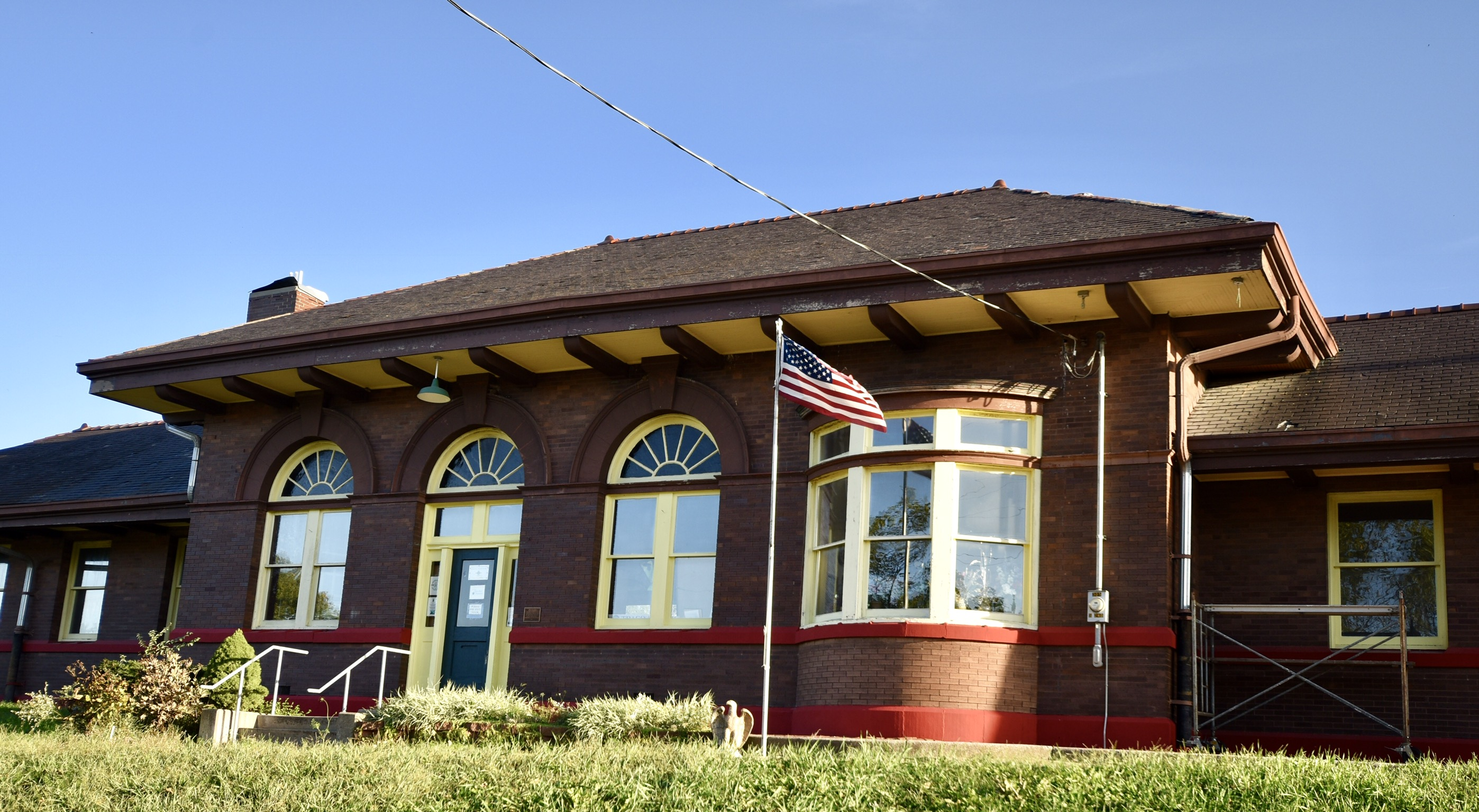
- Red Oak station in September 2017.

General information
- Location: 305 South Second Street, Red Oak, Iowa 51566
- System: Former Burlington Route passenger station

History
- Opened: 1903
- Closed: 1971
- Rebuilt: 2003

Services
Preceding station	Burlington Route	Following station
Emerson toward Denver	Main Line	Stanton toward Chicago
- Chicago, Burlington Northern and Quincy Depot
- U.S. National Register of Historic Places
- Location within Iowa Location within the United States
- Location: 305 S. Second St. Red Oak, Iowa
- Coordinates: 41°0′8″N 95°13′51″W
- Area: 1.3 acres (0.53 ha)
- Built: 1903
- Architectural style: Late Victorian
- NRHP reference No.: 99000489
- Added to NRHP: April 29, 1999
Location

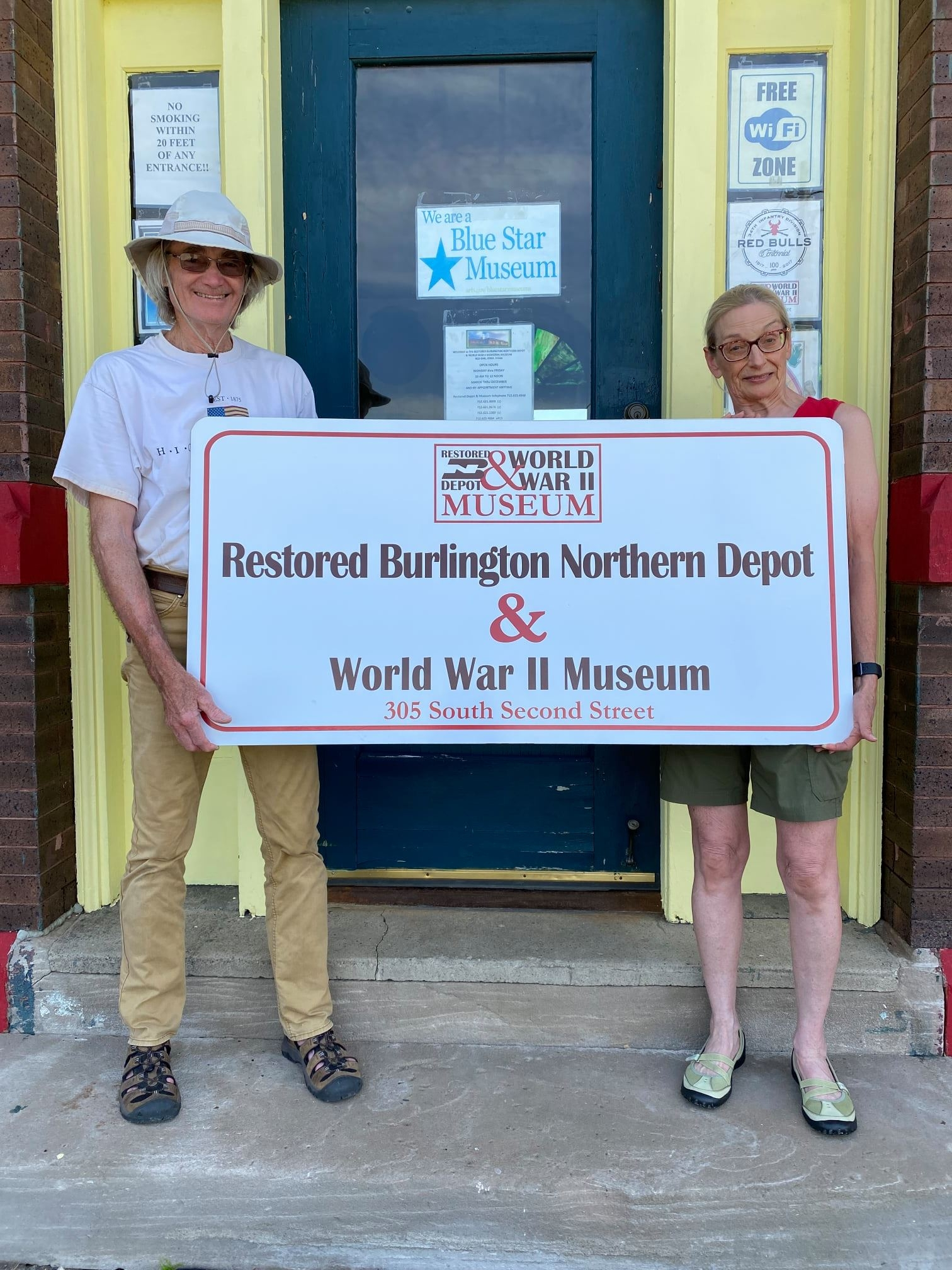
Volunteers and signage of The Restored Burlington Northern Depot & WWII Memorial Museum, Red Oak, Iowa

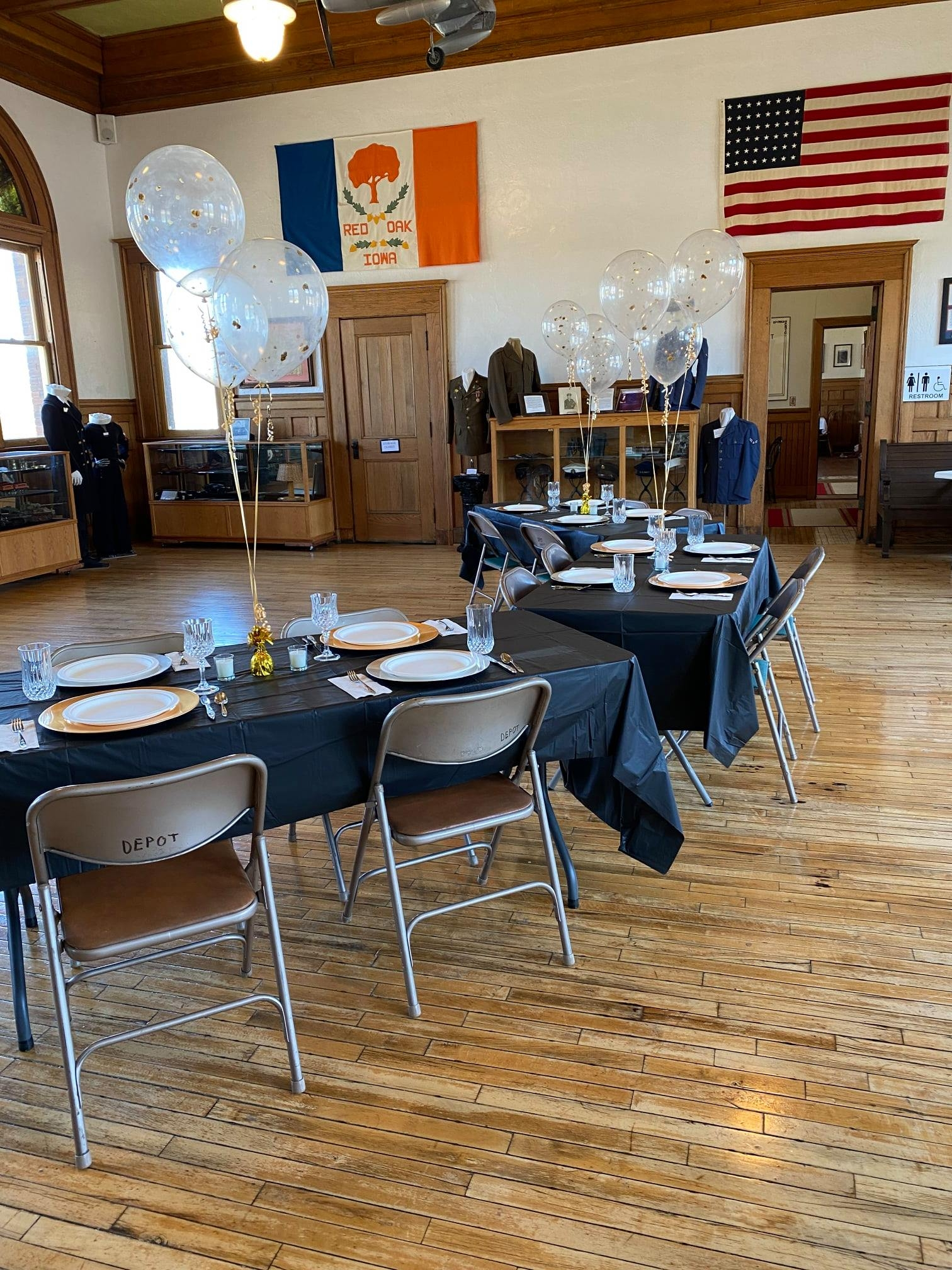
Interior view of The Restored Burlington Northern Depot & World War II Memorial Museum, Red Oak, Iowa

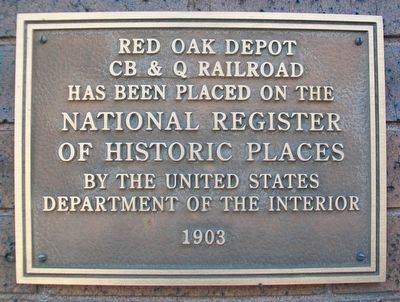
National Register of Historic Places plaque at The Restored Burlington Northern Depot & World War II Memorial Museum, Red Oak, Iowa. Register # 99000489

Red Oak station also known as the WWII Memorial Museum, is a historic train depot located in Red Oak, Iowa, United States. The town of Red Oak Junction was incorporated on 28 June 1869, by a vote of its citizens. The first passenger train service to Red Oak Junction was on 12 November 1869. That railroad was acquired by the Chicago, Burlington and Quincy Railroad, and they laid out a new right-of-way in southwest Iowa in the late 19th century to lessen the grade. It required a new depot in Red Oak, which was built from 1900 to 1903.

The single story, red brick structure, Late Victorian architectural style, is located on an embankment alongside the elevated tracks on the south side of town. It is .5-mile (0.80 km) south of where the previous depot was located. Passenger service ended in 1971, and the railroad sought to demolish the depot in 1993. It was donated to the community in 1995, and added to the National Register of Historic Places in 1999.

The restored Burlington Northern Depot is now home to the WWII Memorial Museum, with exhibits relating to people from Montgomery County, Iowa who served in World War II, as well as country life on the home front on farms, factories, communities and household life. There are also displays and a library about area railroad history. The depot is adjacent to the BNSF Railway mainline between Chicago and Denver.

The museum is OPEN 10 am to 12 noon, Monday through Friday, March through December, and by appointment anytime for docent led and self-guided tours, and for community and social events.
