= Sciola Missionary Baptist Church =

- U.S. National Register of Historic Places
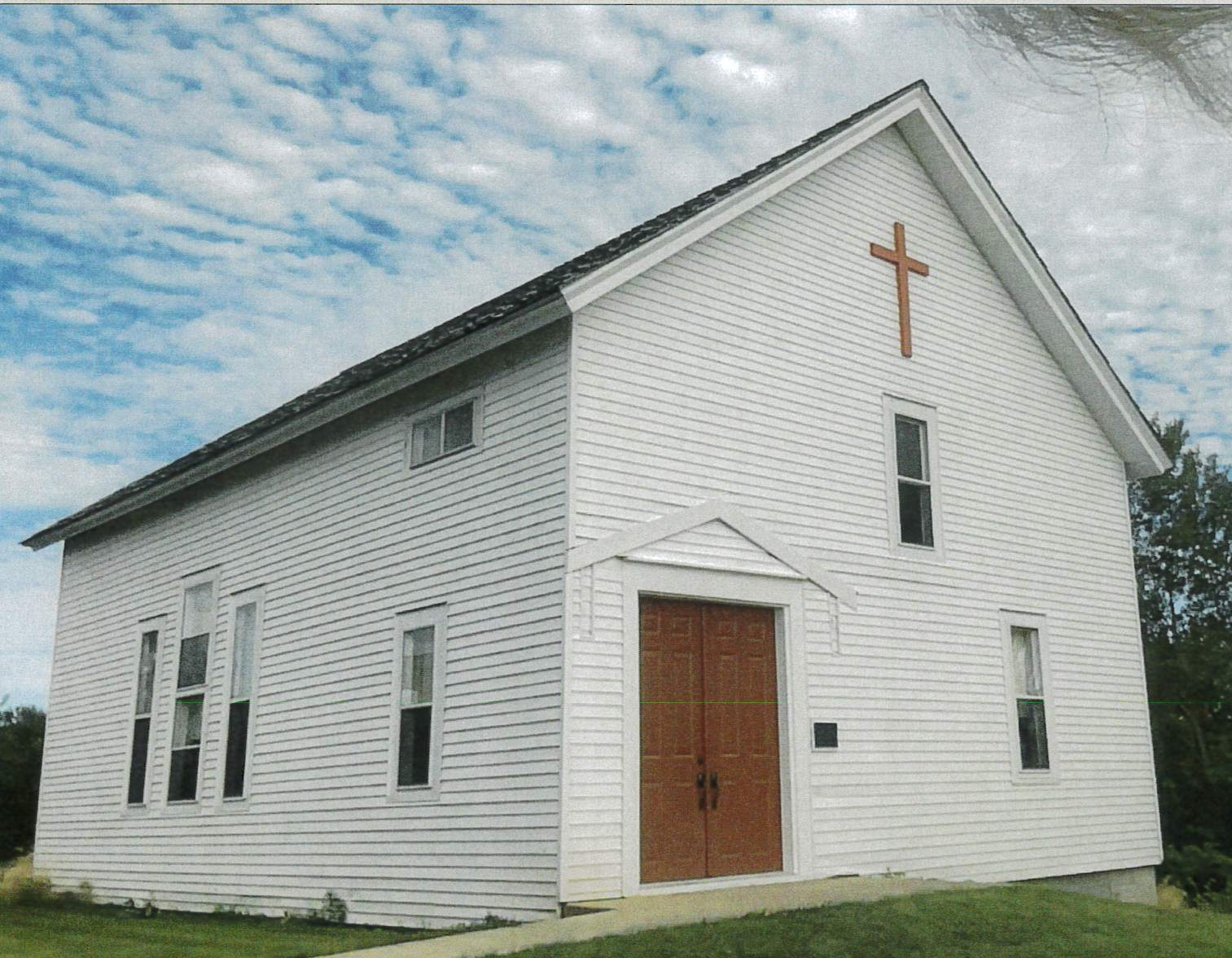

- Location within Iowa Location within the United States
- Location: US 71; Sciola, Iowa
- Coordinates: 41°2′3″N 94°59′9″W
- Area: less than one acre
- Built: 1871-1872
- NRHP reference No.: 83000395
- Added to NRHP: July 18, 1983

Sciola Missionary Baptist Church, also known as Sciola Community Church, is a historic church located in Sciola, Iowa, United States. It is the only building left from the former town, and a rare example of an early Iowa frame church building. The Sciola Post Office was established in 1855, and was the first one established in Montgomery County. The village was composed of a few stores, the church, and the post office.

The Baptist congregation was founded in January 1869 with nine families. They bought land from member John Yergey in June 1871, and they dedicated their small frame church on June 30, 1872. It cost them $1,600 to build it. They bought land from Yergey in 1882 for a cemetery. The Baptist congregation remained here until 1929. The church building was used for a variety of community functions until it was rededicated as the Sciola Community Church in 1946. It continued to be used for community functions and elections. The church was relocated in 1970, and the township took over ownership of the building in 1980. It was added to the National Register of Historic Places in 1983.
