= Montgomery County Courthouse (Iowa) =

- U.S. National Register of Historic Places
- U.S. Historic district – Contributing property
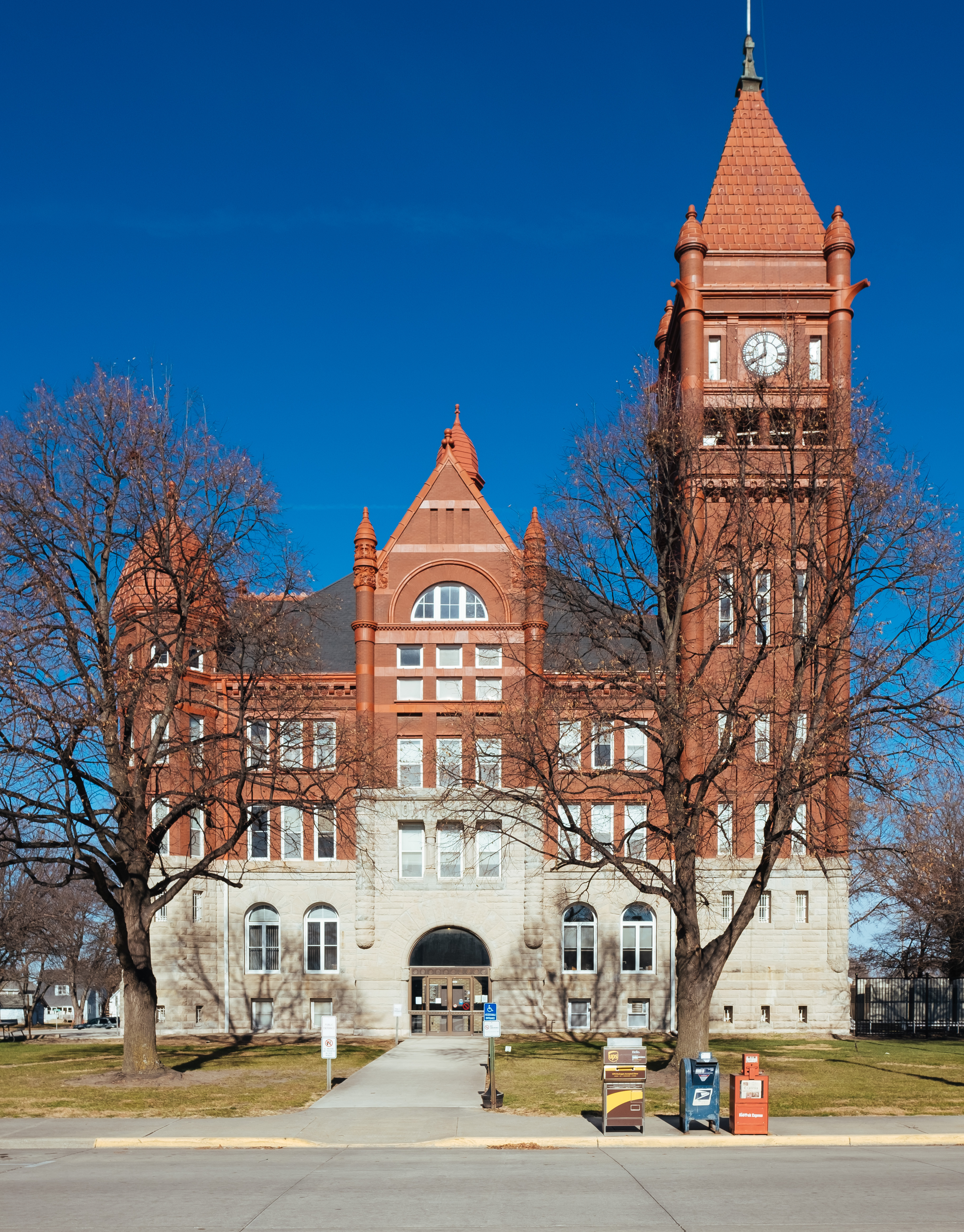

- Location within Iowa Location within the United States
- Interactive map showing the location of Montgomery County Courthouse
- Location: Coolbaugh and 2nd Sts. Red Oak, Iowa
- Coordinates: 41°0′34″N 95°13′50″W
- Area: less than one acre
- Built: 1891
- Built by: Richard & Co.
- Architect: H.C. Koch & Co.
- Architectural style: Romanesque
- Part of: Red Oak Downtown Historic District (ID16000868)
- MPS: County Courthouses in Iowa TR
- NRHP reference No.: 81000259
- Added to NRHP: July 2, 1981

The Montgomery County Courthouse is located in Red Oak, Iowa, United States. It was individually listed on the National Register of Historic Places in 1981. In 2016 it was included as a contributing property in the Red Oak Downtown Historic District. The courthouse is the third building the county has used for court functions and county administration.

== History ==
Montgomery County's first county seat was Frankfort and the courthouse there was a room in a log cabin. The dining room set of the cabin's occupants was used for the furniture and the jury deliberated outside. It was replaced by a two-story building that was built for $1,000. The building measured 36 by 18 feet (11.0 by 5.5 m). An election was held in 1863 that moved the county seat to Red Oak, but confusion of some sort ensued. The voters had to be canvassed so the decision could be confirmed, which was accomplished in June 1864. When the county seat was moved to Red Oak the courthouse was put on sleds and thirty yoke of oxen pulled it through a blizzard. Because of the storm's intensity, the team was moved off course and the oxen were unhitched, allowing the courthouse to "wander" on its own. It was located on a homestead northeast of Red Oak and guided to its new site on one of the town squares.

Several efforts to replace the old courthouse failed. After the decision to replace it passed, an Omaha contractor failed to satisfy the contract and left the building uncompleted with numerous unpaid bills. The courts ruled that the county was not liable for the contractor's debts, and the county acquired much of the construction materials without charge. The cornerstone for the present courthouse was laid on July 4, 1890, and construction was completed a year later and dedicated on March 2, 1892. The Romanesque Revival style building was built at a cost of $100,000. The Milwaukee architectural firm H.C. Koch & Company designed the building, and it was built by Richard & Company.

== Architecture ==
The 3½-story structure was built on a raised basement. The lower levels are composed on rusticated limestone, while the upper levels are brick. The exterior of the building features an abundance of towers, turrets, finials, cresting, and a large polygonal bay. A cupola is located on the peak of the hip roof. The tall clock tower with its steeply peaked roof adds to the vericality of the building. It is considered one of the best Victorian Romanesque courthouses in Iowa. The significance of the courthouse is derived from its association with county government, and the political power and prestige of Red Oak as the county seat.
