= Elliott, Iowa =

- City
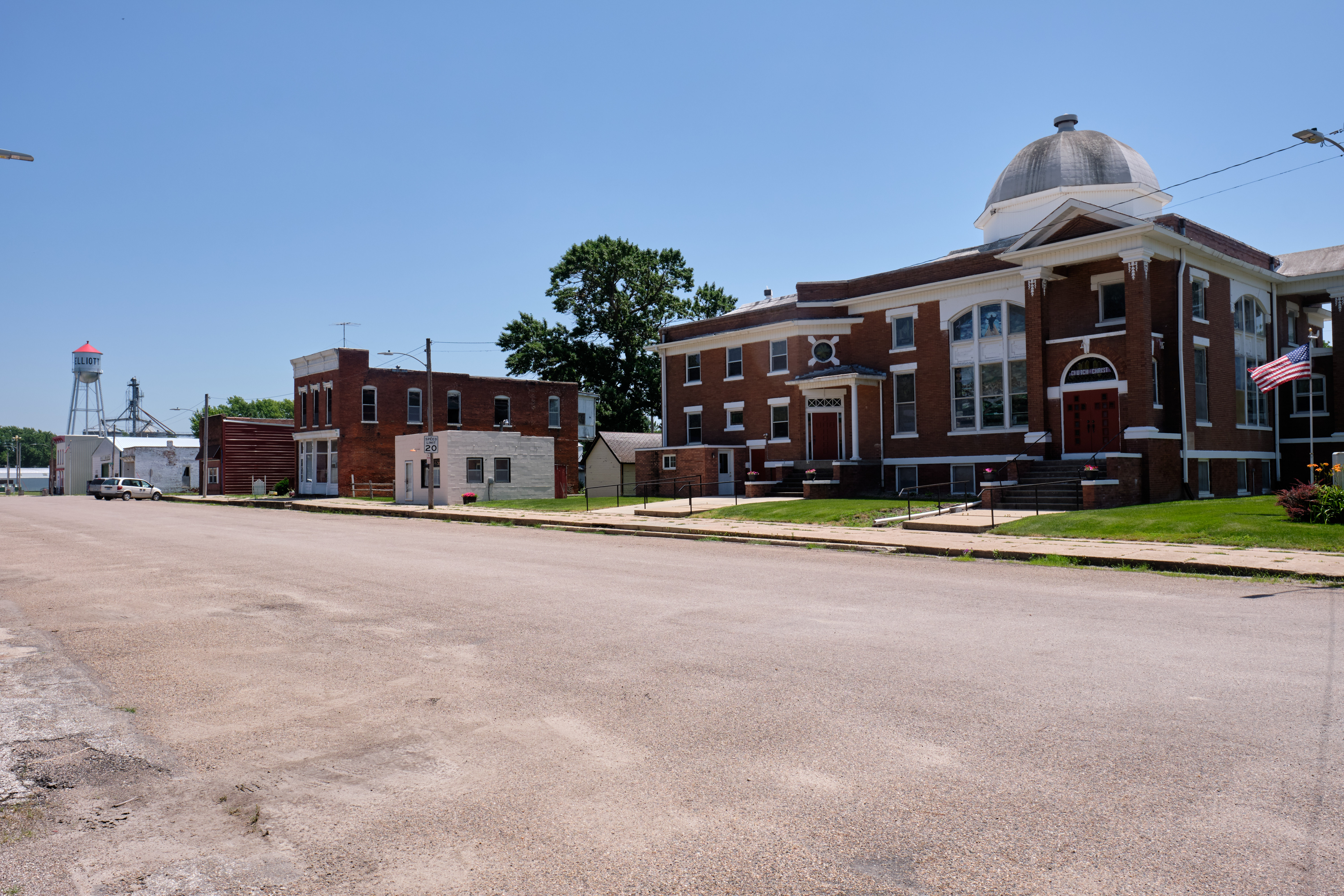
- Buildings in Elliott

- Location of Elliott, Iowa
- Coordinates: 41°08′58″N 95°09′47″W
- Country: United States
- State: Iowa
- County: Montgomery
- Township: Sherman
- Established: 1879
- Incorporated: March 14, 1882

Area
  - Total: 0.42 sq mi (1.10 km^{2})
  - Land: 0.42 sq mi (1.10 km^{2})
  - Water: 0 sq mi (0.00 km^{2})
- Elevation: 1,076 ft (328 m)

Population (2020)
  - Total: 338
  - Density: 797.8/sq mi (308.05/km^{2})
- Time zone: UTC-6 (Central (CST))
  - Summer (DST): UTC-5 (CDT)
- ZIP code: 51532
- Area code: 712
- FIPS code: 19-24915
- GNIS feature ID: 2394663

Elliott is a city in Sherman Township, Montgomery County, Iowa, United States, along the East Nishnabotna River. The population was 338 at the time of the 2020 census.

== History ==
Elliott was founded in 1879. On March 14, 1882, Elliott was officially incorporated as a city.

== Geography ==
According to the United States Census Bureau, the city has a total area of 0.42 square miles (1.09 km^{2}), all land.

== Demographics ==
Historical populations
Year	Pop.	±%
1880	177	—
1890	317	+79.1%
1900	516	+62.8%
1910	528	+2.3%
1920	586	+11.0%
1930	556	−5.1%
1940	548	−1.4%
1950	482	−12.0%
1960	459	−4.8%
1970	423	−7.8%
1980	493	+16.5%
1990	399	−19.1%
2000	402	+0.8%
2010	350	−12.9%
2020	338	−3.4%
Source:"U.S. Census website". United States Census Bureau. and Iowa Data Center; Source: U.S. Decennial Census

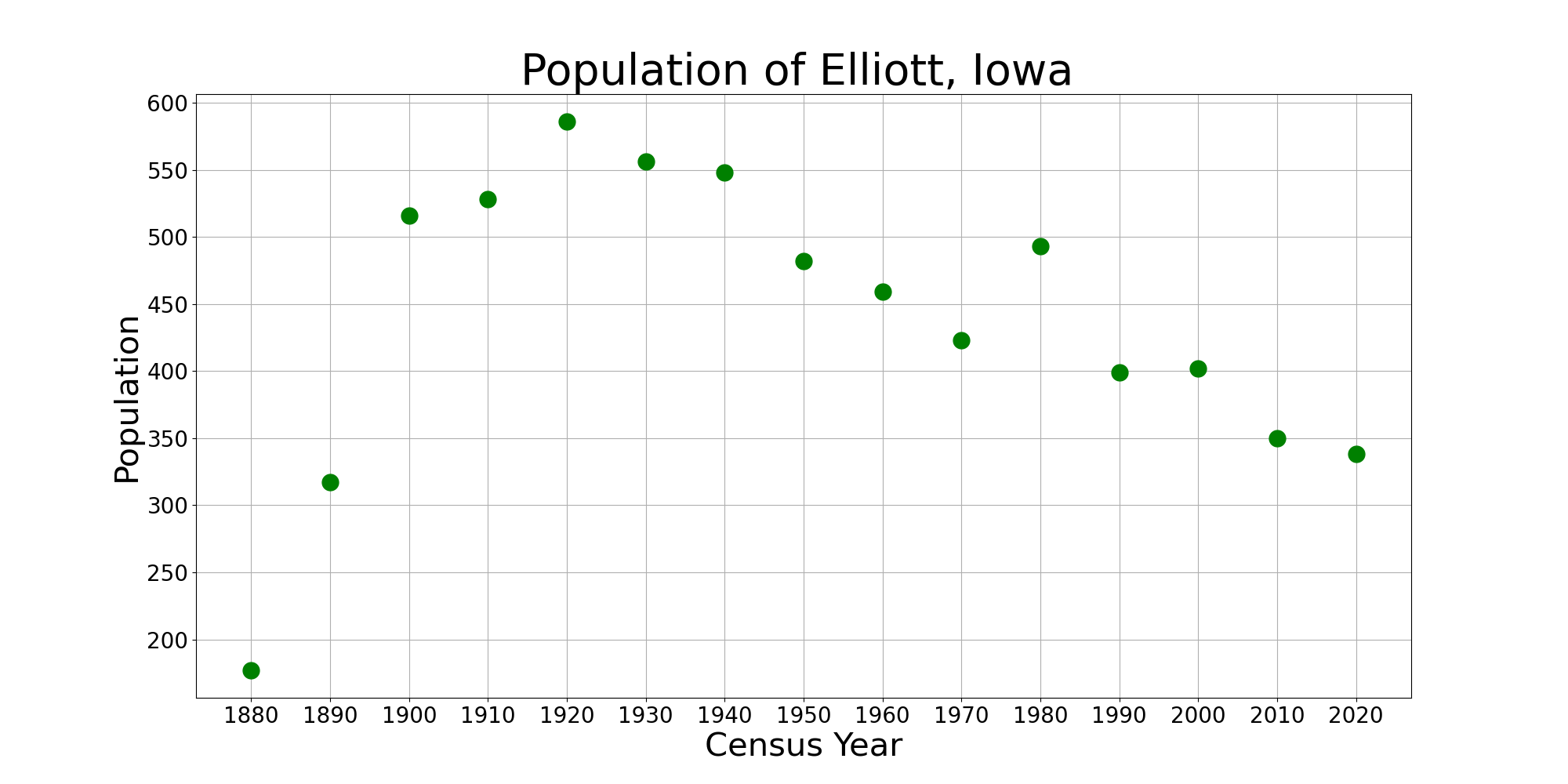
The population of Elliott, Iowa from US census data

=== 2020 census ===
As of the census of 2020, there were 338 people, 147 households, and 99 families residing in the city. The population density was 797.9 inhabitants per square mile (308.1/km^{2}). There were 160 housing units at an average density of 377.7 per square mile (145.8/km^{2}). The racial makeup of the city was 96.4% White, 0.0% Black or African American, 0.3% Native American, 0.3% Asian, 0.0% Pacific Islander, 0.0% from other races and 3.0% from two or more races. Hispanic or Latino persons of any race comprised 0.9% of the population.

Of the 147 households, 38.8% of which had children under the age of 18 living with them, 46.9% were married couples living together, 11.6% were cohabitating couples, 17.7% had a female householder with no spouse or partner present and 23.8% had a male householder with no spouse or partner present. 32.7% of all households were non-families. 25.2% of all households were made up of individuals, 8.8% had someone living alone who was 65 years old or older.

The median age in the city was 39.6 years. 26.3% of the residents were under the age of 20; 5.0% were between the ages of 20 and 24; 24.6% were from 25 and 44; 27.5% were from 45 and 64; and 16.6% were 65 years of age or older. The gender makeup of the city was 49.7% male and 50.3% female.

=== 2010 census ===
As of the census of 2010, there were 350 people, 147 households, and 95 families living in the city. The population density was 833.3 inhabitants per square mile (321.7/km^{2}). There were 168 housing units at an average density of 400.0 per square mile (154.4/km^{2}). The racial makeup of the city was 99.1% White, 0.3% Native American, 0.3% Asian, and 0.3% from two or more races. Hispanic or Latino of any race were 0.9% of the population.

There were 147 households, of which 31.3% had children under the age of 18 living with them, 51.7% were married couples living together, 9.5% had a female householder with no husband present, 3.4% had a male householder with no wife present, and 35.4% were non-families. 32.0% of all households were made up of individuals, and 12.2% had someone living alone who was 65 years of age or older. The average household size was 2.38 and the average family size was 2.98.

The median age in the city was 39.6 years. 26.9% of residents were under the age of 18; 5.2% were between the ages of 18 and 24; 26.6% were from 25 to 44; 28.2% were from 45 to 64; and 13.1% were 65 years of age or older. The gender makeup of the city was 48.9% male and 51.1% female.

=== 2000 census ===
As of the census of 2000, there were 402 people, 163 households, and 117 families living in the city. The population density was 981.1 inhabitants per square mile (378.8/km^{2}). There were 179 housing units at an average density of 436.9 per square mile (168.7/km^{2}). The racial makeup of the city was 99.25% White, 0.25% Asian, and 0.50% from two or more races.

There were 163 households, out of which 35.0% had children under the age of 18 living with them, 56.4% were married couples living together, 9.2% had a female householder with no husband present, and 28.2% were non-families. 25.8% of all households were made up of individuals, and 17.8% had someone living alone who was 65 years of age or older. The average household size was 2.47 and the average family size was 2.94.

In the city, the population was spread out, with 27.1% under the age of 18, 7.7% from 18 to 24, 28.9% from 25 to 44, 17.9% from 45 to 64, and 18.4% who were 65 years of age or older. The median age was 37 years. For every 100 females, there were 96.1 males. For every 100 females age 18 and over, there were 102.1 males.

The median income for a household in the city was $31,528, and the median income for a family was $35,114. Males had a median income of $28,750 versus $20,441 for females. The per capita income for the city was $15,018. About 11.6% of families and 14.9% of the population were below the poverty line, including 24.7% of those under age 18 and 9.9% of those age 65 or over.

== Education ==
The Griswold Community School District operates area public schools.

== Notable people ==
- Elvin Bishop, inducted into the Rock and Roll Hall of Fame in 2015, a founding member of the historic Paul Butterfield Blues Band
- Janet Thompson, basketball player
