= Red Oak, Iowa =

- City
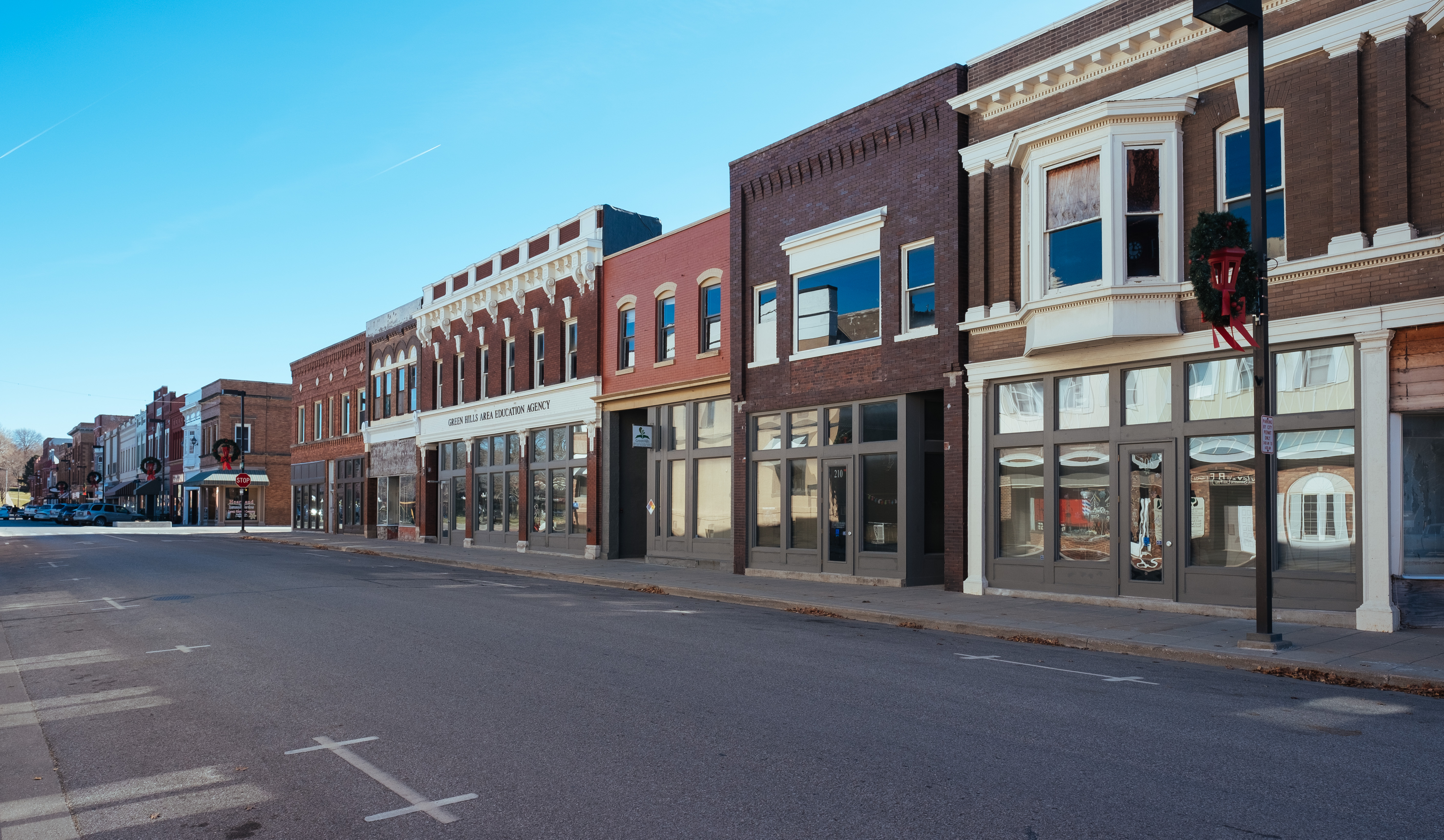
- Buildings in Downtown Red Oak

- Flag
- Motto: "A Shade Better"
- Location of Red Oak, Iowa
- Coordinates: 41°0′51″N 95°13′30″W
- Country: United States
- State: Iowa
- County: Montgomery
- Township: Red Oak
- Incorporated: June 28, 1869

Area
  - Total: 3.98 sq mi (10.31 km^{2})
  - Land: 3.93 sq mi (10.17 km^{2})
  - Water: 0.058 sq mi (0.15 km^{2})
- Elevation: 1,056 ft (322 m)

Population (2020)
  - Total: 5,596
  - Density: 1,425.5/sq mi (550.37/km^{2})
- Time zone: UTC-6 (Central (CST))
  - Summer (DST): UTC-5 (CDT)
- ZIP codes: 51566, 51591
- Area code: 712
- FIPS code: 19-66135
- GNIS feature ID: 2396337
- Website: www.city.redoakiowa.com

Red Oak is a city in and the county seat of Montgomery County, Iowa, United States, located along the East Nishnabotna River. The population was 5,596 in the 2020 census, a decline from the 6,197 population in 2000.

== History ==
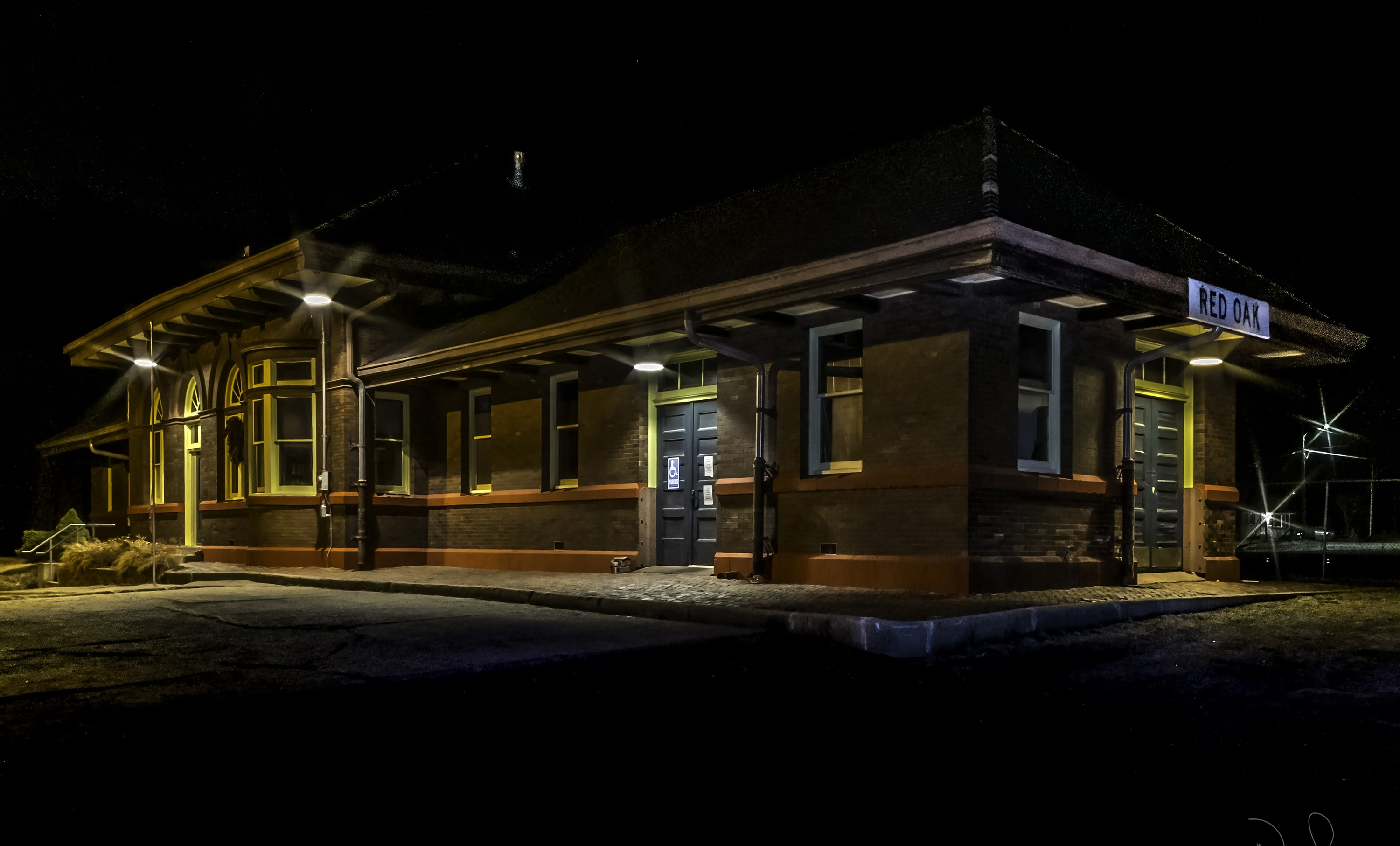
Restored BN Depot and World War II Museum at night

Red Oak derives its name from Red Oak Creek which flows through the community and was noted for the red oaks on its banks. The first settlers arrived there in the 1850s. In 1865 it became the official county seat of Montgomery County and the courthouse which had been in the middle of the county seven miles northeast in Frankfort, Iowa was towed to the community during a snow storm. That courthouse remained in place until the current Montgomery County Courthouse was built in 1891. It is on the National Register of Historic Places.

In 1869 the community was officially founded when the Chicago, Burlington and Quincy Railroad (called the Burlington and Missouri River Railroad at the time) arrived. The community was named Red Oak Junction by the railroad on March 20, 1876. The junction was a line off the main Chicago to Council Bluffs, Iowa line that went to Nebraska City, Nebraska and on to Lincoln, Nebraska. The Junction name was dropped in 1901 although the community continues to celebrate its history each summer in Junction Days. In 1903 a depot was opened by the railroad. Preservation efforts for the depot have been enacted since 1993. Today it is the Restored Burlington Northern Depot and World War II Museum celebrating the community's disproportionate casualties during World War II and other wars, significant military heritage and community pride in service to country. The depot is one of eighteen places in Montgomery County on the National Register of Historic Places listings in Montgomery County, Iowa.

Darwin R. Merritt, born in Red Oak on April 12, 1872, graduated third in his class from the United States Naval Academy in Annapolis, Maryland on July 1, 1897. On February 15, 1898, he perished in the explosion that sank the USS Maine (ACR-1) in the harbor of Havana, Cuba. His body was later recovered and interred in Evergreen Cemetery in Red Oak.

The community suffered, in a national per capita comparison, a disproportionate number of casualties in the Civil War and World War II.

In the American Civil War, the area provided more Union troops per capita than any other in the state. Company M (which also included residents from Montgomery County) had 160 casualties among its 250 members; 52 men were killed in action.

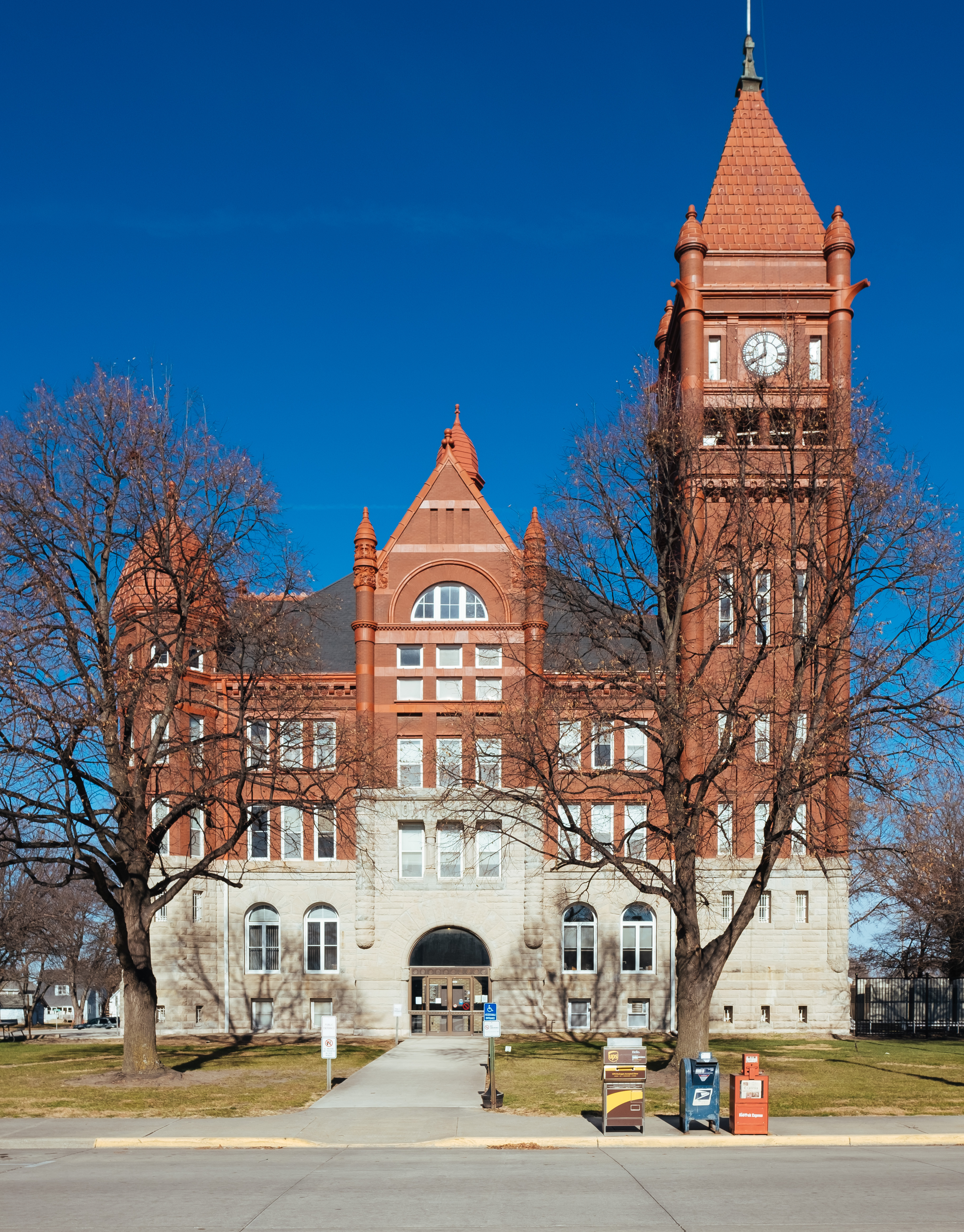
Montgomery County Court House

Early World War II battles claimed a disproportionate number of soldiers from Red Oak, although the final casualty statistics tend to disprove the oft-repeated statement that Red Oak suffered more losses per capita than any other American community. In the Battle of Kasserine Pass in February 1943, forty-five soldiers from Red Oak alone were captured or killed; more than 100 telegrams arrived in Red Oak saying that its soldiers were missing in action. In recognition of Red Oak's casualties, the city's name was given to a "victory ship". The SS Red Oak Victory has become a floating museum in the shipyard where it was built, in Richmond, California.

The old Burlington Northern depot has been transformed into the Restored BN Depot and World War II Museum telling this history.

The Red Oak School District was established in 1870, while Webster Eaton first published the Red Oak Express newspaper in 1868.

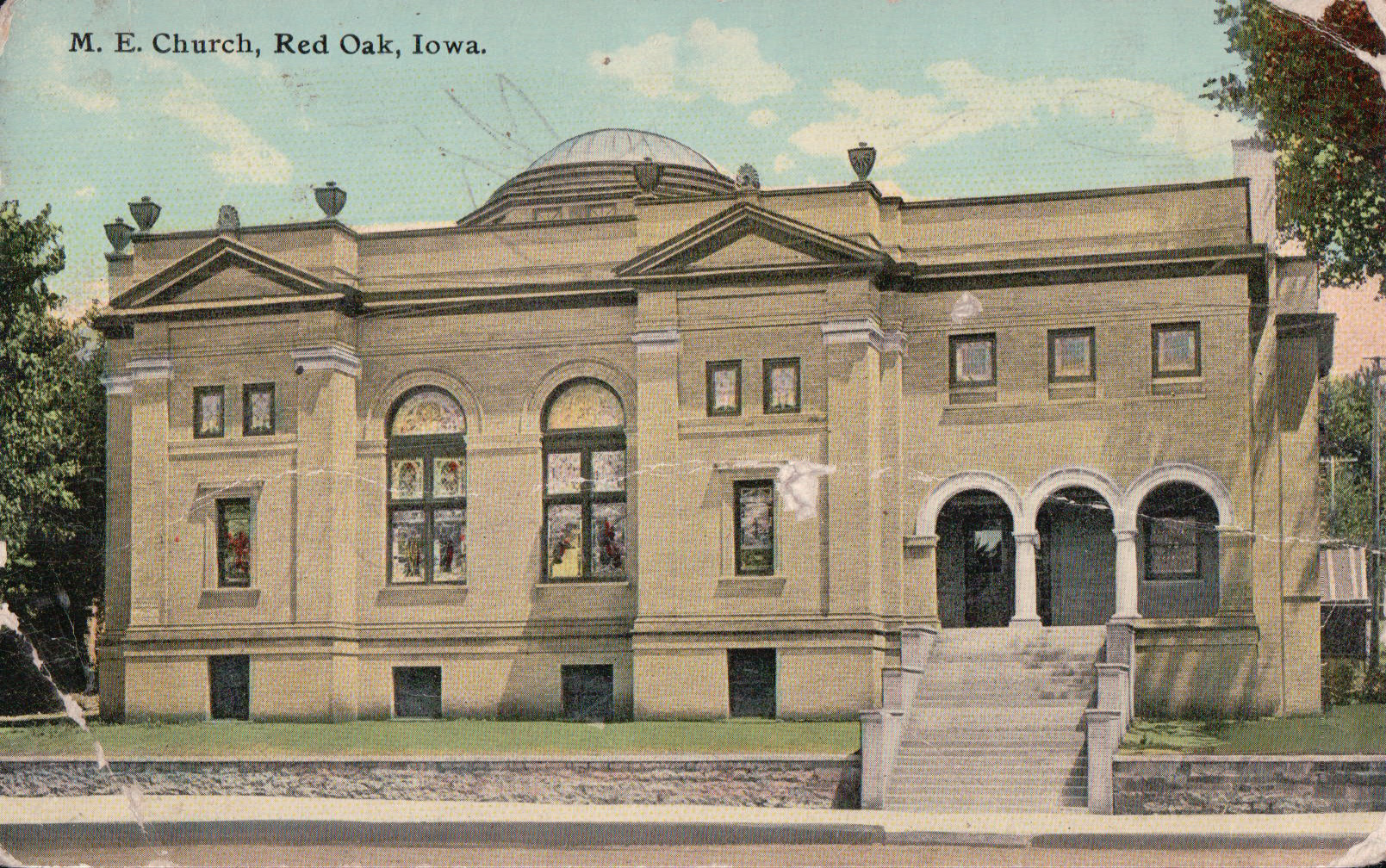
First Methodist Church, Red Oak, Iowa 1920s

== Geography ==
Red Oak is located at 41°0′42″N 95°13′38″W (41.011681, -95.227227).

According to the United States Census Bureau, the city has a total area of 4.01 square miles (10.39 km^{2}), of which 3.95 square miles (10.23 km^{2}) is land and 0.06 square miles (0.16 km^{2}) is water.

=== Climate ===
Climate data for Red Oak, Iowa (1991–2020, extremes 1897–present)
Month	Jan	Feb	Mar	Apr	May	Jun	Jul	Aug	Sep	Oct	Nov	Dec	Year
Record high °F (°C)	69 (21)	78 (26)	91 (33)	94 (34)	101 (38)	104 (40)	109 (43)	106 (41)	103 (39)	94 (34)	82 (28)	73 (23)	109 (43)
Mean maximum °F (°C)	55.6 (13.1)	61.1 (16.2)	75.4 (24.1)	85.3 (29.6)	90.3 (32.4)	93.1 (33.9)	95.4 (35.2)	94.4 (34.7)	91.8 (33.2)	85.8 (29.9)	70.7 (21.5)	59.2 (15.1)	97.2 (36.2)
Mean daily maximum °F (°C)	32.8 (0.4)	37.8 (3.2)	50.9 (10.5)	63.2 (17.3)	73.4 (23.0)	82.8 (28.2)	86.3 (30.2)	84.7 (29.3)	78.4 (25.8)	65.7 (18.7)	50.3 (10.2)	37.4 (3.0)	62.0 (16.7)
Daily mean °F (°C)	22.7 (−5.2)	27.1 (−2.7)	39.3 (4.1)	50.7 (10.4)	62.1 (16.7)	72.1 (22.3)	75.9 (24.4)	73.7 (23.2)	65.8 (18.8)	53.2 (11.8)	39.1 (3.9)	27.6 (−2.4)	50.8 (10.4)
Mean daily minimum °F (°C)	12.5 (−10.8)	16.4 (−8.7)	27.7 (−2.4)	38.3 (3.5)	50.8 (10.4)	61.4 (16.3)	65.5 (18.6)	62.7 (17.1)	53.2 (11.8)	40.6 (4.8)	27.8 (−2.3)	17.9 (−7.8)	39.6 (4.2)
Mean minimum °F (°C)	−10.1 (−23.4)	−3.6 (−19.8)	7.8 (−13.4)	22.6 (−5.2)	35.9 (2.2)	47.8 (8.8)	54.2 (12.3)	52.0 (11.1)	37.4 (3.0)	24.9 (−3.9)	12.2 (−11.0)	−3.0 (−19.4)	−14.0 (−25.6)
Record low °F (°C)	−27 (−33)	−28 (−33)	−22 (−30)	2 (−17)	26 (−3)	34 (1)	39 (4)	34 (1)	23 (−5)	13 (−11)	−14 (−26)	−26 (−32)	−28 (−33)
Average precipitation inches (mm)	0.88 (22)	1.11 (28)	2.03 (52)	3.83 (97)	5.95 (151)	5.44 (138)	3.96 (101)	3.89 (99)	3.58 (91)	3.31 (84)	1.88 (48)	1.38 (35)	37.24 (946)
Average snowfall inches (cm)	7.3 (19)	8.1 (21)	2.6 (6.6)	1.2 (3.0)	0.0 (0.0)	0.0 (0.0)	0.0 (0.0)	0.0 (0.0)	0.0 (0.0)	0.5 (1.3)	1.2 (3.0)	6.5 (17)	27.4 (70)
Average precipitation days (≥ 0.01 in)	5.4	6.6	8.0	10.9	13.5	11.0	9.5	8.9	8.0	8.0	6.3	6.3	102.4
Average snowy days (≥ 0.1 in)	3.7	4.2	1.4	0.5	0.0	0.0	0.0	0.0	0.0	0.3	1.1	3.7	14.9
Source: NOAA

== Demographics ==
Historical population
Census	Pop.	Note	%±
1870	1,315		—
1880	3,755		185.6%
1890	3,321		−11.6%
1900	4,355		31.1%
1910	4,830		10.9%
1920	5,578		15.5%
1930	5,778		3.6%
1940	5,763		−0.3%
1950	6,526		13.2%
1960	6,421		−1.6%
1970	6,210		−3.3%
1980	6,810		9.7%
1990	6,264		−8.0%
2000	6,197		−1.1%
2010	5,742		−7.3%
2020	5,596		−2.5%
U.S. Decennial Census

=== 2020 census ===
As of the 2020 census, Red Oak had a population of 5,596 people, with 2,454 households and 1,407 families. The population density was 1,425.5 inhabitants per square mile (550.4/km^{2}), and the housing unit density was 712.0 per square mile (274.9/km^{2}).

The median age was 42.6 years. 23.4% of residents were under the age of 18, and 22.2% were 65 years of age or older. 25.8% of residents were under the age of 20; 5.1% were between the ages of 20 and 24; 21.6% were from 25 to 44; and 25.3% were from 45 to 64. For every 100 females, there were 93.7 males, and for every 100 females age 18 and over there were 89.8 males age 18 and over. The gender makeup of the city was 48.4% male and 51.6% female.

98.4% of residents lived in urban areas, while 1.6% lived in rural areas.

There were 2,454 households, of which 25.6% had children under the age of 18 living in them. Of all households, 39.6% were married-couple households, 8.6% were cohabiting-couple households, 20.3% were households with a male householder and no spouse or partner present, and 31.5% were households with a female householder and no spouse or partner present. 42.7% of households were non-families. About 36.9% of all households were made up of individuals, and 18.1% had someone living alone who was 65 years of age or older.

There were 2,795 housing units, of which 12.2% were vacant. The homeowner vacancy rate was 3.7%, and the rental vacancy rate was 8.8%.

Racial composition as of the 2020 census
Race	Number	Percent
White	5,129	91.7%
Black or African American	19	0.3%
American Indian and Alaska Native	26	0.5%
Asian	22	0.4%
Native Hawaiian and Other Pacific Islander	2	0.0%
Some other race	151	2.7%
Two or more races	247	4.4%
Hispanic or Latino (of any race)	308	5.5%

=== 2010 census ===
At the 2010 census there were 5,742 people in 2,481 households, including 1,475 families, in the city. The population density was 1,453.7 inhabitants per square mile (561.3/km^{2}). There were 2,887 housing units at an average density of 730.9 per square mile (282.2/km^{2}). The racial makeup of the city was 96.3% White, 0.3% African American, 0.4% Native American, 0.2% Asian, 1.4% from other races, and 1.3% from two or more races. Hispanic or Latino of any race were 4.2%.

Of the 2,481 households 28.7% had children under the age of 18 living with them, 42.7% were married couples living together, 11.8% had a female householder with no husband present, 5.0% had a male householder with no wife present, and 40.5% were non-families. 34.9% of households were one person and 16.8% were one person aged 65 or older. The average household size was 2.26 and the average family size was 2.90.

The median age was 42.2 years. 24.4% of residents were under the age of 18; 6.6% were between the ages of 18 and 24; 22.2% were from 25 to 44; 26.6% were from 45 to 64; and 20.1% were 65 or older. The gender makeup of the city was 47.6% male and 52.4% female.

=== 2000 census ===
At the 2000 census there were 6,197 people in 2,670 households, including 1,650 families, in the city. The population density was 1,684.7 inhabitants per square mile (650.5/km^{2}). There were 2,985 housing units at an average density of 811.5 per square mile (313.3/km^{2}). The racial makeup of the city was 97.42% Caucasian, ??? African American, 0.11% Asian, 0.50% Native American, 0.37% Asian, 0.02% Pacific Islander, 1.11% from other races, and 0.47% from two or more races. Hispanic or Latino of any race were 2.15%.

Of the 2,670 households 28.7% had children under the age of 18 living with them, 47.6% were married couples living together, 10.7% had a female householder with no husband present, and 38.2% were non-families. 33.8% of households were one person and 16.8% were one person aged 65 or older. The average household size was 2.27 and the average family size was 2.89.

Age spread: 24.6% under the age of 18, 7.0% from 18 to 24, 25.7% from 25 to 44, 21.9% from 45 to 64, and 20.8% 65 or older. The median age was 40 years. For every 100 females, there were 83.0 males. For every 100 females age 18 and over, there were 79.9 males.

The median household income was $30,098 and the median family income was $37,007. Males had a median income of $28,942 versus $20,047 for females. The per capita income for the city was $15,793. About 7.9% of families and 10.3% of the population were below the poverty line, including 14.8% of those under age 18 and 6.2% of those age 65 or over.

== Hospital ==
The Montgomery County Memorial Hospital (MCMH) is located in Red Oak. MCMH is a modern 25-bed facility with birth to hospice capabilities. MCMH management puts an emphasis on health care for the local community inside the hospital and with programs outside of the hospital.

It began as Red Oak Hospital when Dr. B.F. Gillmor opened a 15-bed hospital in 1920. In 1931 it was renamed the Murphy Memorial Hospital in honor of a bequest of $40,000 from Thomas D. and Ina C. Murphy. In 1941 a 26-bed hospital was built in a new location, with an addition in 1951. In 1961 a long-term care unit, named Highland Acres, was constructed. In 1978 in a special election voters approved of Montgomery County taking ownership of Murphy Memorial Hospital. The facility then became known as Montgomery County Memorial Hospital. In 1989 a new hospital was built and in 1993 a Physicians Center was added.

== Education ==
The Red Oak Community School District operates local public schools.

== Points of interest ==
- Red Oak had a horse-drawn streetcar system from 1882 to 1901: the Red Oak Street Railway.
- It has a transmitter for the Iowa Public television system.

== Notable people ==
- Dennis Ashbaugh, painter
- James R. Bennett, Secretary of State of Alabama 1993–2003, 2013–2015
- Lou Blonger (1849–1924), Wild West saloonkeeper
- Clyde Cessna (1879–1954), founder of Cessna Aircraft Company
- Horace E. Deemer (1858–1917), Chief Justice of Iowa Supreme Court
- Thomas Harlan Ellett (1880–1951), New York City architect
- Joni Ernst (born 1970), U.S. senator for Iowa
- Ida M. Evans, short story writer
- Kenneth A. Evans (1898–1970), Republican member of Iowa Senate 1937-45 and Lieutenant Governor of Iowa from 1945 to 1951
- Kurt Griffey (1968), guitarist for Creedence Clearwater Revisited.
- Raymond Hatton (1887–1971), actor
- Elvin Hutchison (1912–2001), running back for the Detroit Lions and National Football League official
- James E. Kearney (1884–1977), Roman Catholic bishop
- Dick Kenworthy, Major League Baseball third baseman for the Chicago White Sox
- John Milton Killits (1858–1938), United States federal judge in the United States District Court for the Northern District of Ohio from 1910 to 1928
- John Logan (poet) (1923–1987), poet and professor
- Smith McPherson (1848–1915), Iowa Attorney General from 1881 to 1885
- Judi Sheppard Missett (1944–), founder of Jazzercise
- L. Welch Pogue (1899–2003), aviation attorney and chairman of the now-defunct Civil Aeronautics Board.
- Stephen Shortridge, actor
- Con Starkel (1880–1933), Major League Baseball pitcher for the Washington Senators
- Duane Thompson (1903–1970), actress in silent films
- Nellie Walker (1874–1973), sculptor best known for statue of James Harlan in National Statuary Hall Collection in the United States Capitol
- Fred Lawrence Whipple (1906–2004), astronomer, creator of the Whipple shield and Professor of Astronomy at Harvard University from 1950 to 1977
